= Derrien =

Derrien may refer to:

== People ==
Notable people with this surname include:

- André Derrien (1895-1994), French sailor
- Marcelle Derrien (1916–2008), French actress
- Maxence Derrien (born 1993) is a French footballer
- Sandrine Derrien, French table tennis player

== Places ==
- La Roche-Derrien, Brittany, France
- Saint-Derrien, Brittany, France
