= Château de Kerjean =

Fortified château in Brittany, France

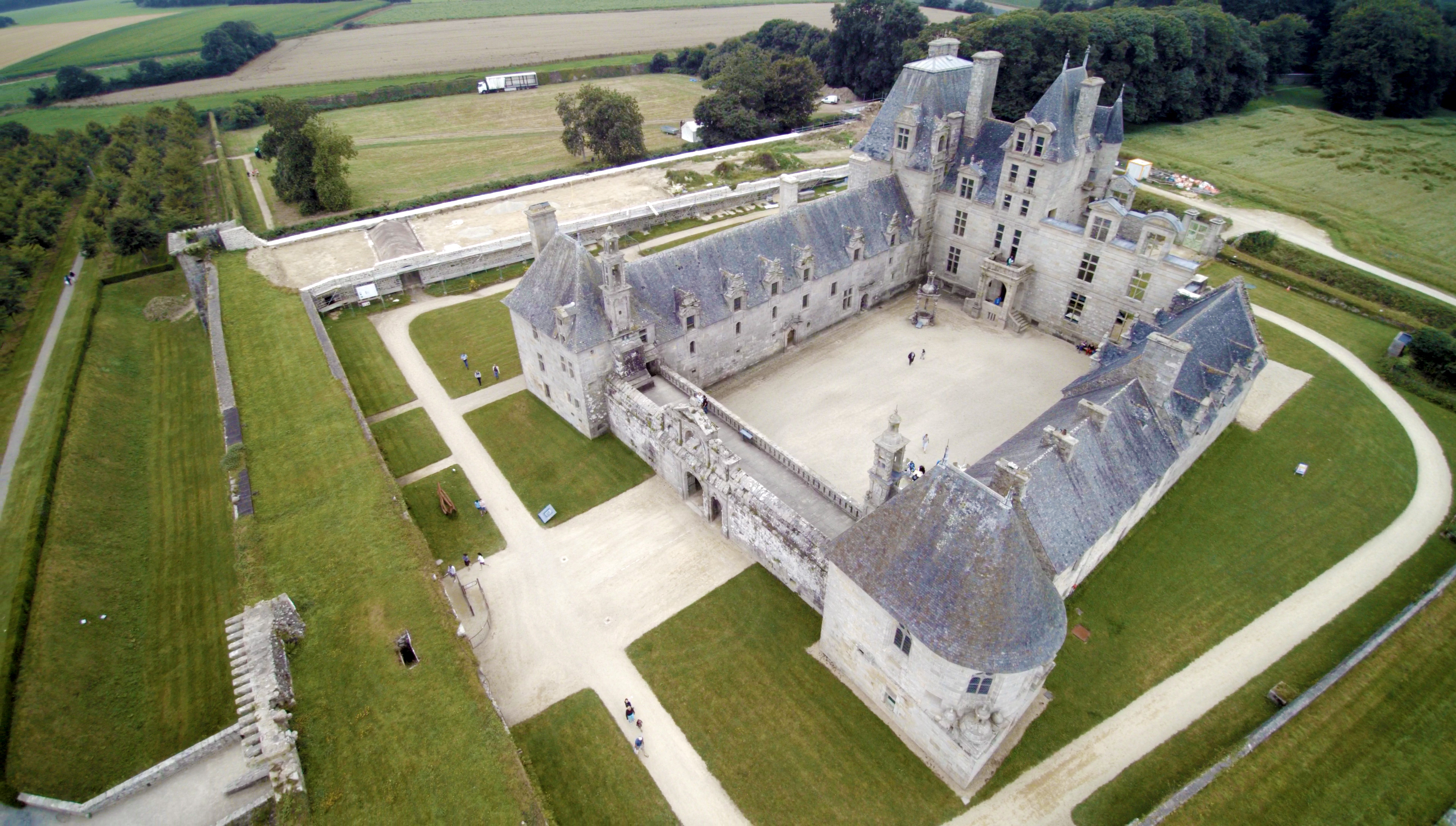
- Aerial view

- Location within France

General information
- Type: Fortified château (manor house)
- Architectural style: Renaissance style
- Location: Saint-Vougay, Brittany, France
- Coordinates: 48.5805°N 4.1472°W
- Construction started: 1540s
- Completed: 1590s

Technical details
- Grounds: 19–20 hectares

Design and construction
- Designations: Monument historique

Website
- Official website

Château de Kerjean is a 16th-century fortified chateau (manor house) located close to the town of Saint-Vougay, in the Finistère department of Brittany, France.

It was originally built for members of the Barbier family (later titled as Marquis de Kerjean) between the 1540s and 1590s. The chateau was damaged in the 1790s during the French Revolution, and fell into further disrepair during the 19th century.

The building was taken into state care in 1911 and restored in the late 20th and early 21st centuries. Standing in a 20-hectare park, the house, park and some out-lying structures (including a large dovecote) are open to the public.

== History ==
Finistère was a thriving agricultural area in the 16th century, and the Barbier family built a fortified house on their estate lands close to Saint-Vougay. The building followed contemporary fashions and included elements of Renaissance architecture of the house itself, with a slightly less common bastioned and casemated external defensive wall.

The manor house was the hub of an active agricultural estate for several centuries, before becoming somewhat neglected during the 17th century.

Following a marriage between the Barbier and Coatanscour families, the estate and house experienced some growth in the 18th century. However, during the French Revolution, the Marquise de Coatanscour was arrested, imprisoned and guillotined in Brest, and the estate and chateau forfeited to the republic.

Serving as a military garrison after the Revolution, during which time the building fell into significant disrepair, the house was sold to the Brilhac family in 1802. Several damaged sections of the house were further dismantled in this period – with lead and stone sold as building material – before the Forsanz-Coatgoureden family took control.

In 1911 the French state bought the chateau, classified the site as a historic monument, and from the 1980s to the early 2000s restored the house and surrounds.

== Gallery ==
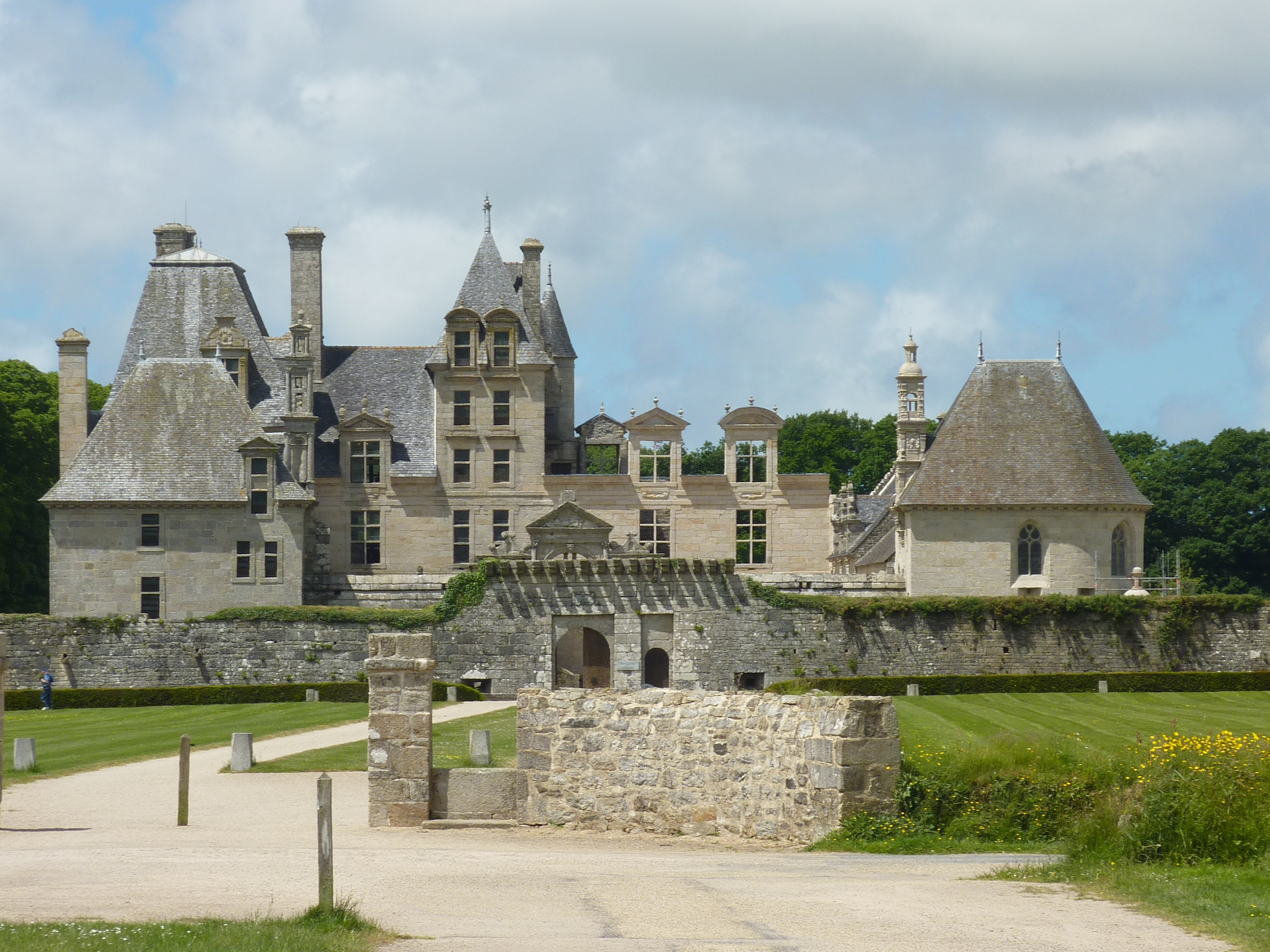
Frontage

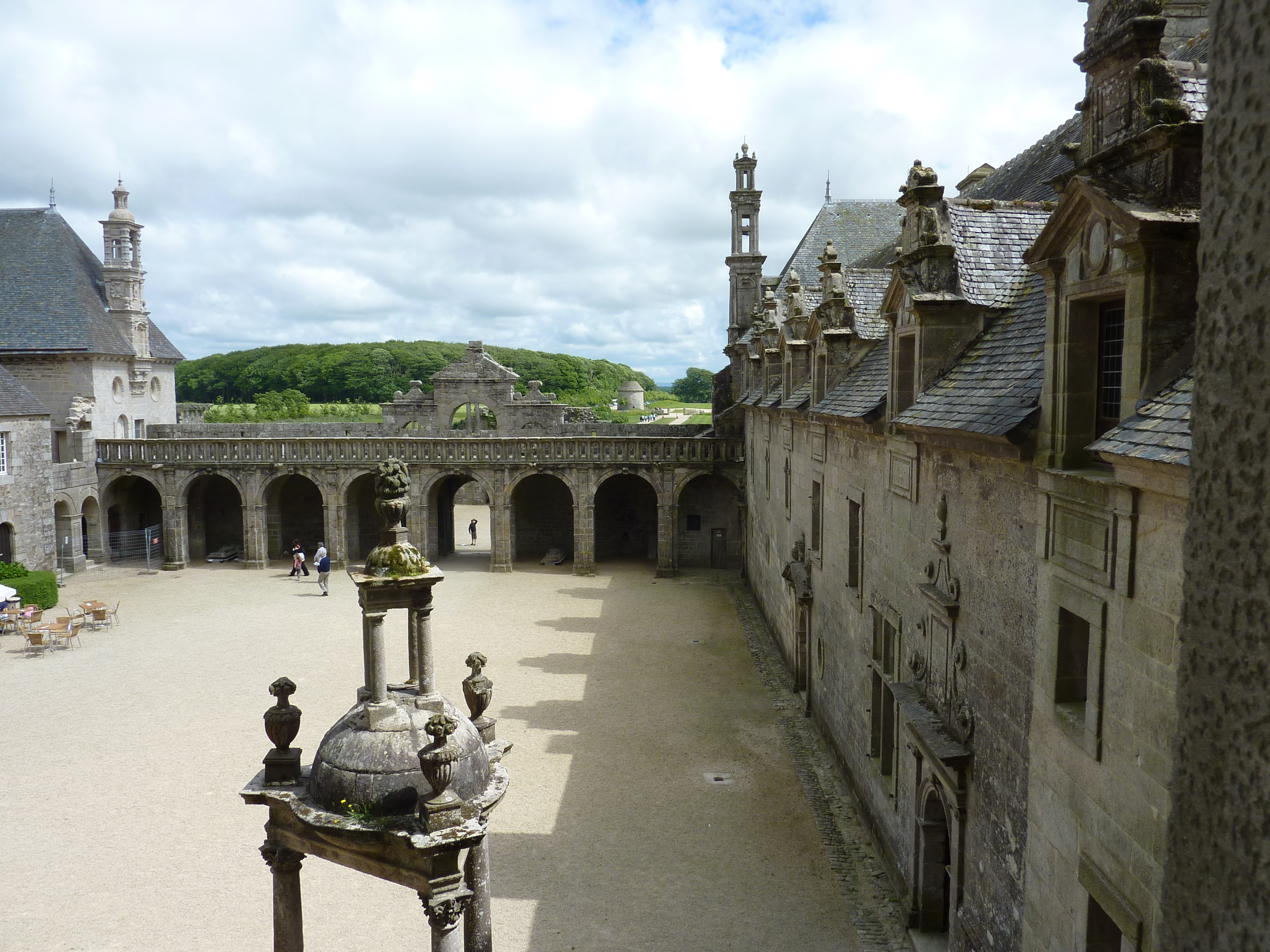
Courtyard, entrance and chapel

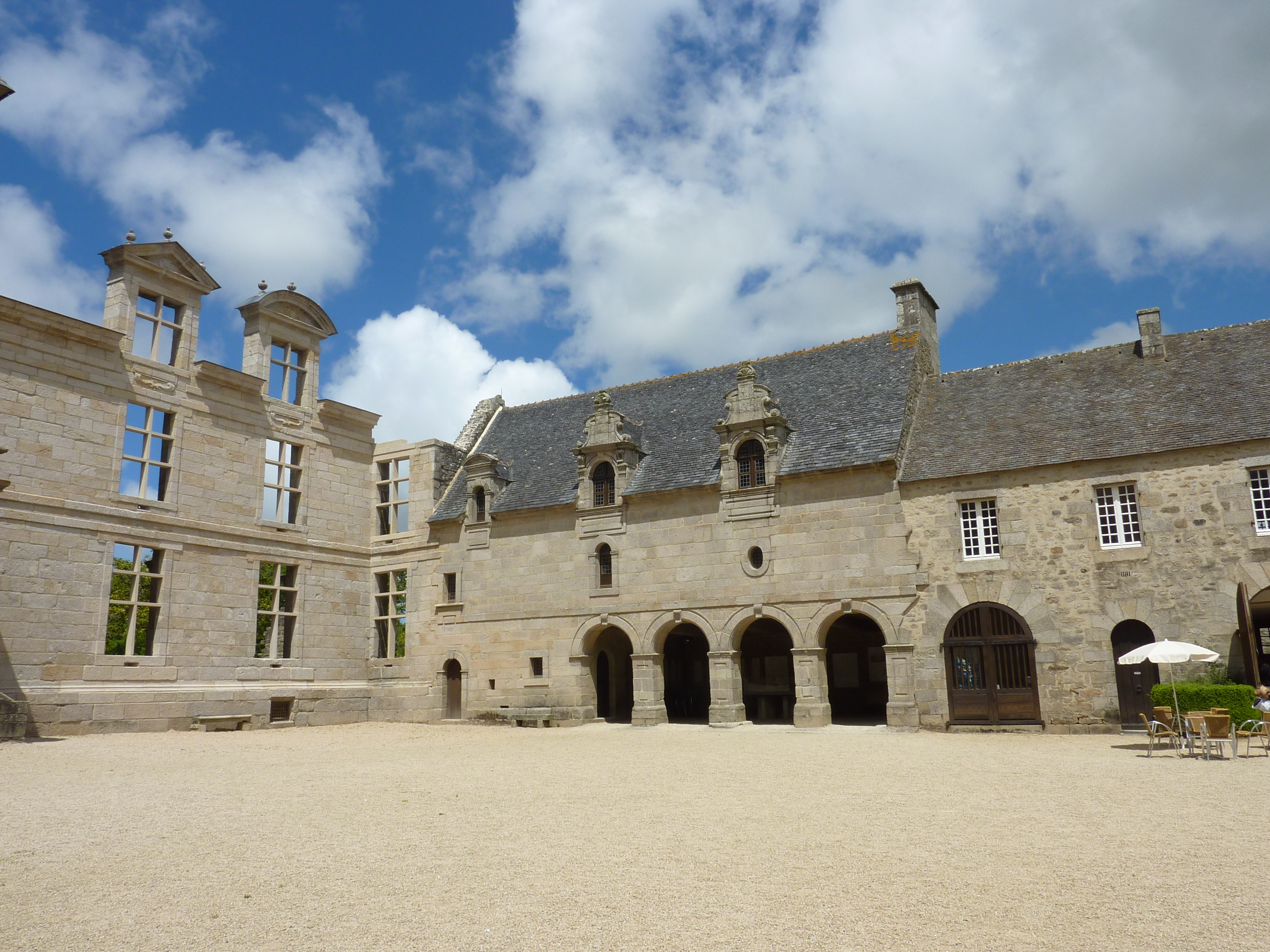
Courtyard looking north-east

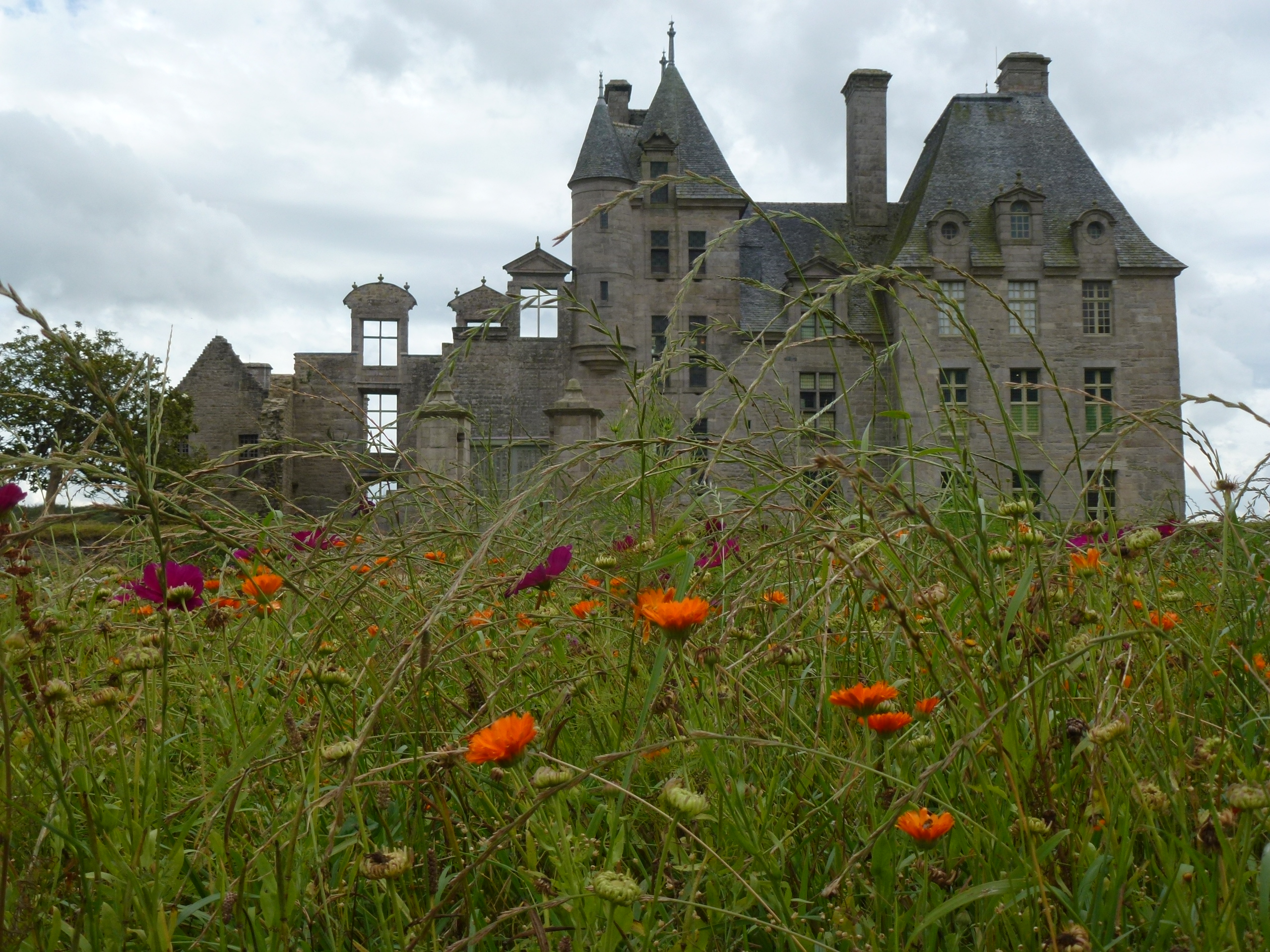
North face

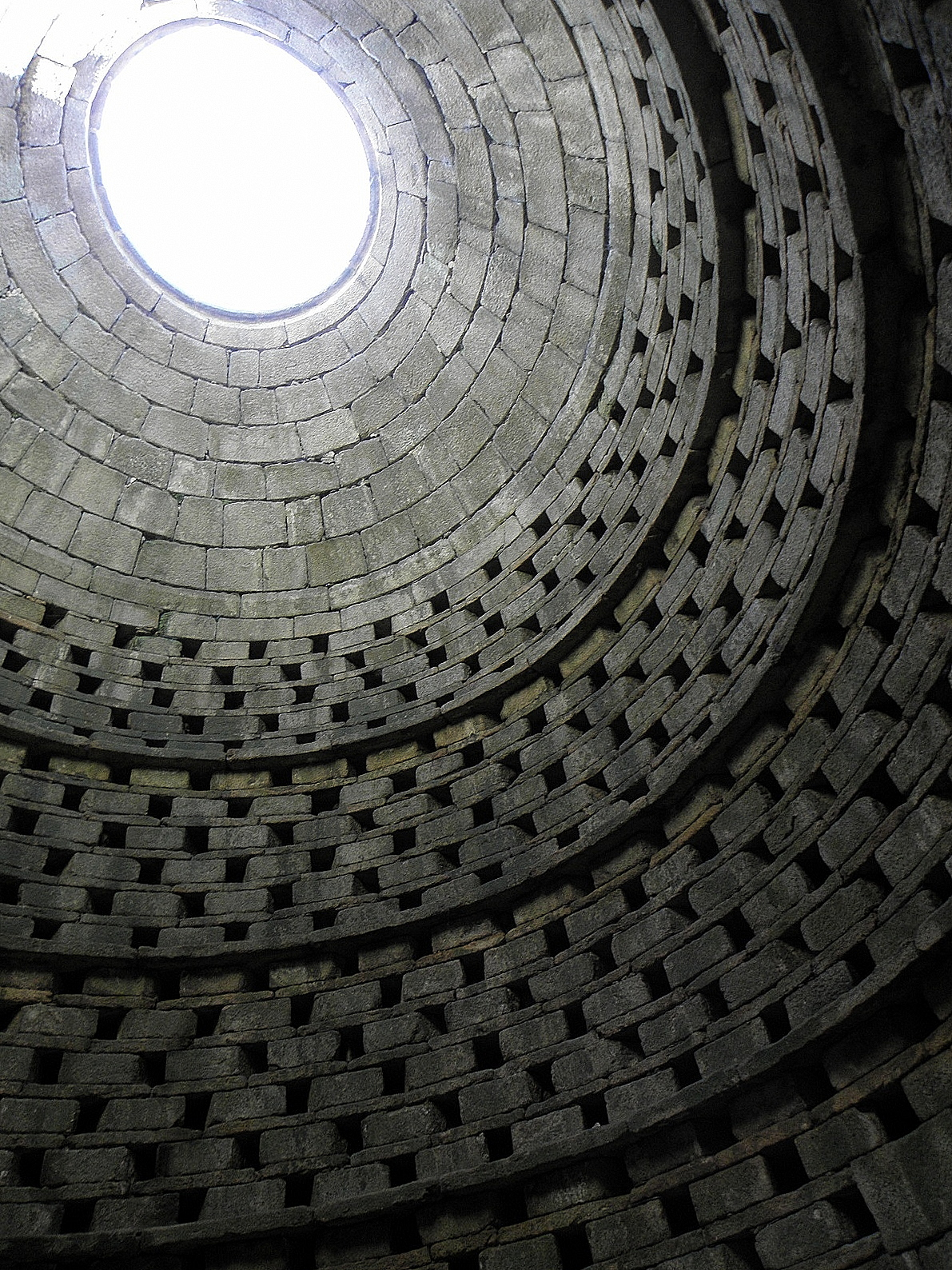
Dovecote

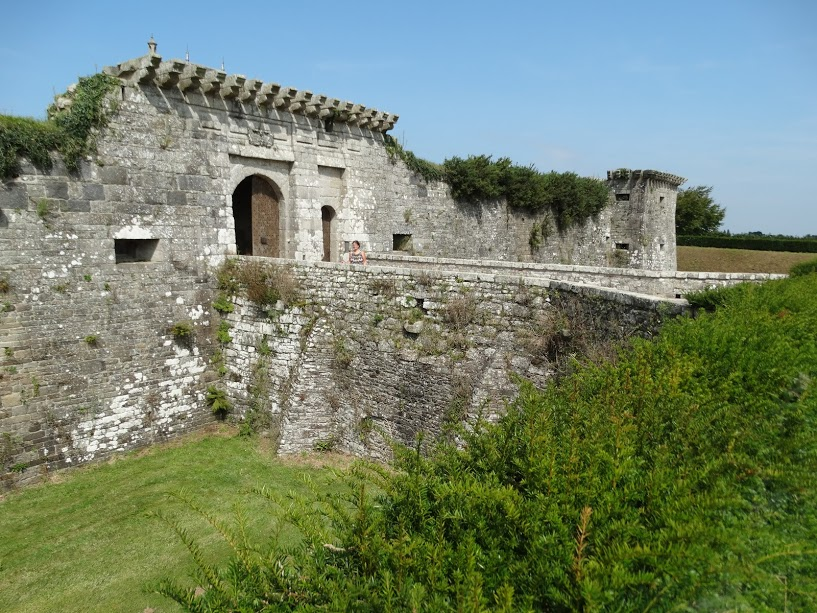
Ditch and external fortifications

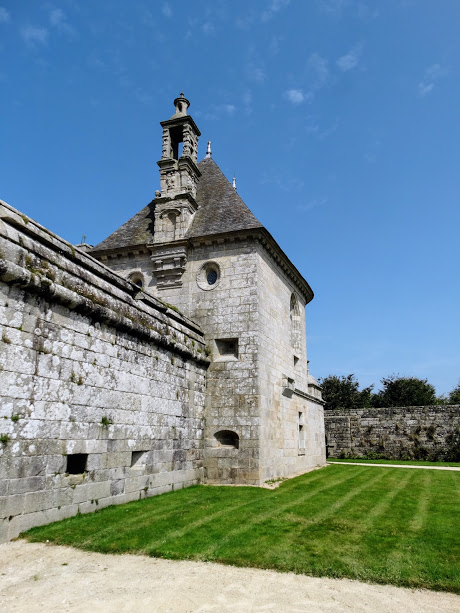
Corner tower

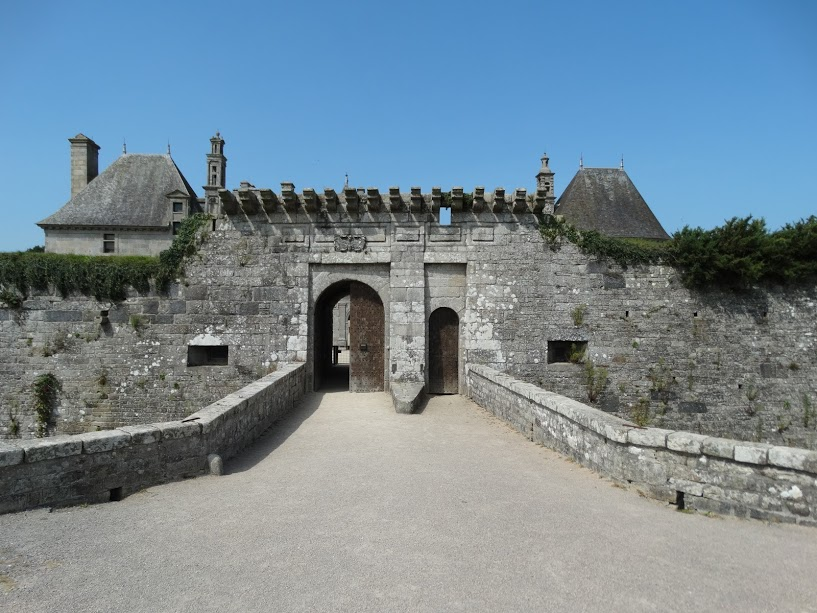
External gate

== See also ==
- List of castles in Brittany
