= List of castles in Brittany =

This list of castles in Brittany is a list of medieval castles or château forts in the region in western France.

Links in italics are links to articles in the French Wikipedia.

== Côtes-d'Armor ==
Castles of which little or nothing remains include Château de Montafilan.

Name	Date	Condition	Image	Ownership / Access	Notes
Château de Dinan	14th century	Substantially intact		Commune	Houses local museum.
Fort-la-Latte	14th century	Substantially intact			Surviving drawbridge.
Château du Guildo	12-14th century	Ruins			
Château de La Hunaudaye	13-15th century	Ruins			
Château de Guingamp	15th century				
Château de La Roche-Jagu	1418	Intact			
Château de Tonquédec	15th century	Ruins			

== Finistère ==
Castles of which little or nothing remains include Château de Joyeuse Garde and Château de Rustéphan.

Name	Date	Condition	Image	Ownership / Access	Notes
Château de Brest	11-17th century	Intact			On site of Roman fort, military fortress until 20th century.
Château de Châteaulin	10th century	Ruins			Destroyed by the English in 1373.
Château de Kerjean	1540s-1590s	Substantially intact			Damaged during the French Revolution, restored in the 20th and 21st century.
Château de Kérouzéré	15-17th century	Intact			Besieged in 1590 during the French Wars of Religion, rebuilt c.1600.
Château du Taureau	16-17th century.	Substantially intact			Built 1542, redesigned by Vauban 1689.
Château de Trémazan	13-14th century	Ruins			Partially collapsed 1995.

== Ille-et-Vilaine ==
Name	Date	Condition	Image	Ownership / Access	Notes
Château de Bonnefontaine	11-16th century	Rebuilt			
Château de Combourg	11-15th century	Intact		Private (open to the public)	Childhood home of François-René de Chateaubriand.
Château de Fougères	12-15th century	Substantially intact			
Château de Saint-Aubin-du-Cormier	13th century.	Ruins			
Château de Saint-Malo	15-18th century	Restored		Commune	
Solidor Tower	1369-82	Intact			Formerly used as a gaol, now a museum.
Château de Vitré	13-15th century	Restored		Commune	Abandoned 17th century, damaged by fire 18th century, restored from 1875.

== Morbihan ==
Name	Date	Condition	Image	Ownership / Access	Notes
Château de Comper		Rebuilt			Dismantled 1598, rebuilt 19th century.
Château de Josselin	14th century	Substantially intact			Partially demolished in 1629 on orders of Cardinal Richelieu, four of the original nine towers remain.
Château de Largoët	13-15th century	Ruins			
Château du Plessis-Josso	14-16th century	Intact			
Château de Pontivy	15-16th century	Intact			Also known as the Château des Rohan.
Château de Suscinio	13-15th century	Restored		Département	Restored from ruin after 1965, built as residence of the Duke of Brittany.
Château de Trécesson	15th century	Intact		Private	

== See also ==
- List of castles in France
- List of châteaux in France
