= Guiclan =

Guiclan Gwiglann
- Commune
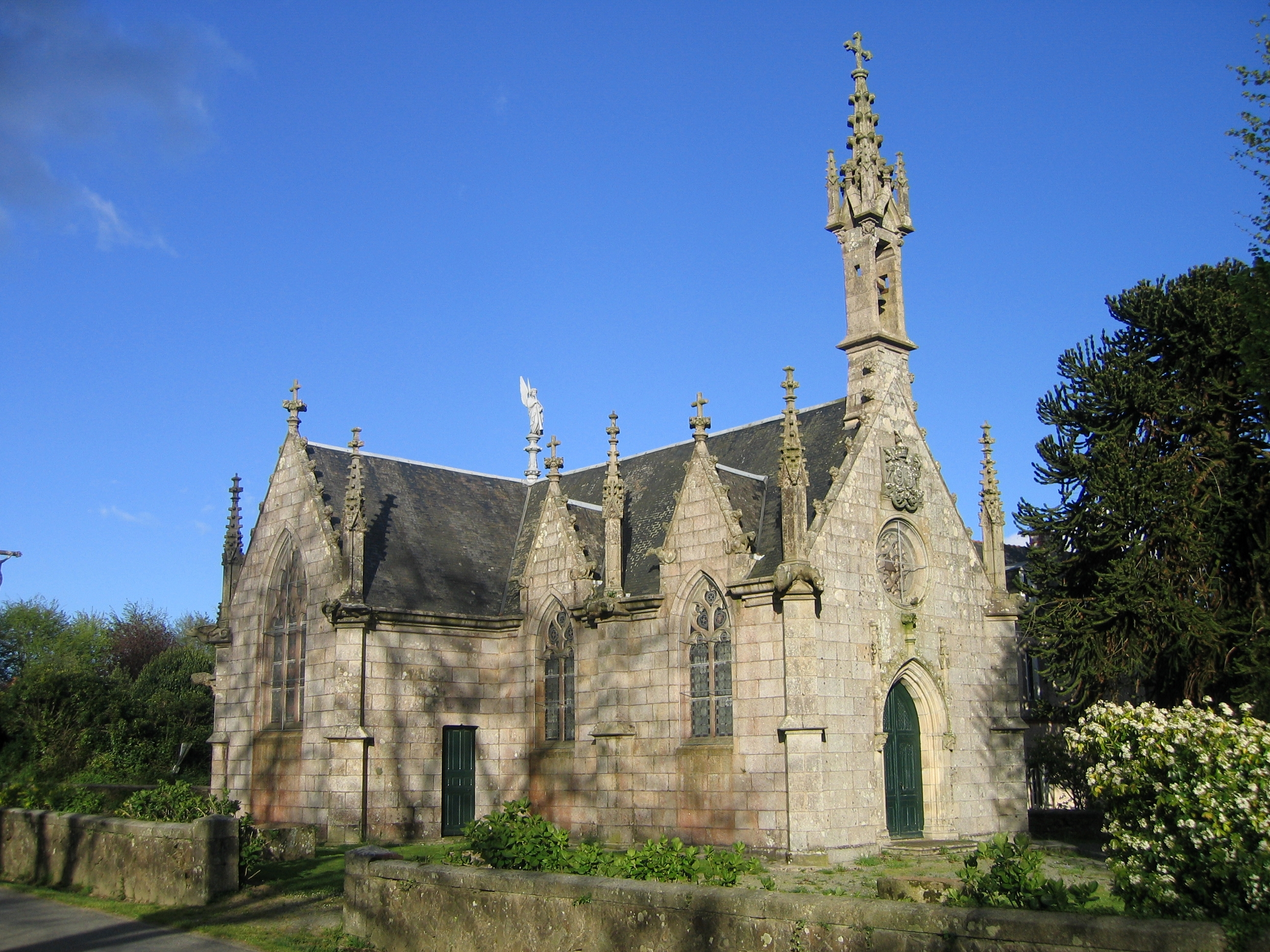
- The Chapel of Saint-Jacques, in Guiclan

- Coat of arms
- Location of Guiclan
- Location within France Location within Brittany
- Coordinates: 48°33′07″N 3°57′37″W
- Country: France
- Region: Brittany
- Department: Finistère
- Arrondissement: Morlaix
- Canton: Landivisiau
- Intercommunality: Pays de Landivisiau

Government
  - Mayor (2020–2026): Robert Bodiguel
- Area^{1}: 42.64 km^{2} (16.46 sq mi)
- Highest elevation: 131 m (430 ft)
- Lowest elevation: 3 m (9.8 ft)
- Population (2023): 2,585
  - Density: 60.62/km^{2} (157.0/sq mi)
- Time zone: UTC+01:00 (CET)
  - Summer (DST): UTC+02:00 (CEST)
- INSEE/Postal code: 29068 /29410
- ^{1} French Land Register data, which excludes lakes, ponds, glaciers > 1 km^{2} (0.386 sq mi or 247 acres) and river estuaries.

Guiclan (French pronunciation: [ɡiklɑ̃]; Breton: Gwiglann) is a commune in the Finistère department of Brittany in north-western France.

== Population ==
Inhabitants of Guiclan are called in French Guiclanais.

Historical population
Year	Pop.	±% p.a.
1968	2,076	—
1975	2,011	−0.45%
1982	1,937	−0.53%
1990	2,045	+0.68%
1999	2,030	−0.08%
2007	2,134	+0.63%
2012	2,364	+2.07%
2017	2,490	+1.04%
2023	2,585	+0.63%
Source: INSEE

== See also ==
- Communes of the Finistère department
