= Commana Parish close =

Coordinates: 48.4134°N 3.9556°W

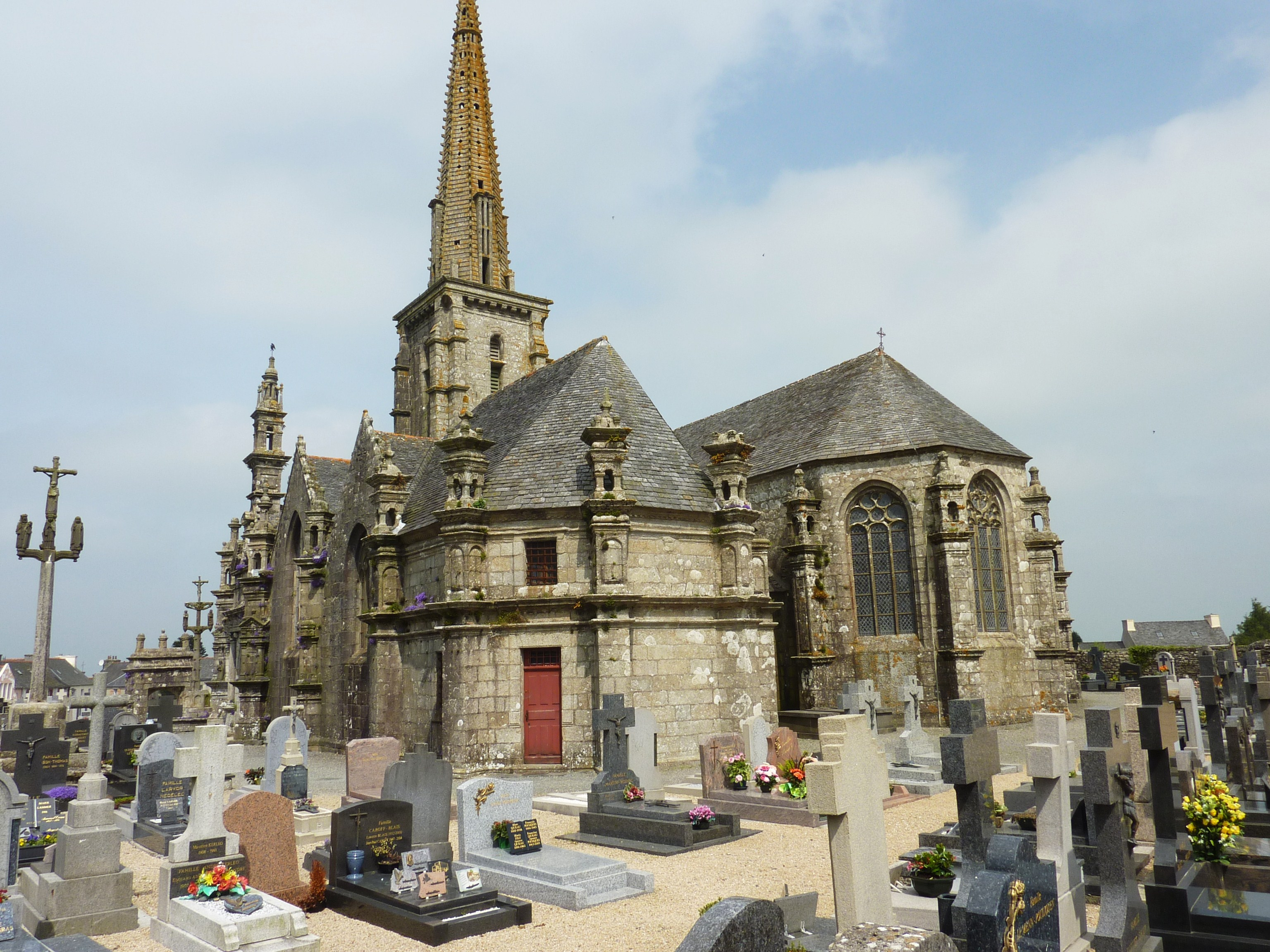

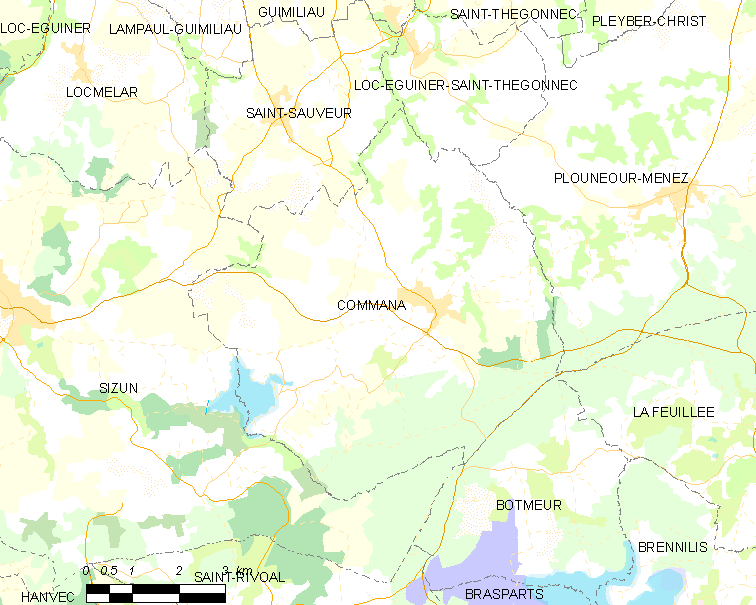
Map showing the location of Commana

The Commana Parish close (Enclos paroissial) is located at Commana in the arrondissement of Morlaix in Brittany in north-western France. The parish church of Commana is dedicated to the 14th century Breton saint, Saint Derrien. The church was built in 1645. The church, the ossuary, the calvary and the triumphal arch are a listed historical monument since 1915.

== Calvaries ==
There are two calvaries in Commana. One is dated 1624, is 6 metres high, and was the work of Roland Doré whilst the second carries two dates: 1585 and 1742. The Doré calvary is located in the enclos cemetery whilst the older calvary stands between the triumphal arch and the south porch. In the older calvary there is a statue of Mary Magdalene at the base of the cross and beneath the depiction of the crucified Jesus is a depiction of an angel and devil with Saint Sebastian with archers depicted on the reverse. On the Doré calvary, there is a depiction of a monk with a book on the reverse side to the crucified Jesus. The other statues are of the Virgin Mary with Saint Hervé on the reverse side and John the Evangelist with Saint Francis of Assisi on the reverse. There is also a sculpture of a "Vierge de Pitié".

== The ossuary ==
The building was built between 1677 and 1687 and has an altar which came from an old ruined chapel.

== The porch ==
The porch was built in the Renaissance style in around 1645. In the central niche, there is a statue of Saint Derrien. Inside the porch, there are twelve empty niches these leading up to two doors which give access to the church. The buttresses supporting the porch also have niches which contain sculptures depicting Joseph and the Virgin Mary.

== The bell-tower ==
The tower is 57 metres high and dates to 1592.

== Altarpieces ==
The Baroque Saint Anne altarpiece depicts Saint Anne, the Virgin Mary and Jesus holding a terrestrial globe with niches containing statues of Saint Joachim and Saint Joseph and a depiction of the Annunciation, with the Holy Father wearing a crown and presenting his resurrected son. The Rosary altarpiece depicts the Virgin Mary handing the rosary to Saint Dominic and Saint Catherine of Sienna and the altarpiece of the "Cinque Plaies" depicts the resurrected Jesus showing the wounds from the crucifixion whilst two angels crown him with a garland of flowers. One holds the crown of thorns and the other some nails. In niches are statues of Saints Marguerite and Sebastian. At Marguerite's feet is a rather terrifying dragon.

== The choir ==
Contains statues of both Saint Pol de Léon and Saint Derrien.

== The pulpit ==
The pulpit dates to 1673.

== The Baptistry ==
Dates from 1656 to 1683. The granite font dates to 1656 and the baldachin dates to 1683 and is the work of Honoré Alliot. The baldachin has five wood carvings depicting Charity, Hope, Faith, Justice and Temperance.

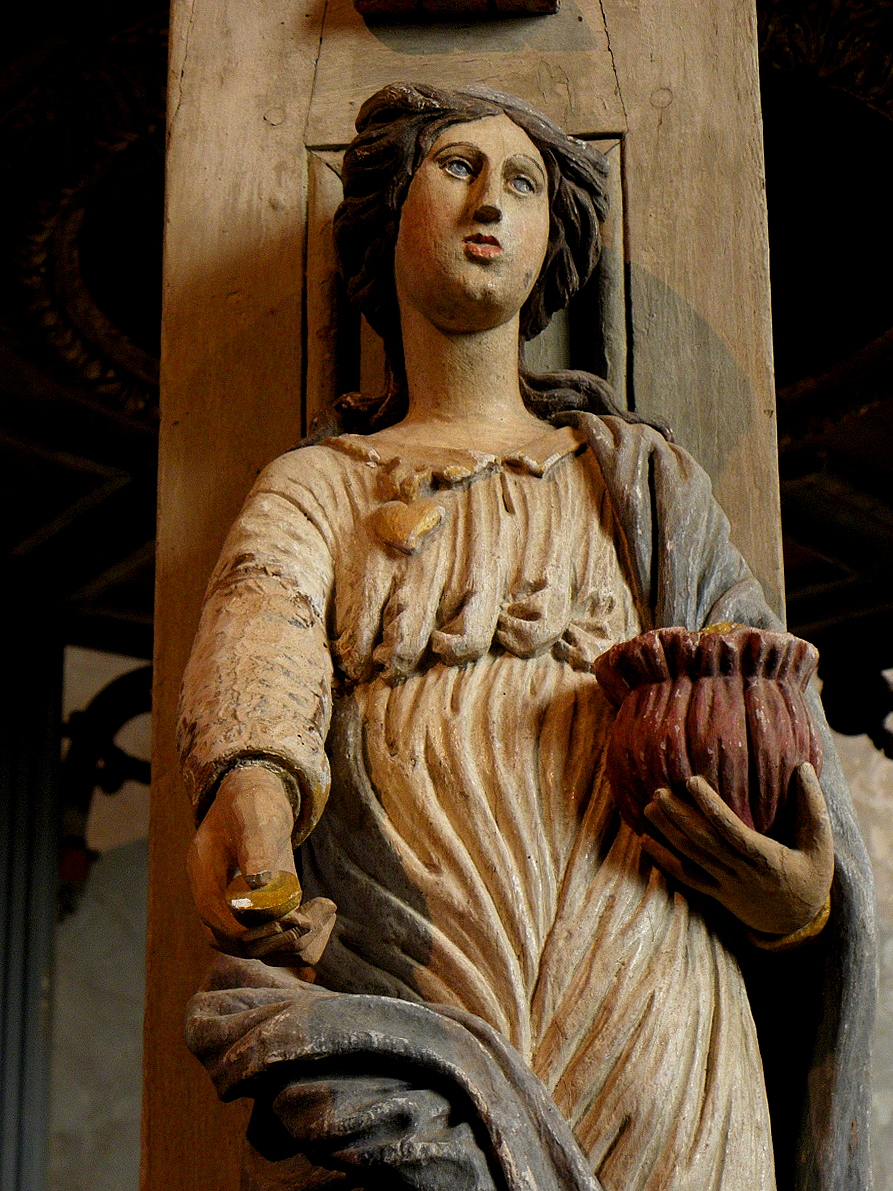
A wood carving, an allegory for "Charity", on one of the five pillars supporting the baldachin.

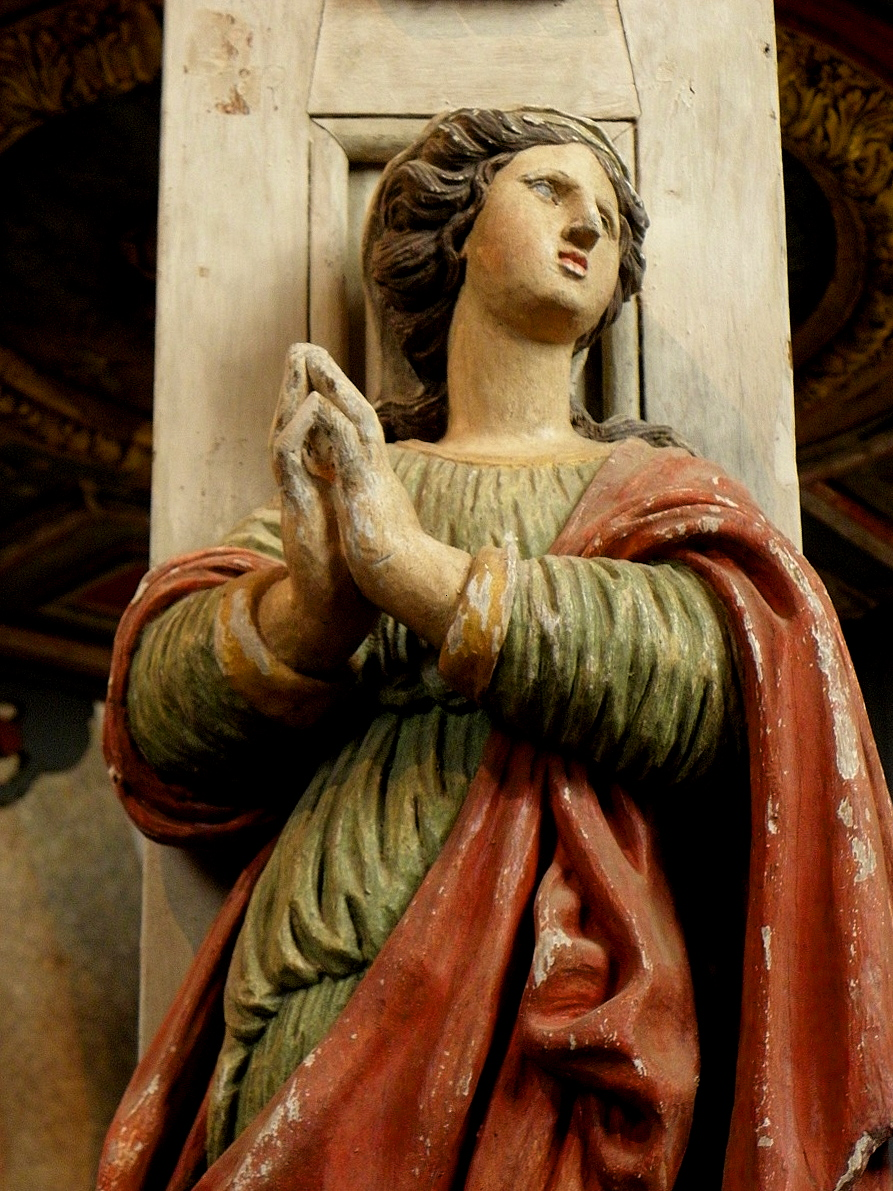
A wood carving, an allegory for "Hope", on one of the five pillars supporting the baldachin.

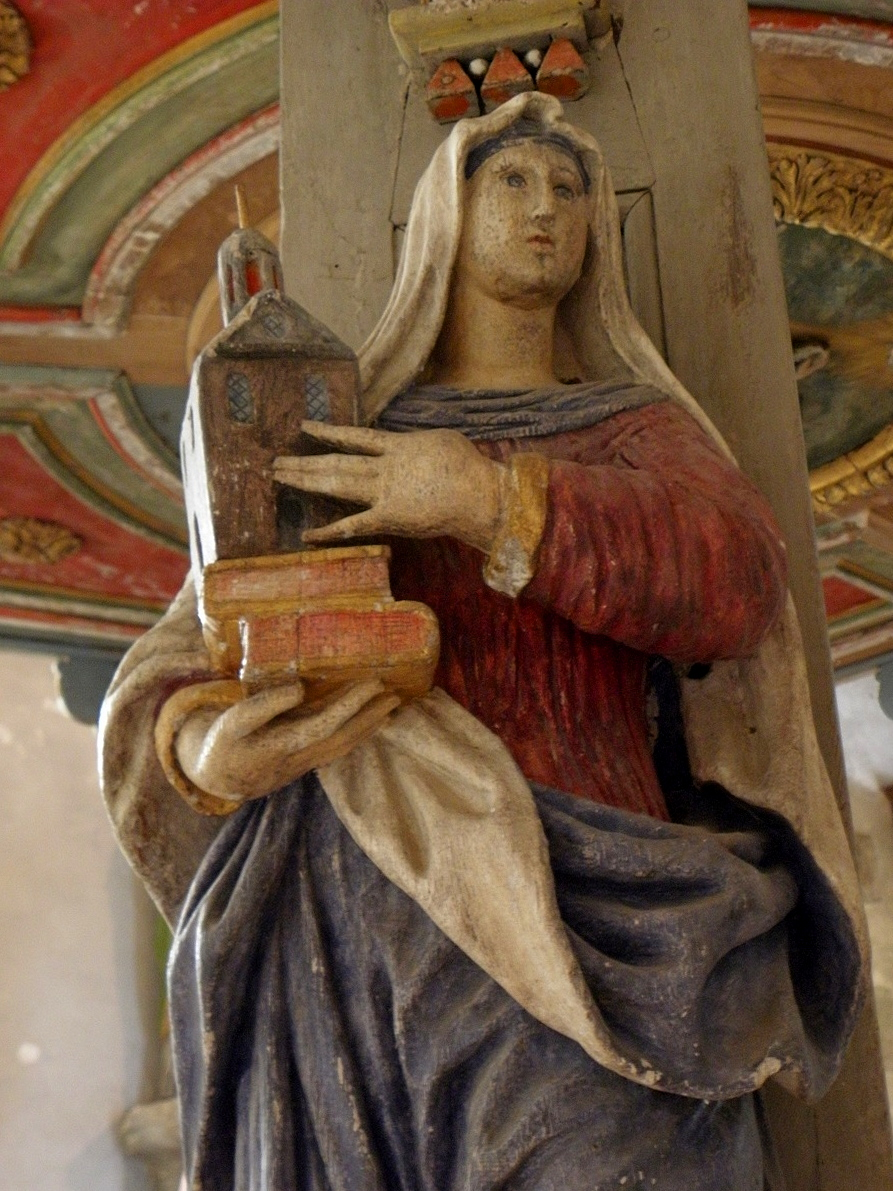
A wood carving, an allegory for "Faith", on one of the five pillars supporting the baldachin.

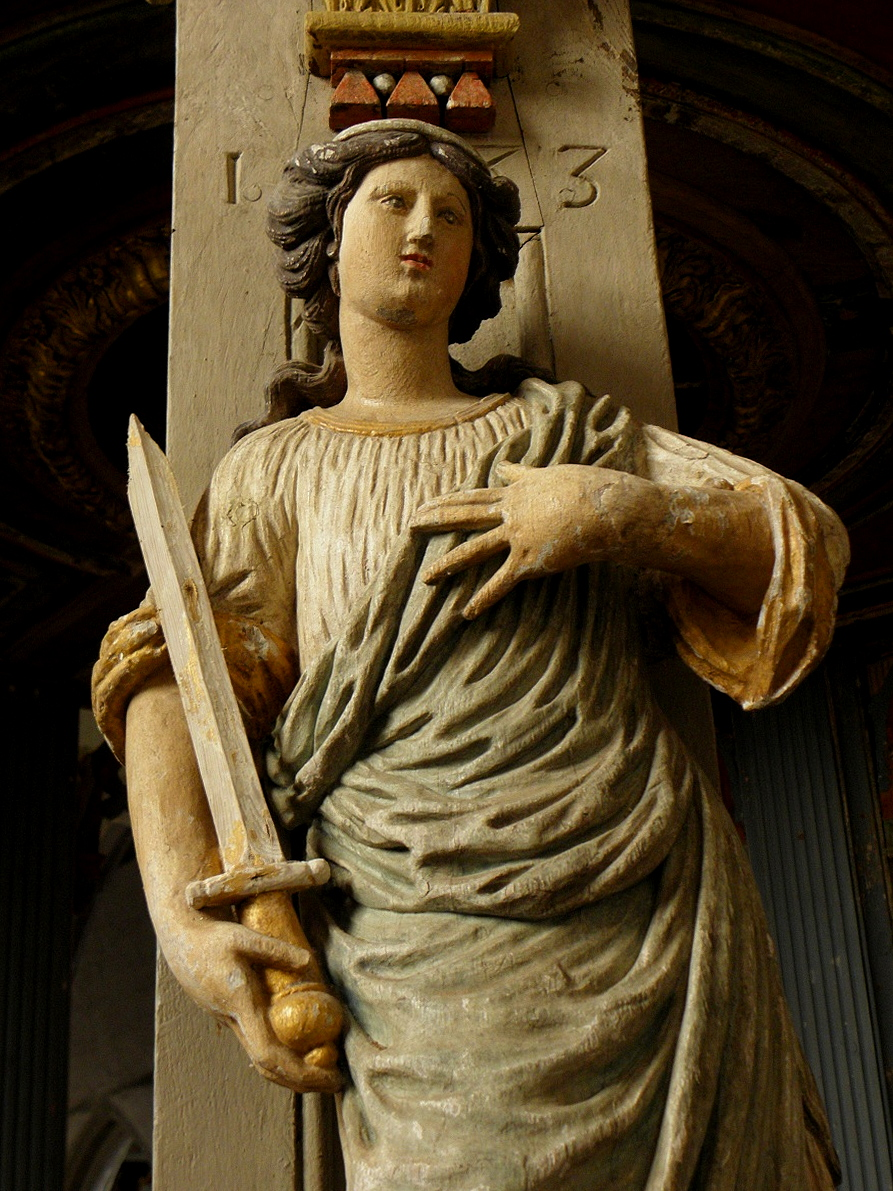
A wood carving, an allegory for "Justice" on one of the five pillars supporting the baldachin.

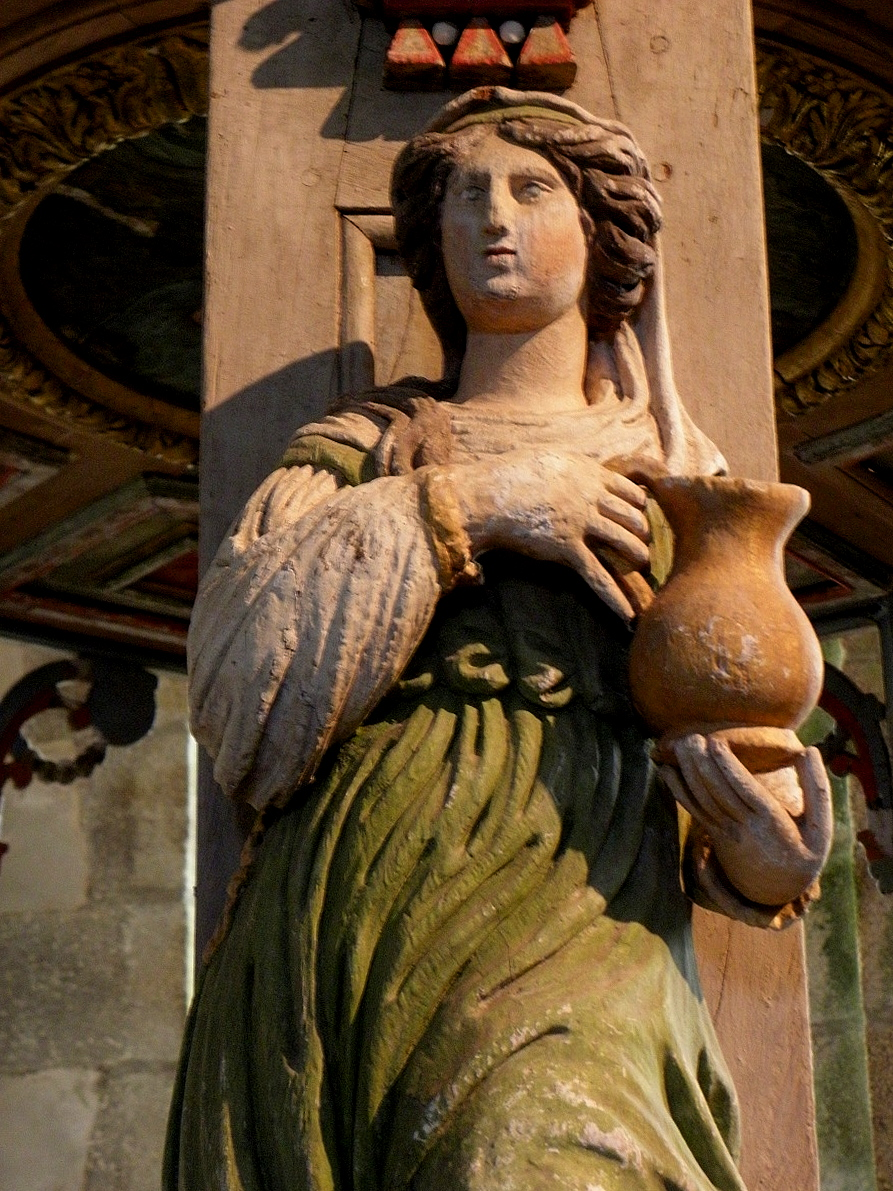
A wood carving, an allegory for "Temperance", on one of the five pillars supporting the baldachin.

== Statuary ==
In the nave are statues of Saint Yves and Saint Roch. The north wall is decorated with statues of Saint Catherine of Alexandria, the Virgin Mary and Saint Bernard. In the south aisle there is an "Ecce Homo" and near the church entrance there is a statue of John the Evangelist.

== Miscellaneous images ==
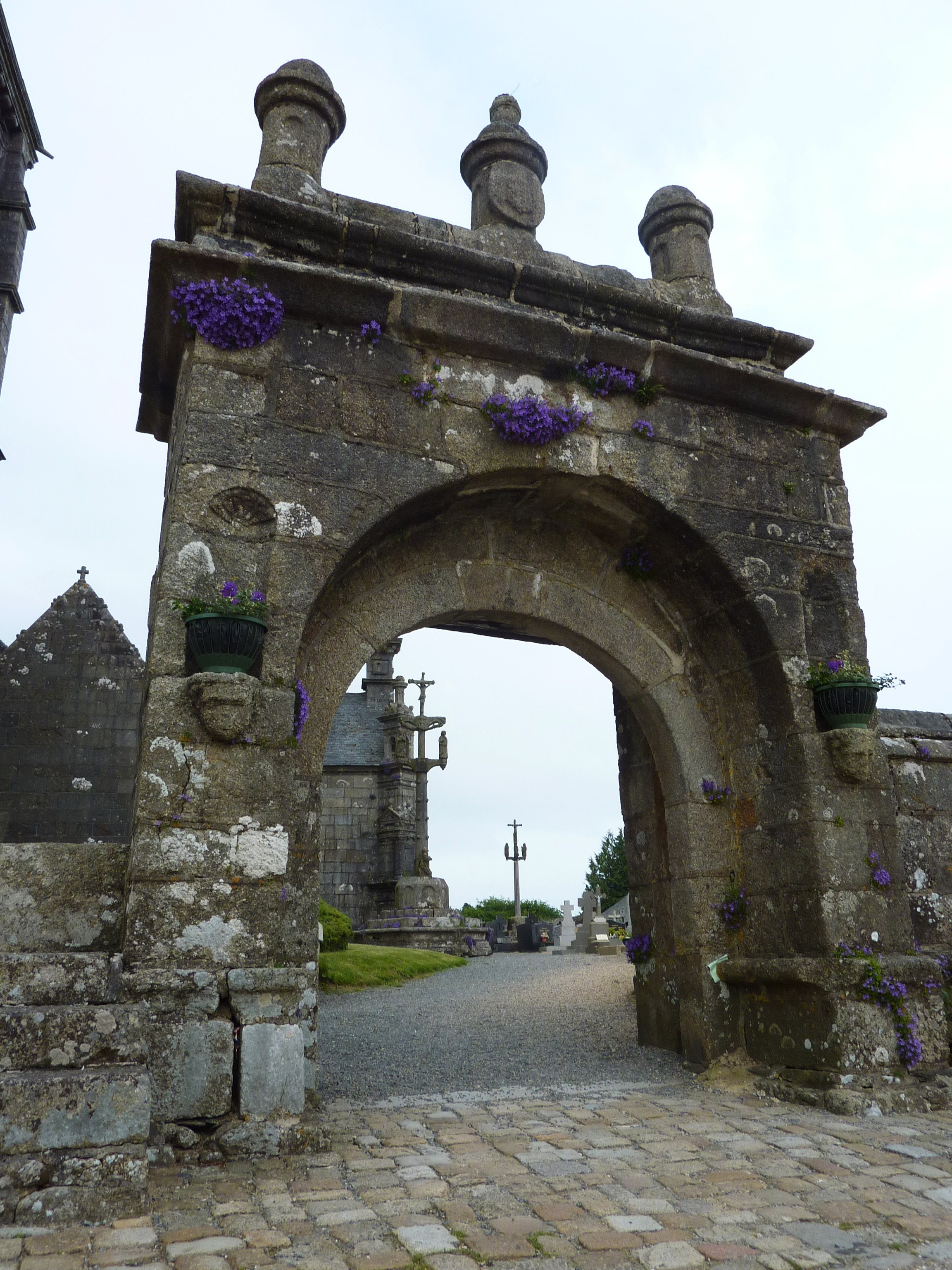
The entrance to the enclos

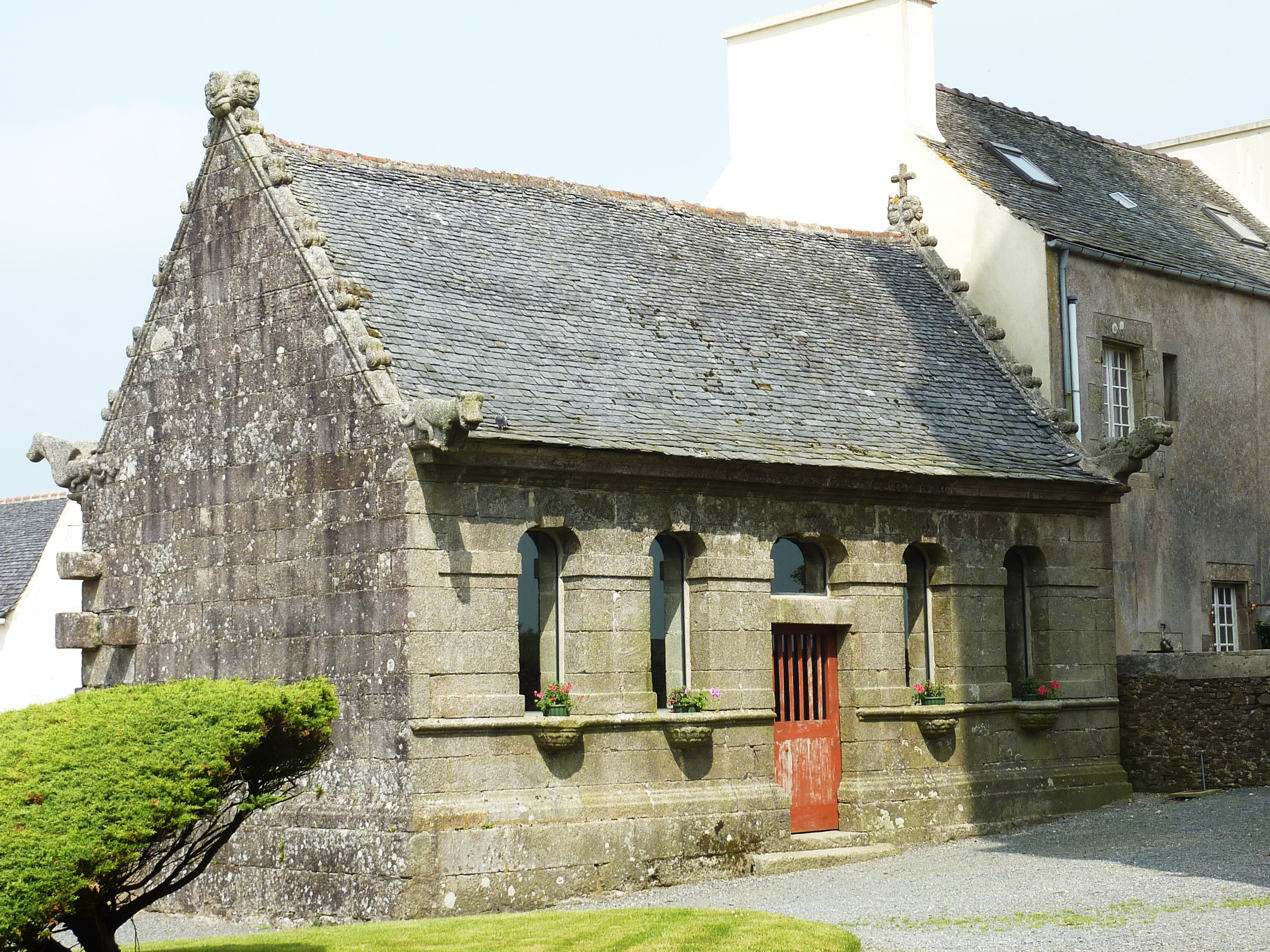
The ossuary

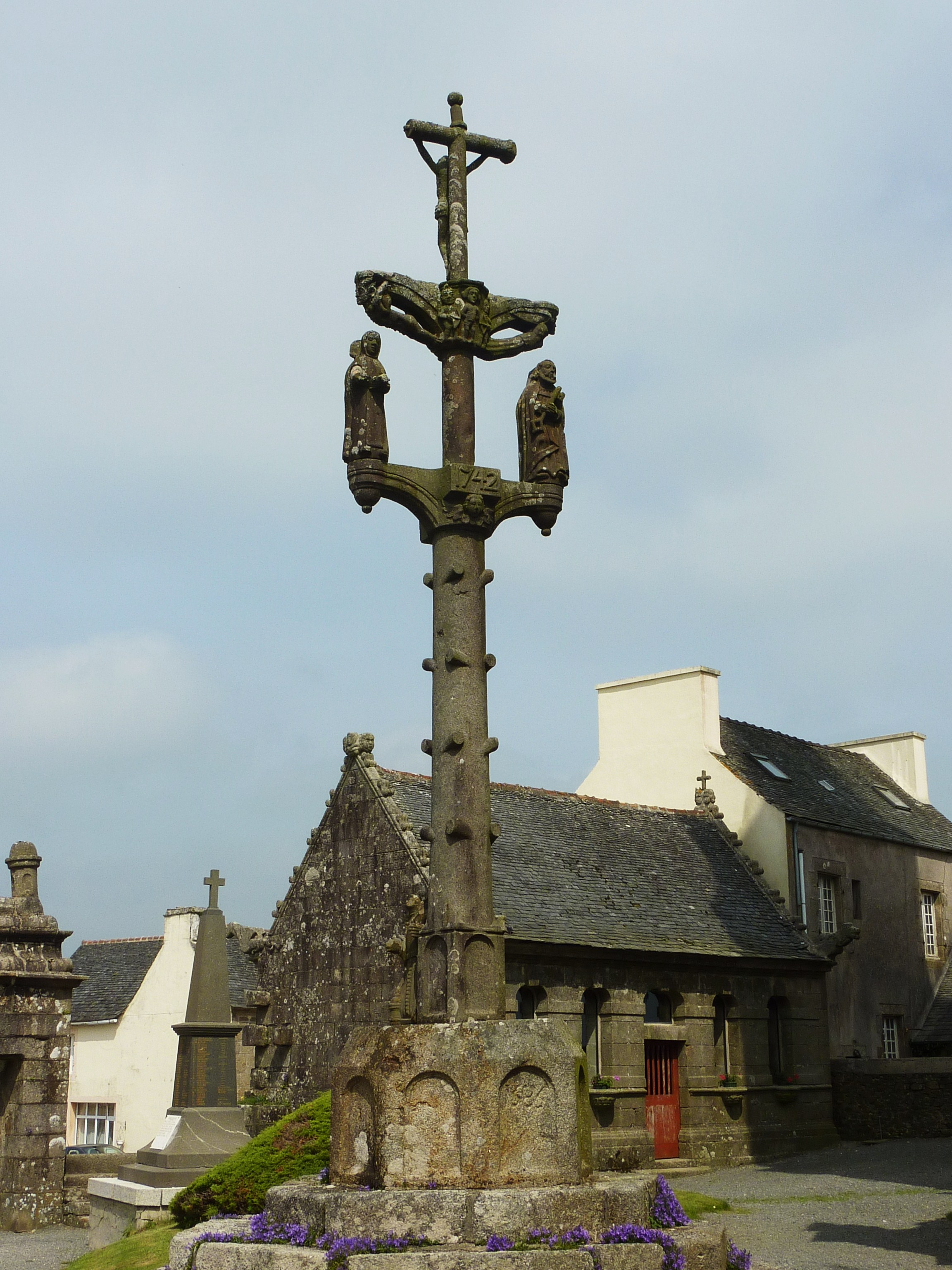
The older of the two calvaries

== See also ==
- Culture of France
- French architecture
- History of France
- Religion in France
- Roman Catholicism in France
