= Commana =

Commana Kommanna
- Commune
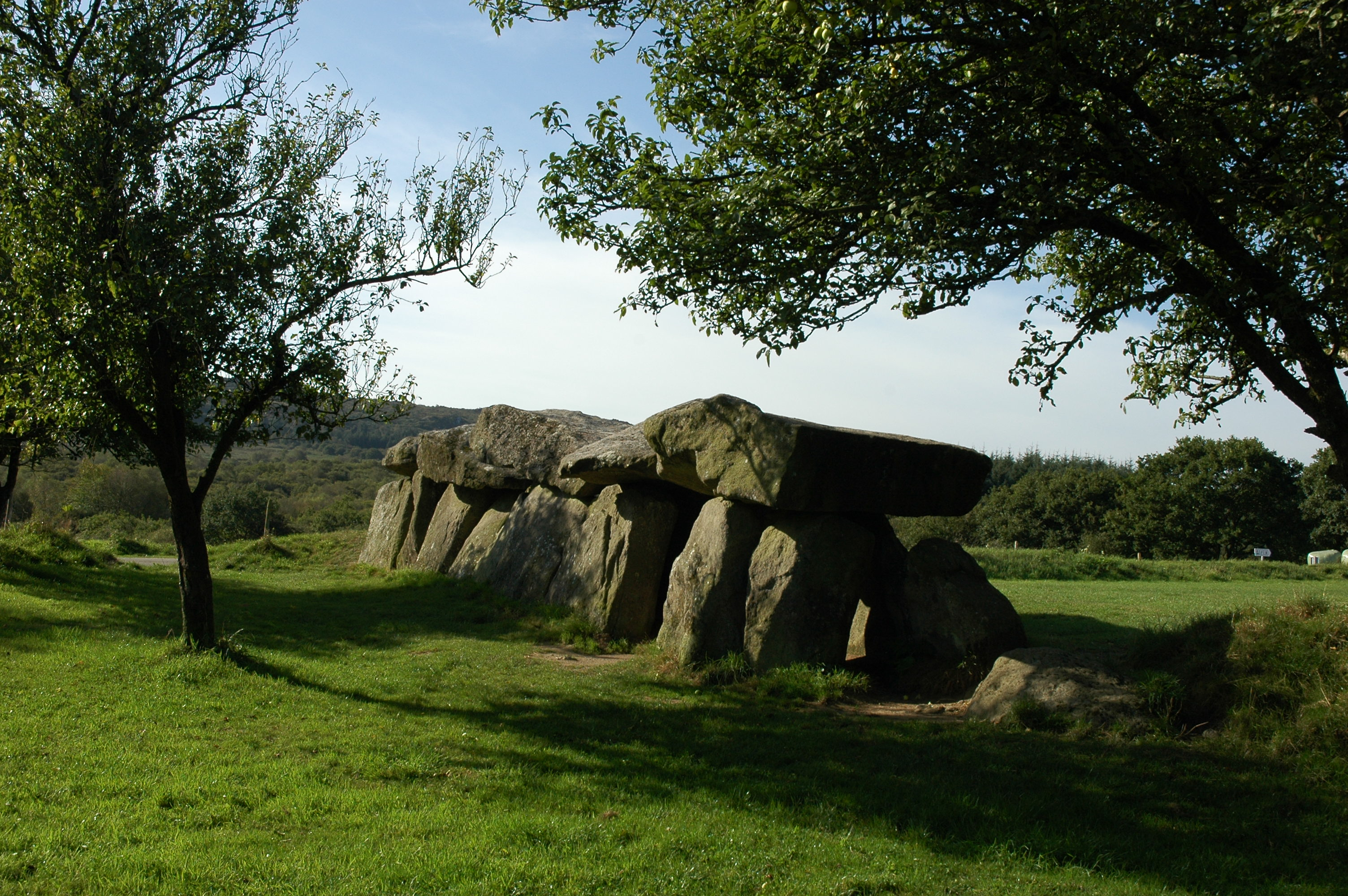
- Mougau Gallery grave

- Coat of arms
- Location of Commana
- Location within France Location within Brittany
- Coordinates: 48°24′51″N 3°57′10″W
- Country: France
- Region: Brittany
- Department: Finistère
- Arrondissement: Morlaix
- Canton: Landivisiau
- Intercommunality: Pays de Landivisiau

Government
  - Mayor (2020–2026): Philippe Guéguen
- Area^{1}: 39.90 km^{2} (15.41 sq mi)
- Highest elevation: 372 m (1,220 ft)
- Lowest elevation: 104 m (341 ft)
- Population (2023): 983
  - Density: 24.6/km^{2} (63.8/sq mi)
- Time zone: UTC+01:00 (CET)
  - Summer (DST): UTC+02:00 (CEST)
- INSEE/Postal code: 29038 /29450
- ^{1} French Land Register data, which excludes lakes, ponds, glaciers > 1 km^{2} (0.386 sq mi or 247 acres) and river estuaries.

Commana (French pronunciation: [kɔmana]; Breton: Kommanna) is a commune in the Finistère department of Brittany in northwestern France.

== Population ==
Historical population
| Year | Pop. | ±% p.a. |
|---|---|---|
| 1968 | 1,370 | — |
| 1975 | 1,262 | −1.17% |
| 1982 | 1,153 | −1.28% |
| 1990 | 1,061 | −1.03% |
| 1999 | 988 | −0.79% |
| 2007 | 1,030 | +0.52% |
| 2012 | 1,108 | +1.47% |
| 2017 | 1,036 | −1.33% |
| 2023 | 983 | −0.87% |
Source: INSEE

Inhabitants of Commana are called in French Commanéens.

== Breton language ==
In 2023, 39.2% of primary-school children attended bilingual schools, where Breton language is taught alongside French.

== See also ==
- Communes of the Finistère department
- Parc naturel régional d'Armorique
- Roland Doré sculptor
- Commana Parish close
