= Loc-Eguiner =

Loc-Eguiner Logeginer-Plouziri
- Commune
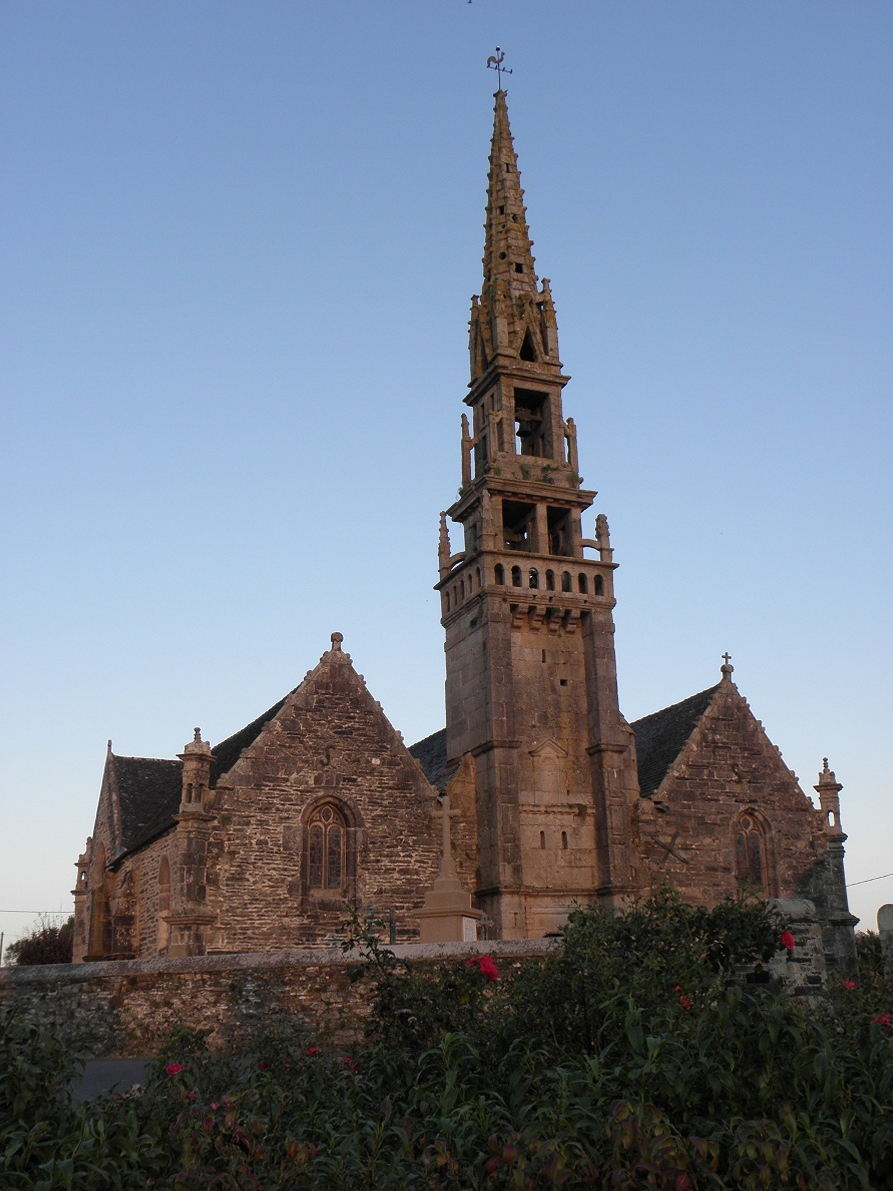
- The parish church of Saint-Éguiner, in Loc-Éguiner

- Coat of arms
- Location of Loc-Eguiner
- Location within France Location within Brittany
- Coordinates: 48°28′28″N 4°05′36″W
- Country: France
- Region: Brittany
- Department: Finistère
- Arrondissement: Morlaix
- Canton: Landivisiau
- Intercommunality: Pays de Landivisiau

Government
  - Mayor (2020–2026): Henri Billon
- Area^{1}: 11.90 km^{2} (4.59 sq mi)
- Highest elevation: 178 m (584 ft)
- Lowest elevation: 27 m (89 ft)
- Population (2023): 376
  - Density: 31.6/km^{2} (81.8/sq mi)
- Time zone: UTC+01:00 (CET)
  - Summer (DST): UTC+02:00 (CEST)
- INSEE/Postal code: 29128 /29400
- ^{1} French Land Register data, which excludes lakes, ponds, glaciers > 1 km^{2} (0.386 sq mi or 247 acres) and river estuaries.

Loc-Eguiner (French pronunciation: [lɔk eɡinɛʁ]; Breton: Logeginer-Plouziri) is a commune in the Finistère department of Brittany in north-western France.

== Population ==
Inhabitants of Loc-Eguiner are called in French Loguisiens.

== See also ==
- Communes of the Finistère department
- Loc-Eguiner Parish close
