= Canton of Landivisiau =

Coordinates: 48.51°N 4.07°W

The canton of Landivisiau is an administrative division of the Finistère department, northwestern France. Its borders were modified at the French canton reorganisation which came into effect in March 2015. Its seat is in Landivisiau.

It consists of the following communes:

1. Bodilis
2. Commana
3. Guiclan
4. Guimiliau
5. Lampaul-Guimiliau
6. Landivisiau
7. Loc-Eguiner
8. Locmélar
9. Plougar
10. Plougourvest
11. Plounéventer
12. Plouvorn
13. Plouzévédé
14. Saint-Derrien
15. Saint-Sauveur
16. Saint-Servais
17. Saint-Vougay
18. Sizun
19. Trézilidé
