= Locmélar =

Locmélar Lokmelar
- Commune
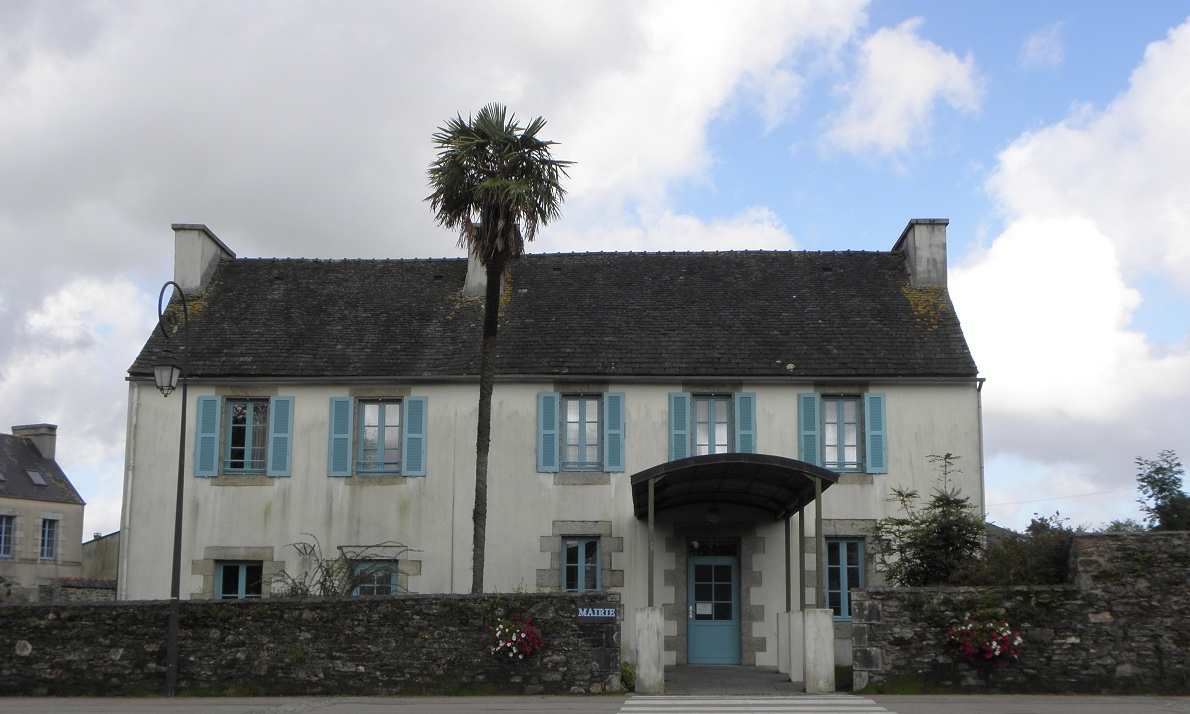
- The town hall in Locmélar

- Coat of arms
- Location of Locmélar
- Location within France Location within Brittany
- Coordinates: 48°27′15″N 4°03′50″W
- Country: France
- Region: Brittany
- Department: Finistère
- Arrondissement: Morlaix
- Canton: Landivisiau
- Intercommunality: Pays de Landivisiau

Government
  - Mayor (2020–2026): Bruno Cadiou
- Area^{1}: 15.55 km^{2} (6.00 sq mi)
- Highest elevation: 191 m (627 ft)
- Lowest elevation: 47 m (154 ft)
- Population (2023): 487
  - Density: 31.3/km^{2} (81.1/sq mi)
- Time zone: UTC+01:00 (CET)
  - Summer (DST): UTC+02:00 (CEST)
- INSEE/Postal code: 29131 /29400
- ^{1} French Land Register data, which excludes lakes, ponds, glaciers > 1 km^{2} (0.386 sq mi or 247 acres) and river estuaries.

Locmélar (French pronunciation: [lɔkmelaʁ]; Breton: Lokmelar) is a commune in the Finistère department of Brittany in north-western France.

== Toponymy ==
From the Breton loc which means hermitage (cf.: Locminé) and Mélar who is a Breton saint.

== Population ==
Historical population
Year	Pop.	±% p.a.
1968	445	—
1975	356	−3.14%
1982	349	−0.28%
1990	455	+3.37%
1999	469	+0.34%
2007	427	−1.17%
2012	444	+0.78%
2017	471	+1.19%
2023	487	+0.56%
Source: INSEE

Inhabitants of Locmélar are called in French Locmélariens.

== See also ==
- Communes of the Finistère department
- List of the works of the Maître de Thégonnec
- Locmélar Parish close
- List of the works of the Maître de Plougastel
