= Loc-Eguiner Church =

Coordinates: 48.4727°N 4.0941°W

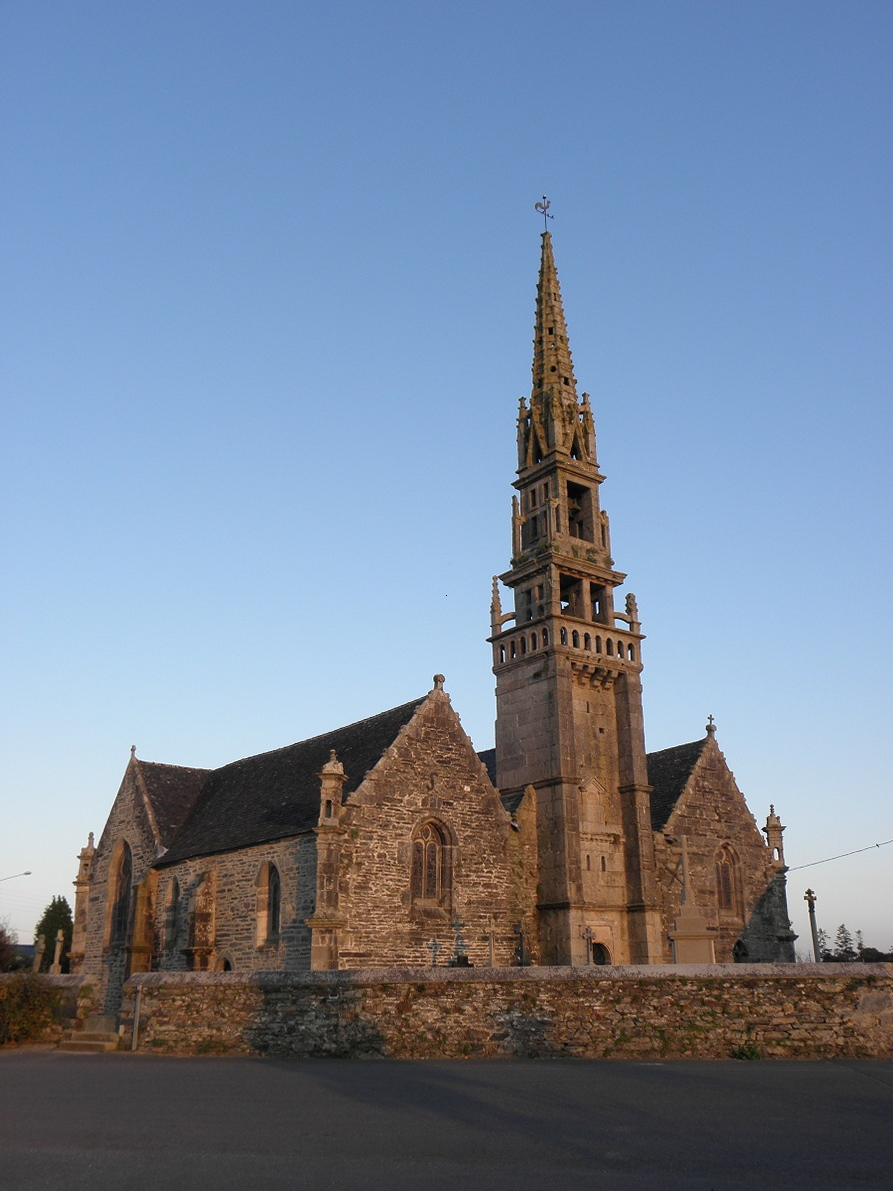
View of church at Loc-Éguiner

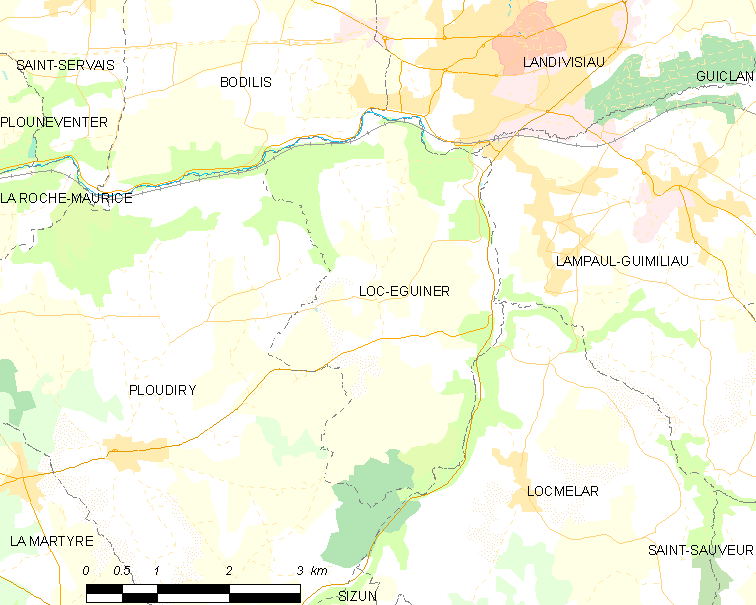
Map showing location Loc-Éguiner

The Saint Eguiner Church (French: Église Saint-Eguiner) is a church in Loc-Eguiner in the arrondissement of Brest in Brittany in north-western France. What was the chapel of the Rosnyvinen family became the parish church of Loc-Eguiner and was erected in stages between 1577 and 1631. It is a listed historical monument since 1927.

== Description ==
It was dedicated to Saint Éguiner. The church has an inscription at the entrance to the choir on the evangelist side which reads " "Dimanche 1er jour de juillet l'an 1577 fut dédiée ceste église, était lors Yven Gouverneur" and there is another inscription on the bell-tower which reads "Anno Domini 1591, Die V JulII Hec Turris Fud". There are two altarpieces in the church. One depicts Saint Louis de Gonzague at prayer and the other depicts the crowning of the Virgin Mary. The baptismal fonts date to 1641. Inside the church are statues of Saints Éguiner, Corentin, Yves, Joseph, Anne, Michel and the Virgin Mary. On the north side of church there is a 15th-century cross with the Virgin Mary reversed with the crucified Christ at the top.

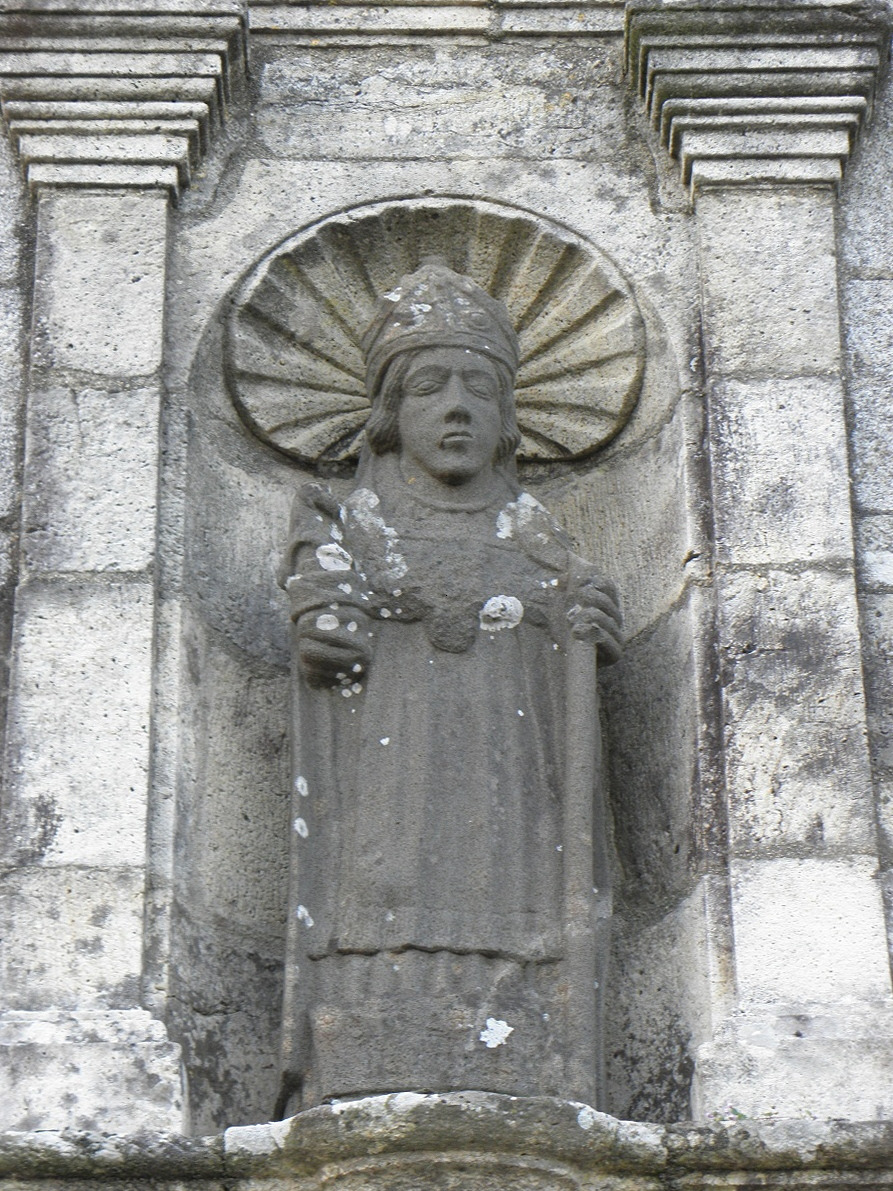
Statue of Saint Éguiner in the church porch.

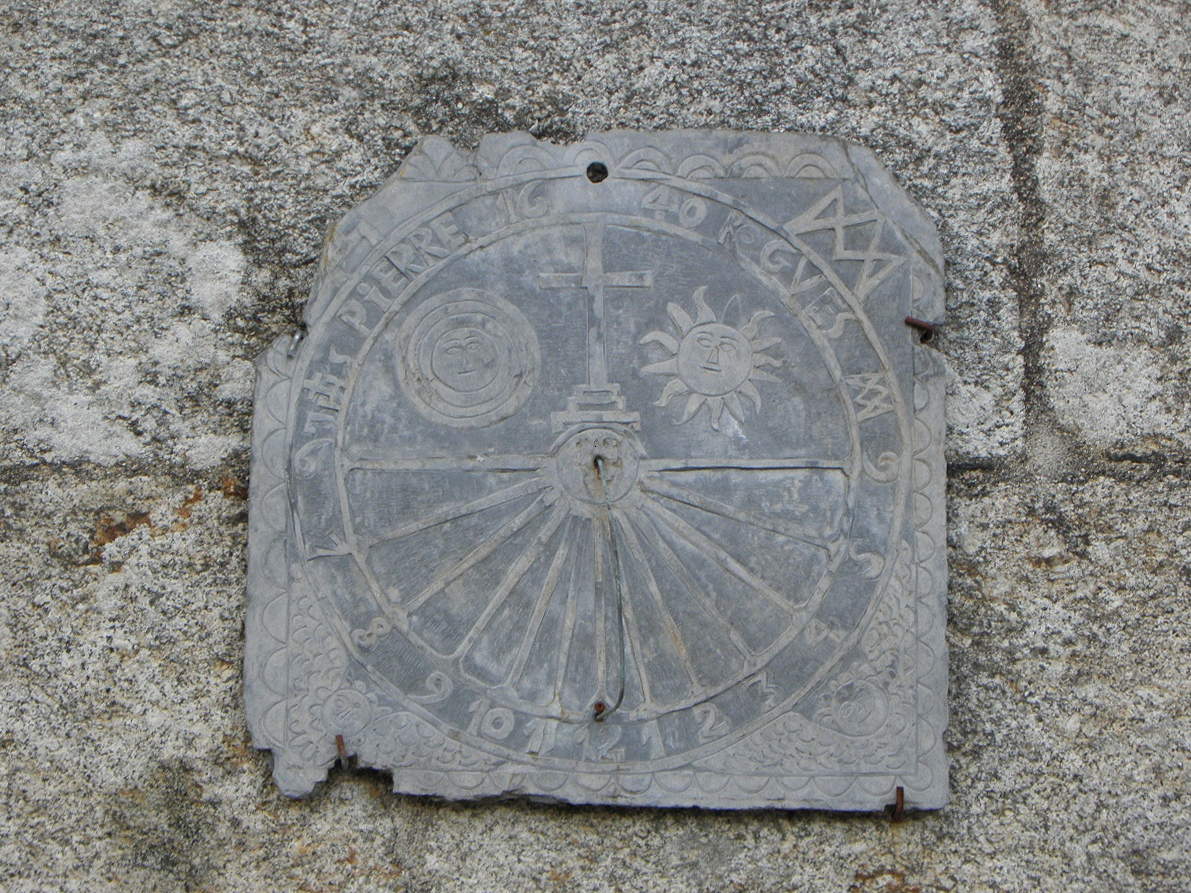
The church sun-dial

== Notes ==
The patron saint of the parish, Saint Éguiner, was said to have been the son of an Irish king, banished from Ireland for having embraced the Christian religion. He travelled to Brittany where he was so well received that he returned to Ireland to convince others to join him. He founded a hermitage near Pluvigner in Morbihan to where his relics were sent after his death. Disciples of Saint Patrick, Éguiner and his colleagues lived as hermits but were executed in 455 on the orders of a prince called Théodoric.
