= Locmélar Parish close =

Coordinates: 48.4530°N 4.0659°W

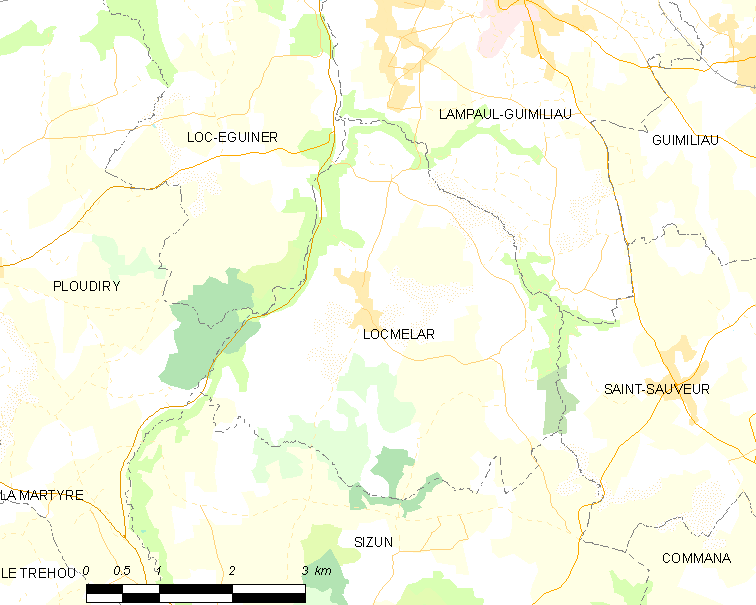
Map showing location Locmélar

The Locmélar Parish close (Enclos paroissial) is located at Locmélar in the arrondissement of Morlaix in Brittany in north-western France. It is a listed historical monument since 1934.

== The calvary ==
The calvary dates to 1600 and was restored by the sculptor Donnart in 1925. It is 6 metres high and on the crosspiece beneath that depicting Christ on the cross there are statues of the Virgin Mary reversed with Mary Magdalene, and John the Evangelist reversed with Saint Peter, on either side of a "Vierge de Pitié" reversed with a "Christ enseignant". On the upper crosspiece, Christ on the cross is reversed with a statue of Jesus waiting to be charged with carrying the cross ("Christ lié") and on either side of the crucified Christ are a horseman and a robber hanging from a gibbet.

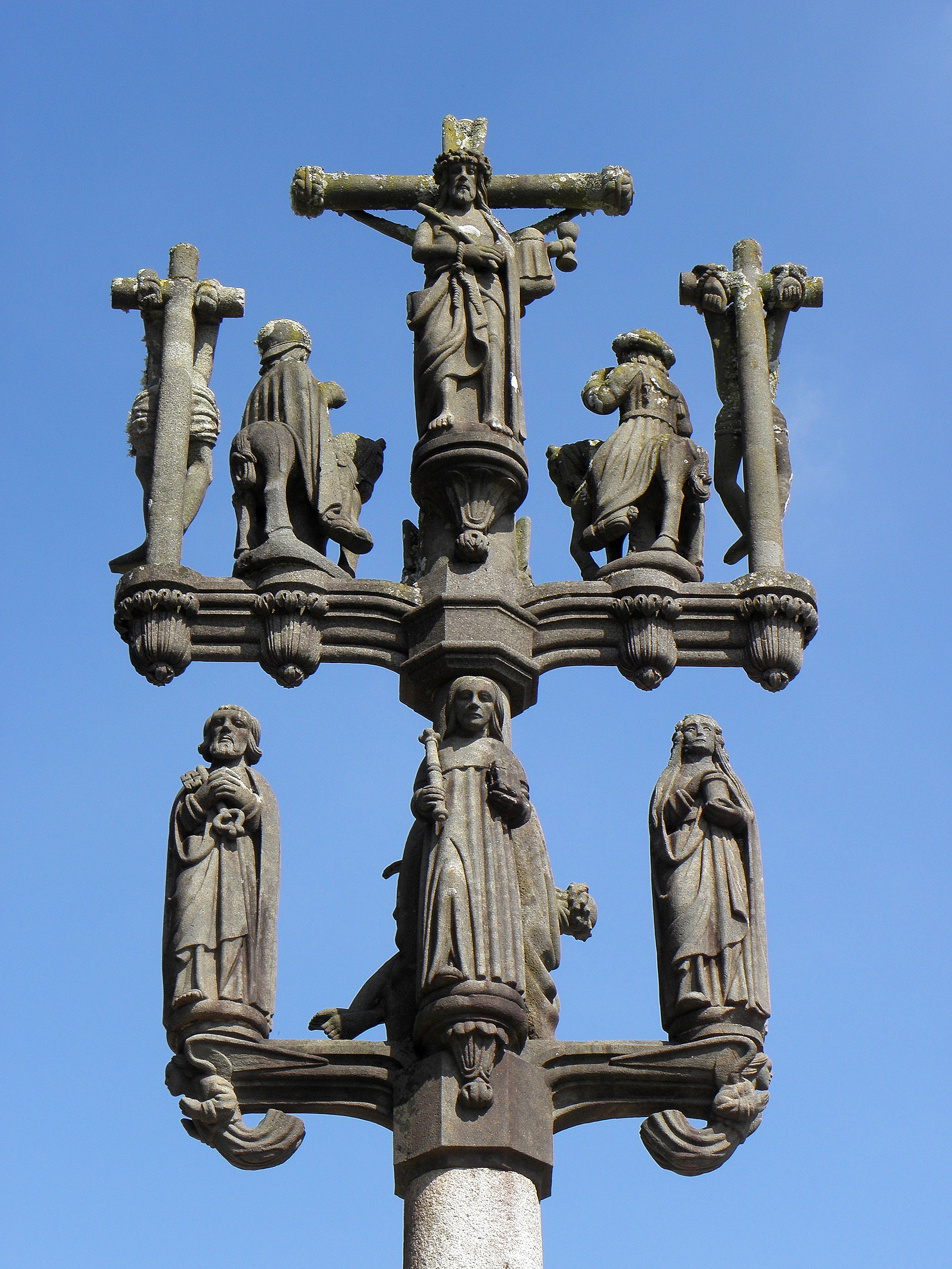
The calvary at Locmélar

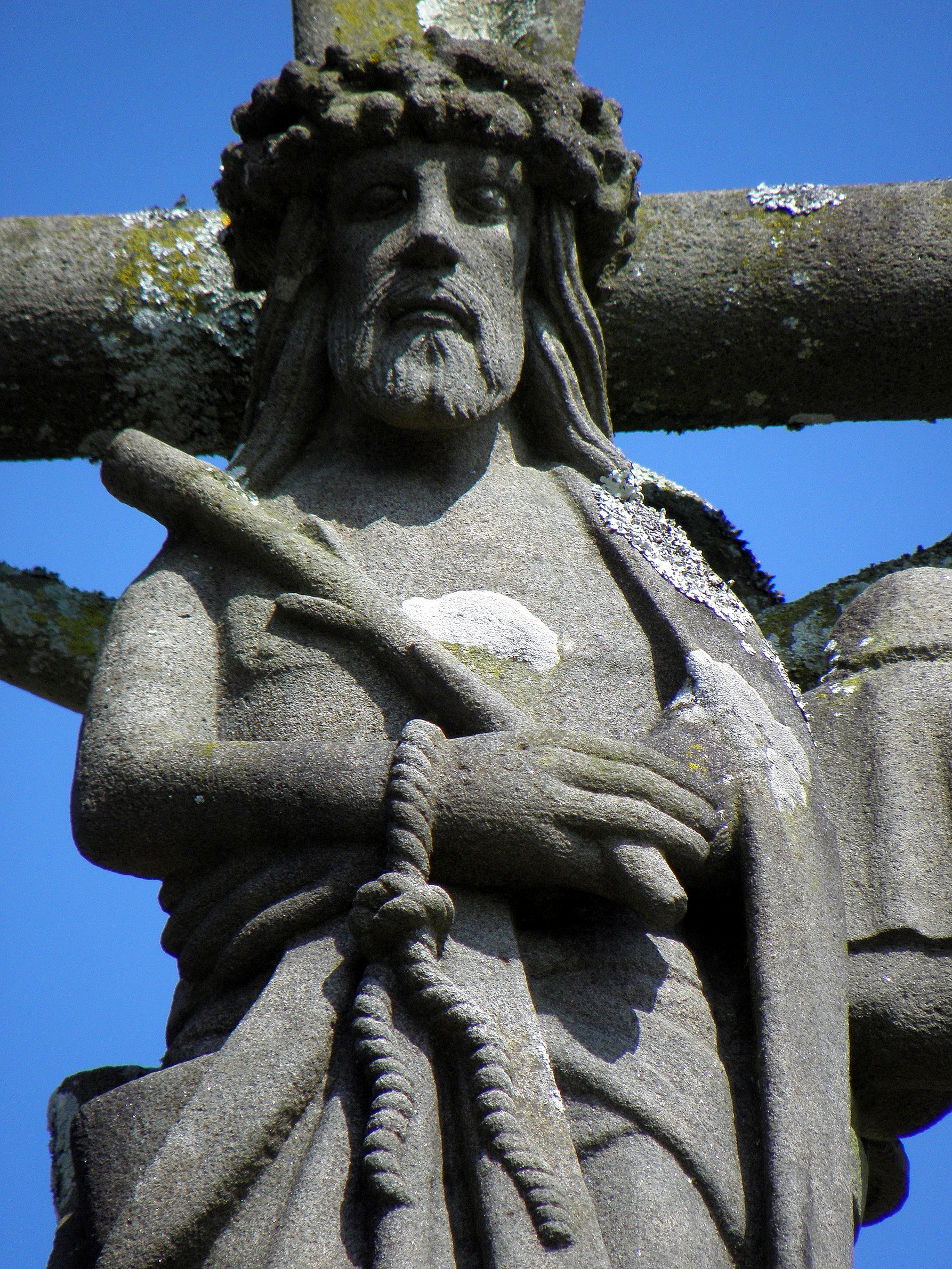
Jesus awaits his crucifixion.

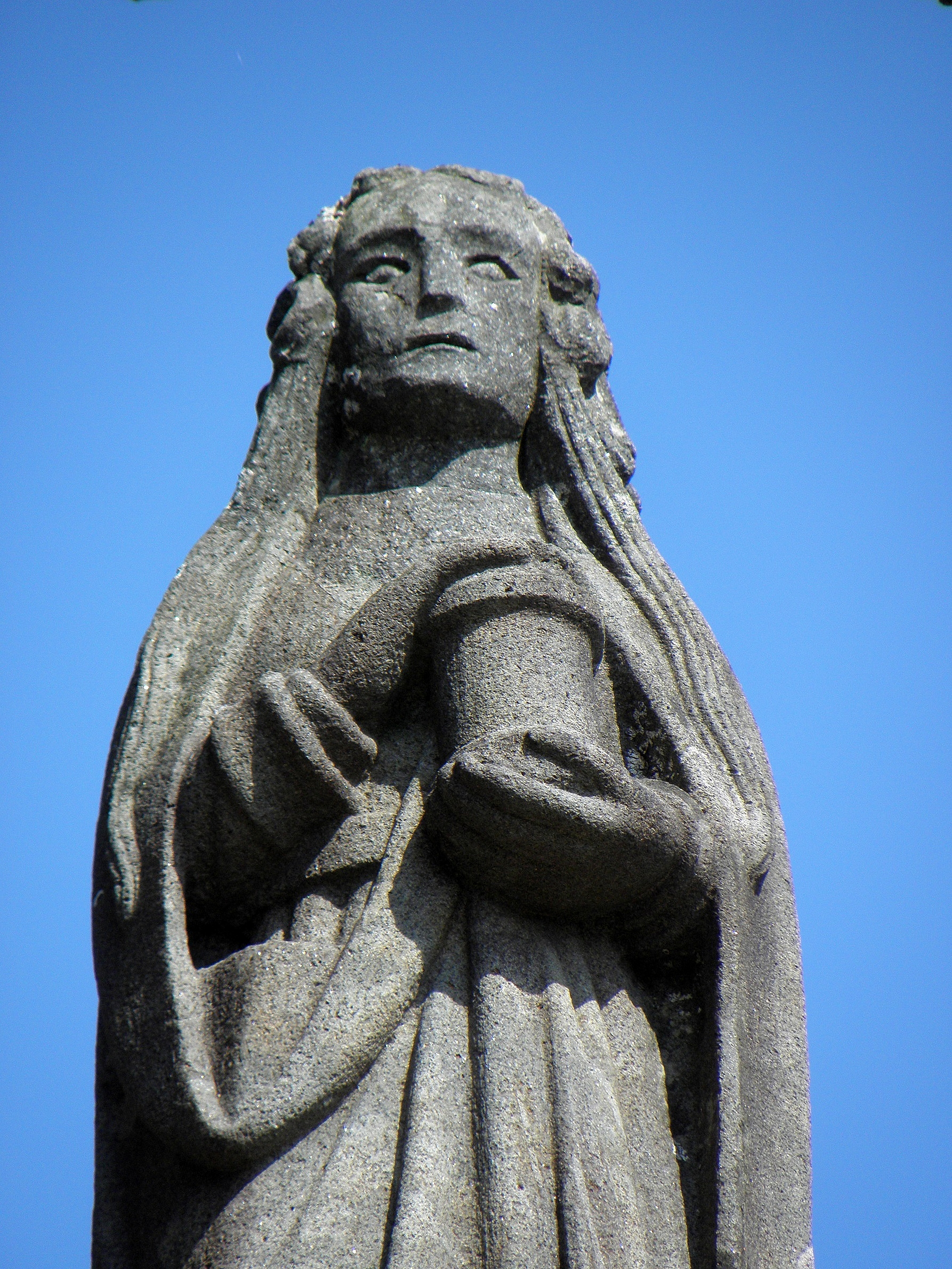
Mary Magdalene clutches her pot of embalming oil

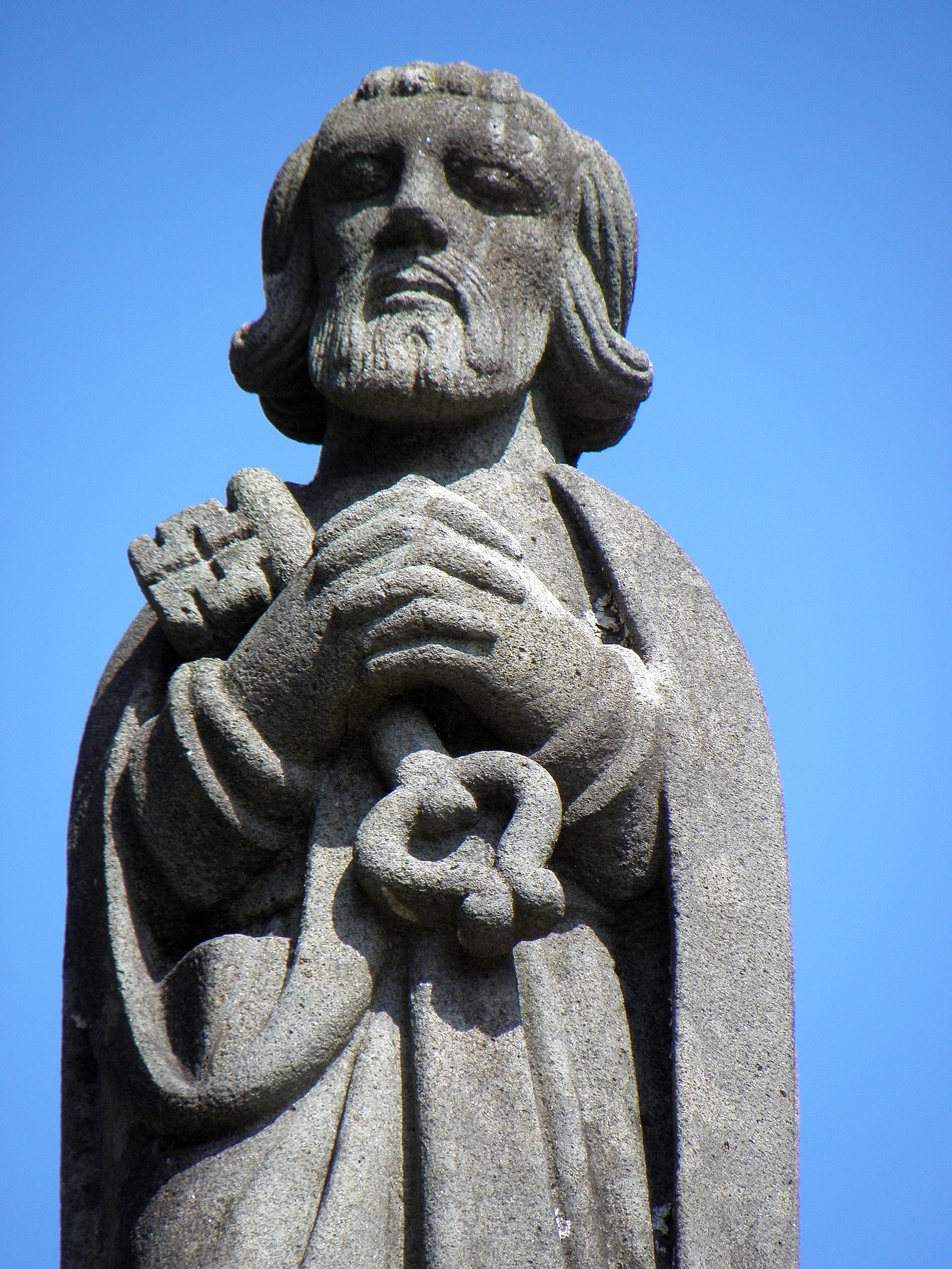
Saint Peter with his key

== The church ==
The ossuary was demolished in 1920. The church itself was built between the 16th and 17th century. The west door dates to 1577 and the south porch with its statue of John the Evangelist dates to 1664. The choir and transepts are furnished with 17th century altarpieces. The altarpiece by the altar depicts scenes from the passion with a central tableau recalling the death of Mélar at the hands of Kerioltan and other events of his life. At the top of this altarpiece there is a statue of Christ surrounded by angels and surmounted by a depiction of the Holy Father. Niches hold statues of Saint Mélar and the Virgin Mary with child. The altarpiece dedicated to the Assumption is in the north transept and has at the centre a tableau depicting Christ's tomb surrounded by the twelve apostles with a statue of the Virgin Mary above it. She is surrounded by angels. In the south transept there is an altarpiece dedicated to Saint Hervé. The blind saint is being led by his guide Guic'haran and they are accompanied by a wolf. The tableau is surmounted by a statue of the Holy Father. The church has a baptismal font dating to 1612 with a baldachin on six columns. At the top there is a sculpture depicting Saint Michael fighting the dragon surrounded by statues depicting the six virtues.

== The bell-tower ==
This is built in the Beaumanoir style and dates to 1589. The porch has twelve empty niches inside; outside are three niches with a statue of Christ placed in the central niche.

== Statuary ==
The oldest statue in the church is a carving in wood of the Virgin Mary with child, which is thought to date from the 15th century. There is also a remarkable piéta thought to be Flemish.

== Gallery ==
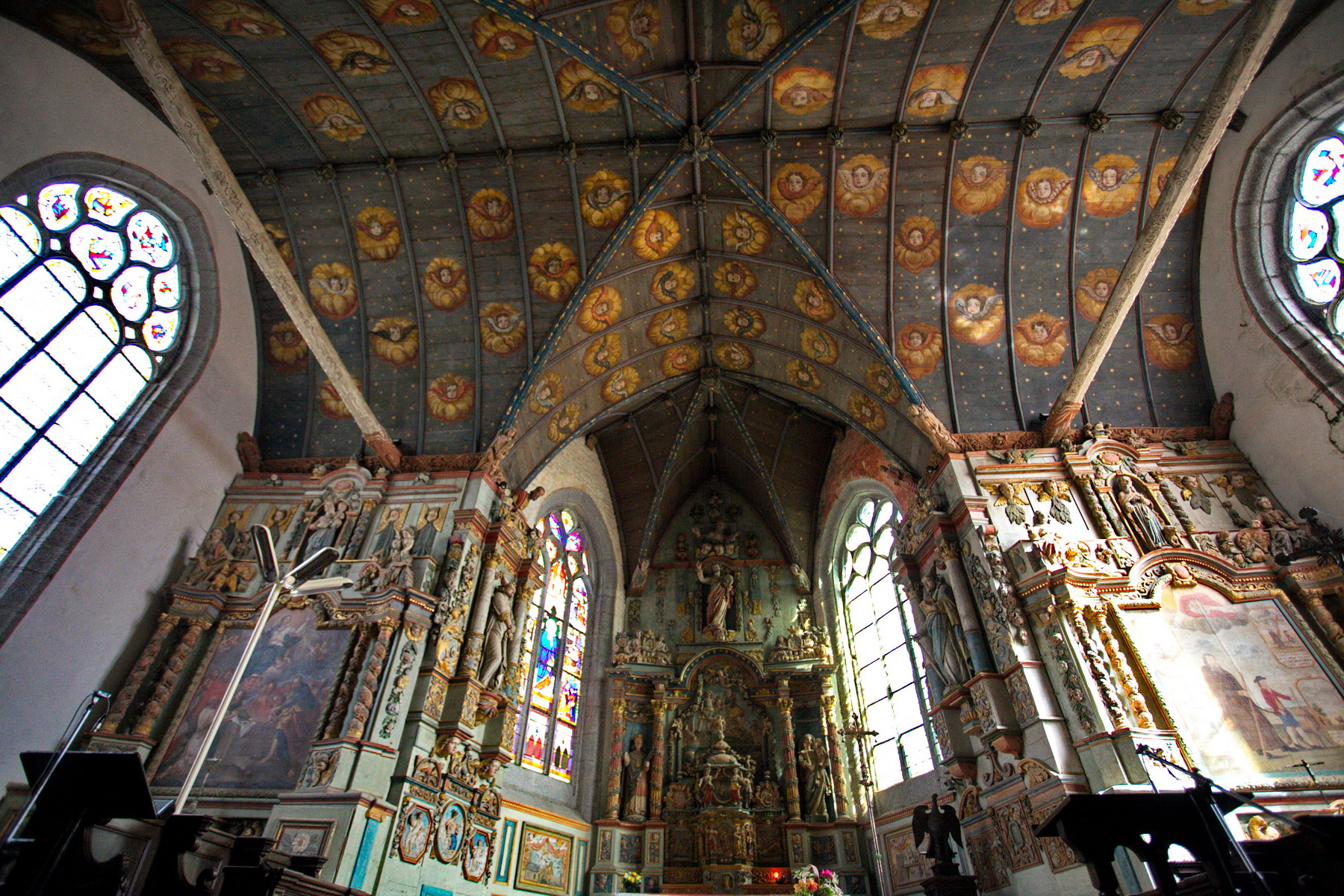
View inside church

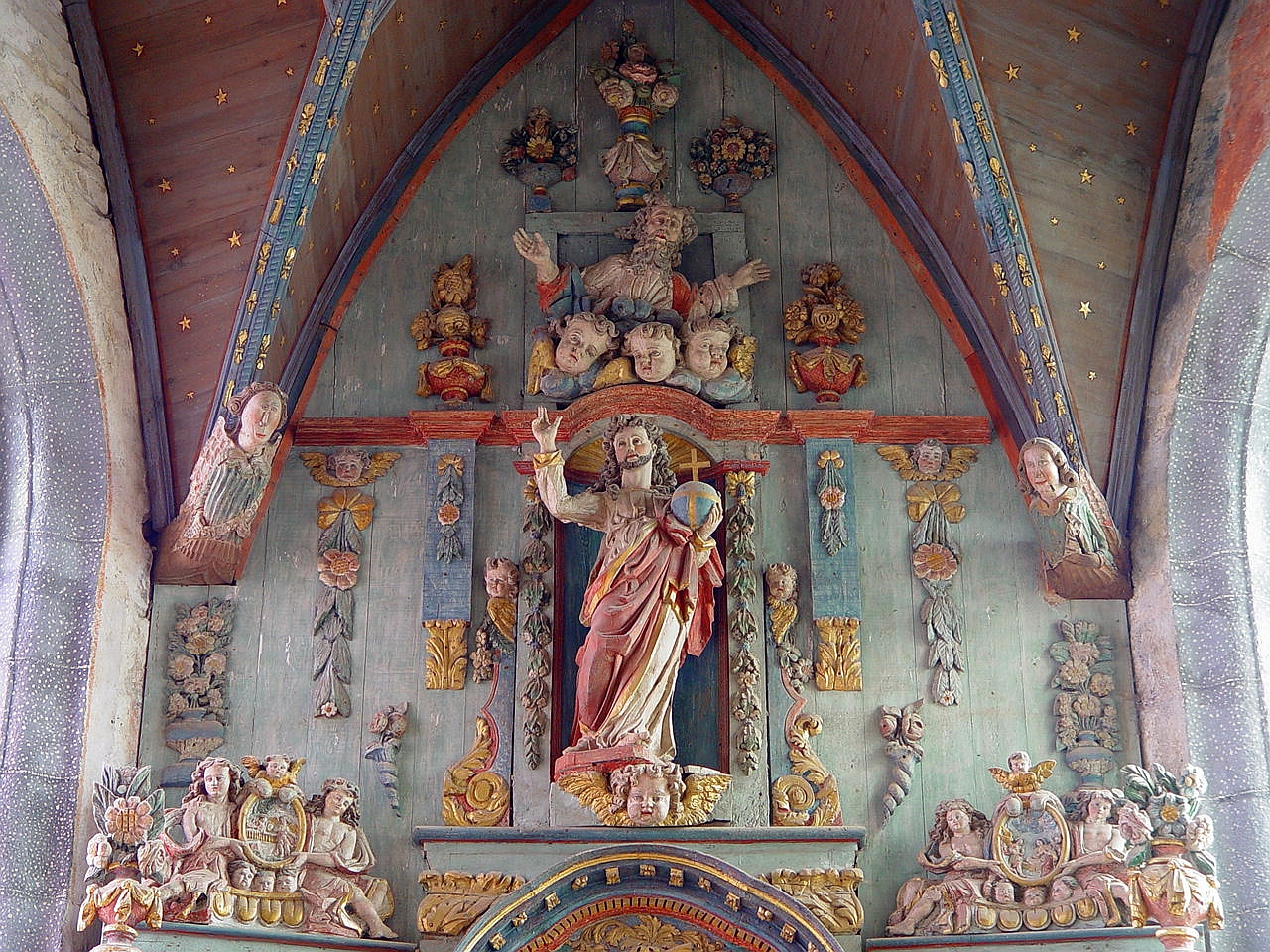
View above the main altar

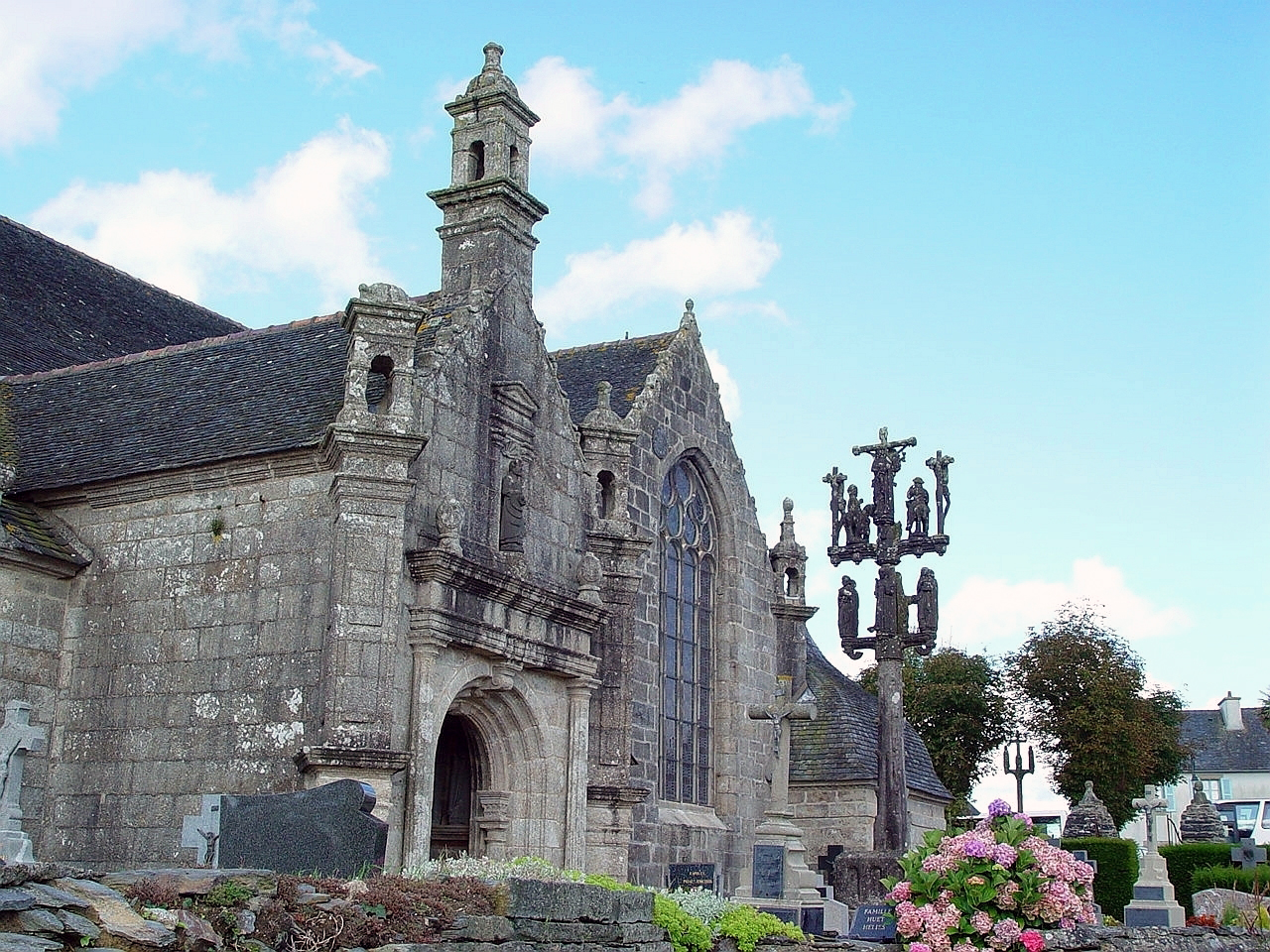
View of south porch

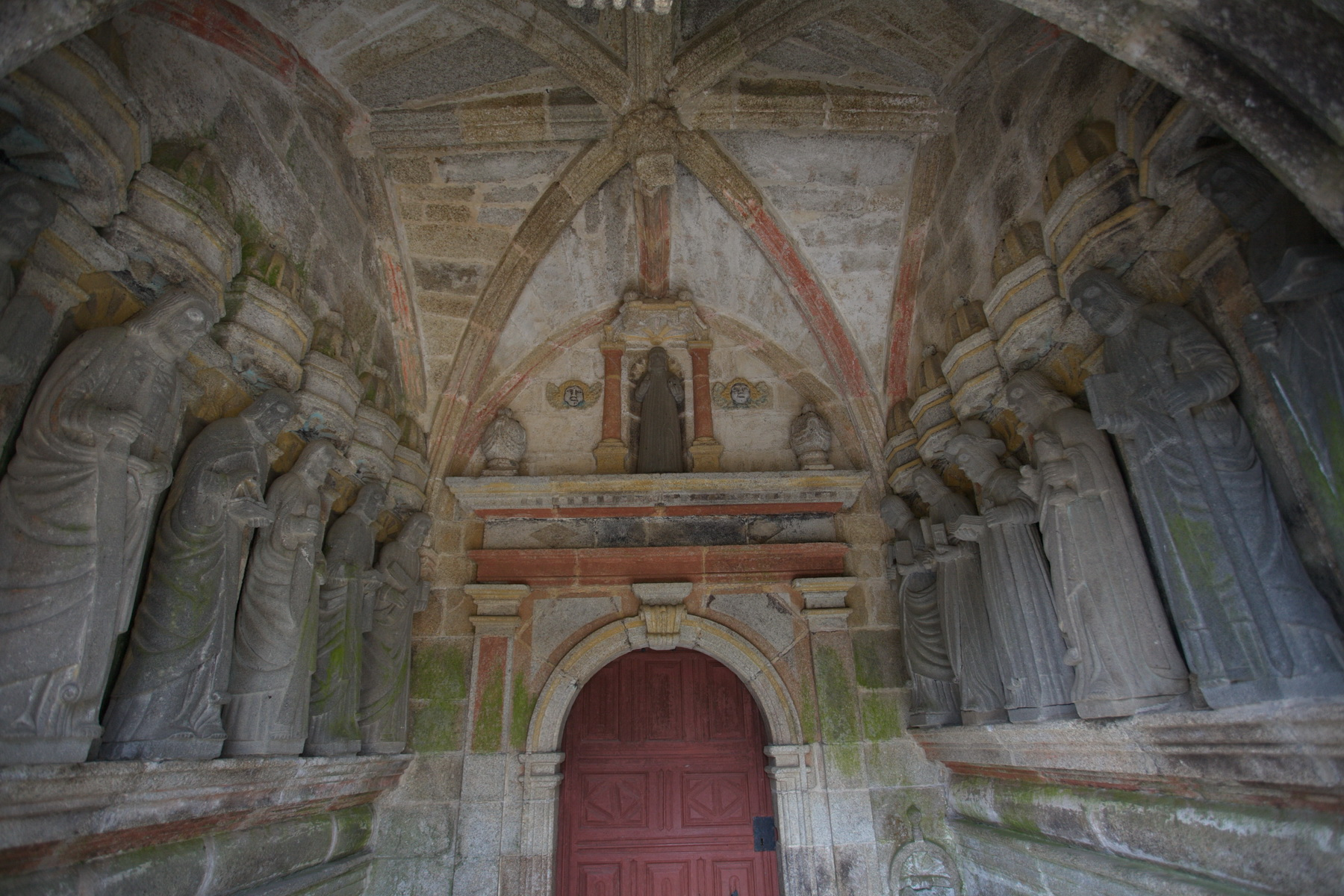
Inside the south porch.

== Carved panels depicting the Passion ==
The church contains a remarkable bas-relief carved panel in nine parts, each having a scene from the passion. In the three panels at the base are depictions of Jesus' entry into Jerusalem, the garden at Gethsemane and Jesus' arrest. In the three central panels we see Judas identifying Jesus with a kiss, Jesus carrying the cross and the attack on Malchus. In the upper panels we see Jesus brought before Caïphe, the crucifixion and the Last Supper. The panels are thought to date to 1577 and could have come from an old altarpiece.

== Notes ==
Note 1. Breton legend recounts that Melor was only seven when his uncle, Riwal, murdered his father, St Miliau or Milio. Riwal also wanted Melor killed but was persuaded not to act by a council of bishops. Riwal decided instead to maim the boy, cutting off his right hand (later replaced by a silver prosthesis) and left foot (replaced with one of bronze). Melor was then sent away to Quimper Abbey to be educated. Here, his metal limbs began to work as if they were natural, and to grow along with him. By the time the prince was fourteen, Riwal decided that he must die and ordered his guardian, Cerialtan, to kill him. The boy was decapitated. Riwal is said to have touched the severed head and to have died three days after. The cult of St Melor in Brittany grew to considerable importance and there are a number of place names and dedications to him including Locmélar.
