= Saint-Vougay =

Saint-Vougay Sant-Nouga
- Commune
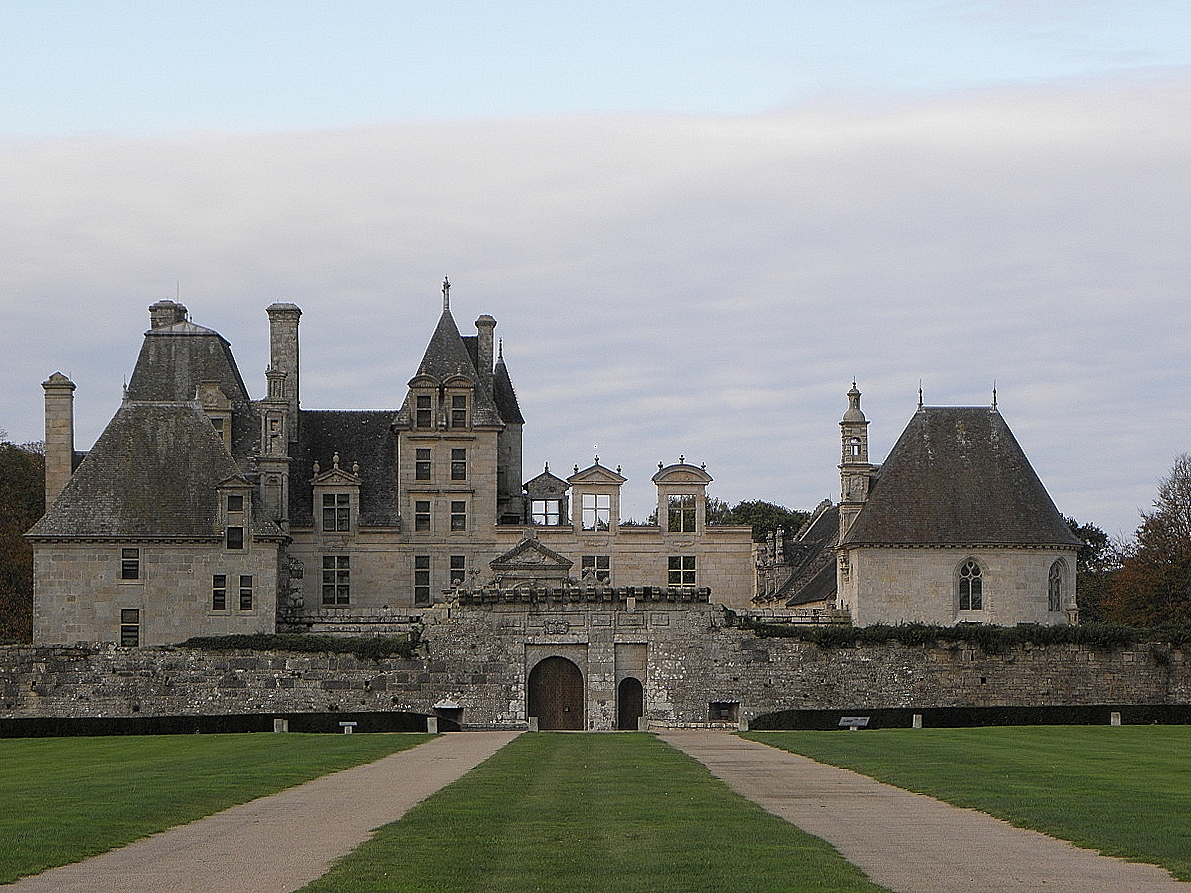
- General view of the Château de Kerjean, in Saint-Vougay
- Location of Saint-Vougay
- Location within France Location within Brittany
- Coordinates: 48°35′43″N 4°08′14″W
- Country: France
- Region: Brittany
- Department: Finistère
- Arrondissement: Morlaix
- Canton: Landivisiau
- Intercommunality: Pays de Landivisiau

Government
  - Mayor (2020–2026): Marie-Claire Hénaff
- Area^{1}: 15.10 km^{2} (5.83 sq mi)
- Highest elevation: 102 m (335 ft)
- Lowest elevation: 54 m (177 ft)
- Population (2023): 873
  - Density: 57.8/km^{2} (150/sq mi)
- Time zone: UTC+01:00 (CET)
  - Summer (DST): UTC+02:00 (CEST)
- INSEE/Postal code: 29271 /29440
- ^{1} French Land Register data, which excludes lakes, ponds, glaciers > 1 km^{2} (0.386 sq mi or 247 acres) and river estuaries.

Saint-Vougay (French pronunciation: [sɛ̃ vuɡɛ]; Breton: Sant-Nouga) is a commune in the Finistère department of Brittany in north-western France.

== Population ==
Inhabitants of Saint-Vougay are called in French Saint-Vougaisiens.

== See also ==
- Communes of the Finistère department
- Yann Larhantec Sculptor
