= Saint-Derrien =

Saint-Derrien Sant-Derc'hen
- Commune
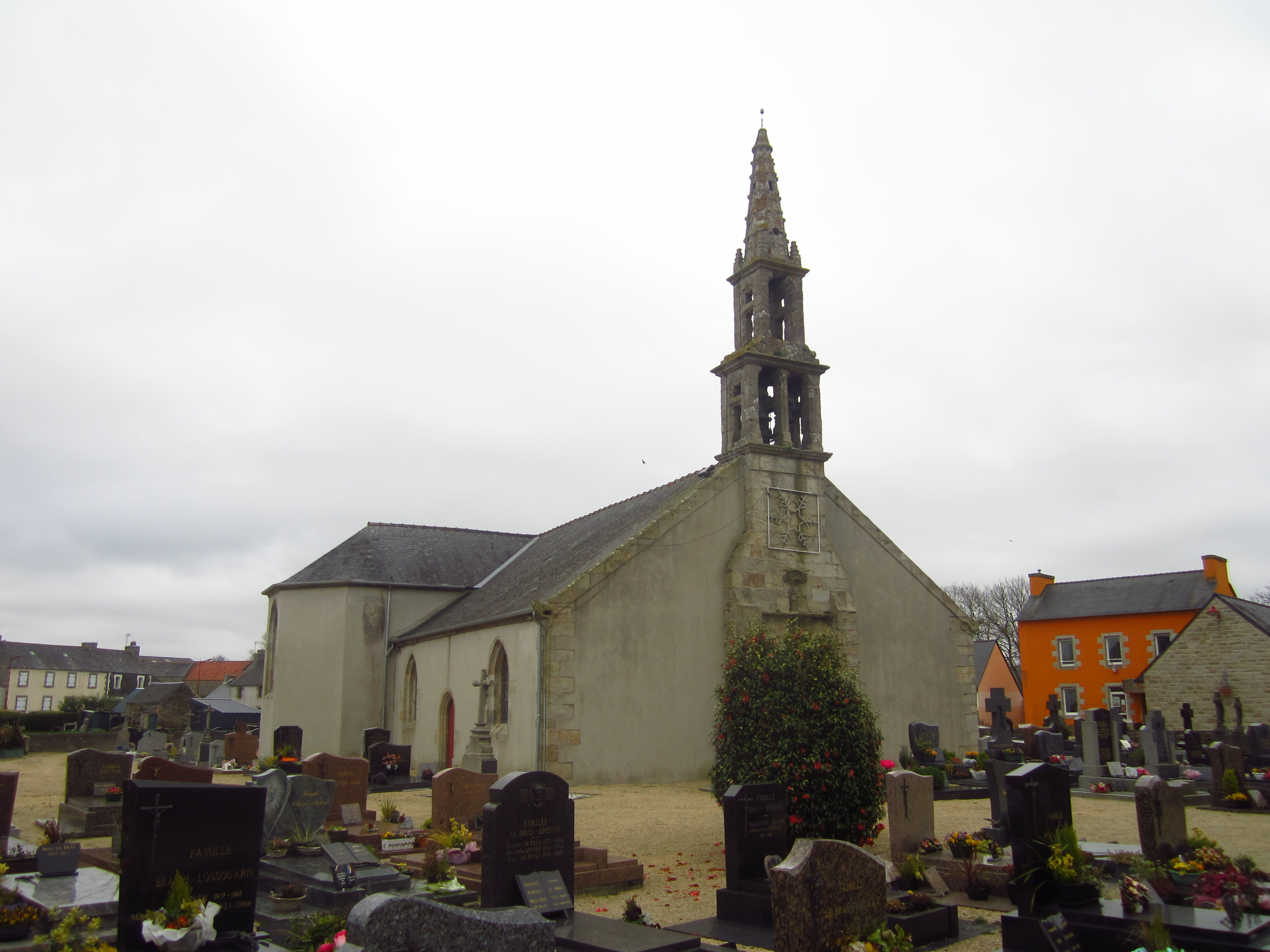
- The church in Saint-Derrien

- Coat of arms
- Location of Saint-Derrien
- Location within France Location within Brittany
- Coordinates: 48°32′58″N 4°10′47″W
- Country: France
- Region: Brittany
- Department: Finistère
- Arrondissement: Morlaix
- Canton: Landivisiau
- Intercommunality: Pays de Landivisiau

Government
  - Mayor (2020–2026): Dominique Pot
- Area^{1}: 12.28 km^{2} (4.74 sq mi)
- Highest elevation: 107 m (351 ft)
- Lowest elevation: 39 m (128 ft)
- Population (2023): 861
  - Density: 70.1/km^{2} (182/sq mi)
- Time zone: UTC+01:00 (CET)
  - Summer (DST): UTC+02:00 (CEST)
- INSEE/Postal code: 29244 /29440
- ^{1} French Land Register data, which excludes lakes, ponds, glaciers > 1 km^{2} (0.386 sq mi or 247 acres) and river estuaries.

Saint-Derrien (French pronunciation: [sɛ̃ dɛʁjɛ̃]; Breton: Sant-Derc'hen) is a commune in the Finistère department of Brittany in north-western France.

== See also ==
- Communes of the Finistère department
