= Château de Kérouzéré =

French castle

Coordinates: 48°40′21″N 4°4′11″W

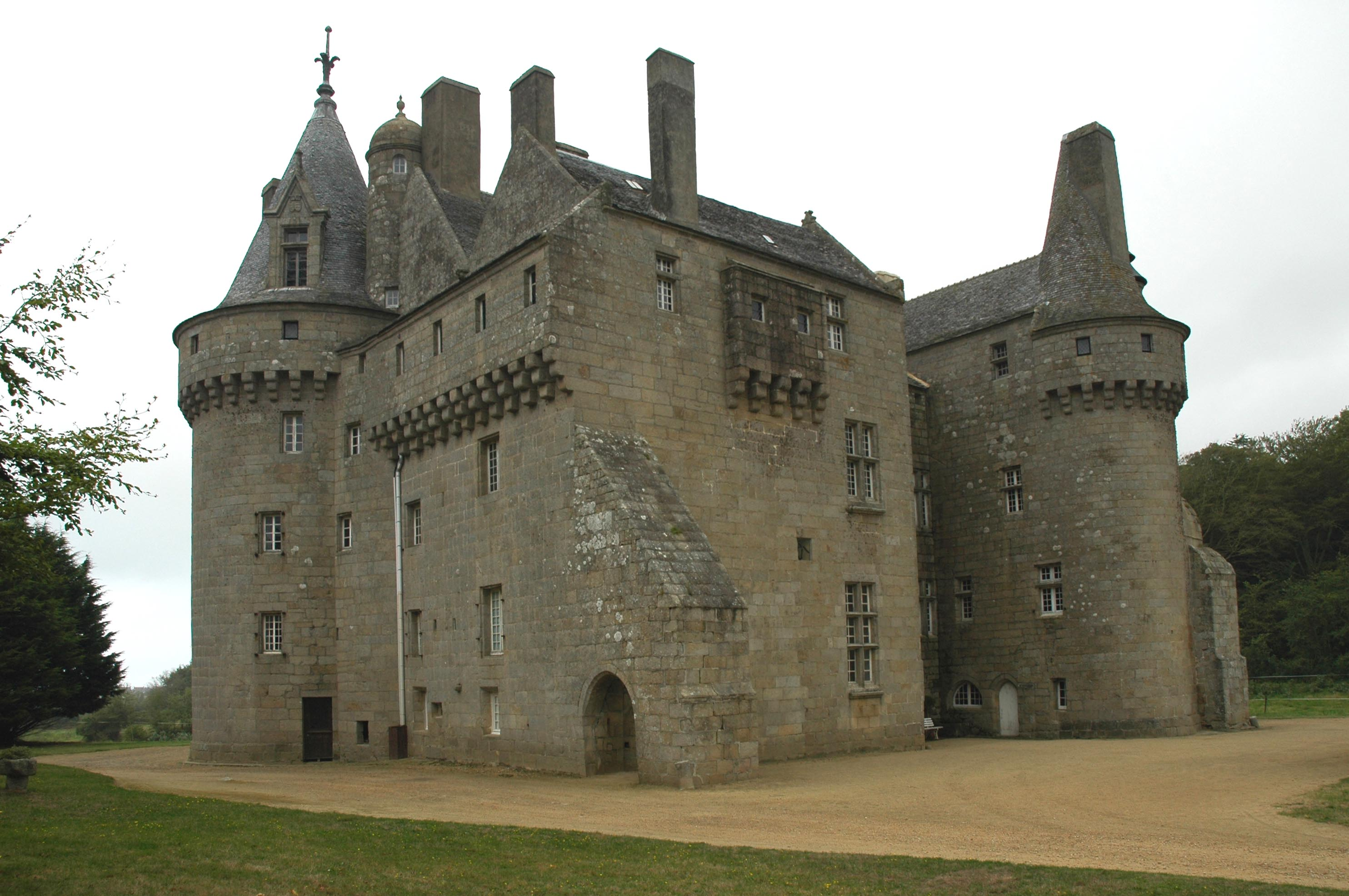
The castle of Kérouzéré, in Sibiril in Finistère (France)

The Château de Kérouzéré is a 15th-century Breton castle (or manor house) in the commune of Sibiril in the Finistère département of France.

== Background ==
The castle was built in granite in the first half of the 15th century for Jean and Yves de Kérouzéré, seneschal of Morlaix, and followers of the dukes of Brittany. Visible from the sea, Kérouzéré was dangerously exposed and was particularly vulnerable to English attacks. Therefore the duke permitted the owner to erect a single tower of more than twenty-four feet in width with crenellations and ditches. This construction caused a major controversy with the neighboring seigneur of Kermorvan. As a result, from 1466 the building was still unfinished and, in 1468, François II had to grant a second authorization for its completion. The original tower is the part of the manor house to the west of the current entry with the window of the chapel above it.

== Organization ==
It was besieged in 1590 during the French Wars of Religion and seriously damaged as the southeast tower was destroyed. It was rebuilt around 1600. There are four superimposed halls: the lowest hall is on the right of the entry and the uppermost hall, in the roof, gives access to the covered wall-walk. The kitchen, the common rooms and the private quarters above face west. There were originally four corner towers; the moat, of which vestiges remained until the last century, has been filled in. The interior of the manor house still has some 17th-century wall paintings. The roof of the northwest tower was restored at the end of the 19th century.

== Historic registry ==
It has been listed since 1883 as a monument historique by the French Ministry of Culture.

== Current site ==
Today visitors to the castle can still see the armory, chapel, stairs, wall-walk and the watchman's tower with a view over the sea. There is also a 15th-century dovecote still standing in the grounds.

== See also ==
- List of castles in France
