= Mylor =

Mylor may refer to:

- Mylor, Cornwall, a civil parish in Cornwall
  - Mylor Bridge, a village in Mylor parish
  - Mylor Churchtown, in Mylor parish
  - Mylor Creek, a tidal creek in Mylor parish
- Mylor, South Australia, a town and locality in Australia
- Saint Mylor
