= Trelew, Cornwall =

Hamlet in Cornwall, England

Coordinates: 50°10′41″N 5°03′54″W

Trelew
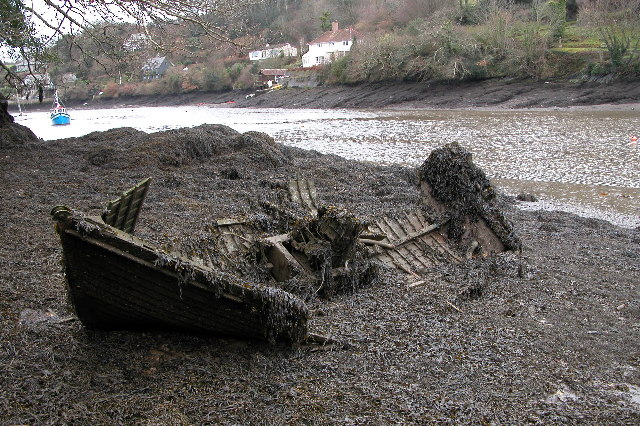
- Rotting boat, Mylor Creek, Trelew can be seen on the left

- Location within Cornwall
- Civil parish: Mylor
- Unitary authority: Cornwall
- Ceremonial county: Cornwall
- Region: South West
- Country: England
- Sovereign state: United Kingdom
- Police: Devon and Cornwall
- Fire: Cornwall
- Ambulance: South Western

Trelew is a hamlet in the civil parish of Mylor, in south west Cornwall in England, United Kingdom. The settlement is between the villages of Mylor Bridge and Mylor Churchtown 2 miles (3.2 km) north of Falmouth and two miles east of Penryn at grid reference SW 811 352. The hamlet is situated on the south shore of the tidal Mylor Creek, an inlet on the west side of Carrick Roads.

Trelew lies within the Cornwall Area of Outstanding Natural Beauty (AONB).

A fictionalised version of Trelew appears in the animated film Arthur Christmas (2011) as the hometown of the character Gwen.
