= Angarrick =

Hamlet in Cornwall, England

Coordinates: 50°11′46″N 5°05′20″W

Angarrick: Cornish: An Garrek
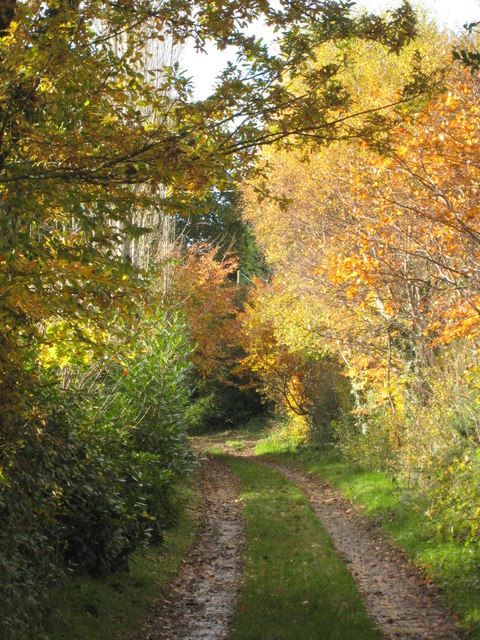
- A footpath at Angarrick

- Location within Cornwall
- Shire county: Cornwall
- Region: South West
- Country: England
- Sovereign state: United Kingdom
- Police: Devon and Cornwall
- Fire: Cornwall
- Ambulance: South Western

Angarrick (Cornish: An Garrek, meaning The Rock) is a hamlet in Cornwall, United Kingdom. It is situated three miles (5 km) north of Falmouth in the civil parish of Mylor. The hamlet is a mile north of Mylor Bridge on the hills above Restronguet Creek.
