= Trelew (disambiguation) =

Trelew is a city in Chubut Province, Argentina.

Trelew may also refer to:

- Trelew massacre, a retaliatory Argentine government killing of 16 militants in 1972
- Trelew, Cornwall, a hamlet in Cornwall, United Kingdom
- Trelew (band), a band based in Montevideo, Uruguay
- Omega Tower Trelew
- Racing de Trelew
