= Flushing, Cornwall =

Coordinates: 50.1651°N 5.0689°W

Flushing
- Location within the United Kingdom
- OS grid reference: SW811340
- Civil parish: Mylor
- Unitary authority: Cornwall
- Ceremonial county: Cornwall
- Region: South West
- Country: UK
- Sovereign state: United Kingdom
- Post town: FALMOUTH
- Postcode district: TR11
- Dialling code: 01326
- Police
- Fire
- Ambulance
- UK Parliament: Truro and Falmouth

Flushing is a coastal village in the civil parish of Mylor, west Cornwall, UK. It is 3 miles (5 km) east of Penryn and 10 miles (16 km) south of Truro. It faces Falmouth across the Penryn River, an arm of the Carrick Roads. The village is known for its yearly regatta.

Flushing lies within the Cornwall National Landscape (AONB). Almost a third of Cornwall has AONB designation, with the same status and protection as a National Park.

== History ==
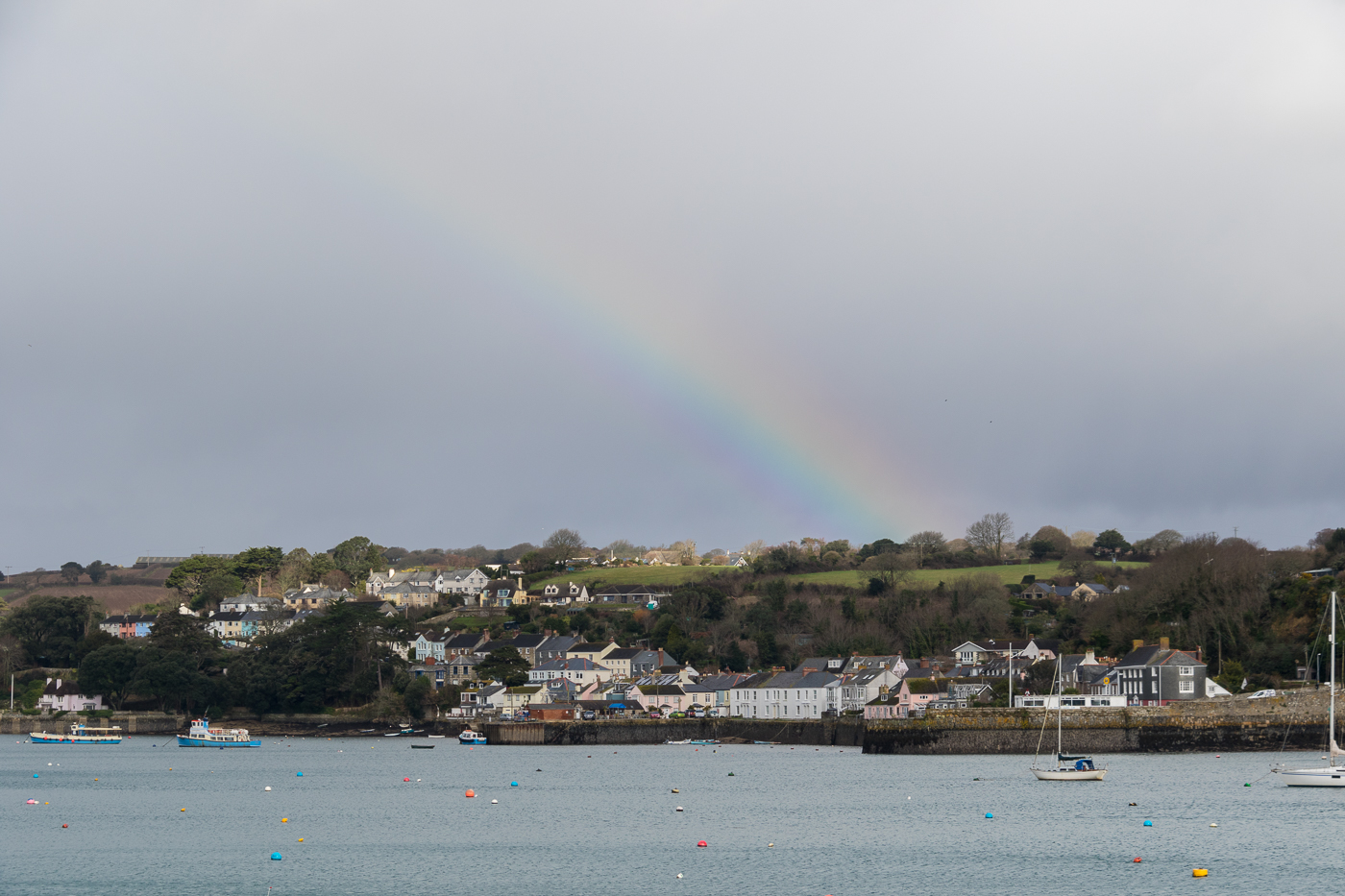

Henry VIII intended to build a castle on Trefusis Point, to accompany those built at Pendennis and St Mawes, but due to the expensive wars was unable to finance it.

The village was founded before 1653 (Calendar of State Papers Domestic Interregnum, 1653–1654 of proceedings on July 16, 1653). There is disagreement about whether there are any houses of the late 17th century extant. Nankersey, meaning valley of the reed swamp was, and continued to be, a separate dwelling on the road into the village of Flushing. The village was given its name by Dutch engineers, probably directed by Cornelius Vermuyden, who built the two main quays in the village. The grand houses on St Peter's Hill, the road that leads into the village, were owned by captains of the packet ships (mail-boats) that docked in nearby Falmouth.

James Silk Buckingham (1786–1855) spent his childhood here and writes that most of the packet captains and officers, and their families, as well as the crews, lived in the village. Dinners, balls and evening parties were held most evenings at some of the captains' houses and there were dances for the sailors at the more humble places. Much of it paid for by prize money and the profits from the contraband carried by the packet ships. (Note: The packet ships were not subject to searches by HM Customs and HM Excise, and therefore officers and crew were able to smuggle items for sale.)

In the 19th and 20th centuries, the village's economy mainly relied upon fishing, the two farms and former manors of Trefusis; the original seat of the Trefusis family, Barons Clinton since 1791 and Tregew, together with Falmouth Docks. Wheal Clinton lead mine started in 1854 and an engine shaft was sunk to 33 fathoms (198 ft; 60 m). There was not enough ore to make a profit and the mine was wound up in 1858. There was also briefly a copper mine on Jericho beach, but extracting the copper proved commercially unviable.

Flushing is principally a commuter village for the nearby towns of Penryn, Falmouth and Truro, although some commercial fishing vessels are still based in the village. There are also several B&Bs to cater for tourists; many houses in the village now lie unoccupied for most of the year as they are used as holiday homes.

== Housing and amenities ==
House on Trefusis Estate near Flushing Cornwall

Most of Flushing's 670 residents live in the centre of the village, on Coventry Road, Kersey Road and St Peter's Hill, although there is limited housing along Trefusis Road out as far as Kiln Beach, and there are also some houses near Trefusis Farm near the border with Mylor Bridge.

The doctor's surgery is located in the Village Hall. There are two pubs, the Royal Standard on St Peter's Hill and the formerly named Seven Stars, now “Harbour House” on Trefusis Road opposite Fish Cross. There is also a restaurant, Tide, on Ferry Quay.

== Churches and schools ==
Anglican church

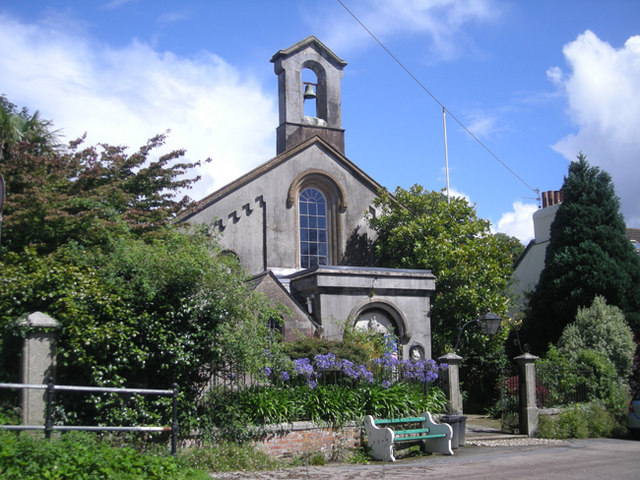
St Peter's Church, Flushing

Flushing's Church of England parish church is located on St Peter's Road and is dedicated to Saint Peter. It is built in the Norman style and was opened for divine worship in February 1842 (consecrated: August 1842). St Peter's was renovated in 1871 by subscriptions collected by Capt Nevill Norway RN, when a vestry was added. It is now a Grade II listed building. The parish is part of a united benefice with the parish of Mylor in the Archdeaconry of Cornwall and Diocese of Truro.

There is a Cornish cross in the churchyard. It was found in a farm building at Porloe in 1891 and moved to the churchyard. The head has a crude crucifixus figure on the front and a Latin cross on the back.

Methodist church

The Methodist chapel is located in Kersey Road and, built in 1816, is the oldest building in the Falmouth and Gwennap circuit. There was also a Bible Christian chapel in Kersey Road (built in 1833) and a Primitive Methodist chapel in Coventry Road (built in 1866).

In its 200th anniversary year (2016) the chapel was closed for public worship owing to declining membership. The chapel has now been declared as "purpose fulfilled" while community leaders – supported by the Methodist Circuit – seek a new use for the building. The chapel organ, lectern, gallery pulpit, baptismal fount, many smaller artefacts, two marble wall memorials, several brass memorial plates, some original 1816 seating and the entire contents of the Sunday School have all been preserved. Several original oil lamps from the 1866 Primitive Methodist Chapel in Coventry Road are also preserved. The Trustees gifted these objects, and a carved communion table with chairs from the demolished Pike's Hill Methodist chapel in Falmouth, to The Cornish Heritage Collection at Poldark Mine, 11 miles from Flushing, and they were moved there in 2016. The pipe organ is in working order and may be played by visitors.

Schools

The village Church of England school is in Coventry Road and caters for a maximum of eighty pupils. It serves as a feeder school for the local secondary school, Penryn College, although some pupils have gone on to Penair School in Truro or the fee-paying Truro School and Truro High School for Girls. Due to its cramped location in the middle of the village it has no playing field or school hall; organised games are held on the Bowling Green at the top of the village, and school meals and plays take place in the Village Hall on Coventry Road.

== Culture ==
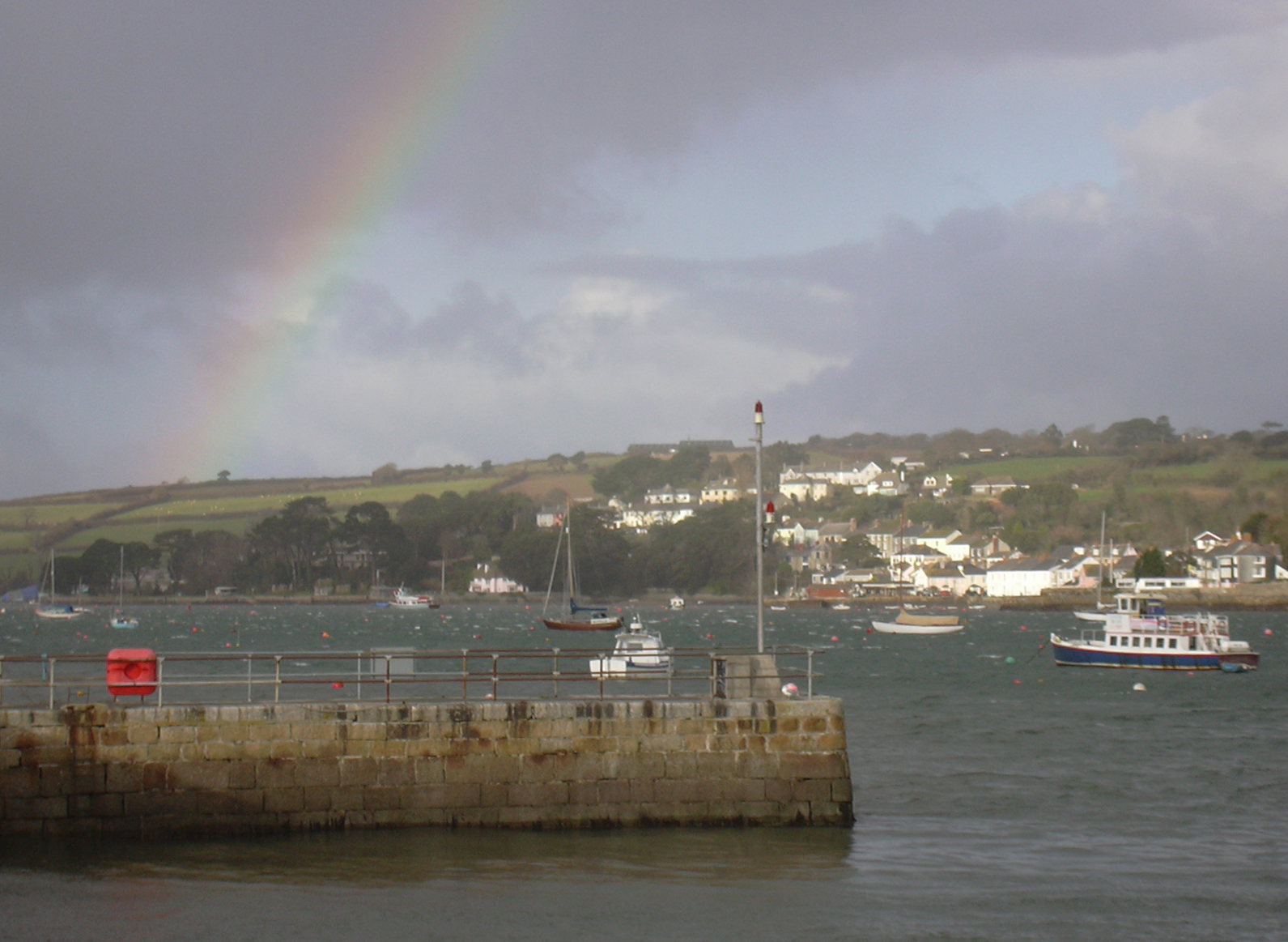
Flushing harbour from Fish Strand Quay, Falmouth

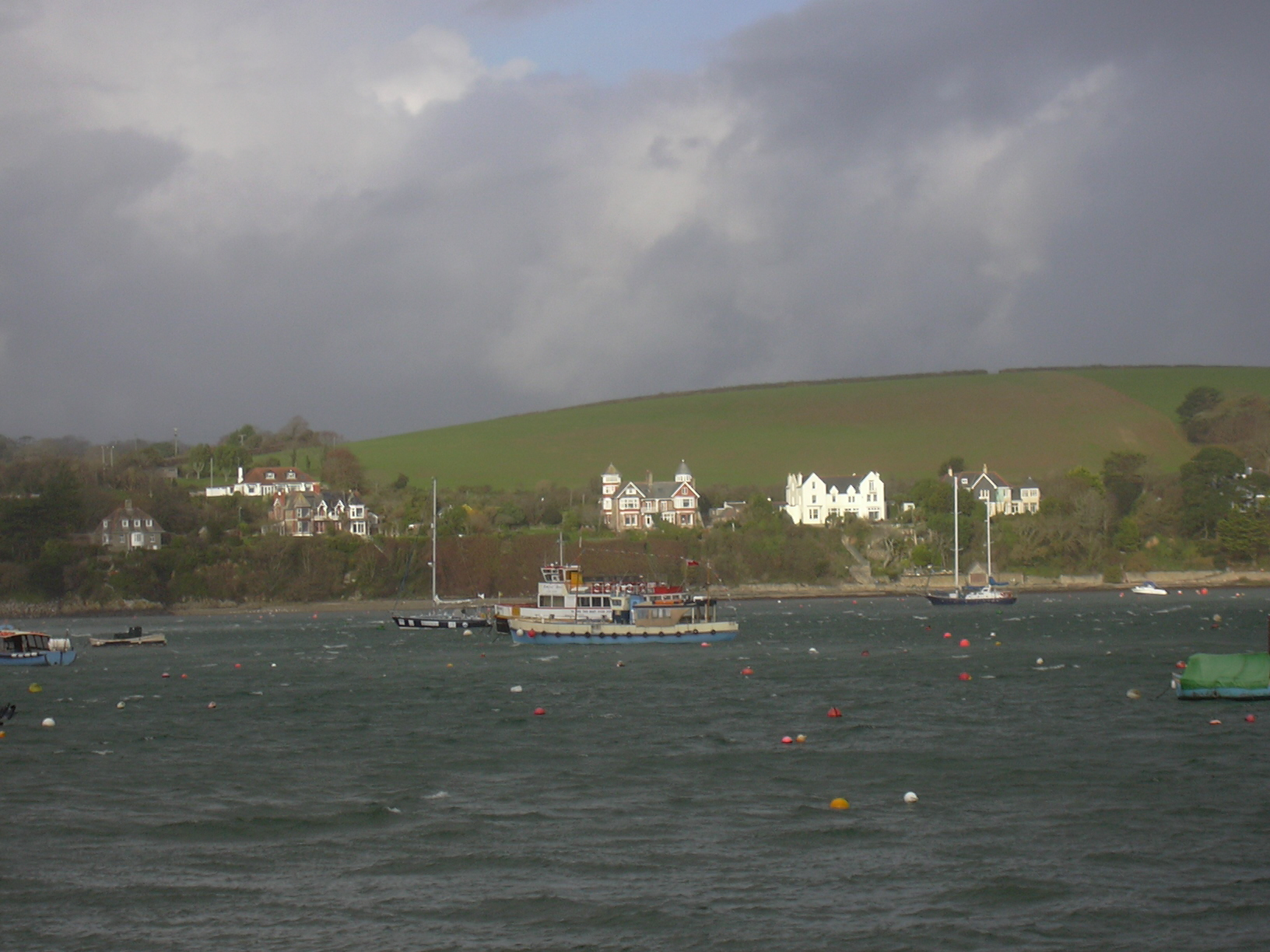
Houses in Flushing, from Fish Strand Quay, Falmouth

The Flushing Sailing Club celebrated its centenary in July 2021, with a visit from the Princess Royal, in her role as President of the Royal Yachting Association.

Flushing Regatta Week is held annually during late July or early August, and features water-based activities such as bathtub racing, rowing, swimming and sailing races, sand-castle building contests, a mini-marathon through Mylor and Flushing, an open-air church service, a pub quiz, crab catching, and a carnival on Saturday night, and has achieved marked popularity locally. Every year, two residents of Flushing who have contributed to the life of the village over a period of time are selected to be the Presidents; their responsibilities include judging competitions and opening events.

The Nankersey Male Choir perform regular concerts throughout the year, raising money for local causes, and classical concerts and recitals are often held in the Methodist chapel. The village has two gig clubs, Nankersey Rowing Club and Flushing & Mylor Pilot Gig Club.

Due to its position, Flushing is said to be one of the warmest villages in the United Kingdom. The beaches at Kiln are extremely popular in the summer months, particularly with tourists, offering superb views of Falmouth Docks, the Carrick Roads and St Anthony's Head. There is also another beach further around the coast known as Jericho, which is only accessible from the houses directly above the beach or by rowing boat, and is therefore popular with locals.

=== Cornish wrestling ===
Cornish wrestling tournaments, for prizes, were held in Flushing in the 1800s.

== Notable people ==
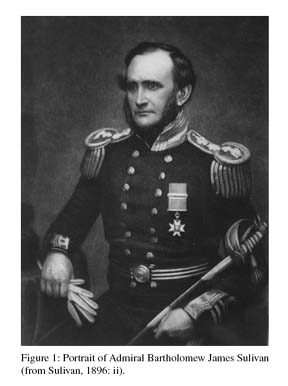
Bartholomew Sulivan, 1896

- James Silk Buckingham (1786–1855), author, politician and social reformer.
- George Pellew (1793–1866), churchman and theologian, Dean of Norwich, 1828 to 1866.
- Admiral Sir Bartholomew Sulivan (1810–1890), a British naval officer and hydrographer, like many colleagues maintained a house there. Friend and shipmate of Charles Darwin on the historic voyage of HMS Beagle, eponymn of Bartolomé Island.
- Harrison Hayter (1825–1898), engineer, took part in railway construction projects and many harbour and dock constructions
- Ethel Charles (1871–1962), and Bessie Charles (1869–1932), architect sisters, the first women members of the Royal Institute of British Architects, set up a practice at Clift Cottage in Flushing. Their most notable work was a Bible Christian Chapel at Mylor Bridge (1907).
- Donald Prell (1924–2020), an American futurist, lived there for a number of years
- Morwenna Banks, actress, comedian, writer and producer.
