= Bessie Charles =

British architect

Bessie Ada Charles
- Born: 1869; Calcutta, India
- Died: 4 November 1932 (aged 62–63)
- Education: Somerville College, Oxford; The Bartlett, UCL
- Occupation: Architect
- Parents: Thomas Edmonton Charles (father); Ada Henrietta Charles (mother)
- Relatives: Ethel Charles (sister); Ronald Charles (brother)

Bessie Ada Charles (1869 – 4 November 1932) was a British architect. In 1900, she became one of the first women to enter the Royal Institute of British Architects (RIBA).

== Early life ==
Bessie Charles, her sister Ethel Charles and brother Ronald Charles were born in Calcutta to Thomas Edmonton Charles (1834–1906), a doctor in private practice (also later honorary physician to King Edward VII), and Ada Henrietta Charles (1848–1931/2).

The family left India in 1877, settling at first in Cannes, then for twenty years spent their summers in Switzerland and winters in Rome, and visiting to England annually. Ethel and Bessie Charles were both educated privately and together read modern languages at Somerville College, Oxford for a year in 1891–2.

Despite being presented at court, their father encouraged both daughters to explore a profession.

== Career ==
Between 1892 and 1895, Bessie and Ethel were articled to Sir Ernest George and Peto, the architectural practice of Ernest George and Harold Peto. In 1892 they were proposed for membership of the Architectural Association School of Architecture, but withdrew after opposition. They attended the school of architecture at The Bartlett (University College London), studying architecture as a fine art, a course in architectural history (second class certificates, 1892–3); however, they did not take the professional elements of the programme, which were not thought appropriate for women students. They were the first women to study architecture at UCL. In 1900, Bessie took the qualifying examination for the Royal Institute of British Architects (RIBA) and was elected, one year after Ethel.

From 1898 to 1905 Ethel and Bessie Charles lived together in Marylebone, London, in a building which provided accommodation for single professional women. Both sisters lived from time to time in the family home in Camberley, Surrey, but they shifted the focus of their architectural practice to Clift Cottage in Flushing, Cornwall. Their most notable work is a Bible Christian Chapel at Mylor Bridge, near Falmouth (1907).

== See also ==
- Women in architecture
