= Ethel Charles =

British architect

Ethel Mary Charles
- Born: 25 March 1871; Calcutta, British India
- Died: 8 April 1962 (aged 93); Haverthwaite, England
- Education: Somerville College, Oxford; The Bartlett, UCL
- Occupation: Architect
- Parents: Thomas Edmonton Charles (father); Ada Henrietta Charles (mother)
- Relatives: Bessie Charles (sister); Ronald Charles (brother)

Ethel Mary Charles (25 March 1871 – 8 April 1962) was a British architect, the first woman to be admitted to the Royal Institute of British Architects (RIBA) in 1898.

== Early life ==
Ethel Charles, her sister Bessie Ada Charles (1869–1932) and brother Ronald Charles (1875-1955) were born in Calcutta, Bengal India, to Thomas Edmonton Charles (1834–1906), a medical doctor in private practice (also later honorary physician to King Edward VII), and Ada Henrietta Charles (1848–1931/2).

The family left India in 1877, settling at first in Cannes, then for twenty years spent their summers in Switzerland and winters in Rome, and visiting to England annually. Ethel and Bessie Charles were both educated privately and together read modern languages at Somerville College, Oxford for a year in 1891–2.

Despite being presented at court, their father encouraged both daughters to explore a profession.

== Career ==
Between 1892 and 1895 Ethel and Bessie were articled to Sir Ernest George and Peto, the architectural practice of Ernest George and Harold Peto. In 1893, they both attempted to continue their training by attending the Architectural Association School of Architecture but were refused entry. Ethel completed part of the course offered by the Bartlett School of Architecture, receiving distinctions.

Drawings in the RIBA Collection document her travels through England, France and Italy. After her apprenticeship with Ernest George, she became an assistant to Walter Cave, studying Gothic and domestic architecture.

In June 1898, she passed the RIBA examinations for associate membership. RIBA President at the time, Professor George Aitchison, welcomed Ethel but her admission was opposed by a minority of members, including W. Hilton Nash who stated "it would be prejudicial to the interests of the Institute to elect a lady member". Despite this initial opposition, she was finally granted membership with 51 voting in favor and 16 against. In 1902 she made a representation to the Architectural Association for women to be accepted as practicing architects. However, the Association would not admit any women until 1917.

In 1904, Ethel Charles was awarded the RIBA Silver Medal for her essay ‘The development of architectural art from structural requirements and nature of materials’, which examined relationships between design, materials, and construction methods in a range of architectural styles.

From 1898 to 1905 Ethel and Bessie Charles lived and worked together in Marylebone, London, which provided accommodation for single professional women. Both sisters lived from time to time in the family home in Camberley, Surrey, but later shifted the focus of their architectural practice to Clift Cottage in Flushing, Cornwall. Unable to obtain commissions for large-scale projects which continued to be reserved for men, Ethel Charles was forced to concentrate on modest housing projects such as labourers' cottages, often working with her sister, the second woman to become a member of RIBA. Their most notable work is a Bible Christian Chapel at Mylor Bridge, near Falmouth (1907). They also designed houses on Gyllyngyvase Terrace in Falmouth (1907).

Ethel Charles' orthographic projections of labourers' cottages from 1895 are presented by RIBA as an example of how the Old English style began to evolve towards the Arts and Crafts and Garden City movements. In 1905, she designed three labourers' cottages for Letchworth Garden City.

Charles stated publicly that the best opportunities for architects were in commercial commissions but the only reference to her work on large-scale designs is an untraced prize-winning church in Germany in 1909.

== Post World War One ==
After the First World War, Charles does not appear to have practiced but kept house for her younger brother, army officer Ronald, who was for a time commandant of the Royal Military Academy, Woolwich (1924-1926).

Ethel Charles died on 8 April 1962 in Haverthwaite, Lancashire. She was cremated and her ashes were interred alongside her sister Bessie who had predeceased her in 1932.

== Commemoration ==
Charles left her architectural drawings and sketchbooks to RIBA, which celebrated her as a pioneer woman architect in 2017.

== See also ==
- Women in architecture
