= Miliau =

Breton saint and eponym of the village of Guimiliau

Saint Miliau
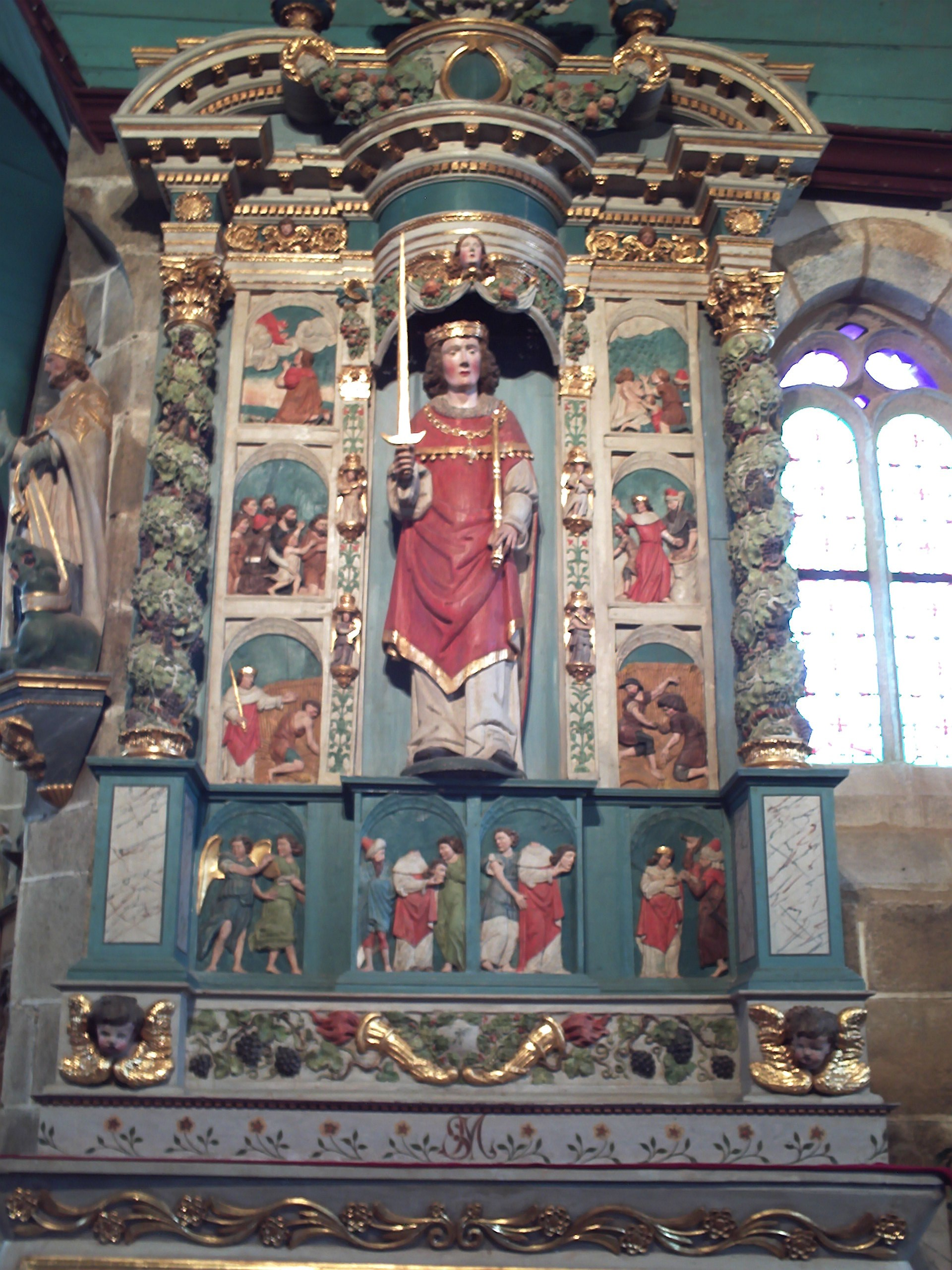
- Retable of St Miliau at Guimiliau, showing a polychrome statue of the saint, surrounded by scenes from his life and martyrdom. The lower panels show him holding his own severed head.

Martyr
- Born: Brittany
- Died: 6th century? Brittany
- Venerated in: Roman Catholic Church
- Major shrine: Guimiliau, Brittany
- Feast: 24 July
- Attributes: depicted as a cephalophore; in royal garb
- Patronage: against rheumatism

St Miliau or Miliav is a Breton saint and eponym of the village of Guimiliau, where he is particularly venerated. He is said to be a good saint to invoke in cases of rheumatism. St Miliau is a figure of some importance in Breton cult and legend. He is sometimes represented as a cephalophore, i.e. holding his own severed head. It is hard to be sure what historical core there might be to the legends.

== Legend ==
The legend of St Miliau, as retold in Brittany, pictures him as a good and just prince, slain by his evil brother. Miliau was the son of Budic and grandson of Alain le Long, kings of Armorica in Brittany. His brothers were Theodoric and Rivod. Baring-Gould says Miliau may have had his residence at Plonévez-Porzay near Quimper. After the death of Budic, Miliau held the chiefdom of Léon. For seven years no rain nor snow fell, but the land still yielded an abundance.

Miliau is said to have married Haurille, a woman from Domnonia; their son was St Melar. Miliau was famous as a protector and benefactor of the poor, and is represented as dividing his cloak with a beggar, like St Martin of Tours. When he succeeded to the throne, Rivod had him assassinated by decapitation, around 531. A few years later, Rivod eliminated Melar in the same way.

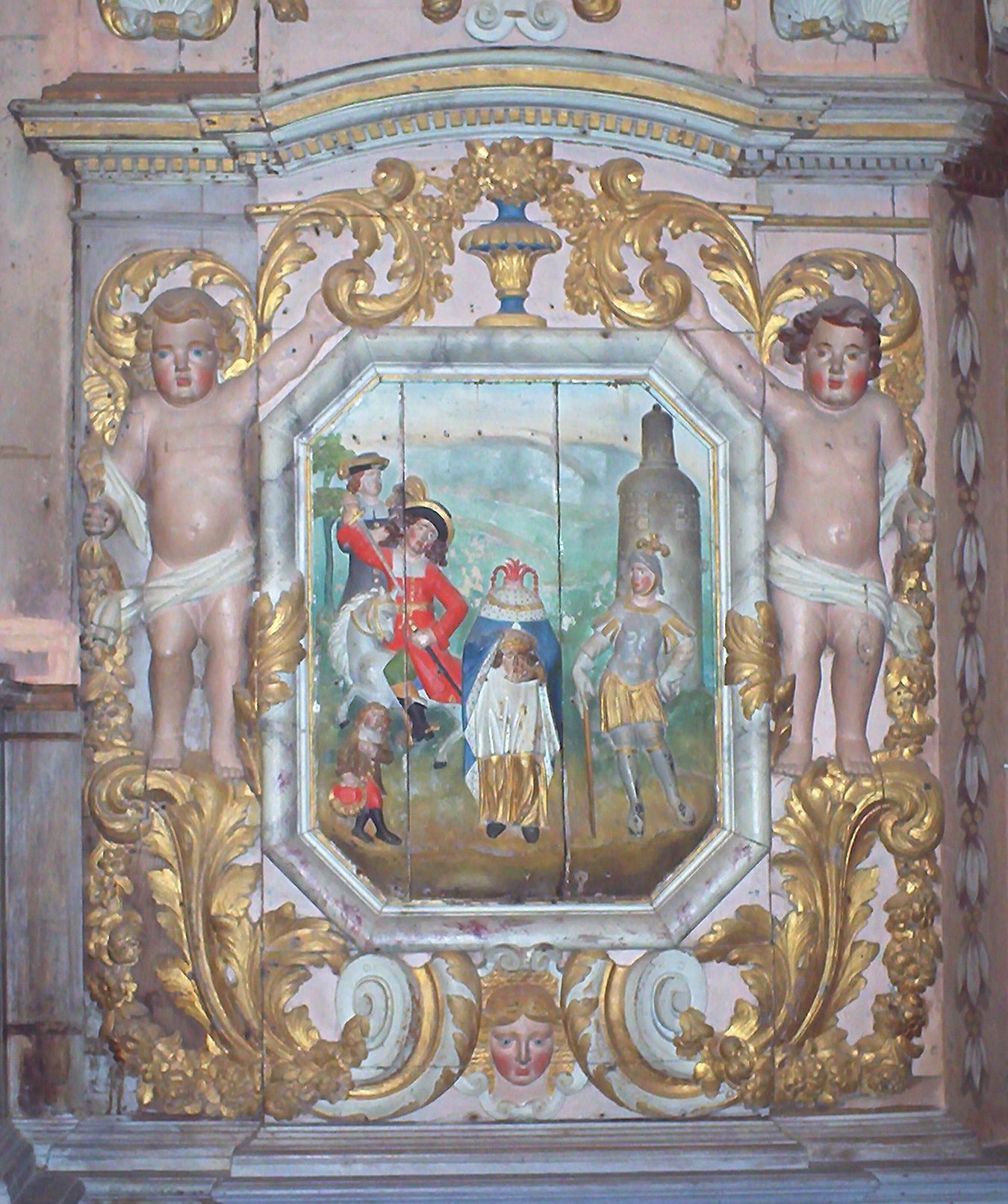
Detail from the Retable of the Passion at Lampaul-Guimiliau, showing the martyrdom of St Miliau. Blood gushes from his neck as he holds his severed head.

However, the historical Alan I, King of Brittany, flourished in the 9th century and died in 907. He really did have a son called Budic, who did not succeed him as king. The date 892 is sometimes given for the martyrdom of St Miliau, making him a contemporary of the Carolingian emperors, rather than the early Merovingian kings. This seems a better fit with the alleged ancestry of St Miliau, and it is reasonable to suppose that Budic might have had two sons who quarrelled over their ranking within the kingdom. This dating separates Miliau from St Melar by more than three centuries. On the other hand, the paternity, and even the geographical origins, of Melar are disputed, and it is possible that the connection between the two is based on a misunderstanding.

A further confusing factor is that St Hervé, whose date of death (as an old man) is generally given as 556, is also regarded as a native of Guimiliau. Even the earlier dating for Miliau would make it improbable that Hervé was born in a village of that name, though it would not exclude the possibility that he was born in that locality sometime before Miliau.

Miliau is the patron saint of Trébeurden.
