= Tregew =

Hamlet in Cornwall, England

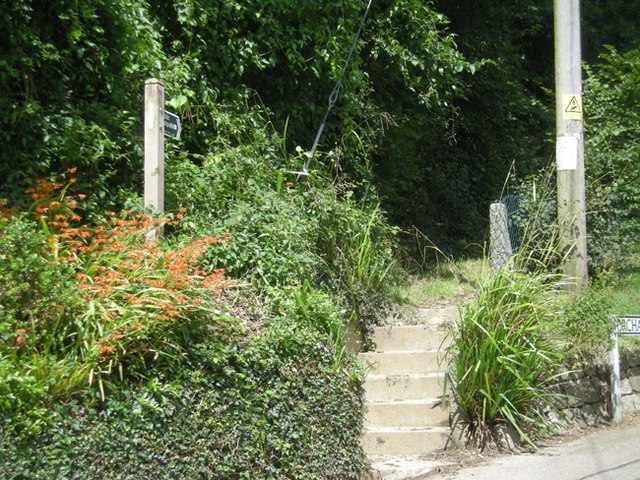
Footpath to Tregew

Tregew is a hamlet north of Flushing, Cornwall, England, United Kingdom.

Bartholomew Sulivan, the naval officer and hydrographer, was born here in 1810.
