= Guimiliau =

Guimiliau Gwimilio
- Commune
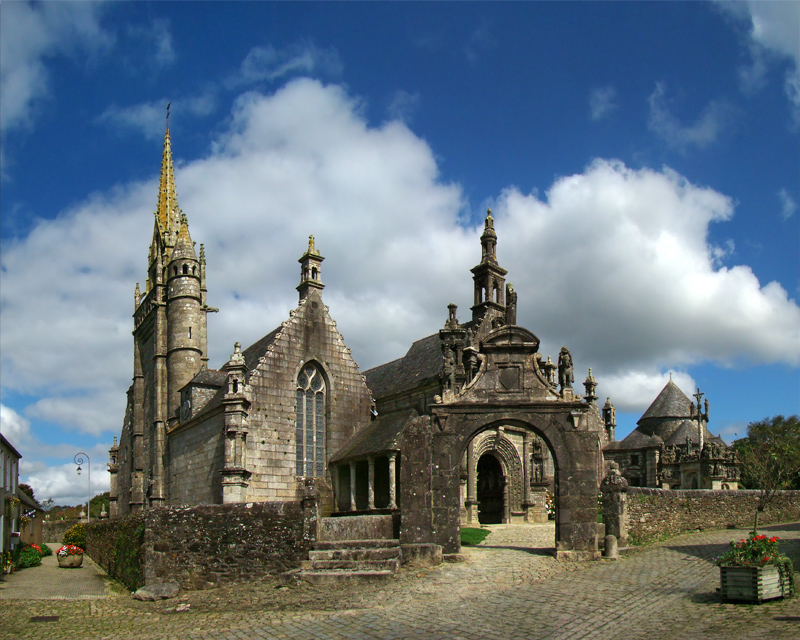
- Parish close

- Coat of arms
- Location of Guimiliau
- Location within France Location within Brittany
- Coordinates: 48°29′19″N 3°59′45″W
- Country: France
- Region: Brittany
- Department: Finistère
- Arrondissement: Morlaix
- Canton: Landivisiau
- Intercommunality: Pays de Landivisiau

Government
  - Mayor (2020–2026): Elisabeth Guillerm
- Area^{1}: 11.22 km^{2} (4.33 sq mi)
- Highest elevation: 159 m (522 ft)
- Lowest elevation: 63 m (207 ft)
- Population (2023): 994
  - Density: 88.6/km^{2} (229/sq mi)
- Time zone: UTC+01:00 (CET)
  - Summer (DST): UTC+02:00 (CEST)
- INSEE/Postal code: 29074 /29400
- ^{1} French Land Register data, which excludes lakes, ponds, glaciers > 1 km^{2} (0.386 sq mi or 247 acres) and river estuaries.

Guimiliau (French pronunciation: [ɡimiljo]; Breton: Gwimilio) is a commune in the Finistère department of Brittany in north-western France.

It is noted for the Guimiliau Parish close. It should not be confused with the neighbouring commune and village of Lampaul-Guimiliau.

== Population ==
Inhabitants of Guimiliau are called in French Guimiliens.

Historical population

Year	Pop.	±% p.a.
1793	1,841	—
1800	1,557	−2.37%
1806	1,328	−2.62%
1821	1,397	+0.34%
1831	1,464	+0.47%
1836	1,495	+0.42%
1841	1,590	+1.24%
1846	1,596	+0.08%
1851	1,530	−0.84%
1856	1,497	−0.44%
1861	1,625	+1.65%
1866	1,625	+0.00%
1872	1,521	−1.10%
1876	1,523	+0.03%
1881	1,526	+0.04%
1886	1,511	−0.20%
1891	1,584	+0.95%
1896	1,562	−0.28%
1901	1,516	−0.60%

Year	Pop.	±% p.a.
1906	1,453	−0.85%
1911	1,461	+0.11%
1921	1,275	−1.35%
1926	1,156	−1.94%
1931	1,043	−2.04%
1936	949	−1.87%
1946	988	+0.40%
1954	817	−2.35%
1962	786	−0.48%
1968	756	−0.65%
1975	700	−1.09%
1982	760	+1.18%
1990	791	+0.50%
1999	814	+0.32%
2007	933	+1.72%
2012	1,028	+1.96%
2017	1,009	−0.37%
2023	994	−0.25%

Source: EHESS and INSEE (1968-2023)

== Local Saints ==
Guimiliau, or Gwimilio in Breton, is named after St Miliau. The name simply means town or settlement (Breton: gwic) of Milio. According to legend, Miliau was a good and just Breton prince, put to death in a dynastic quarrel in the 6th or 9th century.

Guimiliau is also famous as the reputed birthplace of St Hervé, a 6th-century ascetic, who is one of the most popular Breton saints.

== Parish close ==
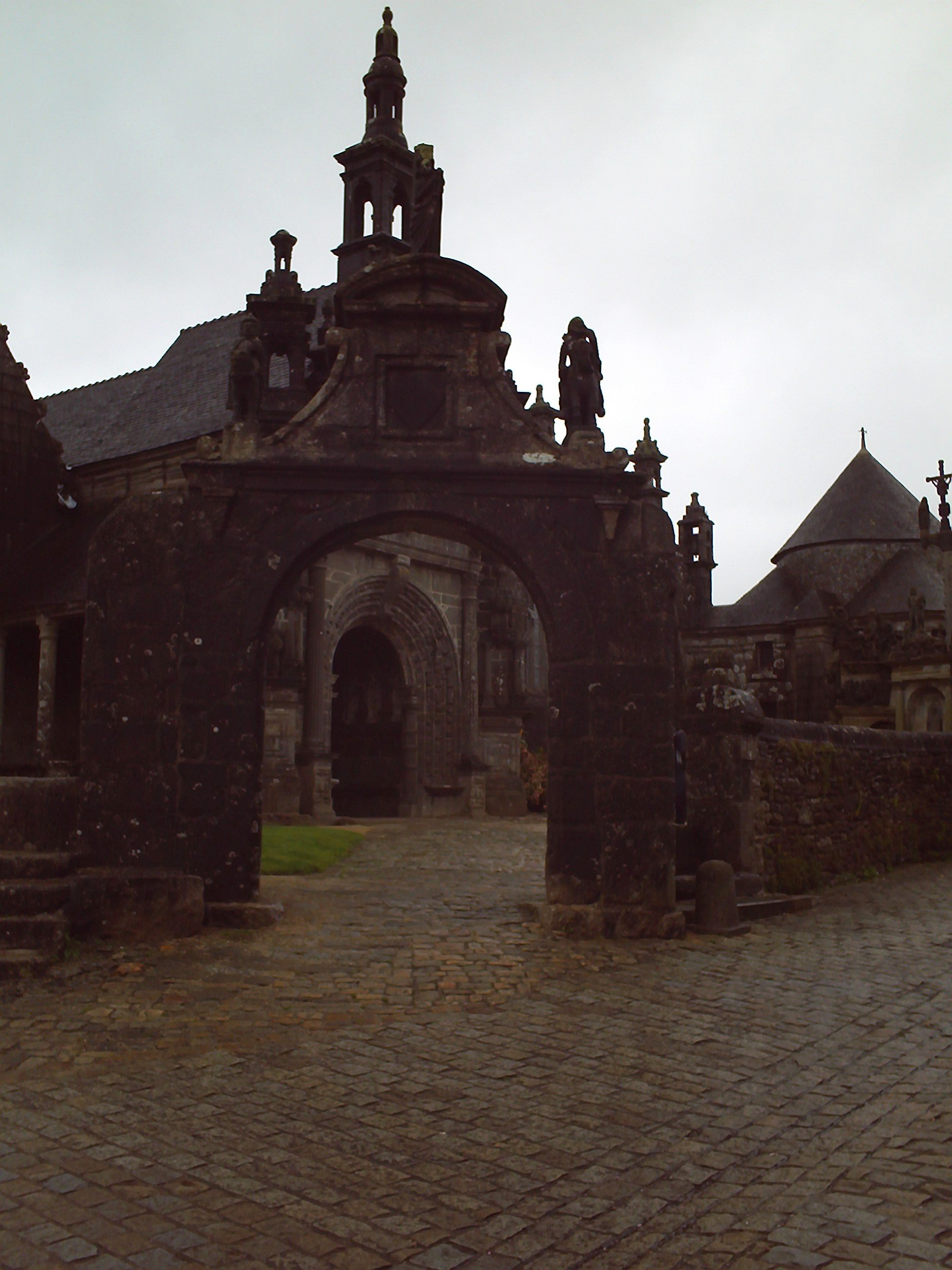
Entrance to the parish close, showing the enclosing wall and gateway.

Parish closes are a distinctive feature of Breton culture in the historic Léon diocese, in which Guimiliau stands. As the name suggests, a close is a completely enclosed church yard, usually with a commanding entrance arch. Sacred enclosures were a feature of Celtic religion even before the arrival of Christianity. Parish closes today form the foci for pardons, the annual Breton pilgrimage festivals, which can attract thousands of worshippers.

The parish close of Guimiliau is situated at the upper end of the main village street, with the entrance dominating the village.

The calvary or crucifix is the centre piece of the church yard, surrounded by a fine and complex retelling of the Passion in statuary. See Calvary at Guimiliau

The church contains many fine examples of polychrome sculpture from the sixteenth century onwards, including several large retables. There is also a fine octagonal baptistery, a carved pulpit and a collection of banners used especially in religious processions at pardons.

== Gallery ==
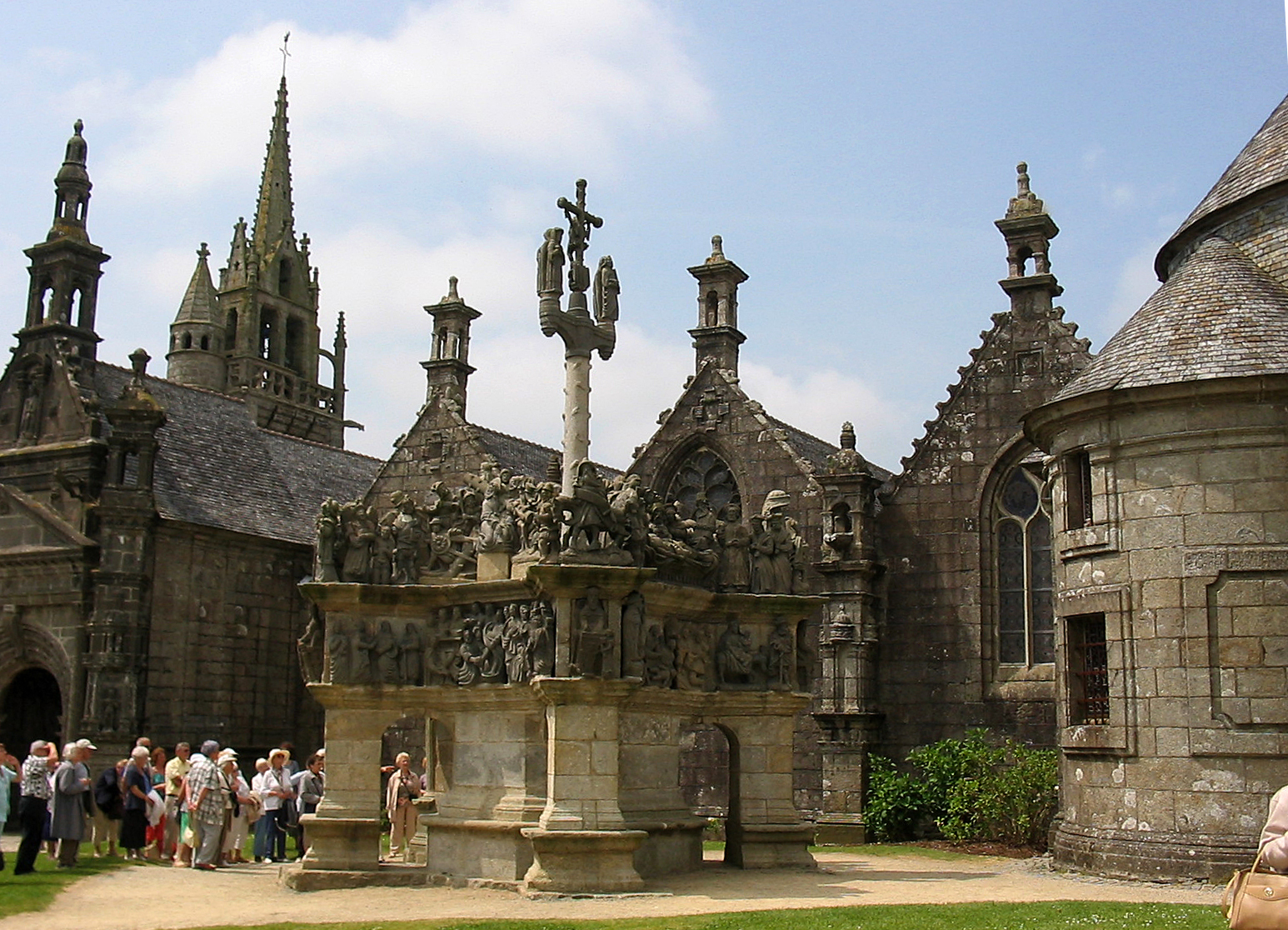
Church and Calvary.

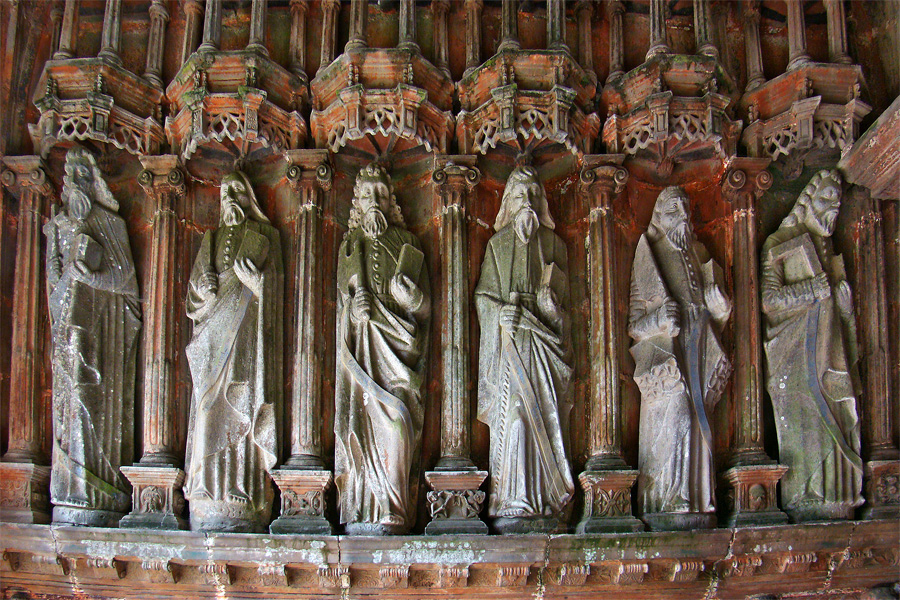
Porch left side.

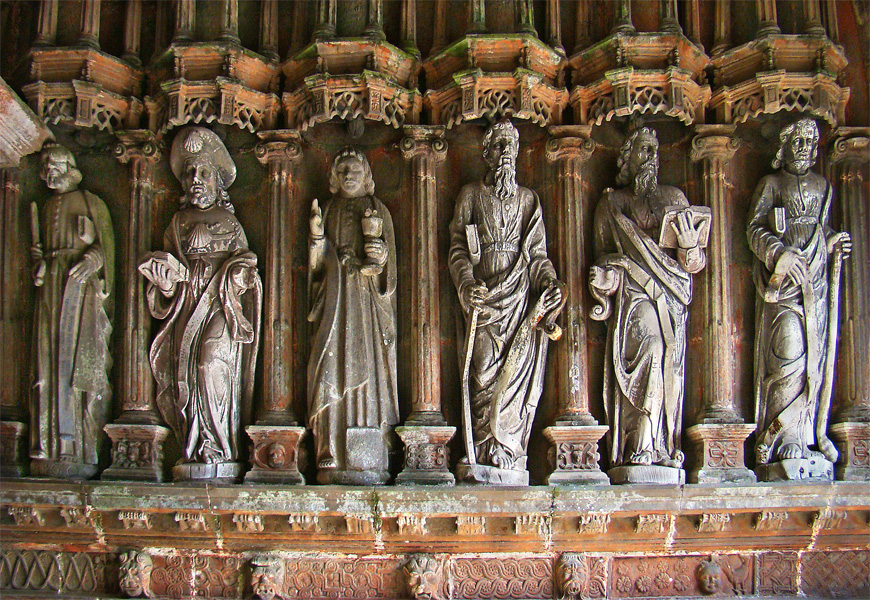
Porch right side.

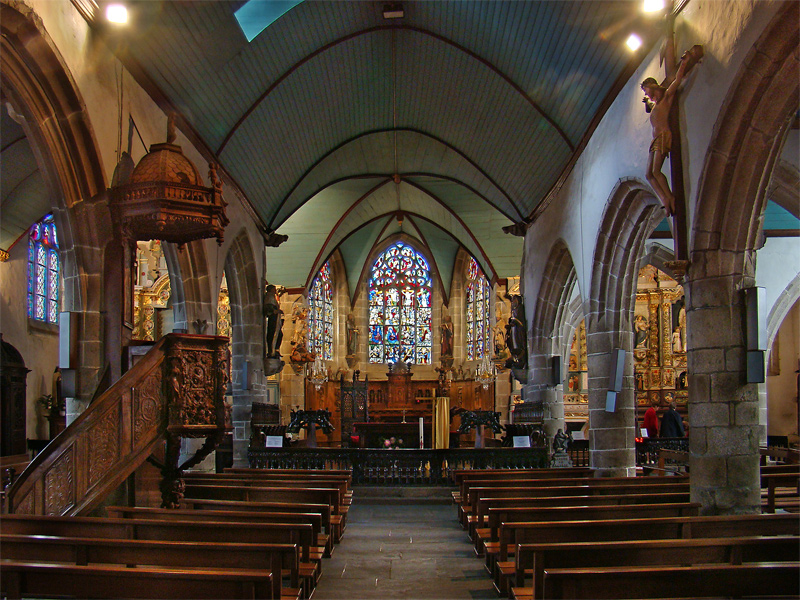
Nave and choir.

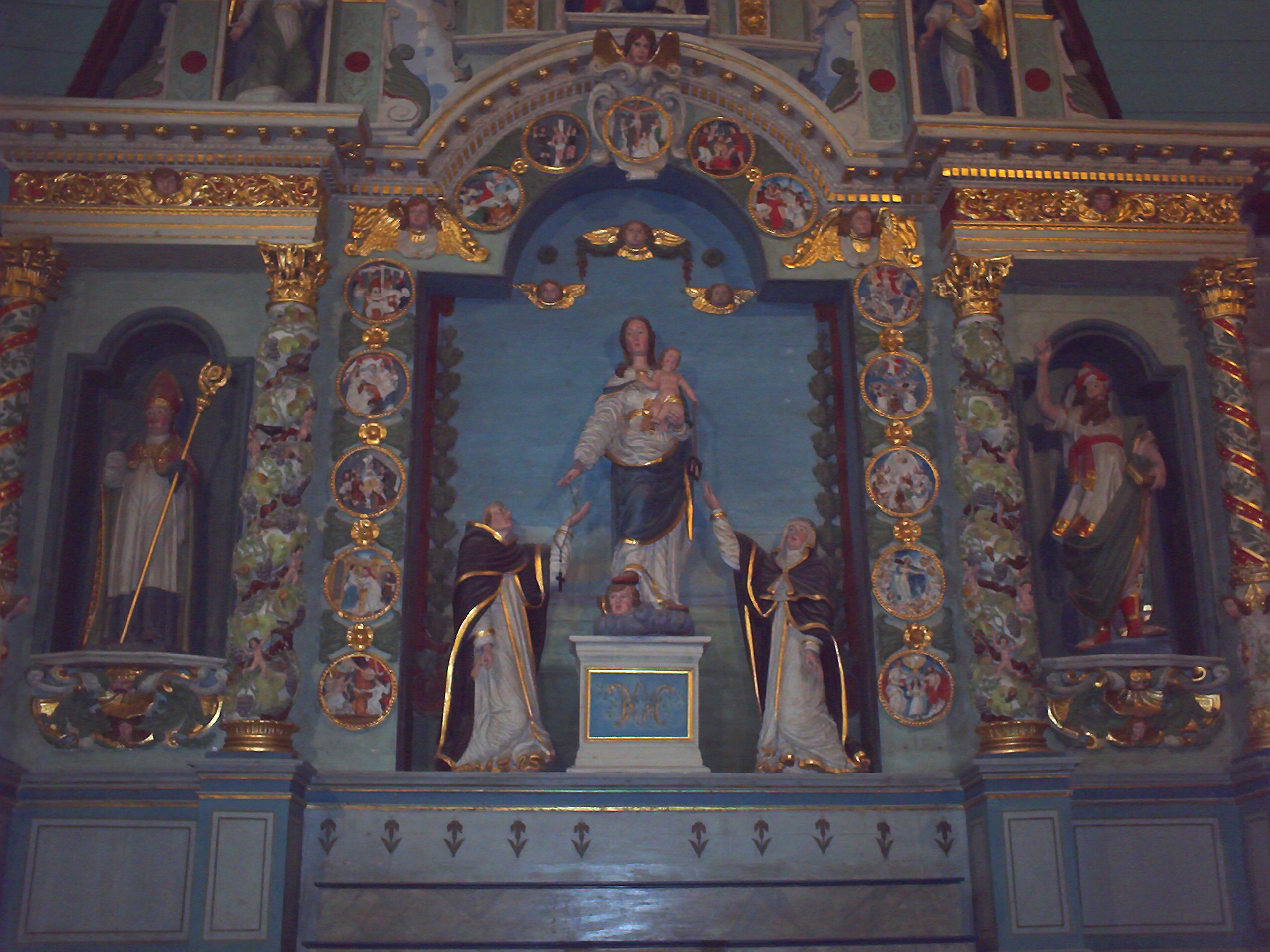
Detail from Retable of the Rosary.

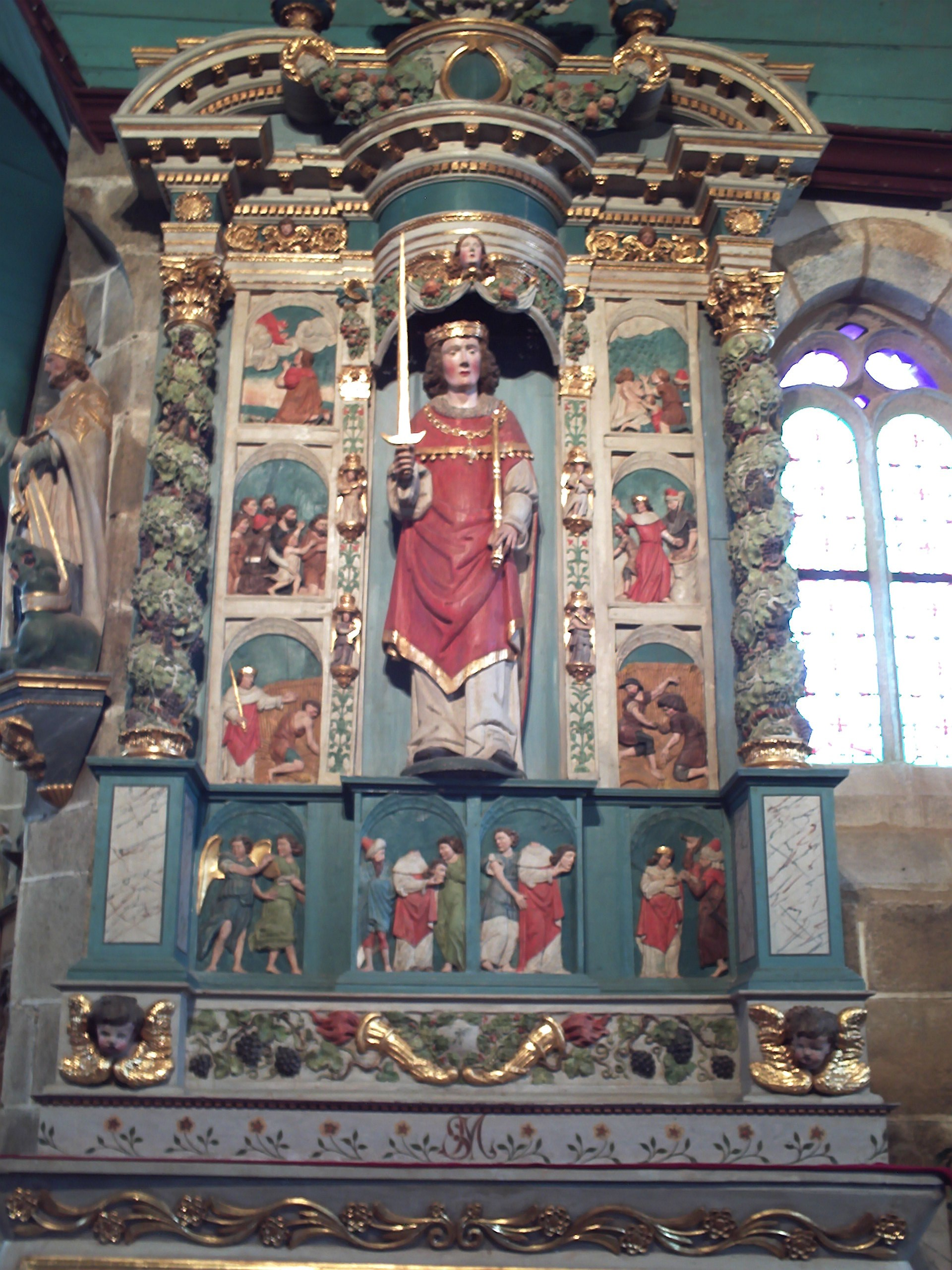
Detail from Retable of St Miliau.

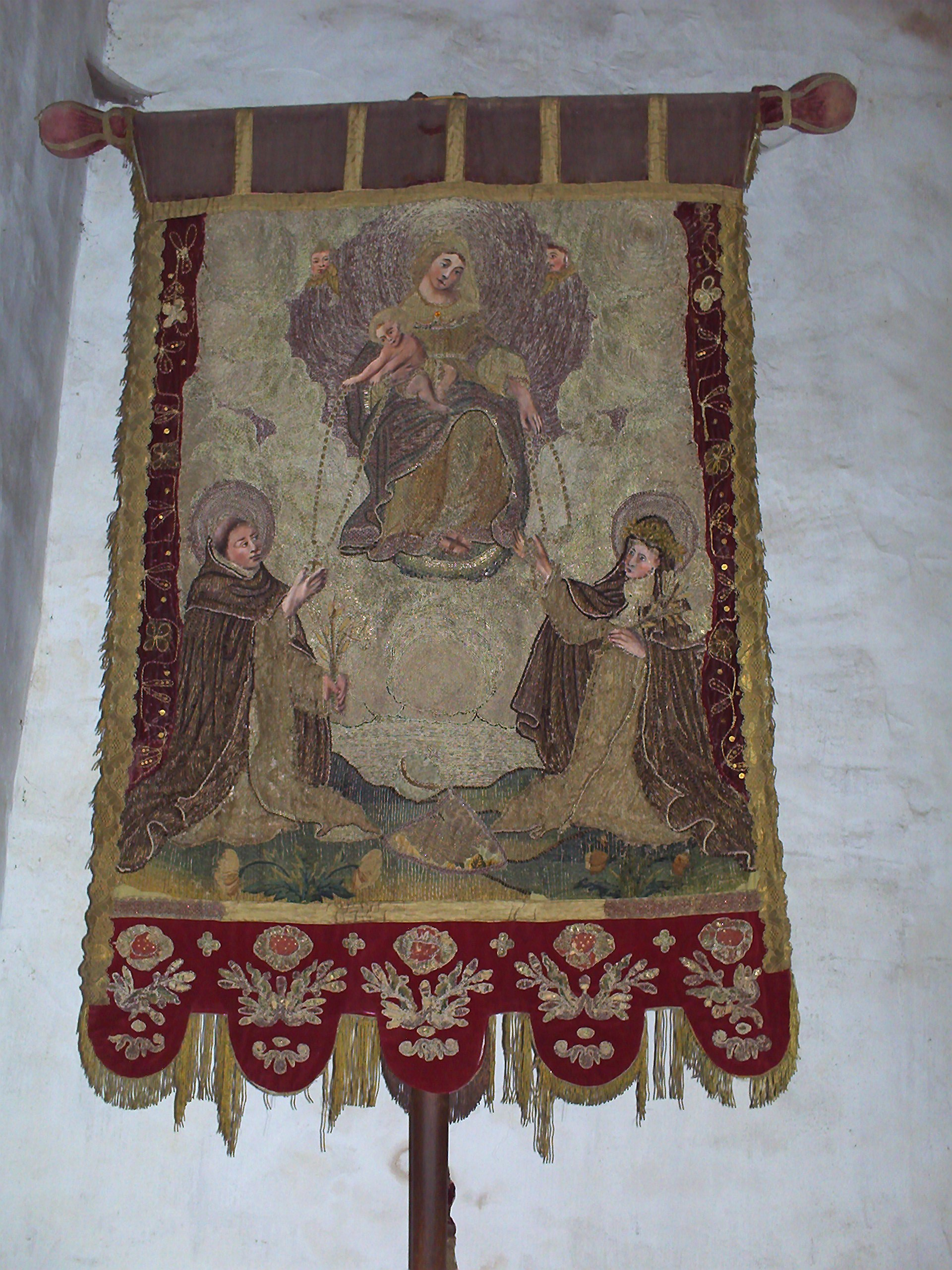
Banner of the Blessed Virgin Mary.

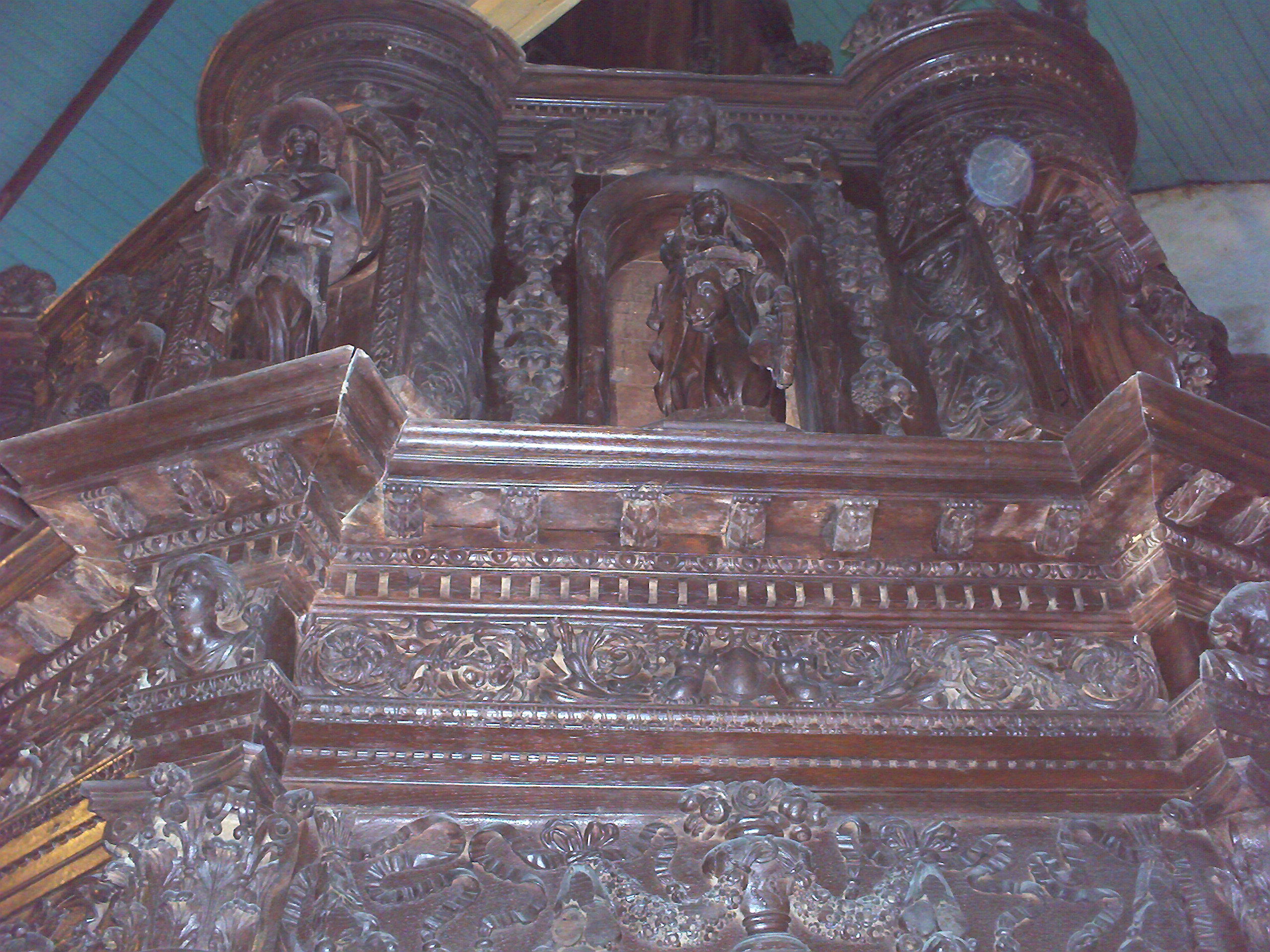
Detail of the carved pulpit.

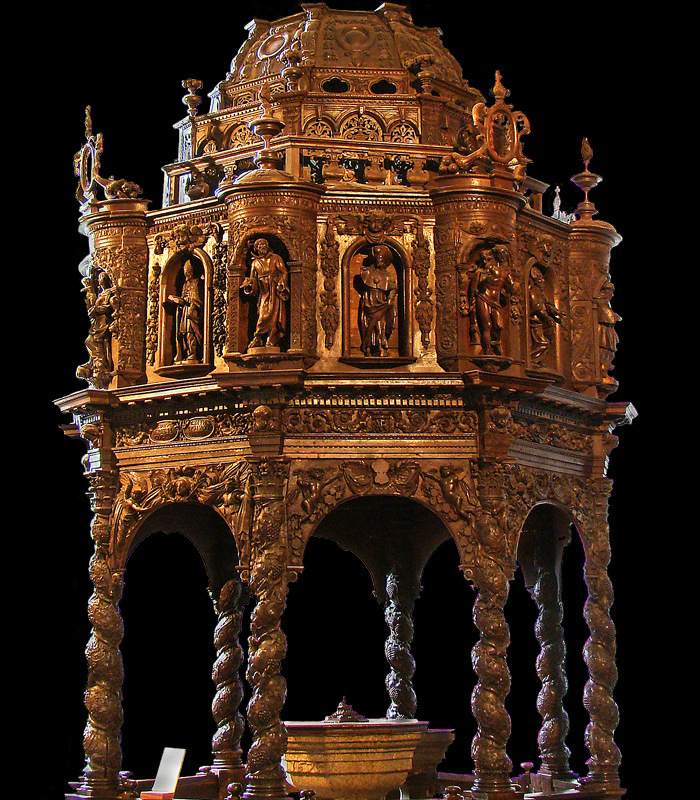
Oak carved baptistry.

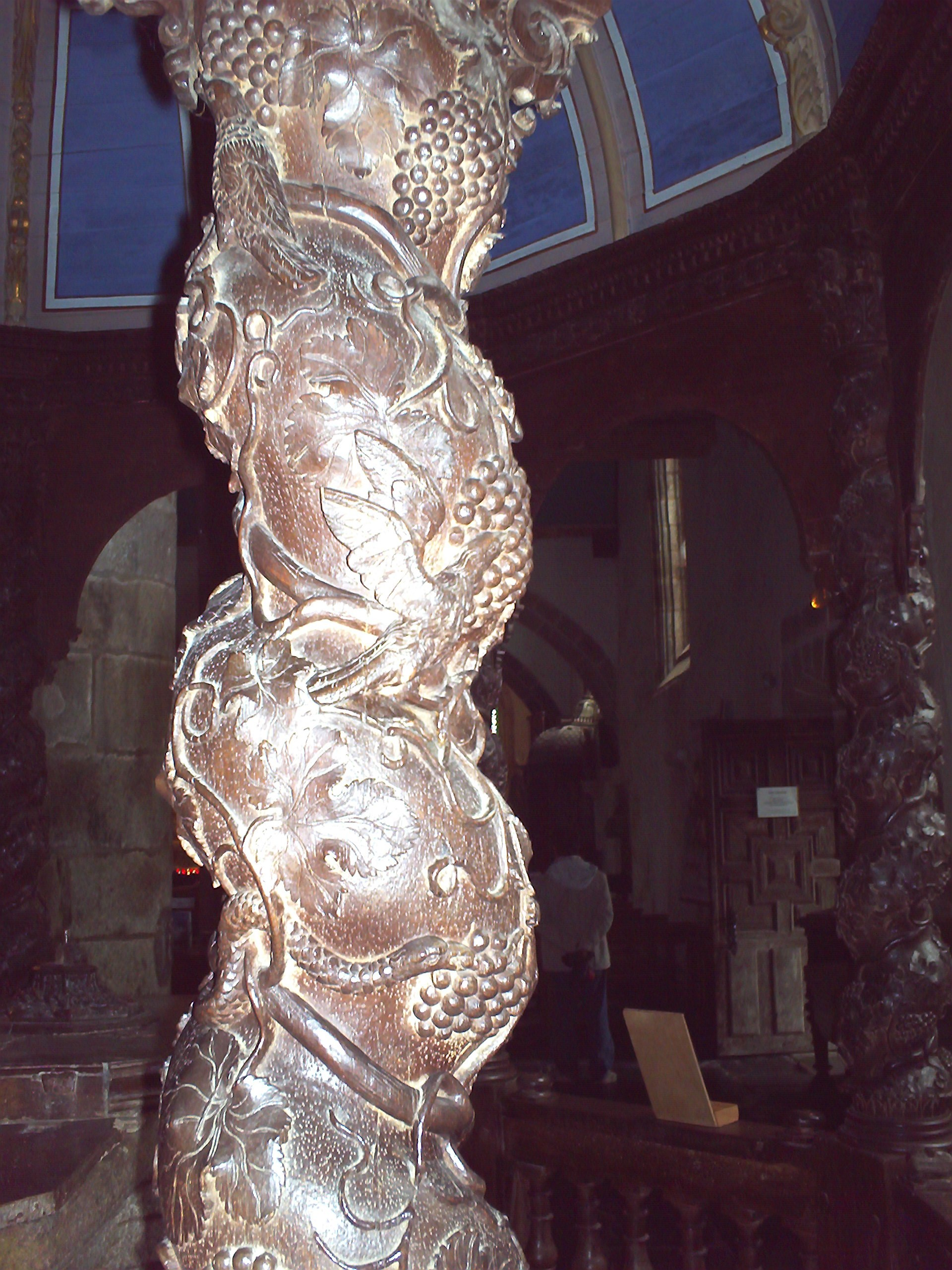
Carvings of birds, snakes and vines on the baptistery pillars.

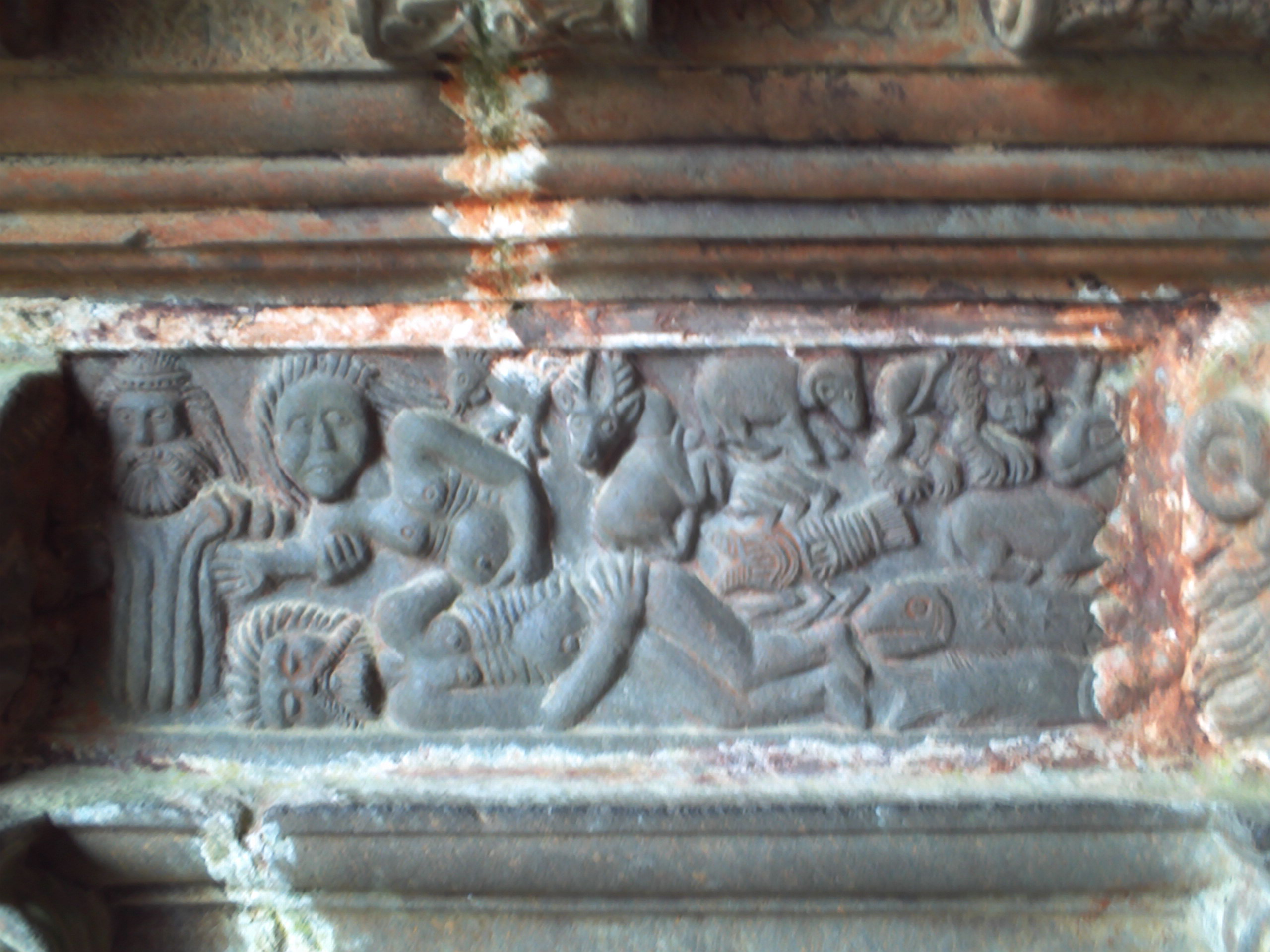
Medieval carving in the porch of the church.

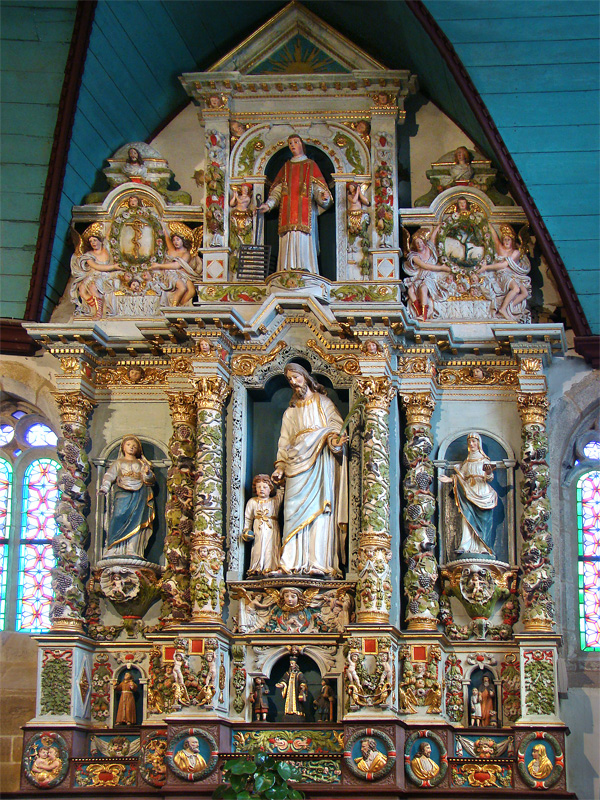
Retable of Saint Joseph, shown in the centre with the infant Christ.

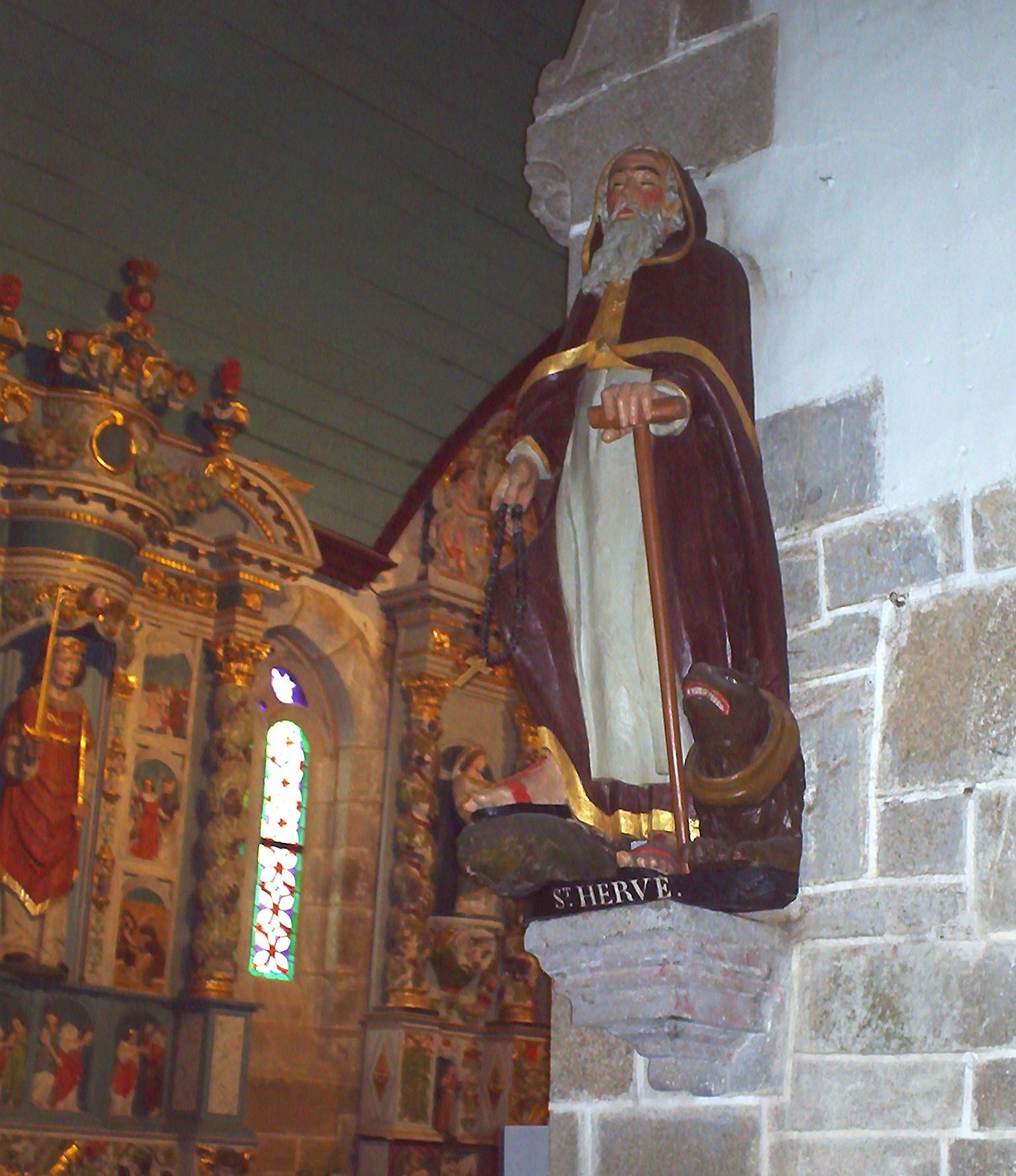
The two local saints: St Hervé, with St Miliau in the background.

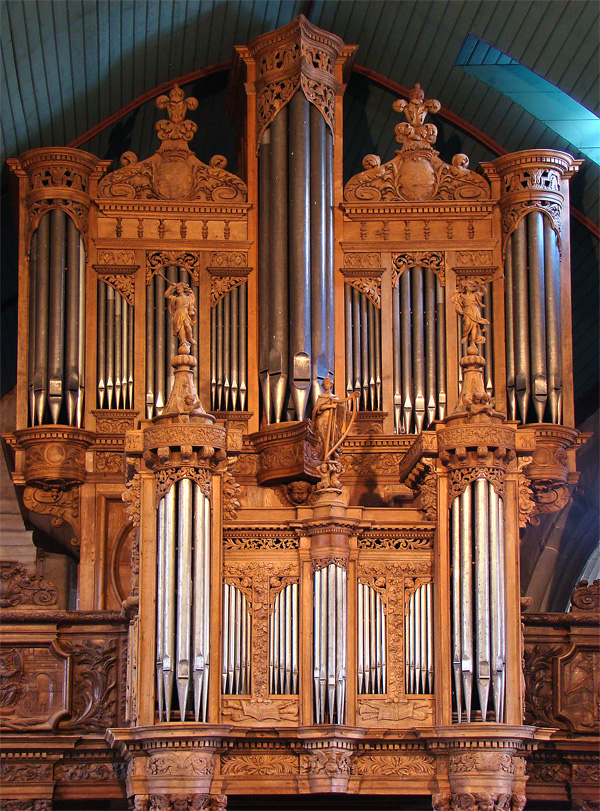
Dallam organ.

== See also ==
- Communes of the Finistère department
- List of the works of the Maître de Plougastel
