= Ronald Charles =

British Army general (1875–1955)

Lieutenant-General Sir Ronald Charles KCB CMG DSO
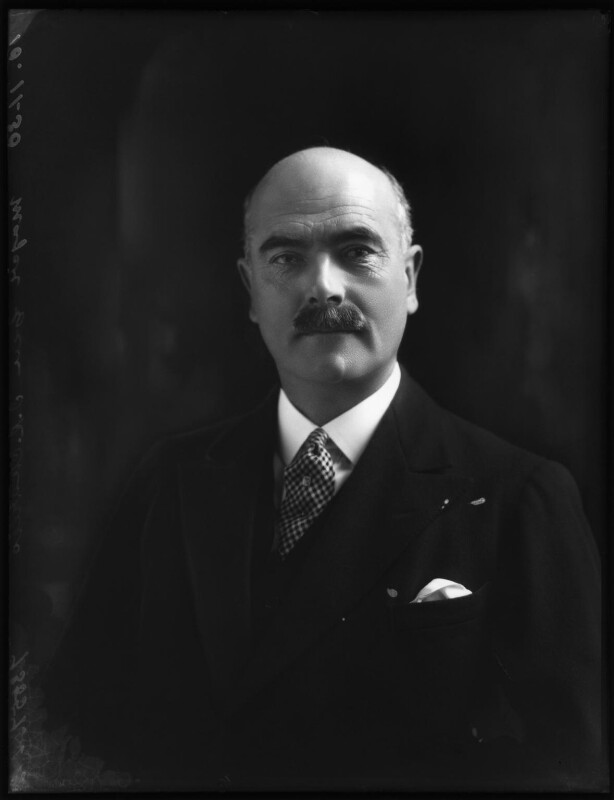
- Sir Ronald Charles by Bassano Ltd, 1930
- Born: 26 June 1875; Calcutta, British India
- Died: 24 December 1955 (aged 80); Somerset, England
- Military career
- Allegiance: United Kingdom
- Branch: British Army
- Service years: 1894–1934
- Rank: Lieutenant-General
- Unit: Royal Engineers
- Commands: Royal Military Academy, Woolwich; Waziristan Force; 25th Division
- Conflicts: Second Boer War; First World War
- Awards: Knight Commander of the Order of the Bath; Companion of the Order of St Michael and St George; Distinguished Service Order; Mentioned in Despatches

Lieutenant-General Sir James Ronald Edmondston Charles, KCB, CMG, DSO (26 June 1875 – 24 December 1955) was a senior British Army officer in the Royal Engineers.

== Family ==
Charles was born in Calcutta, British India, the son of Thomas Edmondston Charles, later honorary physician to King Edward VII, and Ada Henrietta Charles. He had two older sisters, Bessie and Ethel, who both studied architecture and became the first women members of the Royal Institute of British Architects.

== Military career ==
Charles was educated at Winchester College and the Royal Military Academy Sandhurst, and was commissioned into the Royal Engineers in 1894. He served in the Second Boer War (1899–1901), was mentioned in despatches (31 March 1900), and received the Distinguished Service Order in November 1900. He was part of the Bazar Valley and Mohmand Field Forces in 1908.

Charles spent most of the First World War in the General Staff until being promoted to command a re-constituted 25th Division in August 1918. He was promoted to major general on 3 January 1923, appointed commander of the Waziristan Force in India in 1923 and then became commandant of the Royal Military Academy, Woolwich, in 1924. He was Director of Military Operations and Intelligence at the War Office from 1926 and Master-General of the Ordnance from 1931. He retired in 1934.

Charles' nickname among the troops was 'Don Carlos', deriving from his commanding personality and his height of 6’ 4". He was also commandant of the Royal Engineers from 1931 to 1945 and Chief Royal Engineer from 1940 to 1946.

== Civilian roles ==
From 1934 to 1953, Charles was a director of British Aluminium Company, appointed for his high level connections and knowledge of defence procurement procedures gained at the War Office and as Master General of the Ordnance.

Military offices
Preceded by Webb Gillman	Commandant of the Royal Military Academy Woolwich; 1924–1926	Succeeded by Hugo de Pree
Preceded by John Burnett-Stuart	Director of Military Operations and Intelligence; 1926–1931	Succeeded by William Bartholomew
Preceded by Sir Webb Gillman	Master-General of the Ordnance; 1931–1934	Succeeded by Sir Hugh Elles
Honorary titles
Preceded by Sir Bindon Blood	Chief Royal Engineer; 1946–1951	Succeeded by Sir Guy Williams
