= Arthur Christmas =

2011 American animated Christmas comedy film

- British theatrical release poster
- Directed by: Sarah Smith
- Written by: Peter Baynham; Sarah Smith
- Produced by: Peter Lord; David Sproxton; Carla Shelley; Steve Pegram
- Starring: James McAvoy; Hugh Laurie; Bill Nighy; Jim Broadbent; Imelda Staunton; Ashley Jensen
- Cinematography: Jericca Cleland
- Edited by: James Cooper; John Carnochan
- Music by: Harry Gregson-Williams
- Production companies: Columbia Pictures; Sony Pictures Animation; Aardman Features
- Distributed by: Sony Pictures Releasing
- Release dates: 11 November 2011 (United Kingdom); 23 November 2011 (United States)
- Running time: 97 minutes
- Countries: United Kingdom; United States
- Language: English
- Budget: $100 million
- Box office: $147.4 million

Arthur Christmas is a 2011 animated Christmas comedy film directed by Sarah Smith, who co-wrote it with Peter Baynham. It was produced by Columbia Pictures, Sony Pictures Animation, and Aardman Features as the latter's second computer-animated feature film, following Flushed Away (2006). The voice cast features James McAvoy, Hugh Laurie, Bill Nighy, Jim Broadbent, Imelda Staunton, and Ashley Jensen. The film follows Santa Claus' son, Arthur (McAvoy), as he works to deliver a bicycle to Trelew, England before Christmas morning.

Following the under-performance of Flushed Away, DreamWorks Animation did not renew its partnership with Aardman. In April 2007, Aardman signed a three-year deal with Sony Pictures. Originally titled Operation Rudolph, the project was first announced in 2007. Aardman spent 18 months on pre-production on the story and design in the UK before relocating to Sony's animation studio in Culver City, California, for another 18 months of production. On 27 April 2009, it was reported that production had begun with Aardman and Sony Pictures Imageworks working together on animation.

Arthur Christmas was released on 11 November 2011 in the United Kingdom, and on 23 November in the United States by Sony Pictures Releasing. The film received positive reviews from critics, though it underperformed at the box-office, grossing $147 million against a $100 million budget.

== Plot ==
Instead of a single individual, Santa Claus is a hereditary title, handed down from father to son since the time of Saint Nicholas. Malcolm, the twentieth Santa, is heading his seventieth mission, which, according to tradition, is the mission before his retirement. However, his role has been reduced to a figurehead. The traditional sleigh has been replaced by a high-tech vessel called the S-1, operated by hundreds of elves who deliver gifts using military precision and automated gadgets. These operations are managed by Malcolm's son, Steve, from a control room beneath the North Pole, while Steve's clumsy but cheerful younger brother, Arthur, answers letters sent to Santa. During the mission, a child almost sees Malcolm. As the elves rescue him, a wrapped bicycle for a girl named Gwen Hines from Trelew, Cornwall, England falls off of the S-1's conveyor belt into the shadows.

After returning to the North Pole, Malcolm unexpectedly announces that he is still not ready to retire and hand over his role to Steve. Arthur and his mother, Margaret, try to get the rest of the family to enjoy Christmas via a board game, but tensions run high between Steve and Malcolm's ancient father, Grandsanta, who believes that Christmas has become too modernised.

While cleaning the S-1, an elf named Bryony Shelfly finds the lost present. Arthur wants to take the S-1 out again to deliver the present, but Steve convinces Malcolm that one gift out of billions is acceptable. After the others have left, Grandsanta hears Arthur fretting and offers to take the original sleigh, Eve, (mispronounced as “Evie") out from where he had secretly hidden it to keep it from being scrapped.

Using magic Aurora dust and the great-great grandchildren of the original eight reindeer, they set out to deliver the present. Bryony stows away with them. Along the way, the trio cause several mishaps, lose a few of the reindeer, and accidentally arrive in Trelew, Mexico, nearly setting off an international military incident.

Through all of this, Arthur and Bryony learn that Grandsanta only came to prove that he is still relevant. The elves suggest that Steve can help Arthur deliver the present from the command center, but he refuses, calling Arthur and ordering him to return home. Arthur insists that Malcolm would want them to deliver the present, but Steve convinces a distraught Arthur that Malcolm likely has gone to bed unfazed. Arthur, Grandsanta, and Bryony lose the sleigh, stranding themselves on an island in Cuba. Grandsanta reveals to Arthur that the reason why he wanted to prove that he is still relevant is because Steve decided to scrap the sleigh after he nearly caused a World War 3 during the Cuban Missile Crisis. Arthur realizes that Gwen will still believe in Santa no matter who delivers her present, and manages to retrieve the sleigh.

Distraught by Steve's actions, several elves wake Malcolm and Margaret, who decide to set out in the S-1 to rescue Arthur and deliver Gwen’s present. Steve comes along uninvited. Unable to pilot the S-1 alone, Malcolm reluctantly decides to let Steve drive. Like Arthur, the S-1 also initially arrives in Trelew, Mexico. While correcting the error, Steve discovers that he is not good with children.

Arthur, Grandsanta, and Bryony lose the remaining reindeer. A Predator jet opens fire on them over England, destroying the sleigh as its occupants bail out. The four male Clauses arrive at Gwen's house before she wakes up, only for Malcolm, Grandsanta, and Steve to argue over who gets to place her gift under her tree. Realizing that only Arthur truly cares about Gwen, Malcolm decides that they should let him do it. The Claus family watches from a nearby closet as Gwen delightedly opens her gift. Prompted by Malcolm, Steve acknowledges that Arthur is the true worthy Santa, and forfeits his birthright.

One year later, Malcolm retires to spend time with Grandsanta and Margaret, Steve becomes Arthur's Chief Operating Officer, Bryony is promoted to vice-president of Packing (Pacific Division), Grandsanta's lost reindeer eventually find their way home, and Arthur renames the S-1 "EVIE" in honor of Grandsanta's sleigh, refitting it to be pulled by five thousand reindeer.

== Voice cast ==
=== Claus family ===
- James McAvoy as Arthur Claus, Malcolm and Margaret's clumsy, eccentric, nervous and good-natured younger son who works in the mailroom and believes all children are special. He is Steve's younger brother and Grandsanta's younger grandson.
- Hugh Laurie as Steven "Steve" Claus, Malcolm and Margaret's older son who runs mission control and is very serious and technologically minded; he is largely responsible for the modernization of the gift-giving process. He is Arthur's older brother and Grandsanta's older grandson.
- Bill Nighy as Grandsanta, a 136 year old, stubborn, reckless, staunchly traditional former Santa unfamiliar with the modern world. A post-retirement joyriding incident during the Cuban Missile Crisis caused the Claus family to ban him from flying and attempt to scrap the sleigh, so he hides it and his trained reindeer in a secret vault. He is Malcolm's father, Margaret's father-in-law, and Arthur and Steve's grandfather.
- Jim Broadbent as Malcolm Claus / Santa Claus, the affable and ineffective man in charge at the North Pole. He is Grandsanta's son, Margaret's husband and Steve and Arthur's father.
- Imelda Staunton as Margaret Claus / Mrs. Claus, Malcolm's wife and Steve and Arthur's mother. She handles diplomatic relations and keeps things running smoothly at home while her husband is working.

=== Christmas elves ===
- Ashley Jensen as Bryony Shelfley, a Christmas elf with a Scottish accent who ends up tagging along with Arthur and Grandsanta on a mission to deliver the present for Gwen Hines.
- Marc Wootton as Peter, a Christmas elf and Steve's obsequious assistant.
- Michael Palin as Ernie Clicker, a Christmas elf and the former head of the Polar communications. He is brought out of retirement to help Steve find Grandsanta's old-fashioned sleigh.

The lead Christmas elves are voiced by Sanjeev Bhaskar, Robbie Coltrane, Joan Cusack, Rhys Darby, Jane Horrocks, Iain McKee, Andy Serkis, and Dominic West.

The other Christmas elves are voiced by Peter Baynham, Kevin Cecil, Cody Cameron, Kevin Eldon, Rich Fulcher, Bronagh Gallagher, Pete Jack, Danny John-Jules, Emma Kennedy, Stewart Lee, Seamus Malone, Kris Pearn, Alan Short, Sarah Smith, and Adam Tandy.

=== Other characters ===
- Ramona Marquez as Gwen Hines, a little girl who lives in Trelew, Cornwall, England and requests a pink bicycle for Christmas.
- Laura Linney as the voice of the North Pole computer
- Eva Longoria as Chief De Silva, the head of UNFITA (which stands for "United Northern Federal International Treaty Alliance").
- Jerry Lambert as N.O.R.A.D.
- Miggie Donahoe as Pedro, a little boy whom Steve mistakes for Gwen when in Trelew, Mexico.
- Finlay Duff as French Boy
- Rich Hall as Idaho Man
- Clint Dyer and Donnie Long as the two reporters
- Deborah Findlay and David Schneider as the two generals
- Ian Ashpitel, Julia Davis and Kerry Shale as the three UNFITA employees

Additional voices by Tamsin Greig and Alistair McGowan.

== Production ==
Arthur Christmas was first announced in 2007, under the name Operation Rudolph. It was the first film made by Aardman Animations in partnership with Sony Pictures Entertainment and its subsidiaries (mainly Sony Pictures Animation), after they parted ways with DreamWorks Animation. In February 2009, Barry Cook joined Sarah Smith to co-direct Arthur Christmas. Because Smith previously worked in live-action television, Cook described his involvement as "help[ing] along with the animation, from designing the film and its characters to all of the storyboarding process."

Aardman spent 18 months on pre-production on the story and design in the UK before relocating to Sony's Culver City, US, for another 18 months of production. On 27 April 2009, it was reported that production had begun with Aardman and Sony Pictures Imageworks working together on animation.

== Music ==
The film was originally set to be scored by Michael Giacchino and Adam Cohen, but both were replaced by Harry Gregson-Williams at the last minute, having a short span to score the film. The music was distinguished into two approaches on how the Santa Claus family sees Christmas, especially through details that determine the two distinctive characters. Gregson-Williams described the score as devoid of electronics and led by tunes, melody and themes. He used an ensemble orchestra containing 80 players, to provide a colourful orchestration. The album was released on 14 November 2011 by Sony Classical.

== Release ==
Arthur Christmas was released on 11 November 2011 in the United Kingdom and on 23 November 2011 in the United States. The music video for Justin Bieber's rendition of "Santa Claus Is Comin' to Town", which plays over the end credits, was exclusively shown in theatres before the film.

=== Home media ===
Arthur Christmas was released on DVD, Blu-ray and Blu-ray 3D on 6 November 2012, in the US, and 19 November 2012 in the UK.

== Reception ==
=== Critical response ===
Arthur Christmas holds an approval rating of 93% on Rotten Tomatoes based on 168 reviews, with an average score of 7.2/10. The consensus reads, "Aardman Animations broadens their humor a bit for Arthur Christmas, a clever and earnest holiday film with surprising emotional strength." On Metacritic, the film has a score of 69 out of 100 based on 32 reviews, indicating "generally favorable" reviews. Audiences polled by CinemaScore gave the film an average grade of "A−" on an A+ to F scale.

John Anderson of Newsday praised the film as "not only funny and fresh, but . . . a new way of tackling the whole yuletide paradigm: Santa as a high-tech hereditary monarchy." Michael O'Sullivan of The Washington Post described it as "unexpectedly fresh, despite the familiar-sounding premise".

Neil Genzlinger of The New York Times wrote that "the plot may be a little too cluttered for the toddler crowd to follow, but the next age group up should be amused, and the script by Peter Baynham and Sarah Smith has plenty of sly jokes for grown-ups." Rene Rodriguez of the Miami Herald stated that "the movie fails utterly at coming up with a story that merits all the eye candy."

Empire film critic Olly Richards gave the film four out of five stars, feeling that the "UFO plotline doesn't really hold together and, like Santa, the film's a little flabby around the middle, where it briefly quite literally starts going round in circles and loses a bit of the fun. But it finds an ending that stuffs in all the Christmas jollity and huggy business that is absolutely core to a Christmas movie but without the overdone syrupy nonsense that makes you want to go to the nearest shopping centre and kick over a nativity scene." He concluded that the film "could very well come to be regarded as a Christmas classic".

Richard Propes of Independent Critic called Arthur Christmas, "a good-hearted, silly and sweet film that it feels like the closest thing we've had in a few years to a minor Christmas classic. The film's mid-section flags a bit as Smith and co-writer Baynham can't quite seem to figure out how to completely flesh it out, but they recover nicely and serve up the holiday season's first salvo of cinematic delight". He praised the voice cast, though felt that Bieber's rendition of "Santa Claus Is Coming to Town" was "a disappointingly commercial twist on an otherwise tender-hearted and infectious Christmas film for the entire family." One reviewer, while light in criticism of the animation, called Bieber's musical performance "blatant" and "inexcusable".

=== Box office ===
Arthur Christmas earned $46,462,469 in North America, $33,334,089 in the UK, and $67,622,914 in other countries, for a worldwide total of $147,419,472.

In the United Kingdom the film opened in second place with a £2.5 million weekend gross, behind Immortals. It topped the box office in its fourth week, by which time the cumulative gross was £11.5 million. The film returned to the top of the box office on week seven, during Christmas week, grossing £2.05 million and a total of £19.7 million.

In the United States and Canada the film earned $2.4 million on its opening day and $1.8 million on Thanksgiving Day. It would go on to gross $12.1 million over the three-day weekend and $16.3 million over the five-day period. This was on par with studio expectations. The film went on to gross nearly $50 million domestically against a $100 million budget.

=== Accolades ===
Accolades received by Arthur Christmas
Award	Category	Recipient(s)	Result
Alliance of Women Film Journalists	Animated Film		Nominated
Annie Awards	Best Animated Feature		Nominated
Annie Awards	Character Design in a Feature Production	Peter de Sève	Nominated
Annie Awards	Storyboarding in a Feature Production	Kris Pearn	Nominated
Annie Awards	Voice Acting in a Feature Production	Ashley Jensen	Nominated
Annie Awards	Voice Acting in a Feature Production	Bill Nighy	Won
Annie Awards	Writing in a Feature Production	Sarah Smith, Peter Baynham	Nominated
British Academy of Film and Television Arts	Animated Film		Nominated
Broadcast Film Critics Association Awards	Best Animated Feature		Nominated
Chicago Film Critics Association	Animated Film		Nominated
Golden Globe Award	Best Animated Feature Film		Nominated
Online Film Critics Society	Best Animated Feature		Nominated
Satellite Awards	Motion Picture, Animated or Mixed Media		Nominated
San Diego Film Critics Society	Best Animated Film		Won
Visual Effects Society	Outstanding Visual Effects in an Animated Feature Motion Picture	Doug Ikeler, Chris Juen, Alan Short, Mandy Tankenson	Nominated
Visual Effects Society	Outstanding Virtual Cinematography in an Animated Feature Motion Picture	Michael Ford, David Morehead, Emi Tahira	Nominated
Women Film Critics Circle	Best Animated Females		Nominated
Young Artist Award	Best Performance in a Voice-over Role, Young Actress	Ramona Marquez	Nominated

== Video game ==
An iOS video game titled Arthur Christmas: Elf Run was released in the United Kingdom on 9 November 2011, on iTunes App Store. On 18 November 2011, the game was released worldwide on the iOS and Android platform. Released as a free and a premium version, the game allows players to play as delivery elves, who must quickly and quietly deliver gifts to children. Another iOS app based on the film is Arthur Christmas Movie Storybook, which was released on 30 November 2011.

== See also ==
- List of Christmas films
- Santa Claus in film
