= William Husband =

British engineer (1822–1887)

- Born: 13 October 1822; Mylor, Cornwall
- Died: 10 April 1887 (aged 64); Clifton, Bristol
- Spouse: Anne Nanney
- Children: Four
- Parent: James Husband
- Engineering career
- Discipline: Civil and mechanical engineer
- Projects: drainage of Haarlem Lake, Netherlands

William Husband (13 October 1822 – 10 April 1887) was a British civil and mechanical engineer of the 19th century.

== Biography ==
Husband, born at Mylor, Cornwall, on 13 October 1822, was eldest son of James Husband, shipbuilder and surveyor for Lloyd's Register at Falmouth, who died in 1859. He was educated first by Edgcombe Rimell, curate of Mabe, and afterwards at Bellevue Academy, Penryn.

=== Haarlem Lake ===
Husband declined to be either a sailor or a shipbuilder, as his father desired, and instead was in 1839 apprenticed for four years to Harvey & Co, engineers and ironfounders, of Hayle, Cornwall. His steadiness and ability soon won for him the esteem of his employers, and in 1843, when they had built the Leigh water engine for the drainage of Haarlem Lake, he was sent to the Netherlands to superintend its erection. As the machinery could not be landed for some time on account of the ice, he went to the village school at Sassenheym to learn Dutch. In six months he wrote and spoke it with fluency. On the death of the mechanical engineer in charge of the steam machinery on the drainage works in 1845, he succeeded to that post, when he planned and erected the half-weg engine. The lake when drained added 47,000 acres (190 km^{2}) of rich alluvial soil to the country, and being situated in the midst of populous provinces proved of material importance. King William expressed his satisfaction, and on 13 March 1848 Husband was elected a member of the Koninklijk Instituut van Ingenieurs. In 1849 he suffered so severely from ague, from the effects of which he never fully recovered, that he resigned his situation and returned to England.

=== Other works ===
While in the Netherlands, in conjunction with his friends Colonel Wiebeking and Professor Munnich, he invented a plan for drying and warehousing grain at a small cost, and preserving it in good condition for years. On 2 May 1851 he submitted to Sir George Grey a plan for a powder magazine in the Mersey, on the recommendation of the Liverpool town council. At the invitation of T. E. Blackwell, C.E., he went to Clifton to assist in some works in the Bristol docks, when he planned a bridge for the Cumberland basin. In September 1852 he undertook the management of the London business of the firm of Harvey & Company; in June 1854 he returned to Hayle to take the charge of the engineering department, and in 1863 became managing partner. He resumed the management of the business in London in October 1885, where he remained until his death.

In practical knowledge of hydraulic and mining machinery Husband was surpassed by few. In June 1859 he submitted to the Admiralty a plan for a floating battery, and patented the following inventions: the balance valve for water-work purposes (this superseded the costly stand-pipe), the four-beat pump-valve, a safety plug for the prevention of boiler explosions, and a safety equilibrium cataract, used with the Cornish pumping engine for the prevention of accidents. He also effected many improvements in pneumatic ore stamps, finally perfecting and patenting those now known as Husband's oscillating cylinder stamps.

During the last two years of his life he was employed in carrying out contracts for the pumping machinery at the Severn Tunnel, and at the time of his death was planning further improvements in Cornish pumping engines.

=== Professional and other interests ===
On 1 May 1866 he was elected a member of the Institution of Civil Engineers, and during 1881 and 1882 served as president of the Miners Association and Royal Institution of Cornwall. He actively supported the Royal Cornwall Polytechnic Society. In 1855 he planned and superintended the erection of a breakwater at Porthleven in Mount's Bay, thereby making it a safe harbour. He helped to secure a water supply for Hayle and a system of drainage. He originated and became first captain of the 8th Cornwall artillery volunteers in April 1860, a post which he held till 1865. He established science classes at Hayle in connection with South Kensington. In spectrum analysis and astronomy he took a great interest, and made many observations with a 10.25-inch (260 mm) telescope. On 28 and 29 March 1887, in company with Sir John Hawkshaw and Mr. Hayter, C.E., he was employed in inspecting nine pumping engines which his firm had erected in the Severn tunnel for keeping down the water.

=== Marriage and death ===
On 20 June 1850 he married Anne, fifth daughter of Edward Nanney, by whom he had a family of four children. He died on 10 April 1887 of an attack of gall stones at his lodgings, 26 Sion Hill, Clifton, Bristol, and was buried at St. Erth, Cornwall, 16 April. In 1890 a sum of £800. was raised to establish a Husband scholarship for the technical education of miners.
