= Melor =

Medieval Breton saint

Saint Melor
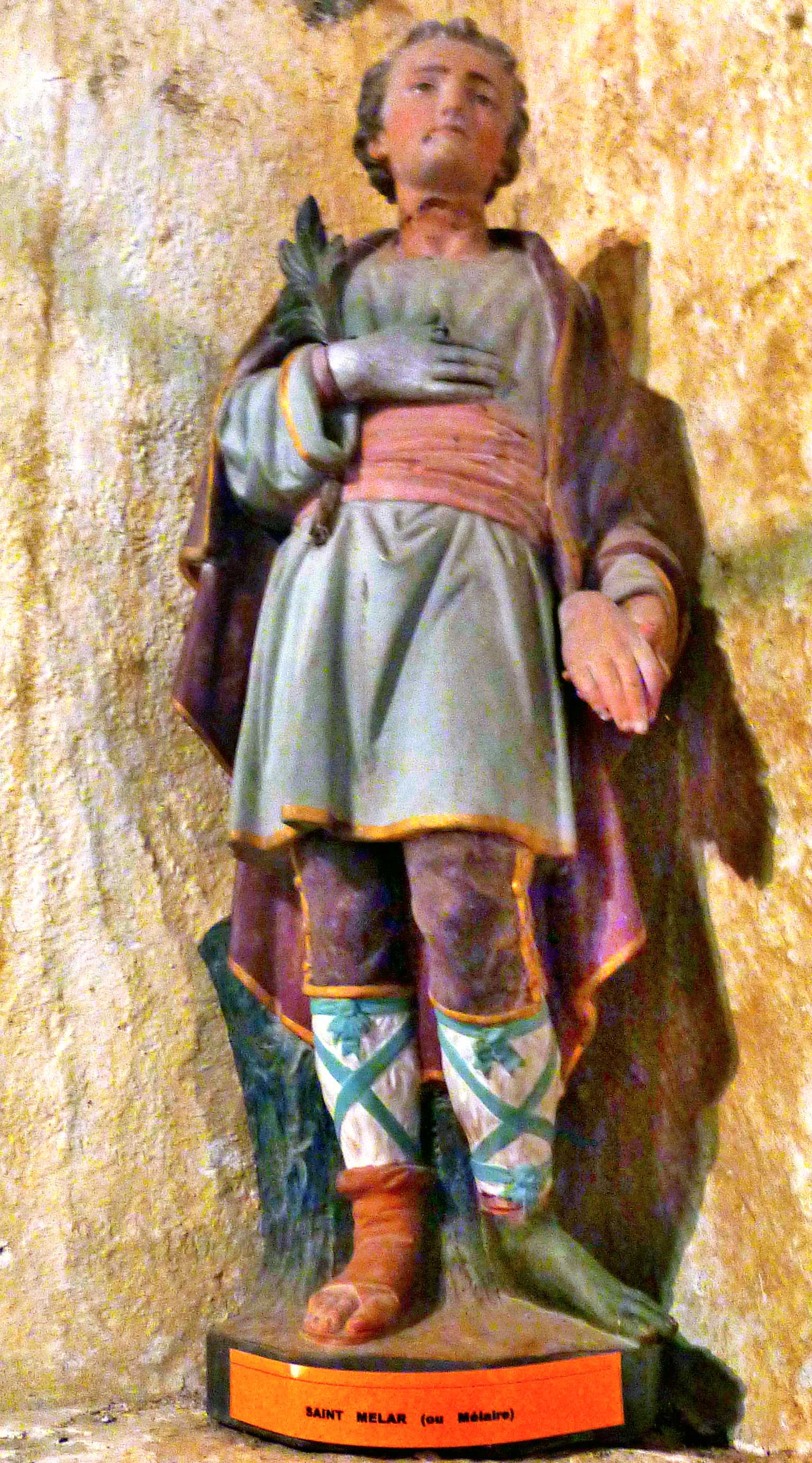
- Mélar in Chapelle Saint-Brieuc, Plonivel, Finistère, with severed hand
- Died: 10th-century
- Venerated in: Catholic Church
- Major shrine: Amesbury Abbey (original)
- Feast: 1 October (Exeter Cathedral); 3 January; 28 August (former); Sunday nearest 25 October; 4 December

Melor (also known in Latin as Melorius; in Cornish as Melor and in Cornu-English as Mylor; in French as Méloir; and other variations) was a 10th-century Breton saint who, in England, was venerated in Cornwall and at Amesbury Abbey, Wiltshire, which claimed some of his relics.

== Identity ==
There were probably two or three Breton saints named Melor who were conflated, and a handful of late medieval hagiographies record legends relating to him. Several churches in Brittany and two in Cornwall are dedicated to Melor; the primary cultic center was at Lanmeur. After his relics were acquired by Amesbury Abbey, he was adopted as a co-patron saint.

== Breton legend ==
Melor's legend makes him a prince who was only seven when his uncle, Rivod, murdered his father, St Miliau or Milio. Riwal wished the child's death also, but was dissuaded from carrying out his intentions by a council of bishops. At their intervention, he decided instead to maim the boy, cutting off his right hand (later replaced by a silver prosthesis) and left foot (replaced with one of bronze). Melor was then sent away to Quimper Abbey to be educated. Here, his metal limbs began to work as if they were natural, and to grow along with him. By the time the prince was fourteen, Rivod decided that he must die and ordered his guardian, Cerialtan, to kill him. The boy was decapitated. Rivod is said to have touched the severed head and to have died three days after. Melor was subsequently buried at Lanmeur in Brittany.

The cult of St Melor in Brittany grew to considerable importance and there are a number of place names and dedications to him. Locmélar (hermitage of Melor) is a parish in Finistère. The parish of Saint-Méloir-des-Ondes, in eastern Brittany, was founded by the monks of Mont Saint-Michel in the early 11th century.

== Melor in Britain ==
Melor's cult probably spread to Cornwall from Brittany. There are churches dedicated to him at Mylor and Linkinhorne in Cornwall, and at Amesbury in Wiltshire.

In the 10th century, Melor's body is said to have been taken on tour to England. When it was placed on the altar at Amesbury Abbey, it was prevented from being removed by the saint's own power. This legend was likely invented to explain the presence of Melor's relics at Amesbury. It seems likely that, along with those of other Breton saints such as Branwalader and Samson, they had been collected by King Athelstan, and given by him to monasteries in which he had a special interest. Amesbury was to become among the most famous of English medieval monasteries but, despite the nuns producing their own version of Mellor's 'vita', William of Malmesbury could not discover any information about its patron.

In the publication "Notes on the Parish of Mylor" (1907) is the following reference to the saint: "This St Melior or Melioris is reputed to have been the son of Melianus, Duke of Cornwall, and is said to have been slain for embracing Christianity, August 28, A. D. 411, by his pagan brother-in-law Rinaldus, or Remigius, who first cut off Milor’s right hand, then his left leg, and finally his head". But the book later quotes another source (the Somersetshire Archaeological Society, 1898) thus: "If we may credit the Legenda Sanctorum compiled by Bishop Grandisson, Meliorus was the son of Melainus, King of Cornwall, by his wife Aurella, a lady of Devon; that at seven years of age he lost his royal father; that his uncle Rivoldus by his father's side returning from abroad cruelly treated the youth and at length contrived his decapitation".

During the restoration of Mylor church in the late 19th century, an obelisk of granite which had been serving as a flying buttress was discovered to be the 17½-foot granite cross which had purportedly stood on St Mylor's grave. It was replaced in the churchyard on what was reckoned to be its original site.

The poet Charles Causley published "The Mystery of St Mylor" in his 1988 collection A Field of Vision.

== Feast day ==
The feast day of Prince Melor is 1 October. This is the date celebrated at Exeter Cathedral, although there are also alternative dates used in Cornwall. The feast days of St Melorus of Mylor are 3 January, 1 October and 25 October (Mylor feast used to be on 28 August but was transferred to the Sunday nearest 25 October). Bishop Melor's day is 4 December.

== Bibliography ==
- Farmer, David Hugh (1978) The Oxford Dictionary of Saints. Oxford: Oxford University Press
- Orme, Nicholas (2000). The Saints of Cornwall. Oxford University Press. ISBN 9780191542893.
- Doble, G. H. (1964) The Saints of Cornwall: part 3. Truro: Dean and Chapter; pp. 20–52
- Notes on the Parish of Mylor
- "A Field of Vision", Charles Causley, Macmillan, 1988
