= Mylor Creek =

Tidal ria in south Cornwall, England

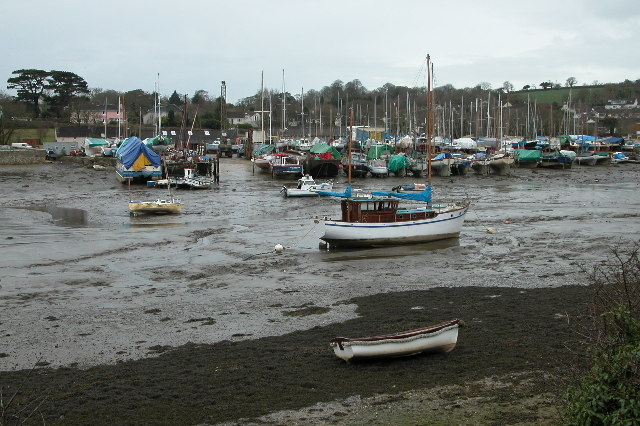
Mylor Creek at low water

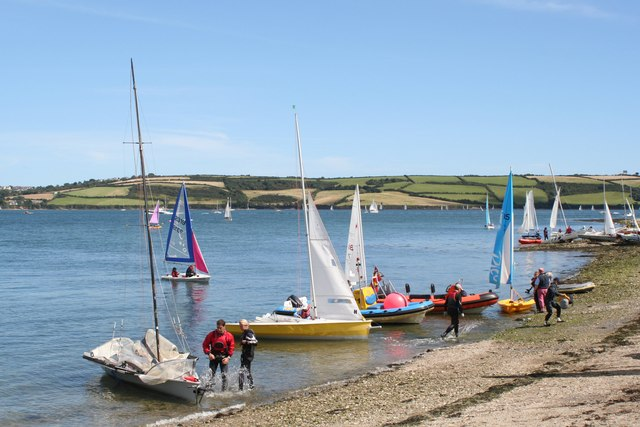
Restronguet Sailing Club near Mylor Harbour

Mylor Creek (Cornish: Pol Scathow, meaning creek of boats) is a tidal ria in south Cornwall, United Kingdom. It is a tributary of Carrick Roads, the estuary of the River Fal and is situated approximately six miles (10 km) south of Truro and two miles (3 km) north of Falmouth .

== Geography ==
The creek is in Mylor civil parish and forms an inland tidal lake. It is approximately 800 feet (240 m) at its widest point and just over a mile (1.8 km) long from its tidal limit at Mylor Bridge to its mouth at Mylor Churchtown where it discharges into Carrick Roads.

=== Locations ===
- Normal Tidal Limit (NTL) at Mylor Bridge coordinates 50.18396°N 5.07727°W grid reference SW 803 361
- Mouth (Mylor Harbour) coordinates 50.17882°N 5.05369°W grid reference SW 821 354

== History ==
At the entrance to the creek was the most westerly naval dockyard and victualling station in Britain, which, at high tide, covered 66 acres (27 ha) of water. During the second half of the 19th-century it was the base for HMS Ganges, a training ship for boys, and also the Falmouth Packets. During World War II the harbour was a base for operations conducted by the French Resistance. It is now home to the last remaining fleet of oyster fishermen.

== Recreation ==
Carrick Roads and Cornwall's English Channel coast are popular for yachting and dinghy racing. Restronguet Sailing Club (which takes its name from Restronguet Creek a mile to the north) has its base at Mylor Harbour, a large yacht marina immediately north of Mylor Churchtown.
