= Mylor, Cornwall =

Civil parish in Cornwall, England

Coordinates: 50.179°N 5.073°W

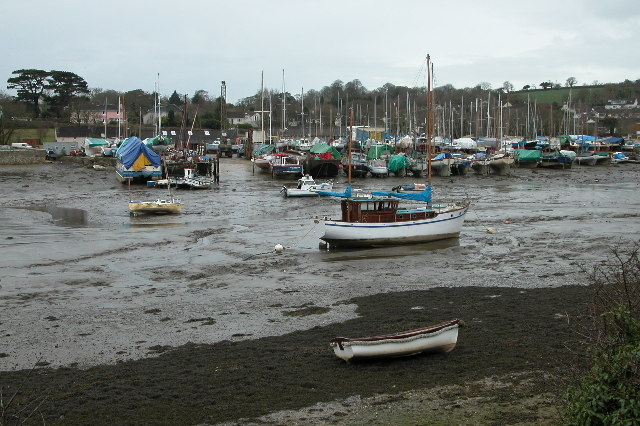
Mylor Creek

Mylor (Cornish: Lannwythek, meaning Gwythek's holy enclosure) is a civil parish in Cornwall, England, United Kingdom. It is situated approximately five miles north of Falmouth.

The church town of the ecclesiastical parish is Mylor Churchtown: however, Mylor Bridge is the largest village in the parish. Other settlements include Angarrick, Carclew, Flushing and Restronguet Passage.

== Geography ==
Mylor is a maritime parish and is bounded by water on three sides: Restronguet Creek to the north, Carrick Roads to the east and Falmouth Harbour to the south. To the west it is bounded by St Gluvias and Perranarworthal parishes. The parish population at the 2011 census including Flushing and Restronguet Passage is 2,697. The parish, named after Saint Melor, is in the Archdeaconry of Cornwall in the Diocese of Truro and the Deanery and Hundred of Kerrier. It was originally in Falmouth Registration District but is now in Truro Registration District.

Mylor lies within the Cornwall Area of Outstanding Natural Beauty (AONB).

The policing of Mylor is the responsibility of Devon and Cornwall Police who have a dedicated team known as the Penryn & Mylor Local Policing Team.

== Church history ==
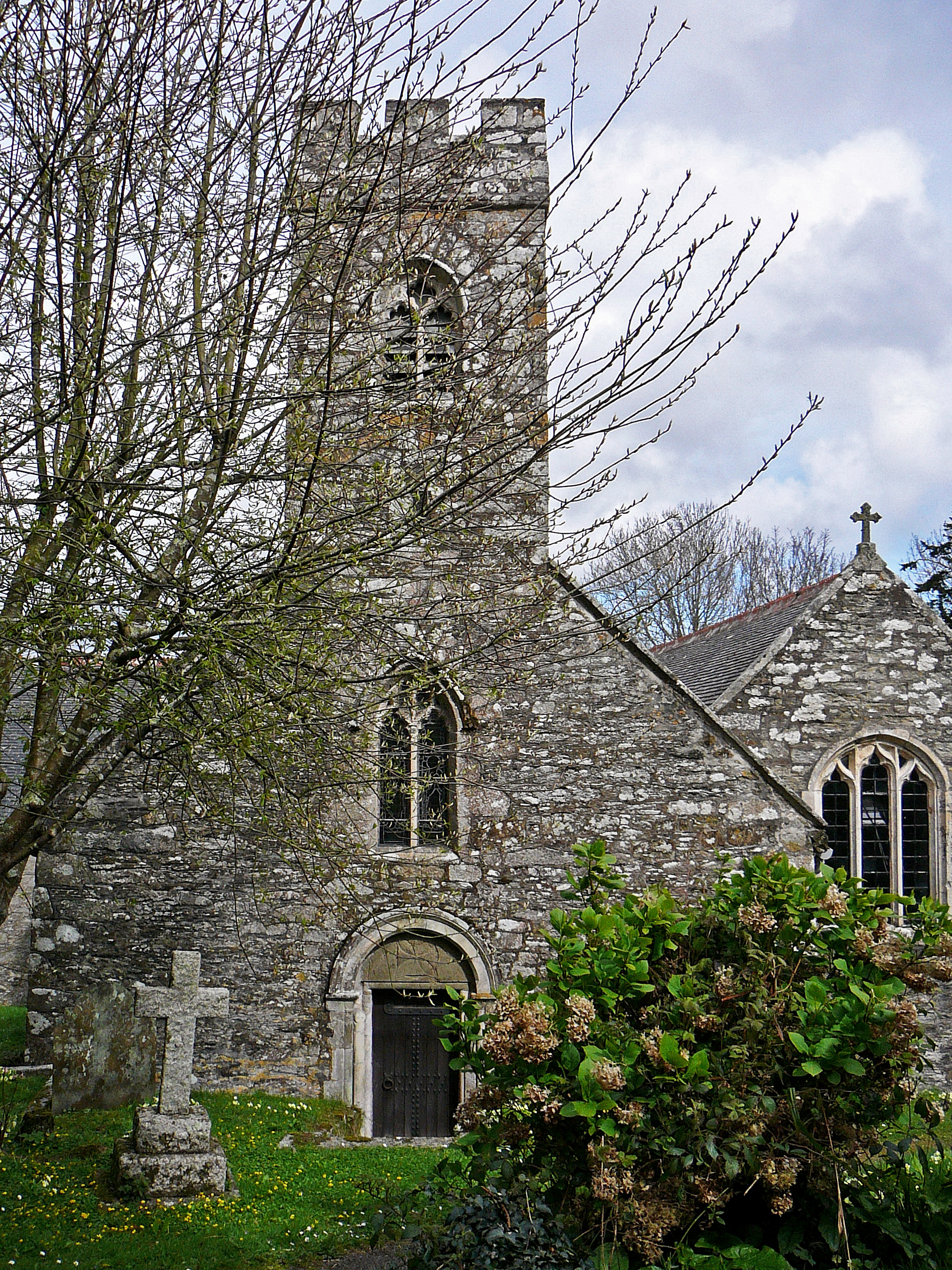
Mylor parish church

Mylor was in medieval times in the episcopal manor and peculiar deanery of Penryn and was also the mother church of Mabe. In 1277 there was a dispute between the Bishop of Exeter and the Earl of Cornwall over sand and soil which was being carried away from the glebe land of Mylor by agents of the Earl. In 1278 this was settled by the Bishop lifting the threat of excommunication he had made and redistributing the large sum of money he had collected as custom duty for the sand and soil. Bishop Peter Quinel gave the church and church land to the provostship of Glasney College in exchange for the deanery of Probus in 1288.

The feast days of St Melorus of Mylor are 3 January, 1 October and 25 October (Mylor feast used to be on 28 August but was transferred to the Sunday nearest 25 October).

=== Present day ===
Mylor Parish Church (Anglican) is in Mylor Churchtown and is dedicated to St Melorus. The present structure dates from a major reconstruction around 1870 but parts of the original church dated back to the Norman period and the church still has a Norman north door.

There were also Wesleyan Methodist and Primitive Methodist chapels in Mylor parish.

== Customs ==
A mummers play text which had, until recently, been attributed to Mylor (much quoted in early studies of folk plays, such as The Mummers Play by R. J. E. Tiddy – published posthumously in 1923 – and The English Folk-Play (1933) by E. K. Chambers) has now been shown, by genealogical and other research, to have originated in Truro, around 1780.

== Notable residents ==
- Thomas Tregosse (c.1600 - c.1670), Puritan minister, sometime Vicar of Mylor and Mabe
- Admiral Sir Bartholomew Sulivan (1810–1890), naval officer and hydrographer.
- Robert Terrill Rundle (1811–1896), the Wesleyan Methodist famous for his missionary work in Western Canada.
- Edward Hoblyn, Vicar of Mylor for 45 years in the 19th century
- William Husband (1822–1887), a civil and mechanical engineer
- Sir James Boucaut (1831–1916), Australian judge and politician, and three-times Premier of South Australia.
