= Mylor Churchtown =

Village in Cornwall, England

Coordinates: 50.177°N 5.055°W

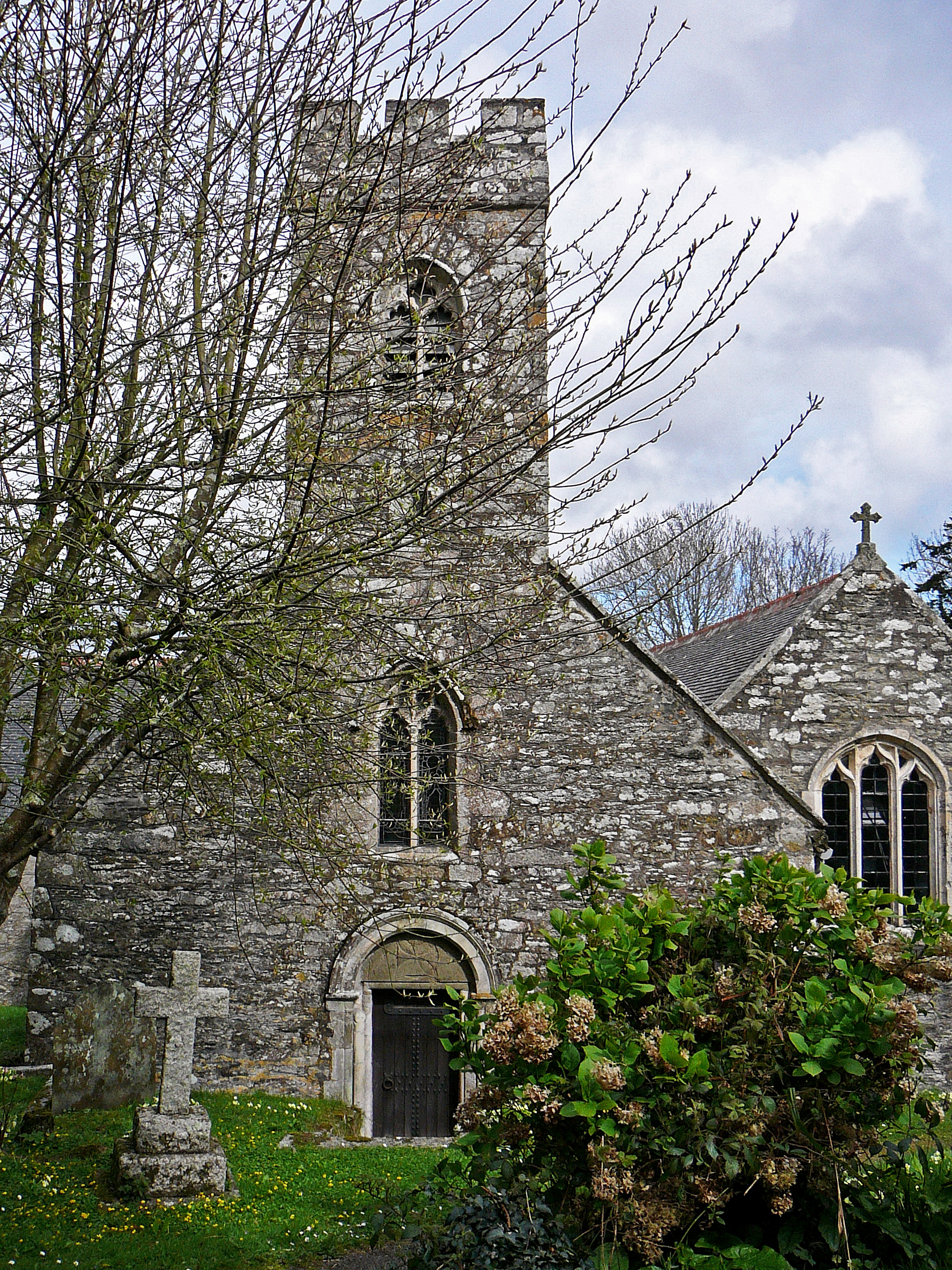
Mylor parish church

Mylor Churchtown is a coastal village in Cornwall, England. It is the church town of the ecclesiastical parish of Mylor and is situated at the mouth of Mylor Creek, approximately three miles north of Falmouth.

Mylor Yacht Harbour is a large yacht marina immediately north of Mylor Churchtown. It has been owned by the Graffy family since 1997.

Burgee of Restronguet Sailing Club

The marina is at the mouth of Mylor Creek at its confluence with Carrick Roads and is the home of Restronguet Sailing Club.

== Parish church ==
Mylor parish church (Anglican), dedicated to St Melorus, stands in Mylor Churchtown. It has Norman origins and was built on a cruciform plan, with a south aisle added in the 15th century. The church has a small west tower, but its three bells (the earliest dated 1637) hang in a detached campanile. One bell bears a Latin inscription.

Notable features include 13th-century carving of the Crucifixion outside the north transept, a 15th-century pillar piscina, an Elizabethan pulpit, and a well-preserved rood screen with a painted Cornish inscription. Monuments commemorate Francis Trefusis (d. 1680) and Reginald Cocks (d. 1805). A memorial screen marks the thirty-one victims of the MV Darlwyne disaster of 1966.

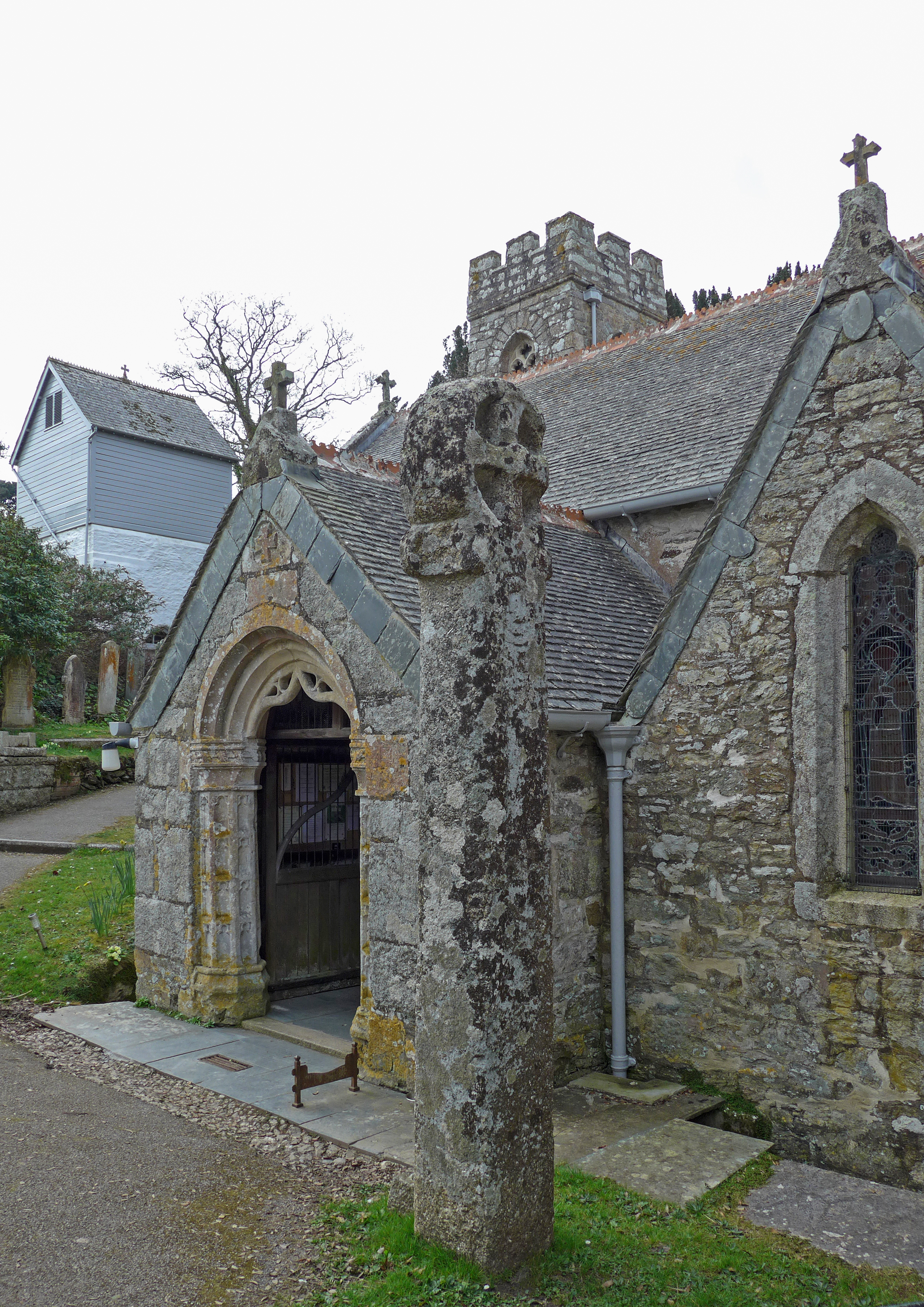
The cross in the churchyard

The churchyard contains the largest standing cross in Cornwall (10 ft high), identified as such in 1870 after having been used as a post. It was re-erected by sailors from HMS Ganges. The oldest gravestone is that of Thomas Peter, a former vicar who later became the first minister at New London. Another memorial stone records the victims of the wreck of the Queen at Trefusis Point.
