= Mylor Bridge =

Coordinates: 50.186°N 5.078°W

Mylor Bridge: Cornish: Ponsnowydh
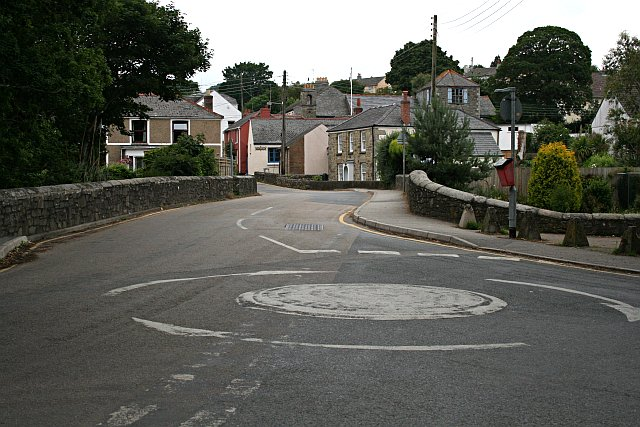
- Mylor Bridge

- Location within Cornwall
- OS grid reference: SW804363
- Civil parish: Mylor
- Unitary authority: Cornwall
- Ceremonial county: Cornwall
- Region: South West
- Country: England
- Sovereign state: United Kingdom
- Post town: FALMOUTH
- Postcode district: TR11
- Dialling code: 01326
- Police: Devon and Cornwall
- Fire: Cornwall
- Ambulance: South Western
- UK Parliament: Truro and Falmouth

Mylor Bridge (Cornish: Ponsnowydh) is a village in Cornwall, England, United Kingdom. It is in Mylor civil parish at the head of Mylor Creek, about five miles north of Falmouth.

Found in Mylor Bridge are a Post Office/Newsagents, grocery store, fishmonger, hairdressers, a dental practice, butcher's shop and a public house called the Lemon Arms. The village also has a primary school. The parish church of Saint Mylor is in the nearby village of Mylor Churchtown.

Mylor Bridge lies within the Cornwall Area of Outstanding Natural Beauty (AONB).

== Governance ==
The village is represented as Penryn East and Mylor on Cornwall Council. It was formerly in the Falmouth and Camborne parliamentary electoral constituency; since 2010 it has been in the Truro and Falmouth constituency. Notably, the former Member for Parliament (MP) for Truro and Falmouth, Sarah Newton, lives on Church Road in Mylor Bridge.
