= Cléden-Poher Parish close =

Coordinates: 48.2354°N 3.6696°W

The Cléden-Poher Parish close (enclos paroissial) comprises the Église Notre-Dame de l'Assomption, a calvary and an ossuary, and is located in the arrondissement of Châteaulin in Finistère in Brittany in north-western France. It is a listed historical monument since 1983.

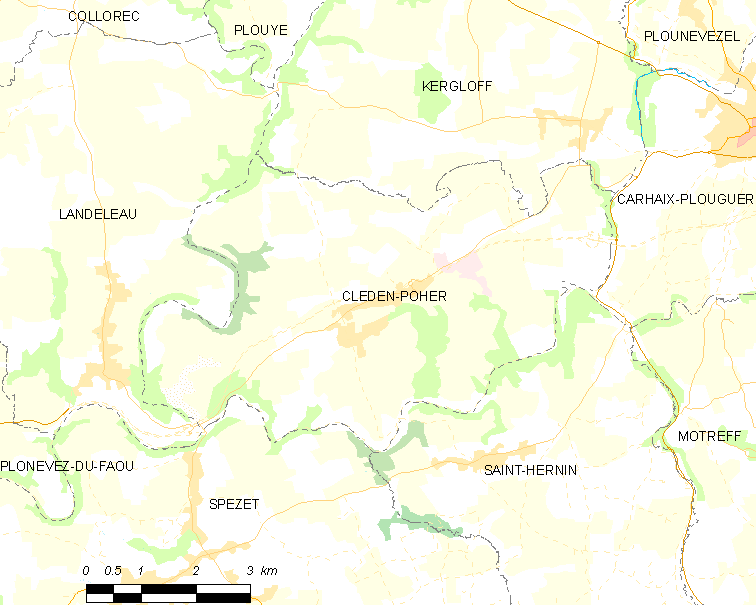
Map showing location Cléden-Poher

The Église Notre-Dame-de-l’Assomption was restored and modified in 1689 and in 1907.

== The north porch ==
This porch contains statues of Catherine of Sienna, Saint Francis of Assisi and Saint Dominic.

== The west façade ==
There are two double doors here which gives access to the church. The tympanum contains a statue of the Virgin Mary.

== The master altar ==
This comprises three scenes; The procession to Golgotha, the crucifixion and a mise au tombeau; Jesus being prepared for burial.

== The ossuary ==
The ossuary, partly gothic and partly renaissance in style, is located in the north east corner of the cemetery.

== The calvary ==
This dates to 1575 and depicts various scenes from the passion including the Flagellation, a scene showing the cross being carried to Golgotha and Jesus on the cross. Angels collect Jesus' blood into chalices.

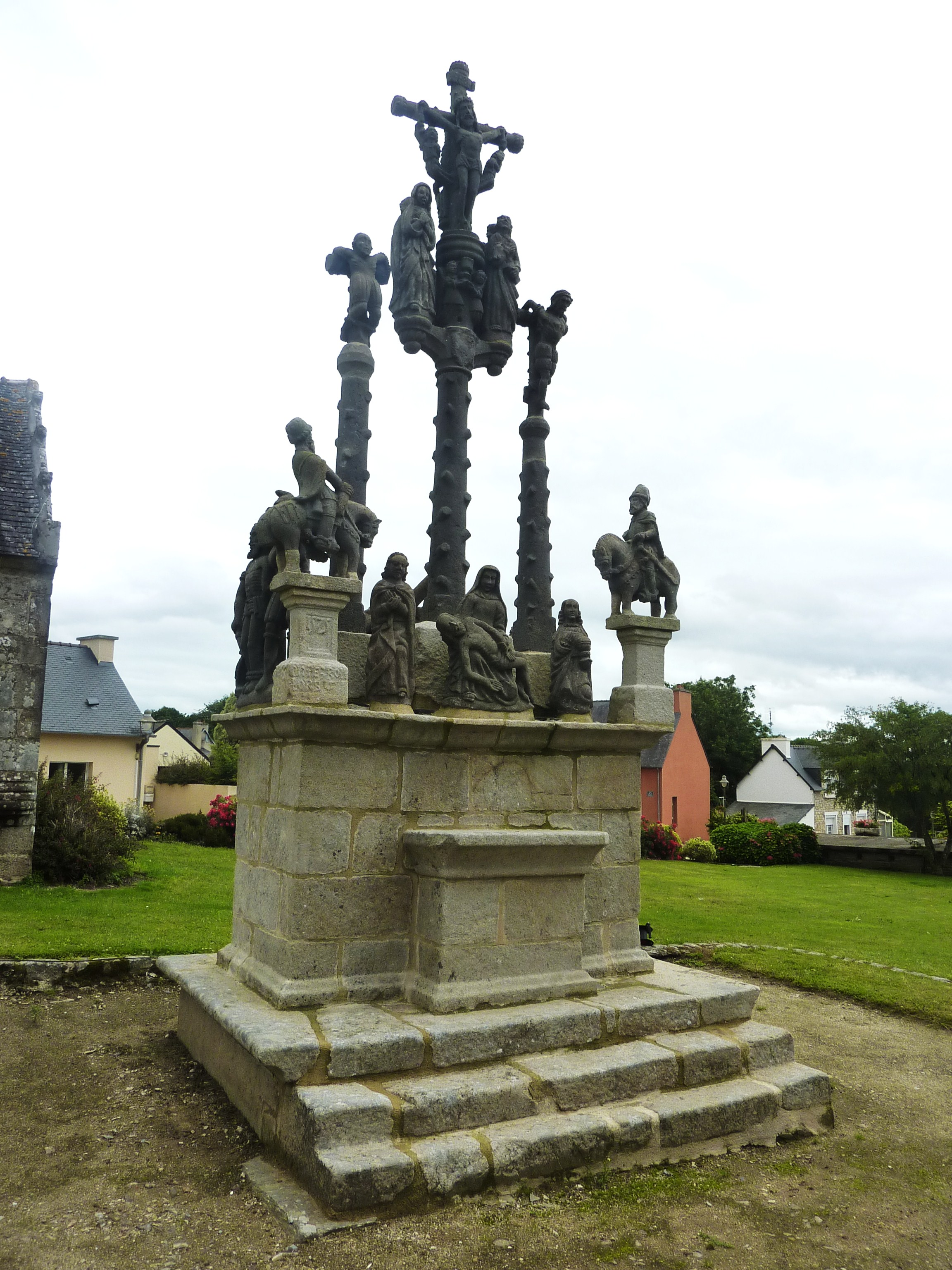
The Cléden-Poher calvary.

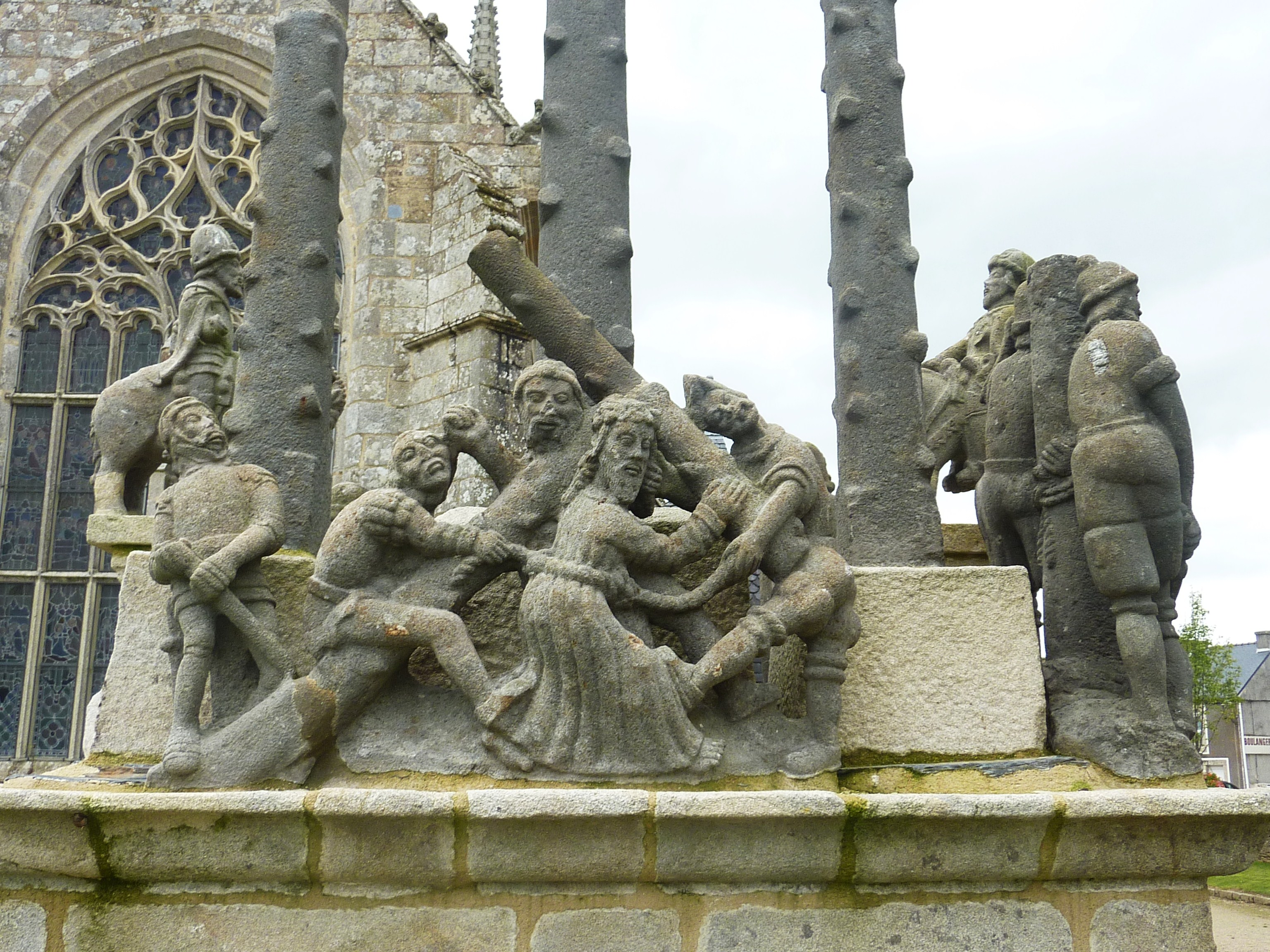
The Cléden-Poher calvary.

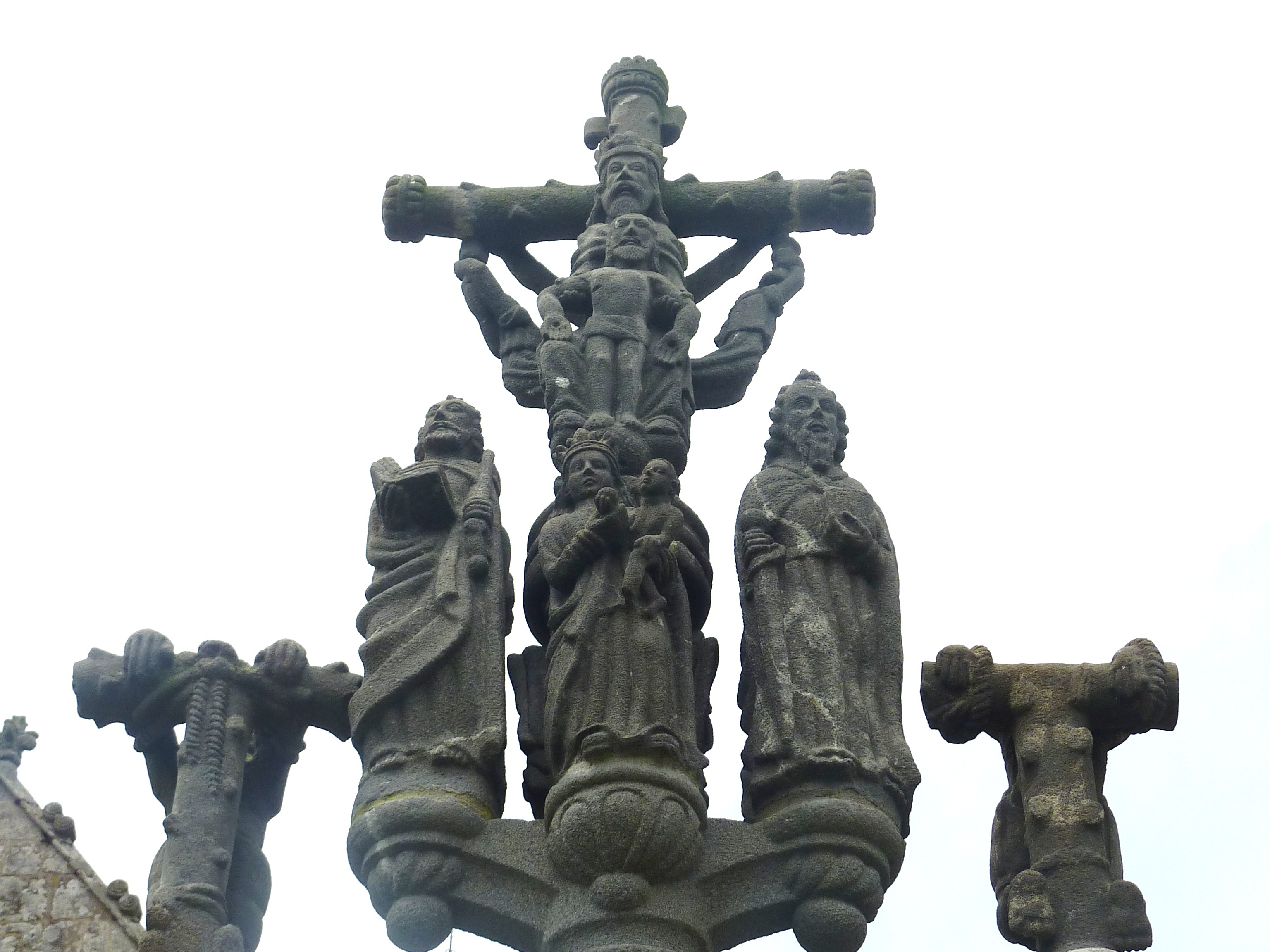
The Cléden-Poher calvary.

== Gallery ==
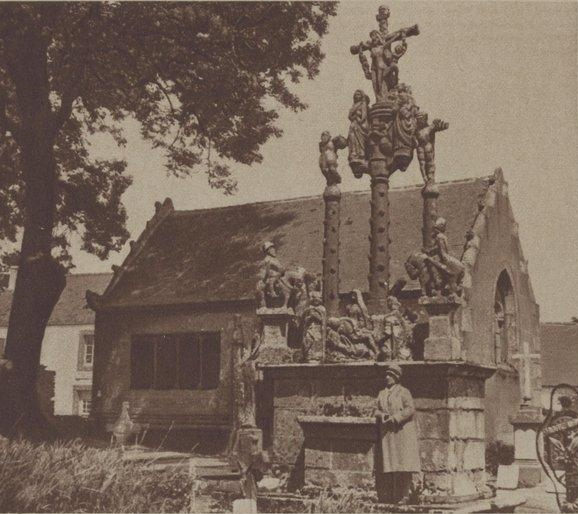
The ossuary and calvary. Revue du Touring-club de France photograph taken in 1936.

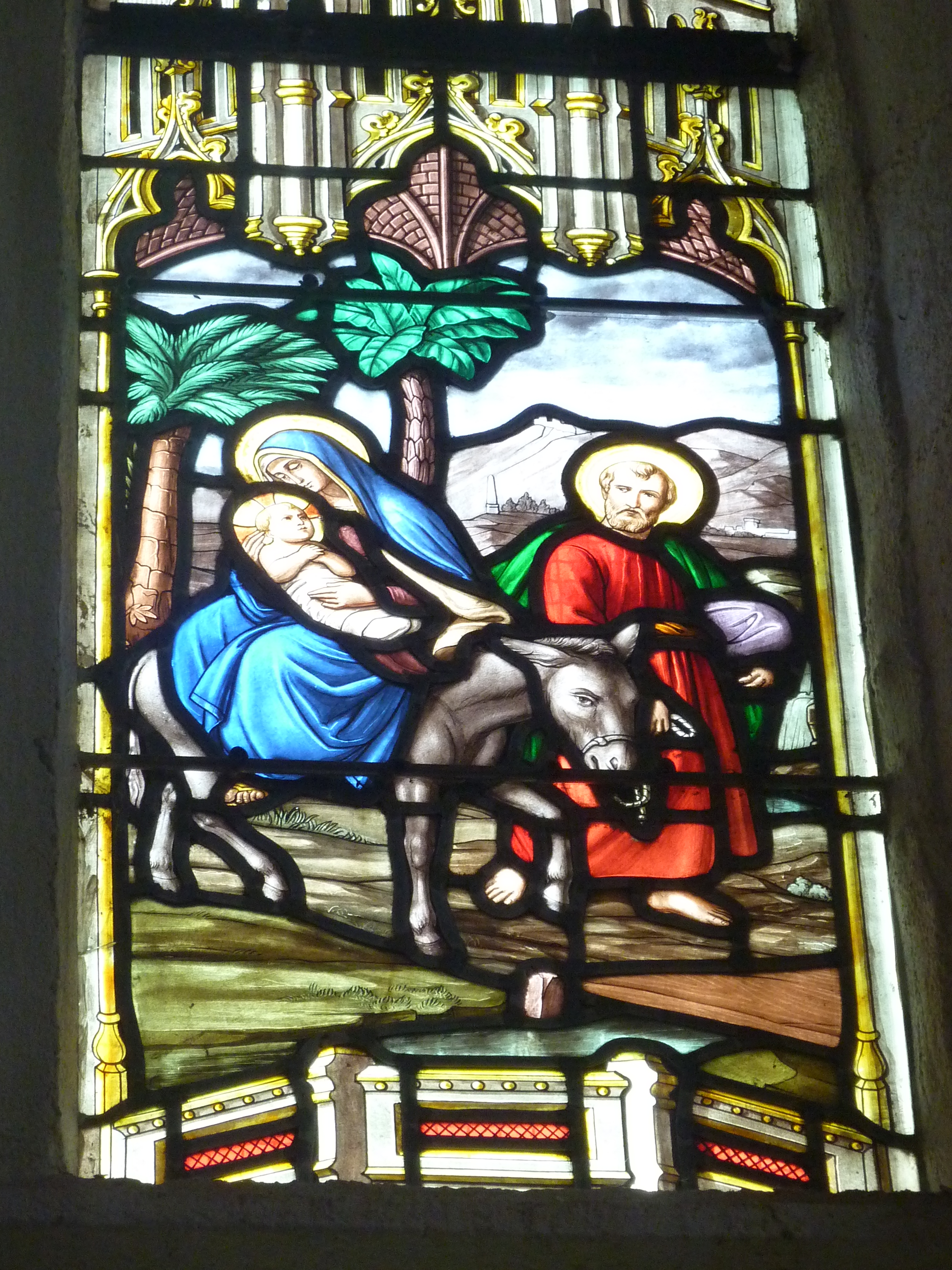
Stained glass window in the église Notre-Dame de l'Assomption, "La Fuite en Egypte"-The flight into Egypt.

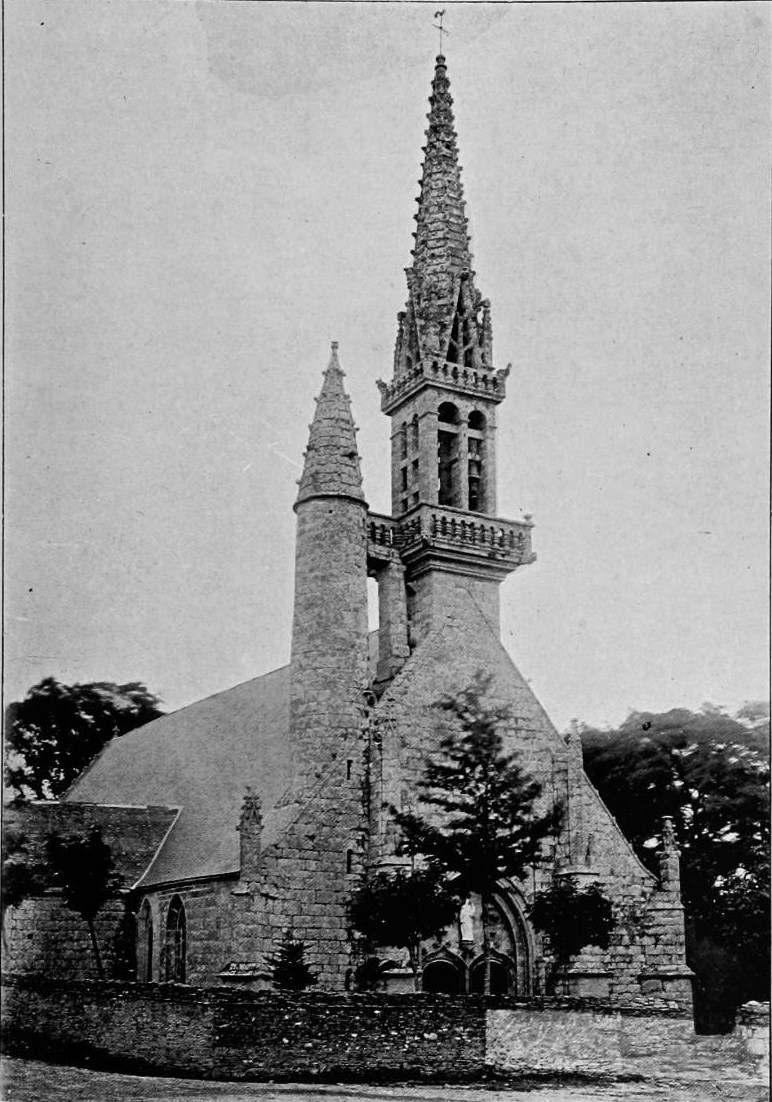
The Cléden-Poher parish church.

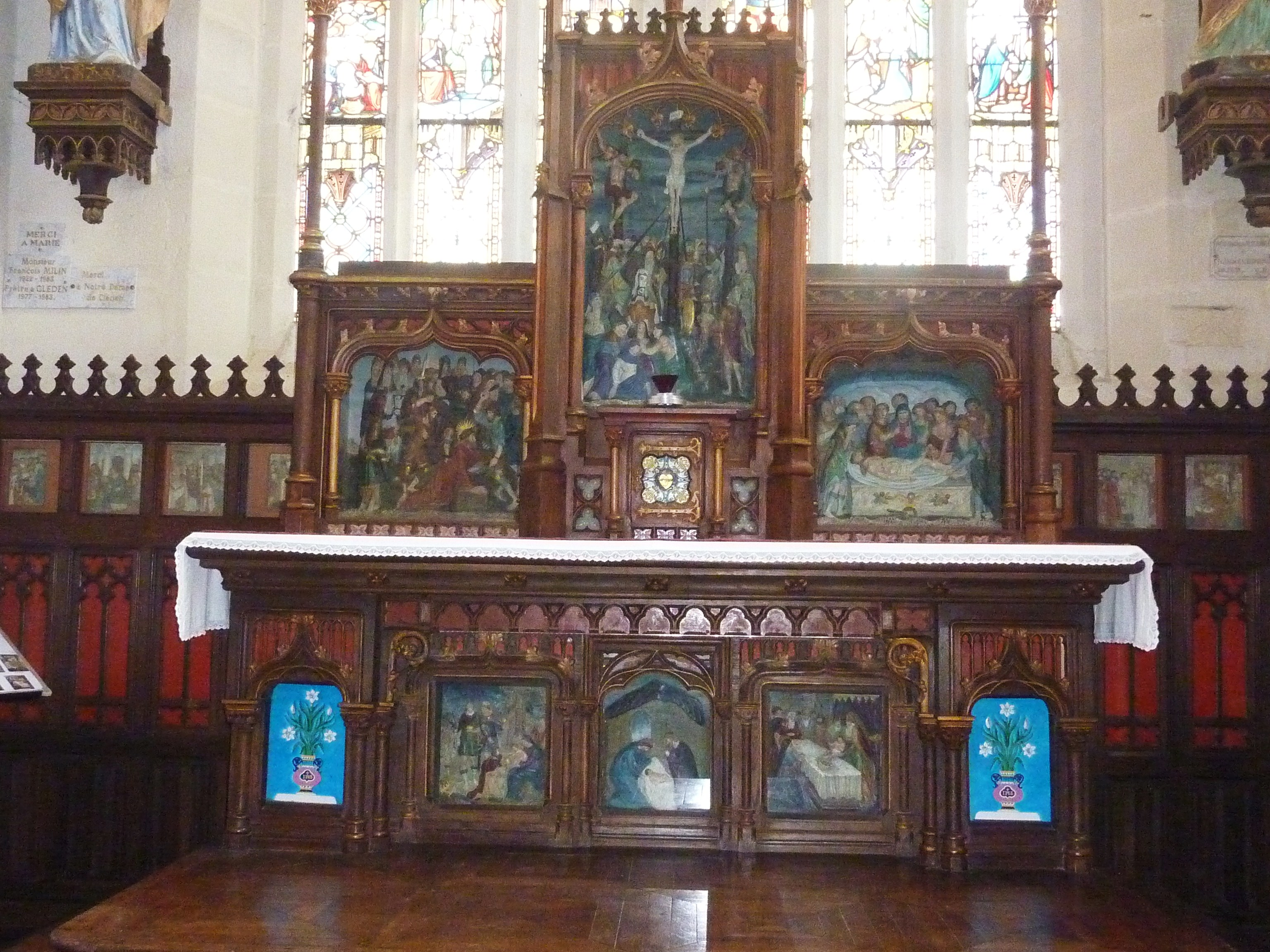
The main altar.

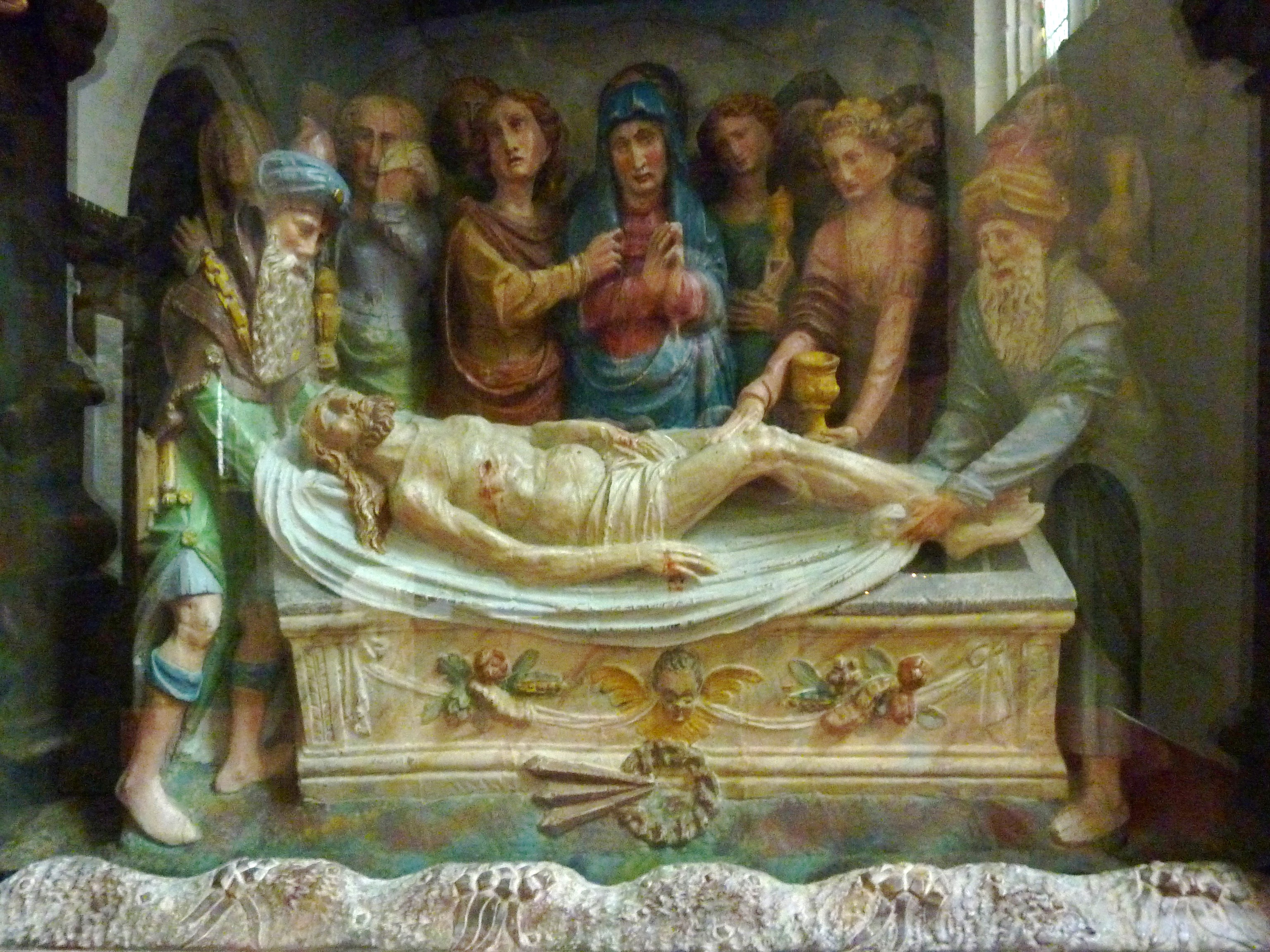
The "mise au tombeau" part of the altarpiece of the main altar.

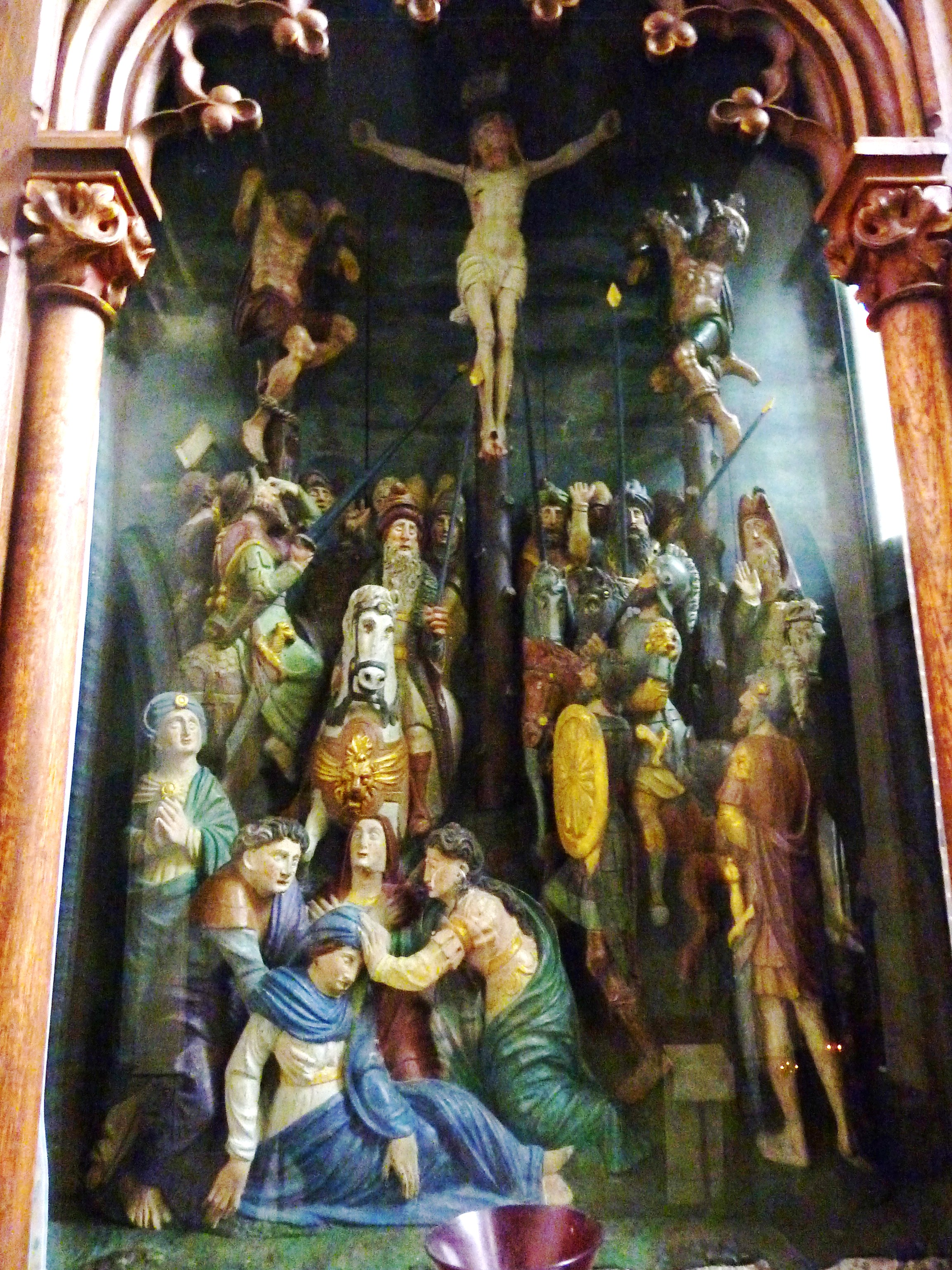
The "crucifixion" part of the altarpiece of the main altar.

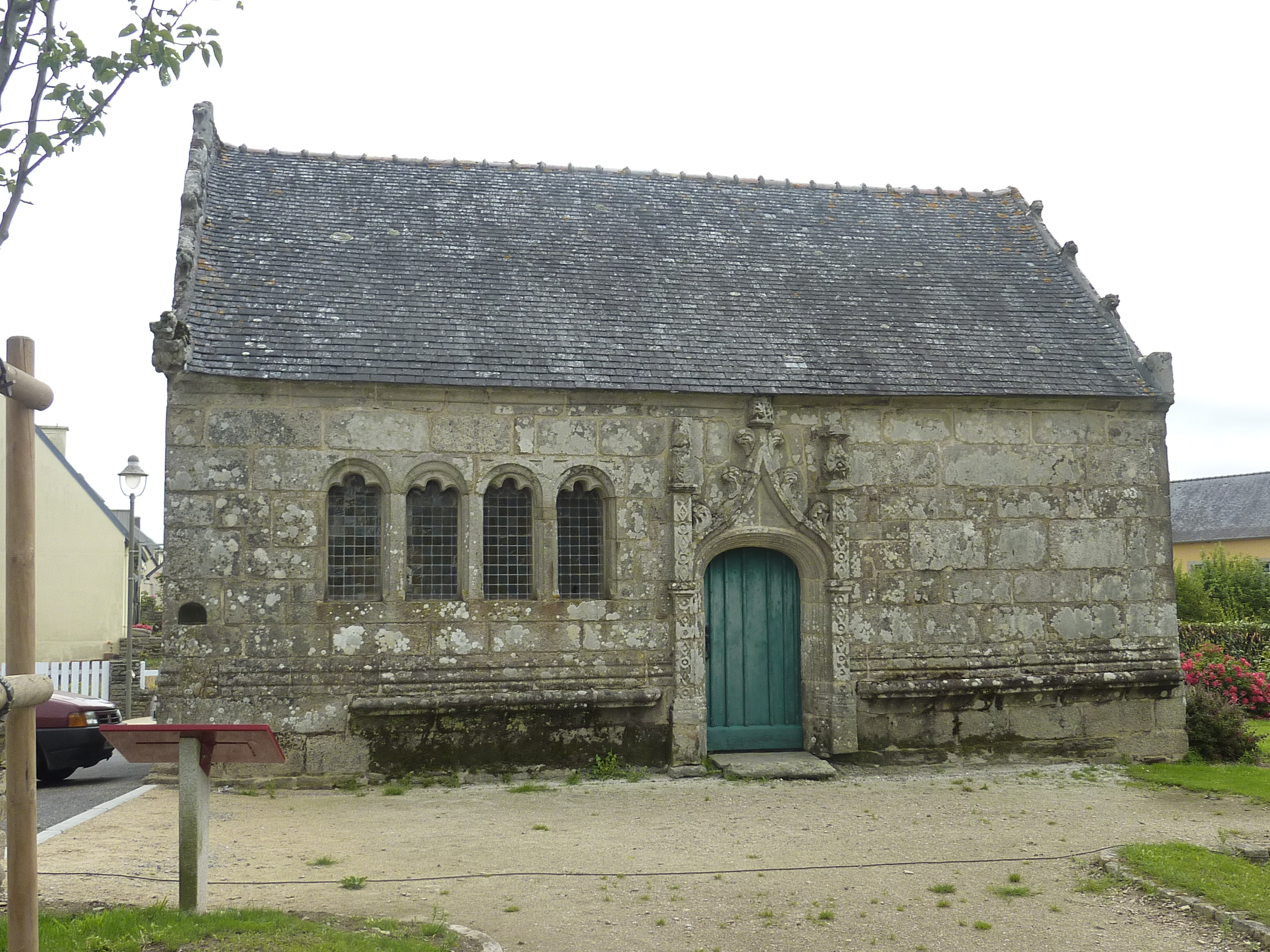
The ossuary

== See also ==
- Culture of France
- French architecture
- History of France
- Religion in France
- Roman Catholicism in France
