= Lampaul-Guimiliau =

Lampaul-Guimiliau Lambaol-Gwimilio
- Commune
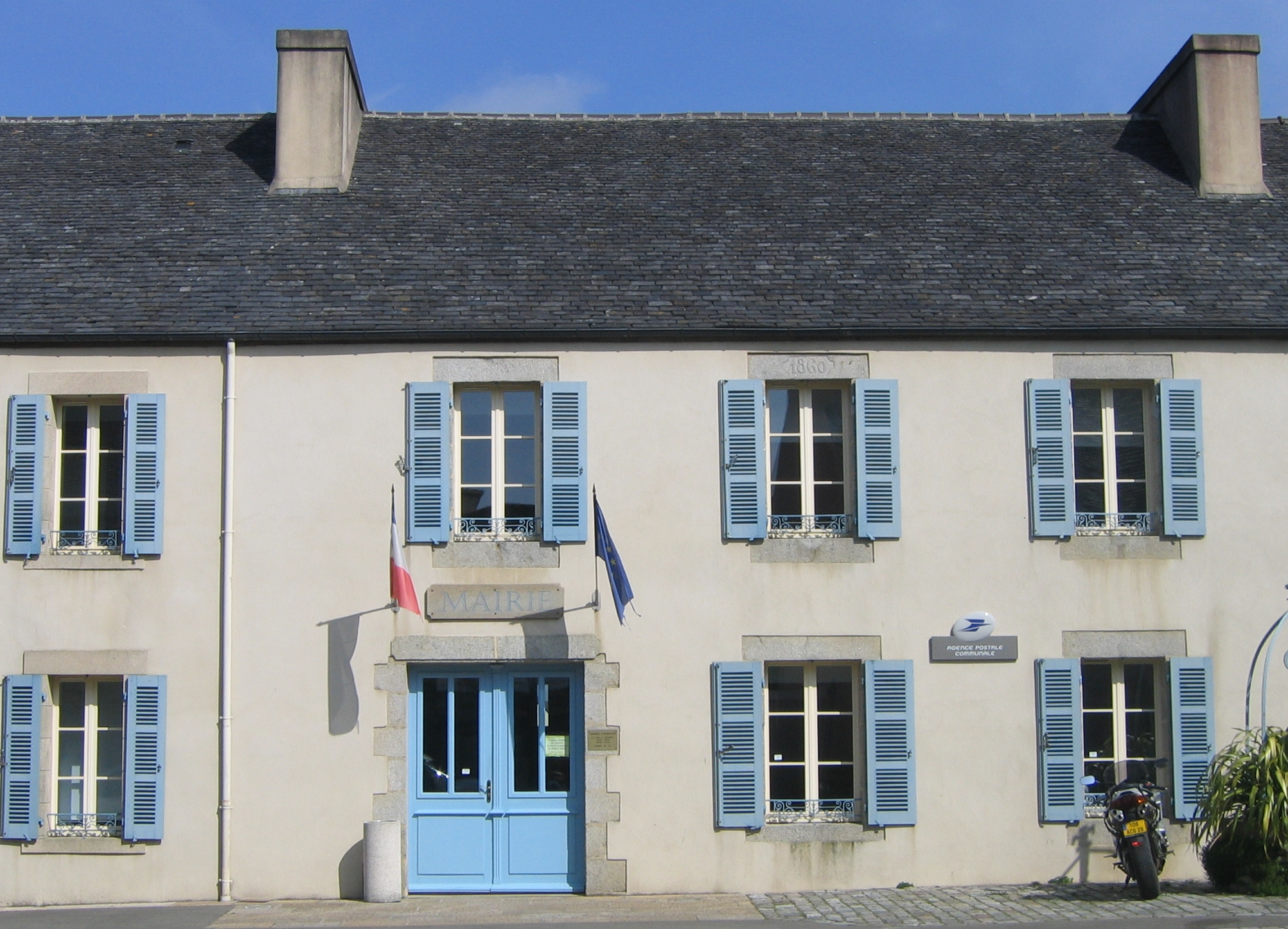
- Town hall

- Coat of arms
- Location of Lampaul-Guimiliau
- Location within France Location within Brittany
- Coordinates: 48°29′34″N 4°02′30″W
- Country: France
- Region: Brittany
- Department: Finistère
- Arrondissement: Morlaix
- Canton: Landivisiau
- Intercommunality: Pays de Landivisiau

Government
  - Mayor (2020–2026): Jean-Yves Postec
- Area^{1}: 17.48 km^{2} (6.75 sq mi)
- Highest elevation: 172 m (564 ft)
- Lowest elevation: 39 m (128 ft)
- Population (2023): 2,032
  - Density: 116.2/km^{2} (301.1/sq mi)
- Time zone: UTC+01:00 (CET)
  - Summer (DST): UTC+02:00 (CEST)
- INSEE/Postal code: 29097 /29400
- ^{1} French Land Register data, which excludes lakes, ponds, glaciers > 1 km^{2} (0.386 sq mi or 247 acres) and river estuaries.

Lampaul-Guimiliau (French pronunciation: [lɑ̃pɔl ɡimiljo]; Breton: Lambaol-Gwimilio) is a commune in the Finistère department and administrative region of Brittany in north-western France. It is noted for its parish close.

== Etymology ==
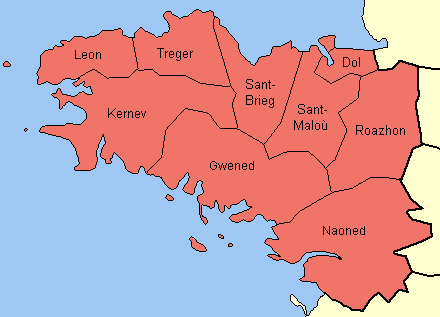
Historic dioceses of Brittany

The place name element lan or lam (llan in Welsh) originally signified an enclosure, particularly a sacred enclosure, and later came to mean a church. The name Lampaul therefore means church or enclosure dedicated to St Paulinus. St Pol (Paol, Paul, or Paulinus) was one of the seven founder saints of Brittany, a 6th-century Welsh missionary closely associated with the Léon diocese of Brittany, in which Lampaul-Guimiliau is situated. Parish closes are a distinctive feature of this diocese, although they are not entirely confined to it.

In the Middle Ages, the village was part of the parish of Guimiliau. This means township of Miliau, a Breton saint of the 6th or 9th century. Later, rising prosperity and economic growth brought separate status, with a separate parish church. Hence the name in full means St Pol's Church in the Settlement of St Miliau.

== Sights ==
=== Parish close ===
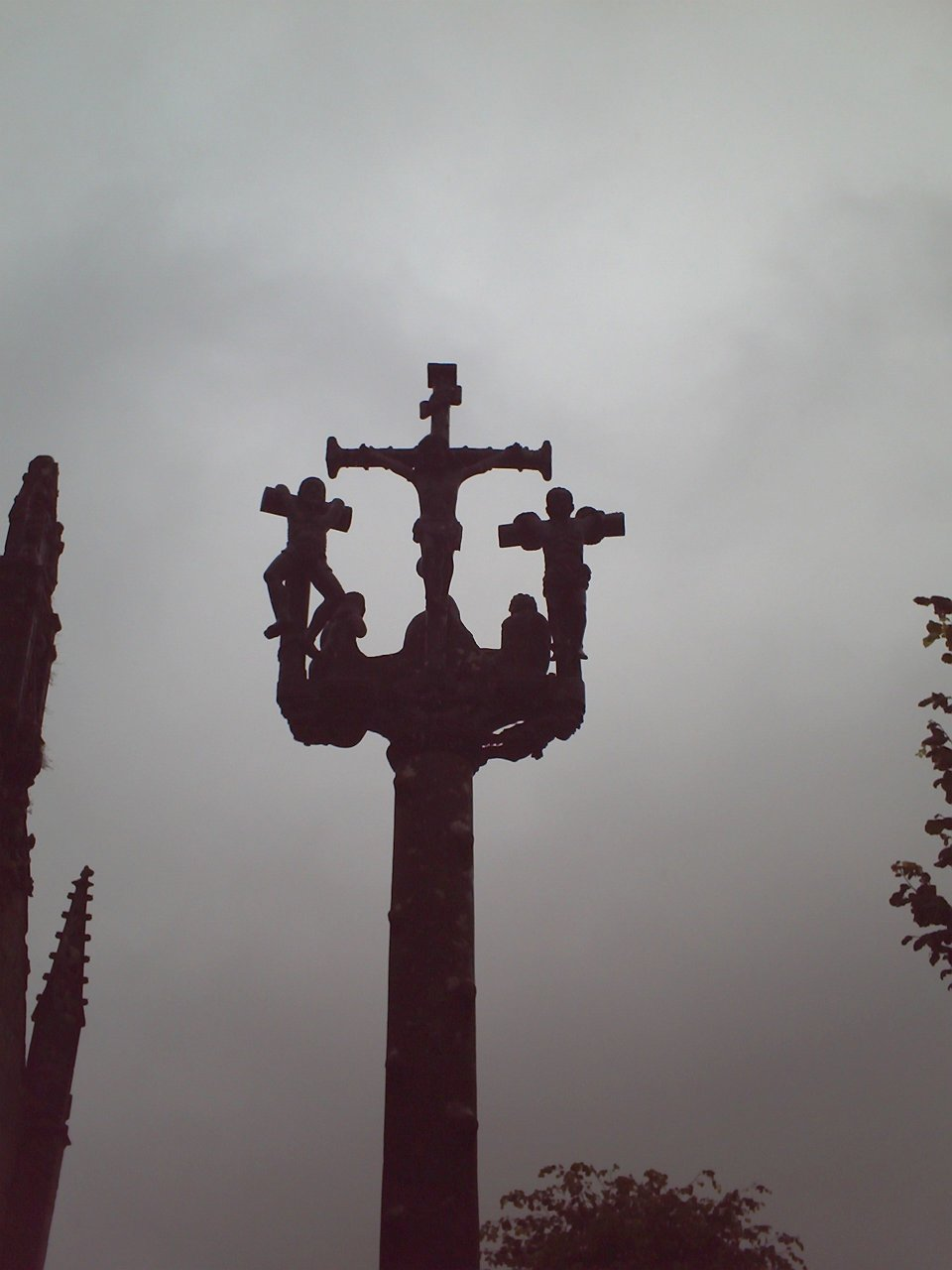
The calvary that dominates the church yard of Lampaul-Guimiliau.

Parish closes are a distinctive feature of the Breton culture of the Léon region. The close is so-called because it is a church yard entirely enclosed by a wall, with a ceremonial entrance arch. The closes of the Léon diocese date from the 16th and early 17th centuries, when the area was at the peak of its prosperity, founded on the hemp industry and on Channel and Atlantic trade.

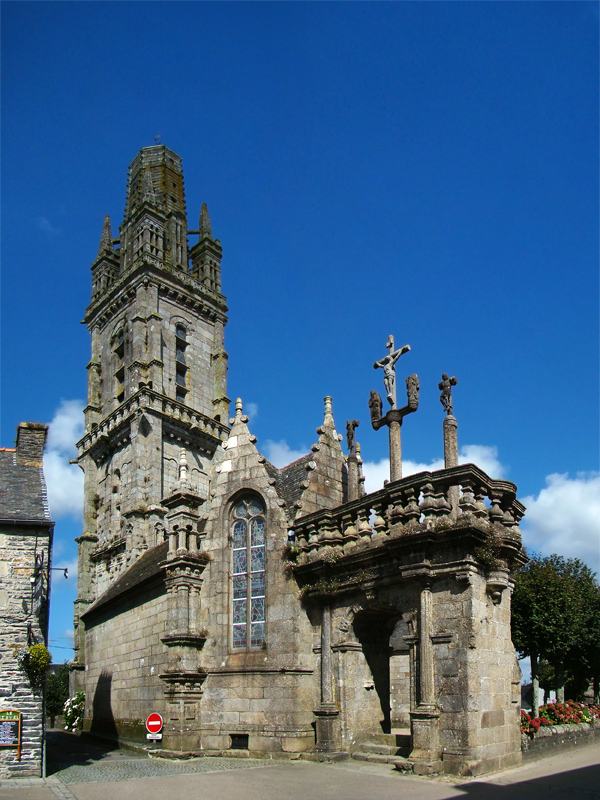
Belfry and portal.

The parish close of Lampaul-Guimiliau commands the road junction at the centre of the village. It is one of the best examples of its kind. It contains not only the church and graveyard of the parish, but also a large and elaborate calvary or crucifix and a noted charnel house, both common features of Breton closes, and a vast belfry. The church and charnel house display a large body of polychrome sculpture, mainly of 16th or 17th century date and rich in complex Christian iconography, reflecting the preoccupations of the Counter-Reformation or Catholic Reformation.

=== Belfry ===
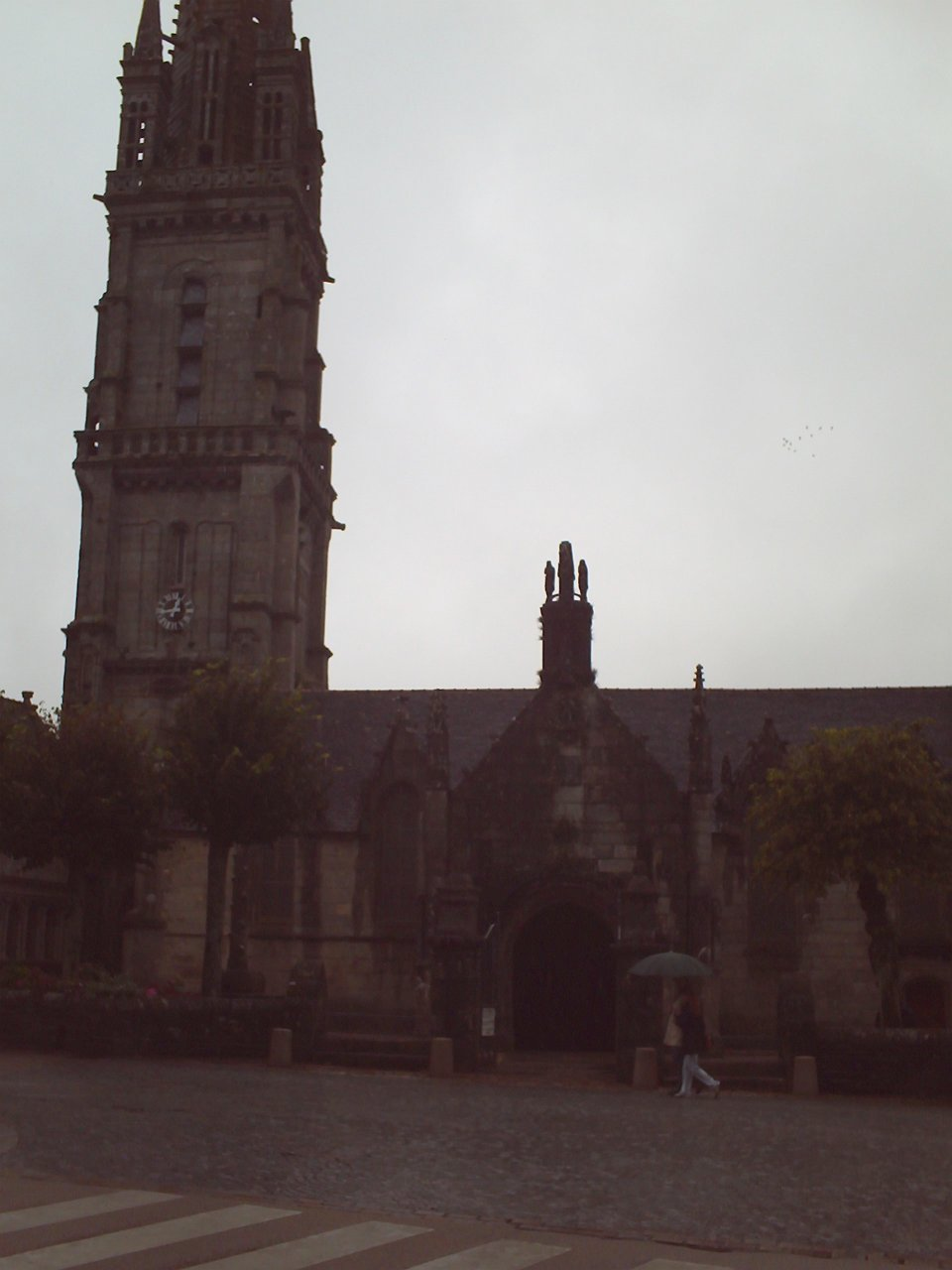
The church and belfry.

The belfry or bell tower, constructed from 1573, was originally one of the highest in Finistère. However it was truncated by fire following a lightning strike in 1809.

=== Charnel house ===
The charnel house or ossuary dates from 1667 and was designed by the architect Guillaume Kerlezroux. it is dominated by a retable portraying the Risen Christ. Formerly it also housed a notable tableau of the Entombment of Christ, which has now been moved into the church itself.

=== Polychrome interior ===
The interior of the church is replete with polychrome sculpture and decoration. Dominating the nave is a 16th-century rood screen, showing the crucified Christ, attended by the Virgin Mary and St John the Apostle. Below this, scenes of the Passion are represented in rich detail.

A number of complex retables focus on the Passion and on the lives and deeds of saints, including John the Baptist, St Margaret the Virgin, and St Lawrence. Each is divided into numerous panels, with episodes modelled in relief, and each is flanked by free-standing statuary. There are also a number of important separate free-standing pieces, including an oak Descent from the Cross, the Entombment, and St Pol.

The baptistery is one of the most striking among the parish closes. It is an octagonal Baroque concoction, dating from about 1650. Unlike most of its kind, it is elaborately polychrome, with highly-elaborate pillars and finely-modelled representation of the baptism of Christ.

The church also displays its banners. These are an important artifact of Breton culture. They form a rallying point for parishioners attending the local pilgrimage festivals, known as pardons.

=== Gallery ===
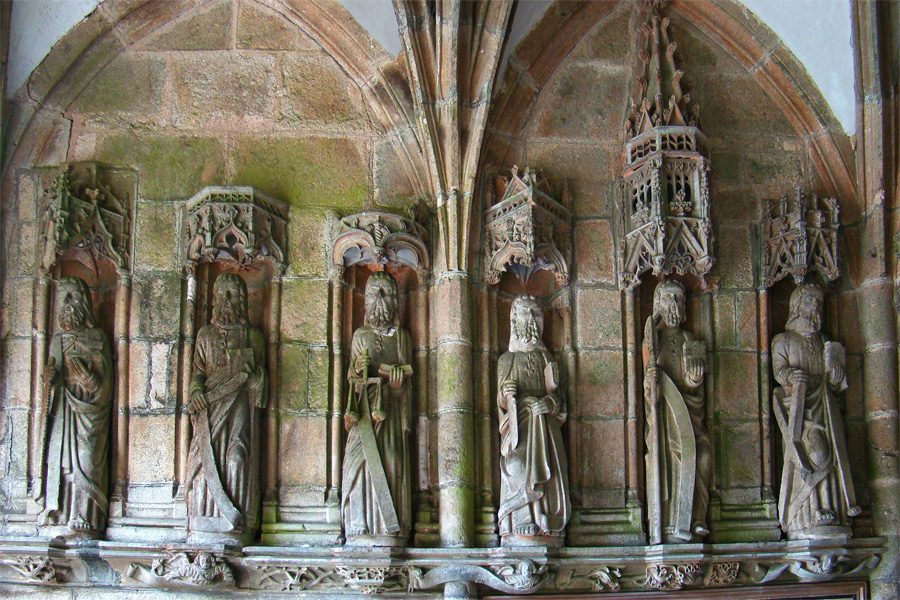
Porch left side.

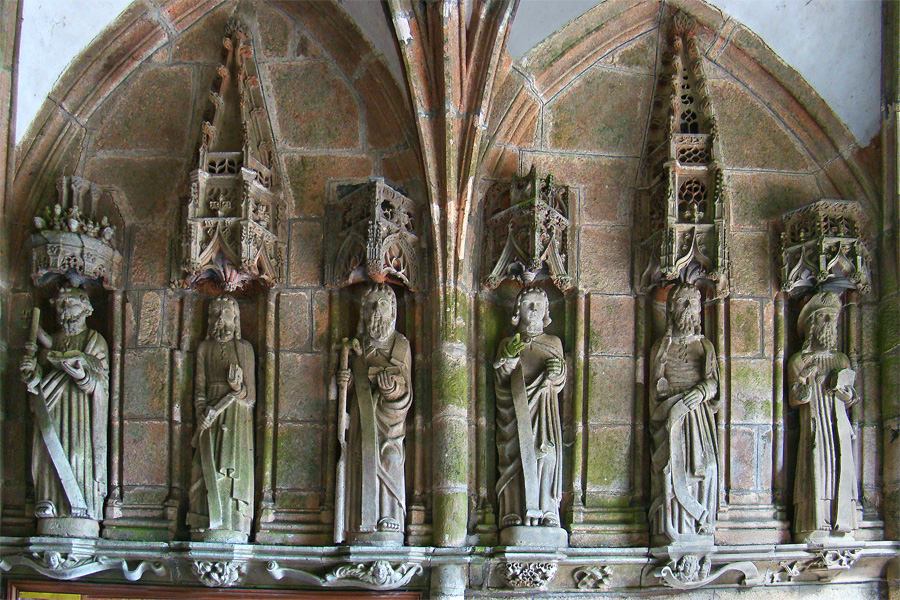
Porch right side.

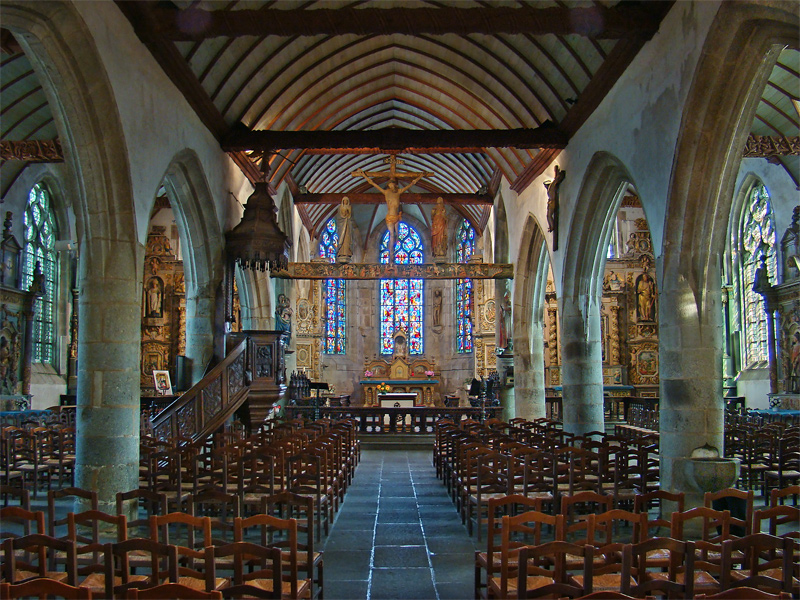
Nave and choir.

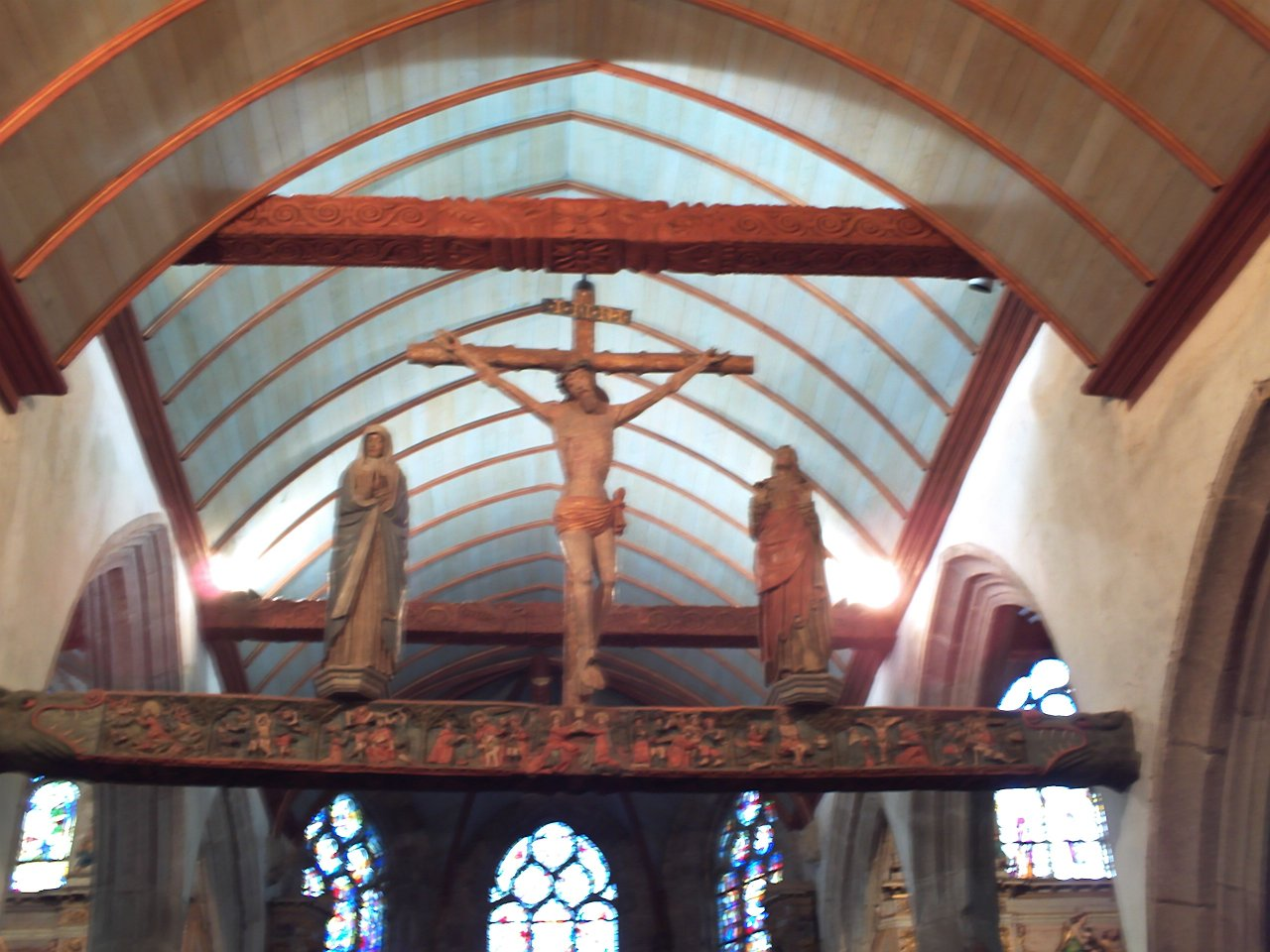
Rood screen (sixteenth century).

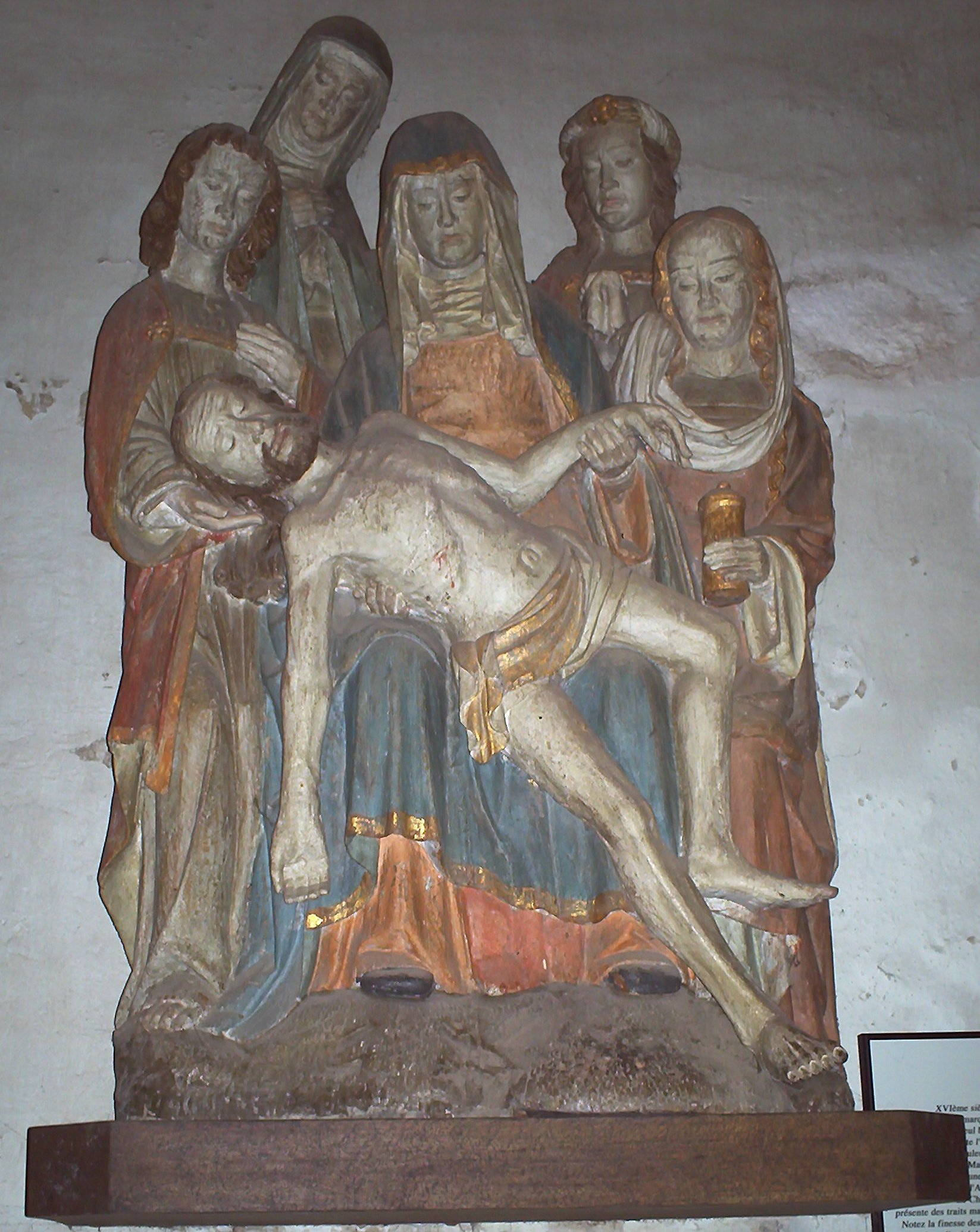
Deposition or Descent from the Cross (15th or 16th century).

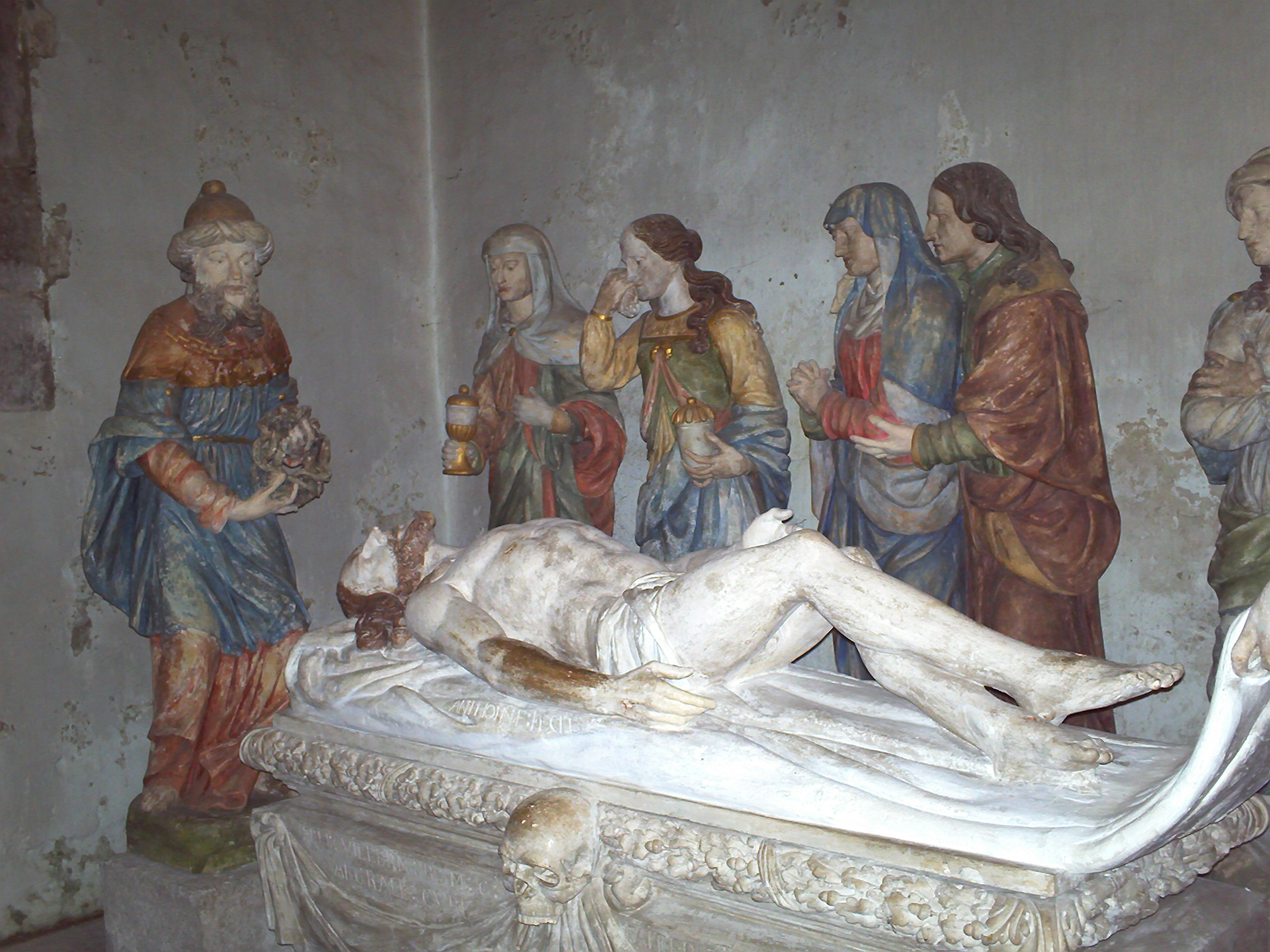
Detail of the Entombment tableau, 1676, by Antoine Chavagnac, showing Christ attended by Joseph of Arimathea, Salome, Mary Magdalene, the Virgin Mary supported by St John the Apostle, and Mary the Mother of James.

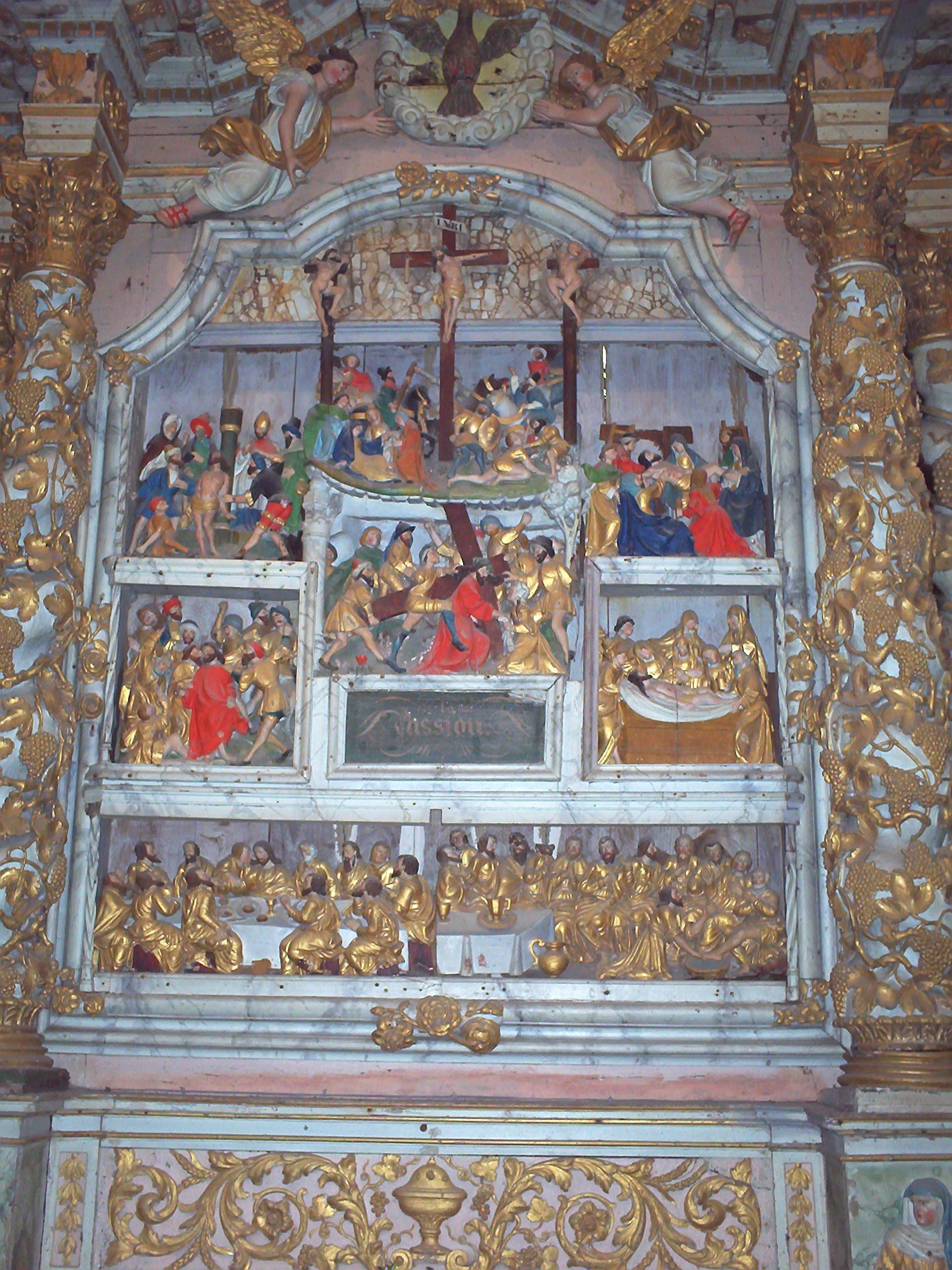
Retable of the Passion, with a representation of the Last Supper.

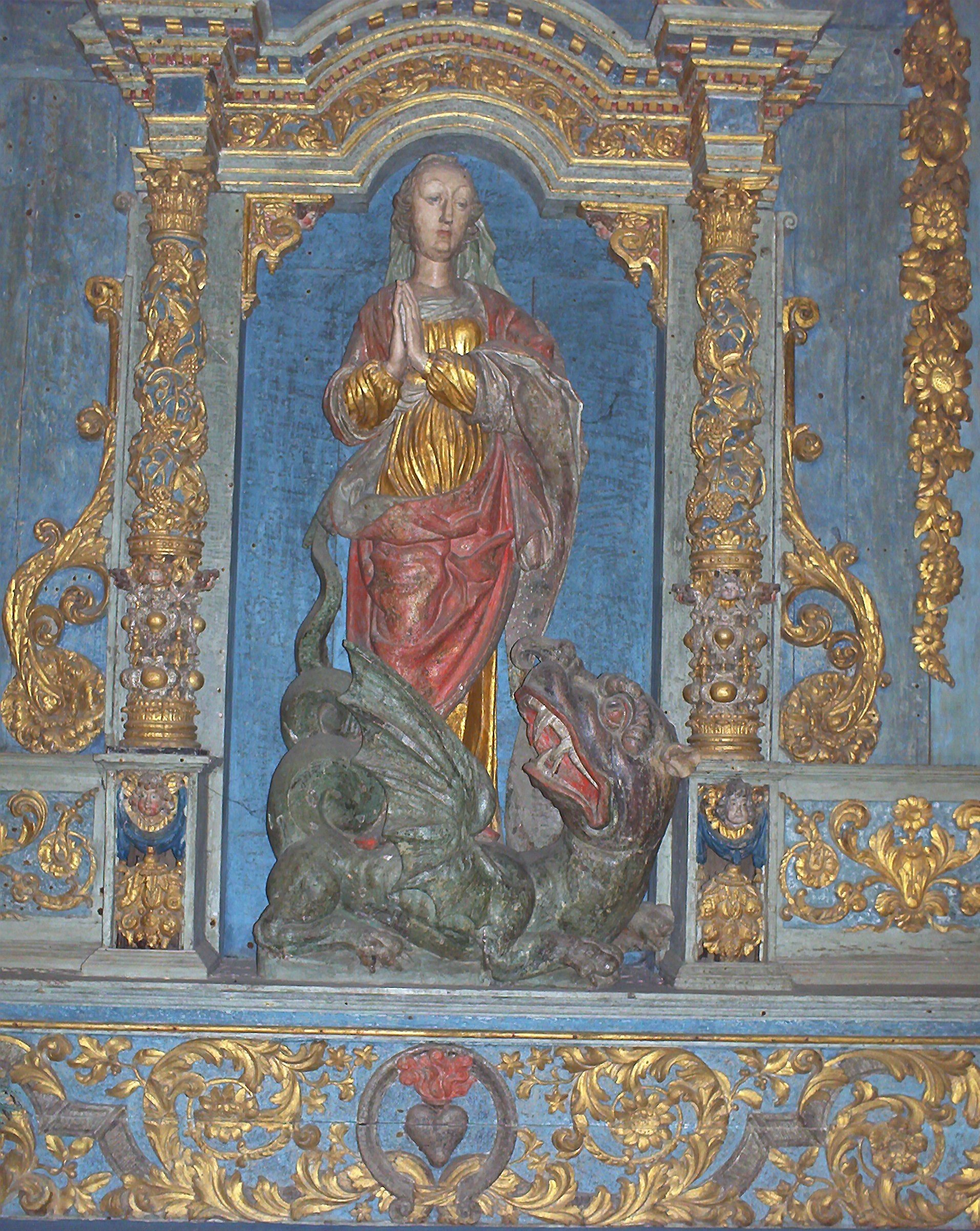
Retable of St Margaret (detail). St Margaret is shown trampling the dragon, which had previously swallowed her. She is the saint associated with pregnancy and childbirth.

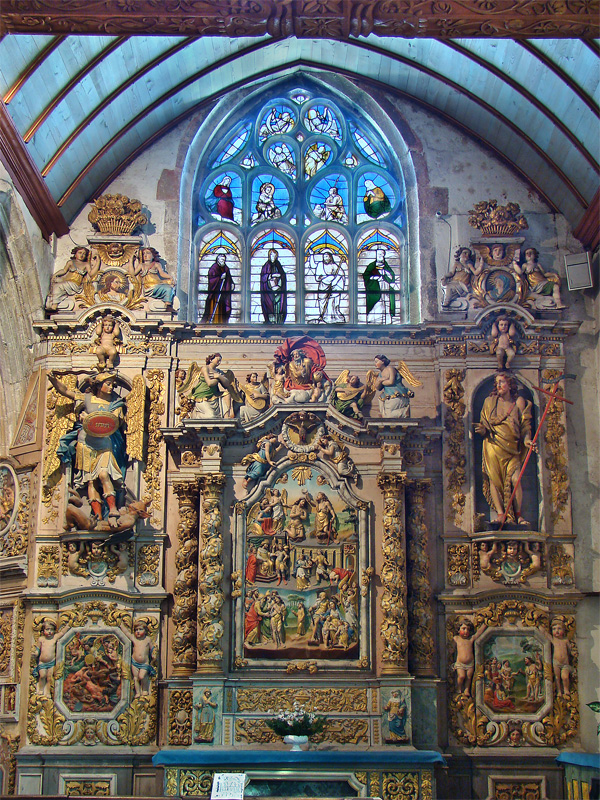
Retable of John the Baptist.

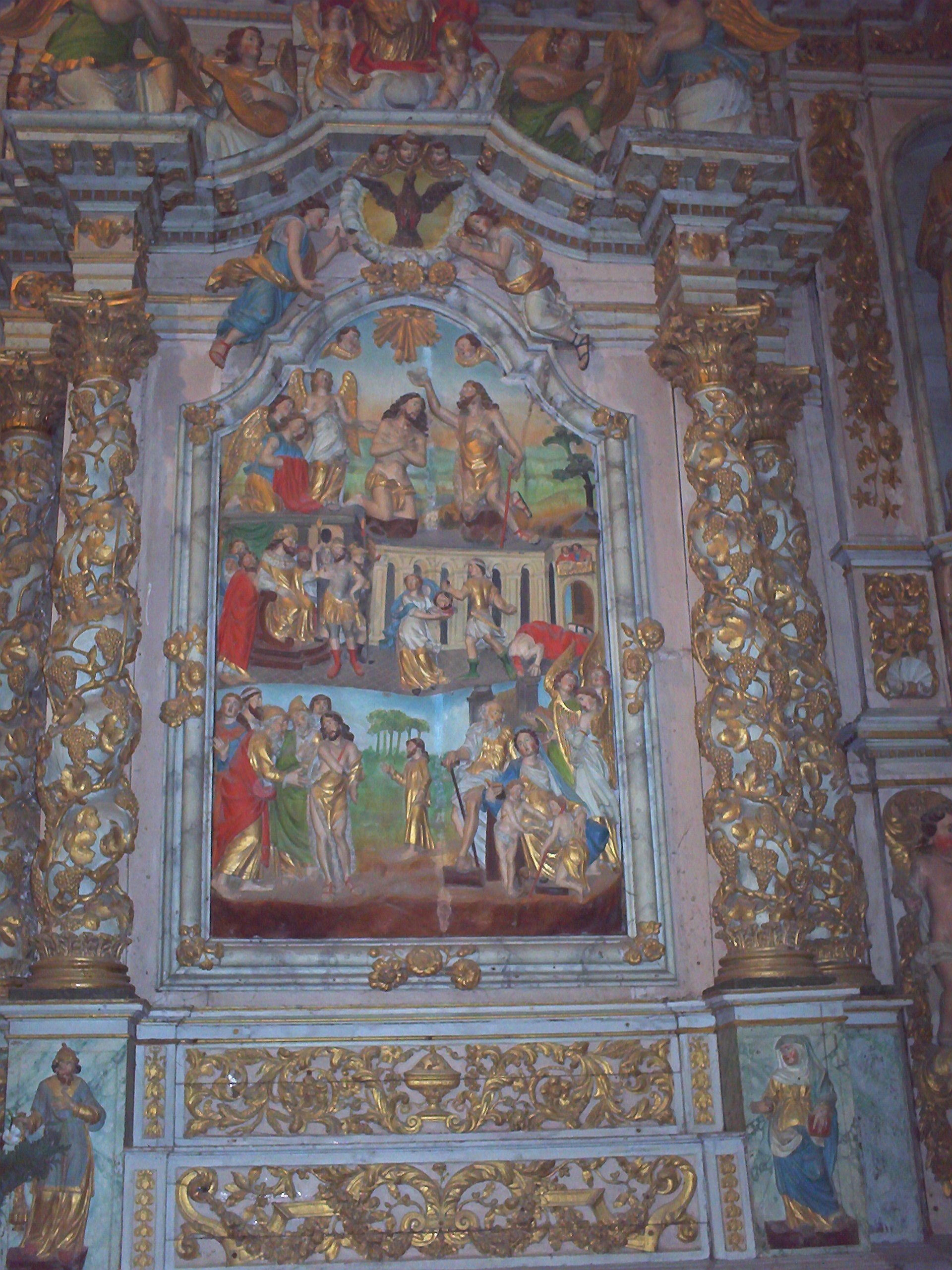
Retable of John the Baptist, showing events from his life, including the baptism of Christ, his preaching in the desert and Salome bearing his severed head.

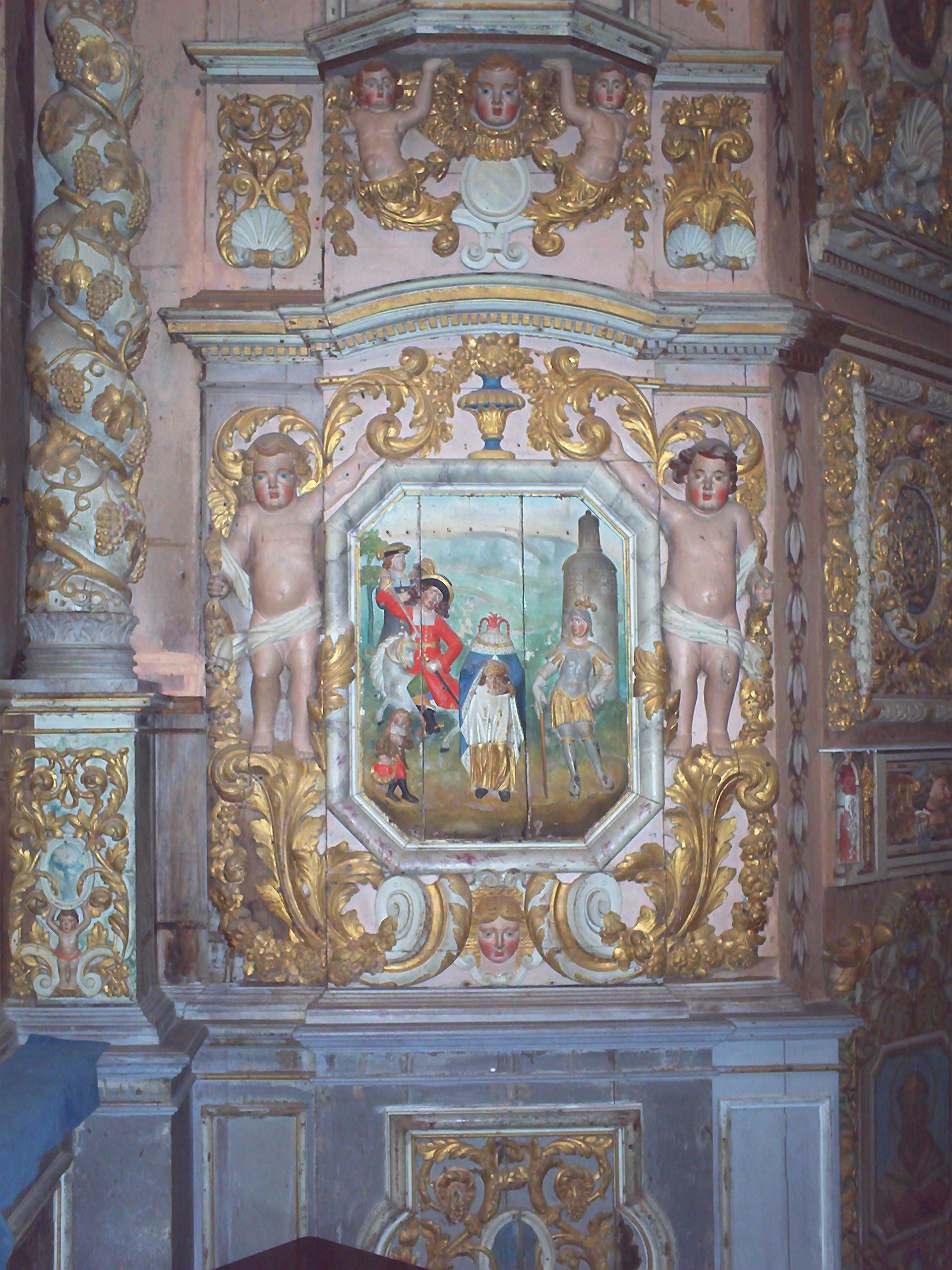
Detail flanking the Passion retable, showing the martyrdom of St Miliau, an 8th-century Breton prince killed on his brother's orders. Miliau is portrayed here as a cephalophore.

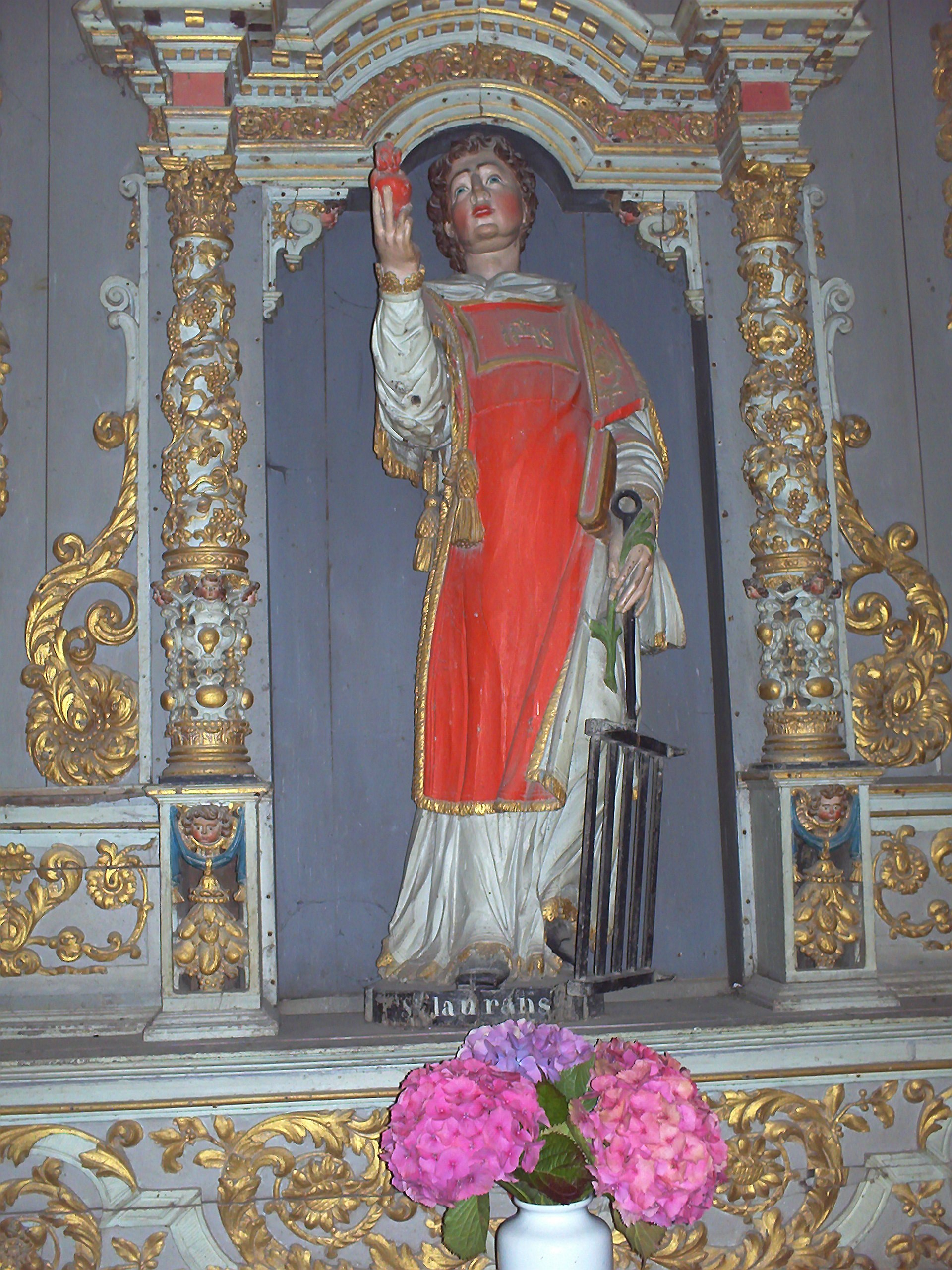
St Lawrence of Rome, a 3rd-century martyr, who, according to legend, was roasted on a grid.

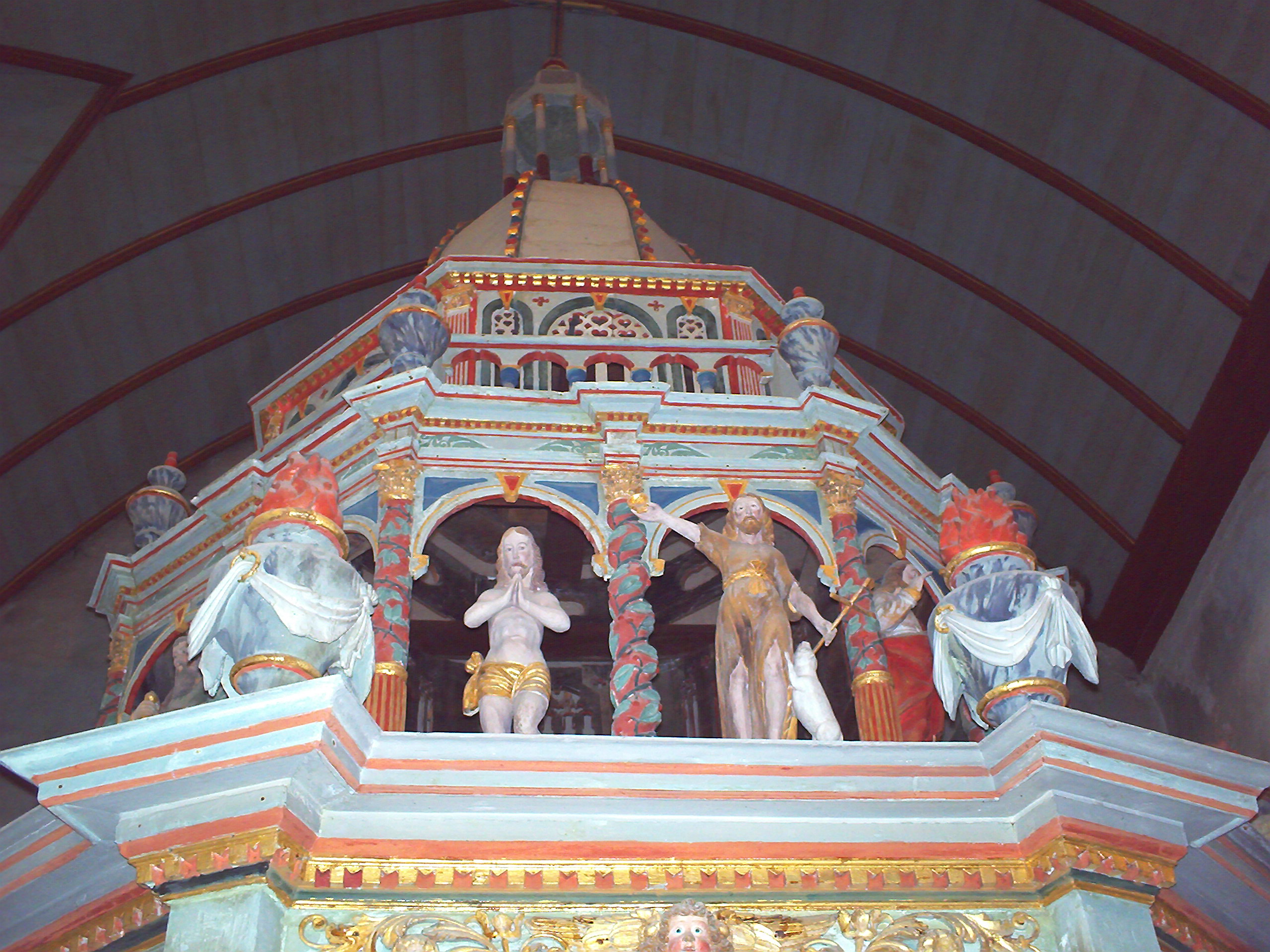
Canopy of the 17th century Baroque baptistery, portraying the baptism of Christ.

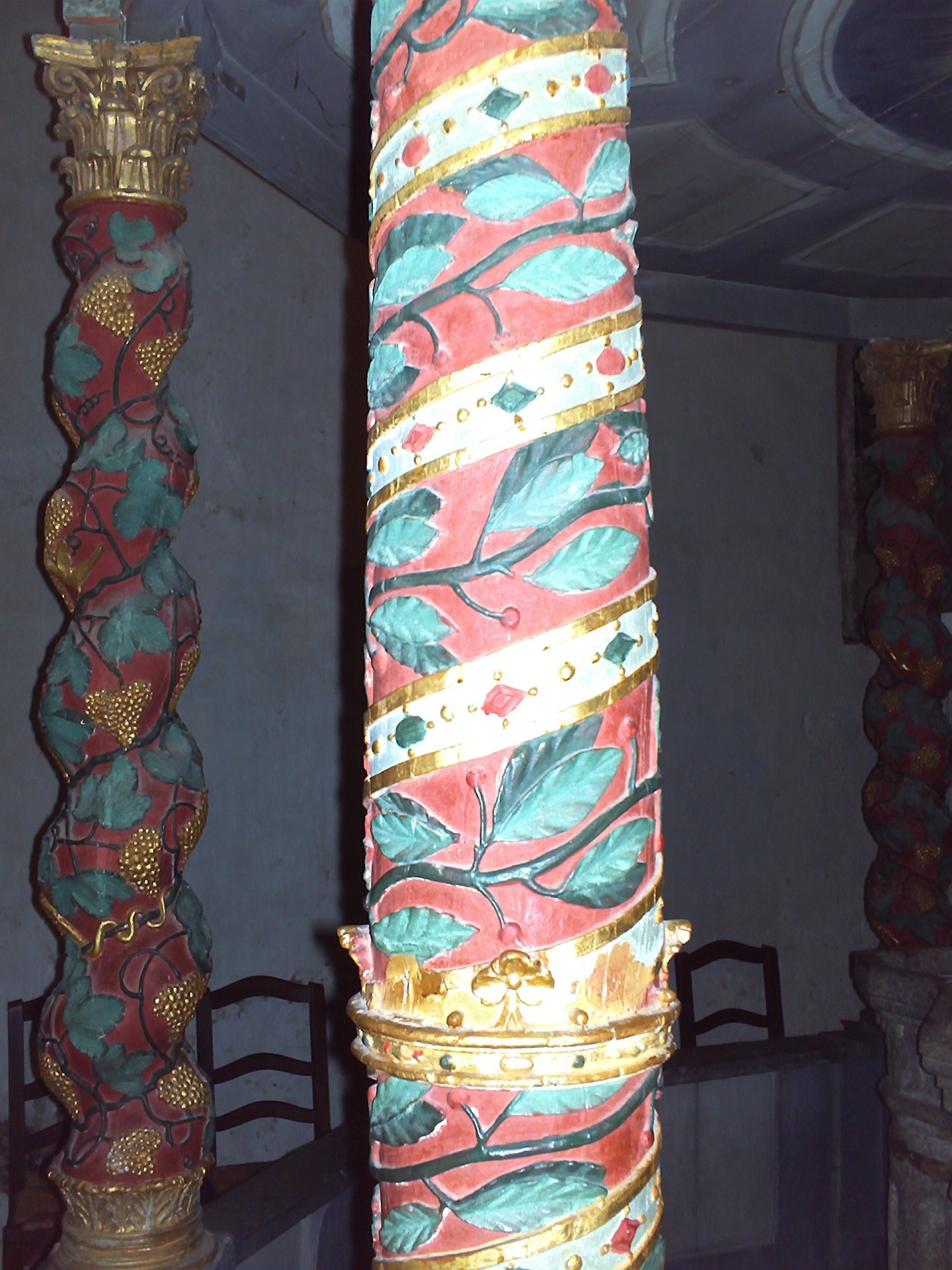
Polychrome pillars of the baptistery.

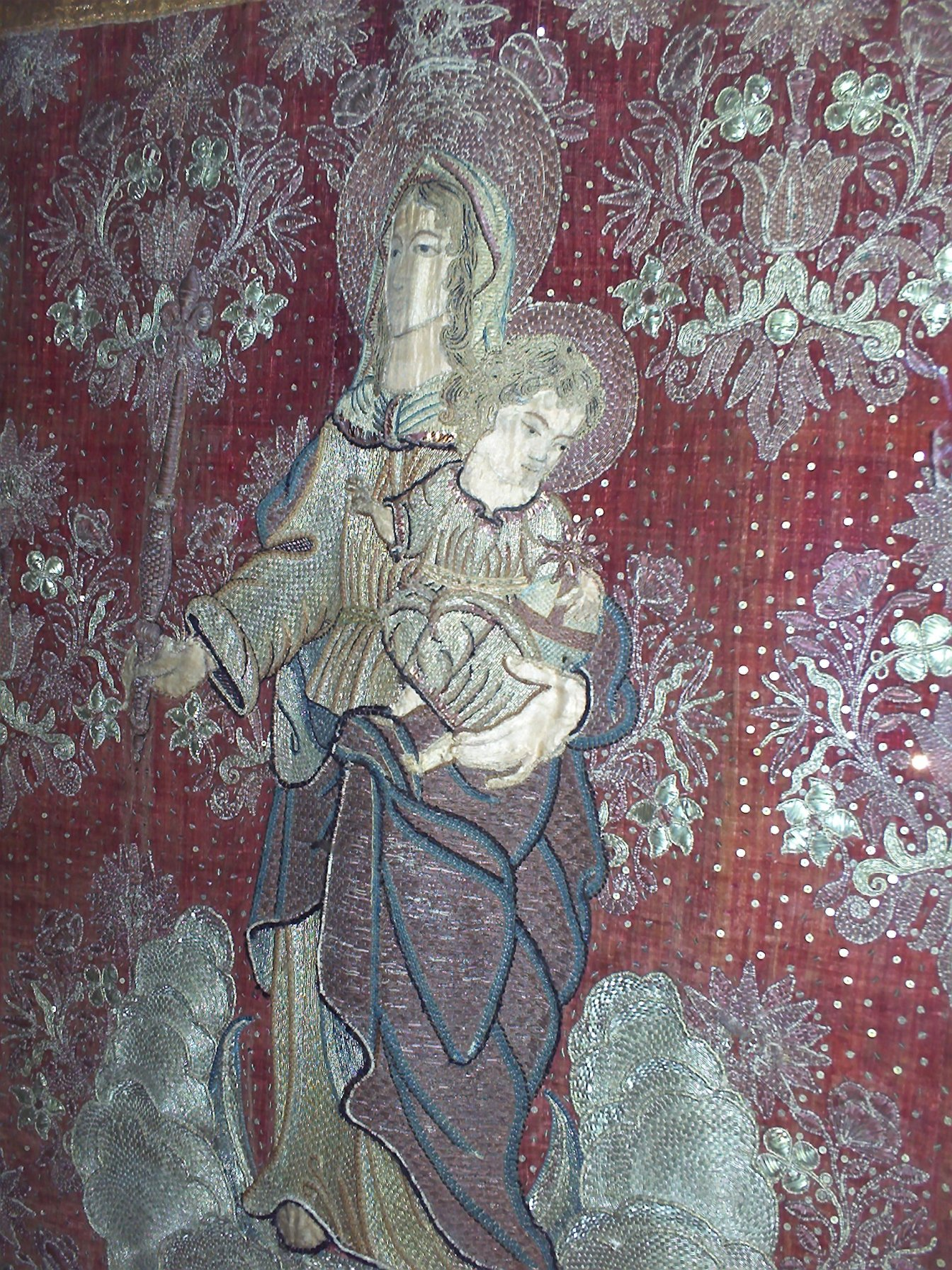
Banner of the Virgin Mary.

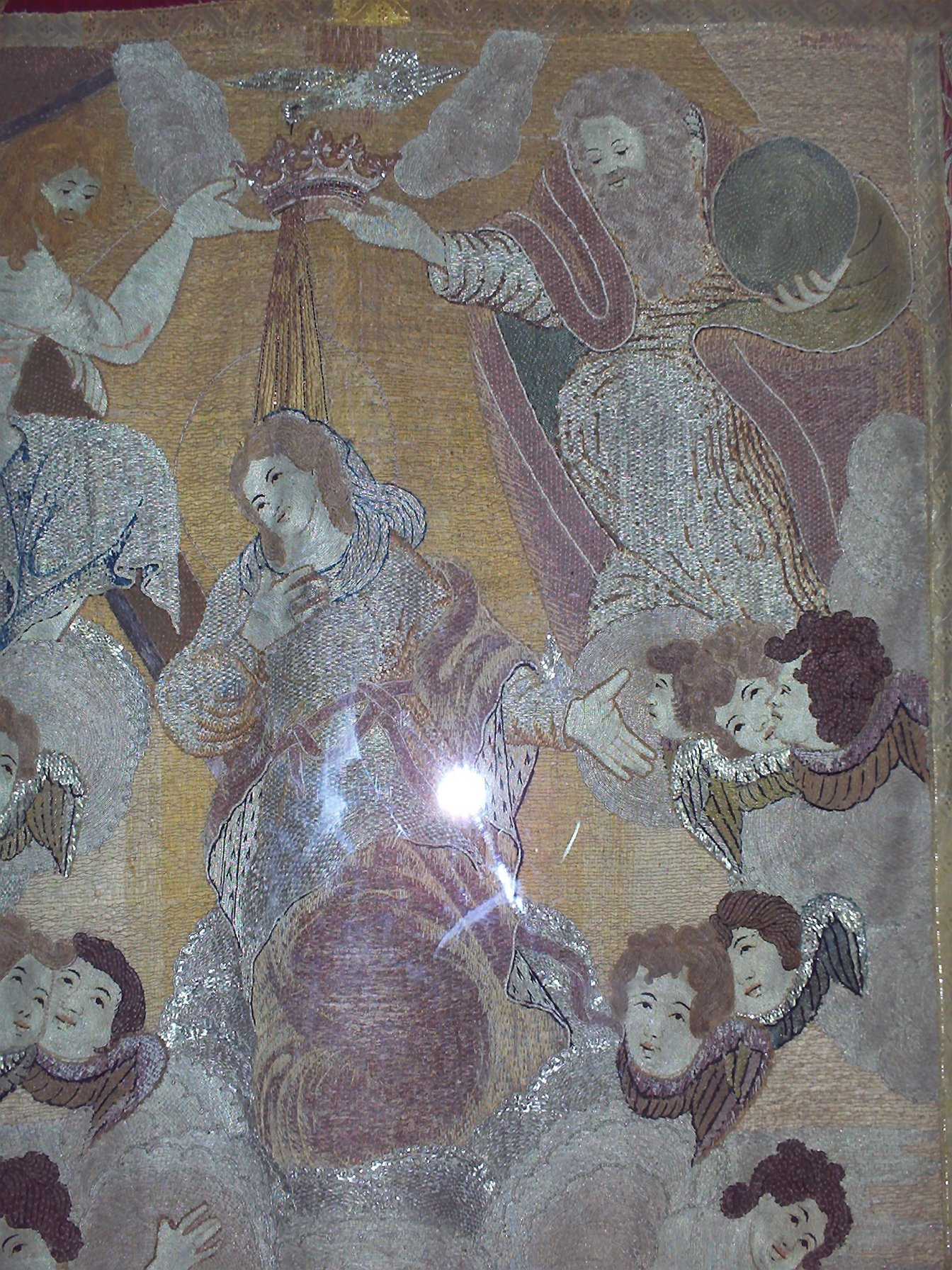
Banner of St Pol.

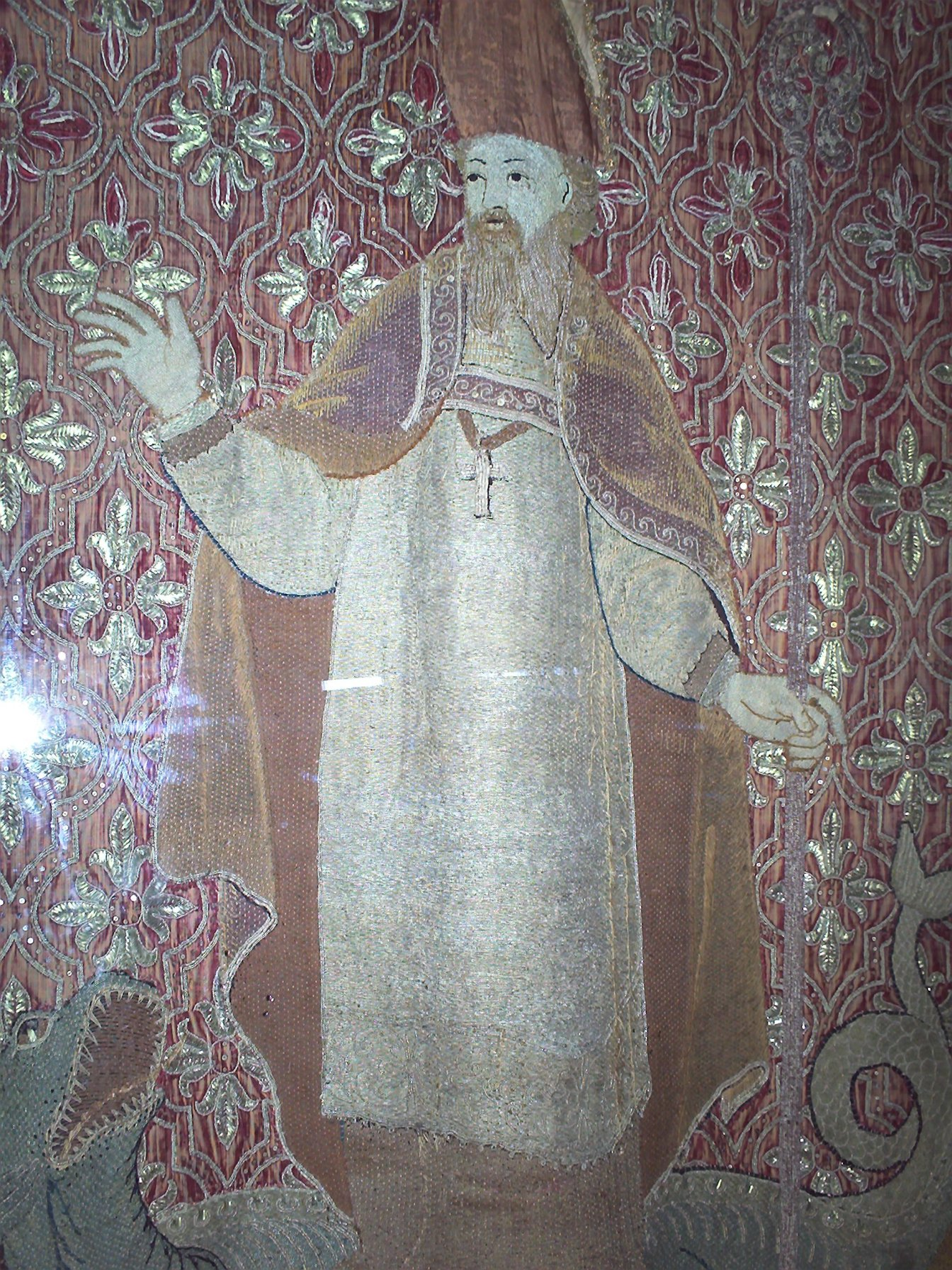
Banner of St Pol.

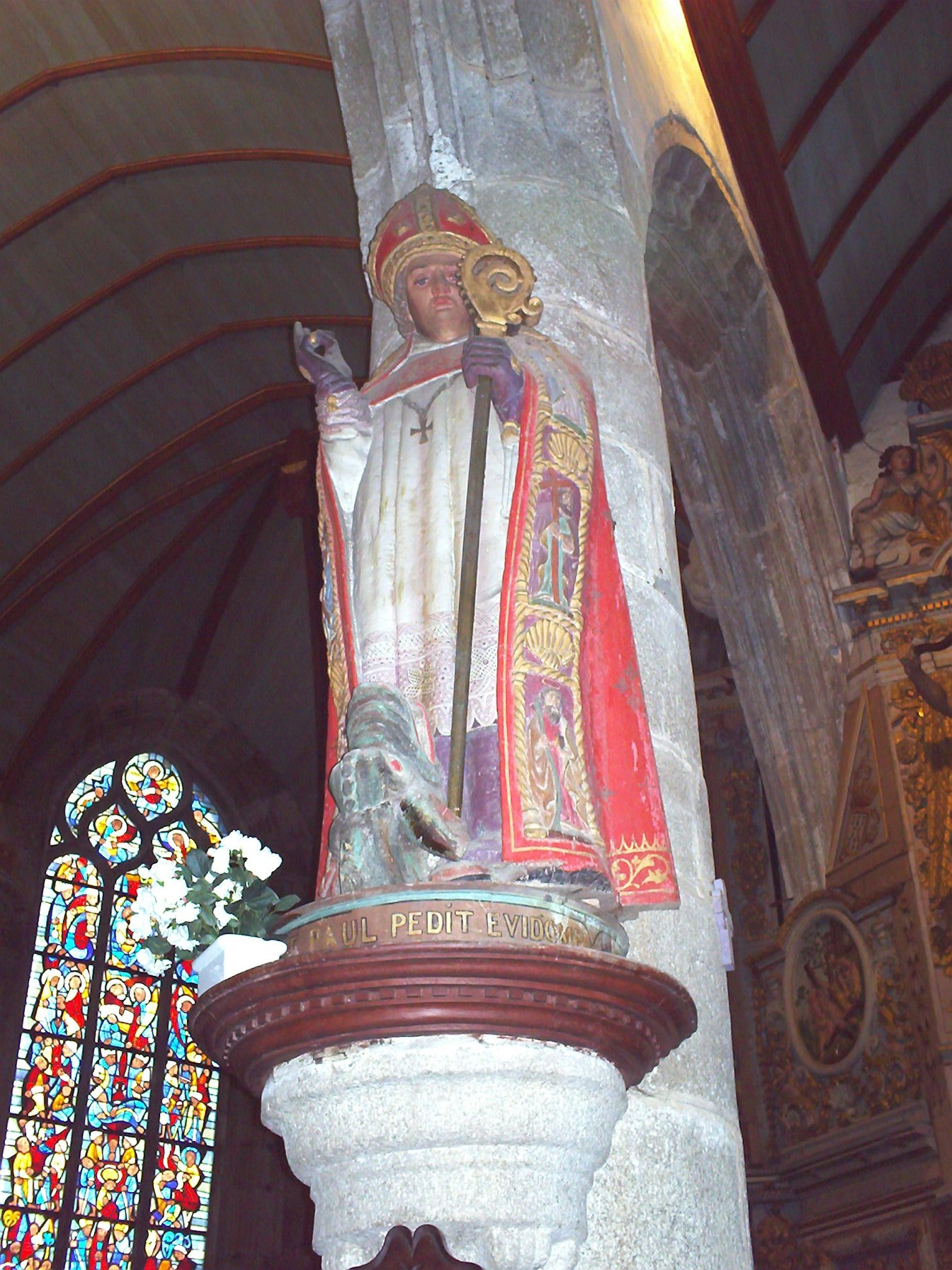
St Pol, pictured anachronistically in the garb of a 17th-century bishop.

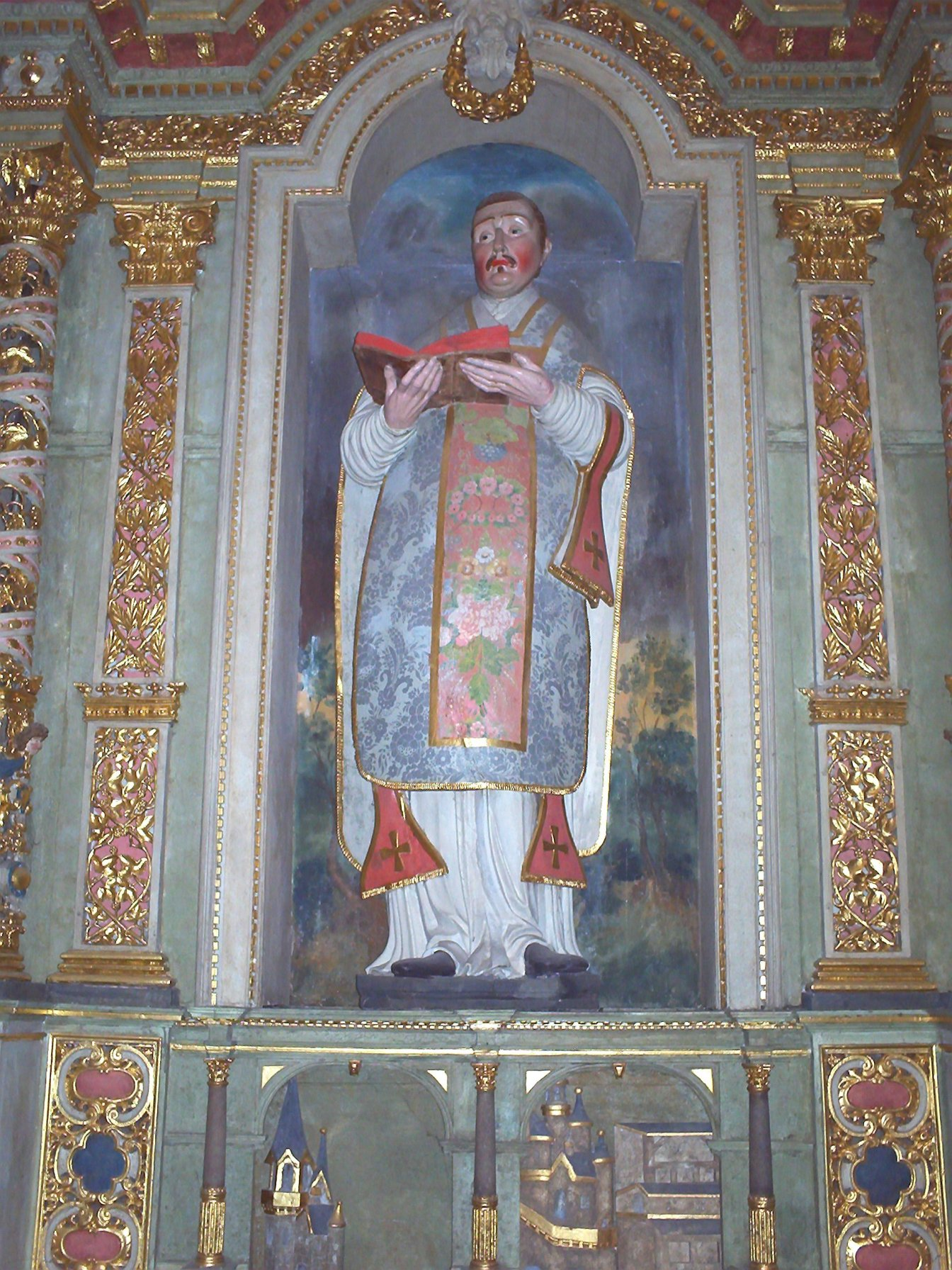
St Ives or Yves, associated with lawyers and a champion of the poor, a popular 13th century Breton saint.

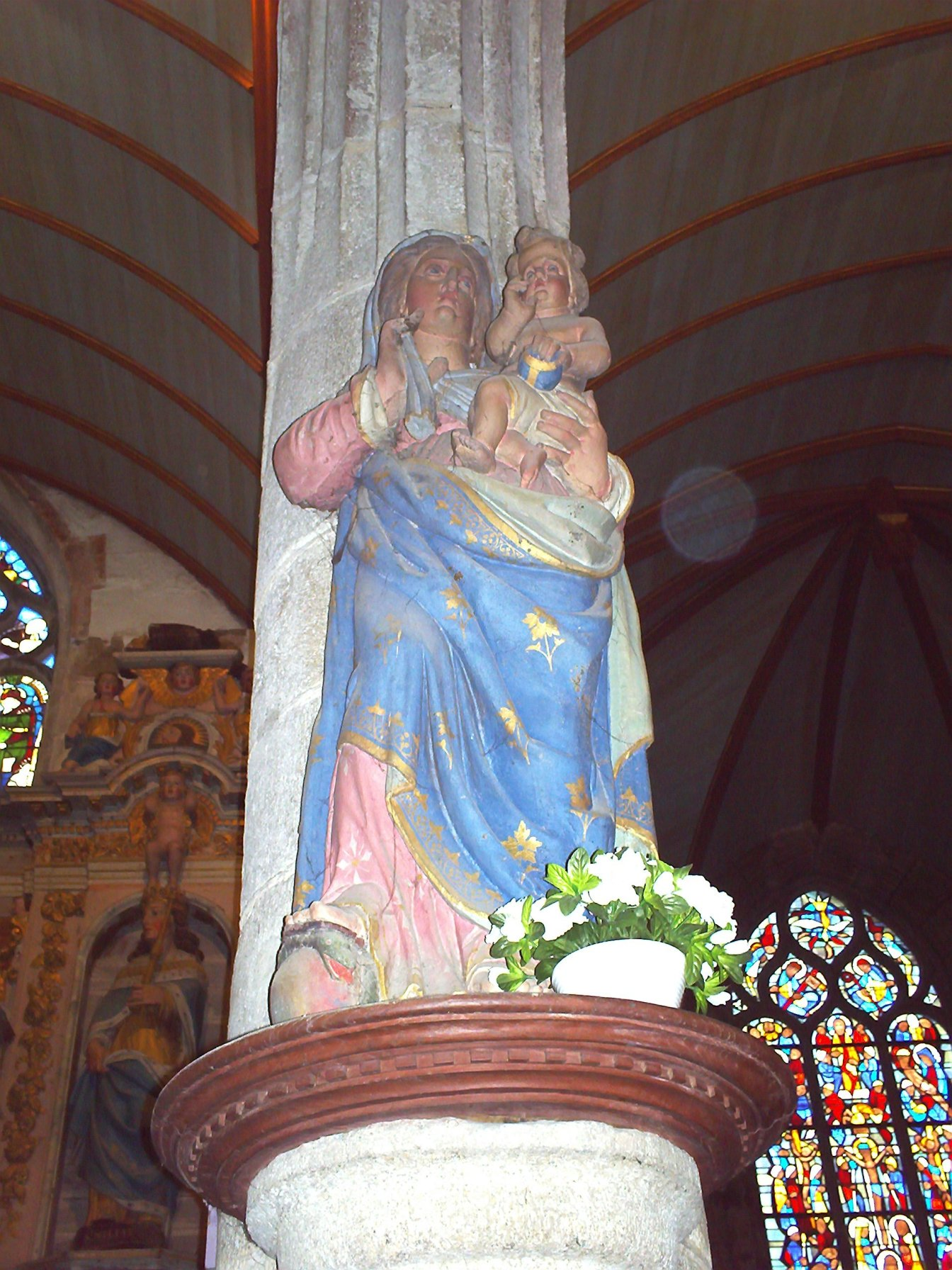
Madonna and Child: the Virgin Mary with the Infant Jesus.

== Population ==
In French the inhabitants of Lampaul-Guimiliau are known as Lampaulais.

Historical population

Year	Pop.	±% p.a.
1793	1,988	—
1800	2,010	+0.16%
1806	2,068	+0.48%
1821	2,249	+0.56%
1831	2,443	+0.83%
1836	2,482	+0.32%
1841	2,496	+0.11%
1846	2,558	+0.49%
1851	2,455	−0.82%
1856	2,370	−0.70%
1861	2,457	+0.72%
1866	2,423	−0.28%
1872	2,333	−0.63%
1876	2,427	+0.99%
1881	2,402	−0.21%
1886	2,565	+1.32%
1891	2,510	−0.43%
1896	2,307	−1.67%
1901	2,176	−1.16%

Year	Pop.	±% p.a.
1906	2,132	−0.41%
1911	2,138	+0.06%
1921	1,847	−1.45%
1926	1,719	−1.43%
1931	1,575	−1.73%
1936	1,459	−1.52%
1946	1,405	−0.38%
1954	1,232	−1.63%
1962	1,143	−0.93%
1968	1,149	+0.09%
1975	1,540	+4.27%
1982	1,973	+3.60%
1990	2,037	+0.40%
1999	1,990	−0.26%
2007	2,027	+0.23%
2012	2,057	+0.29%
2017	2,058	+0.01%
2023	2,032	−0.21%

Source: EHESS and INSEE (1968-2023)

== See also ==
- Communes of the Finistère department
- Roland Doré sculptor
