= Parish close =

French term for a parish church and churchyard

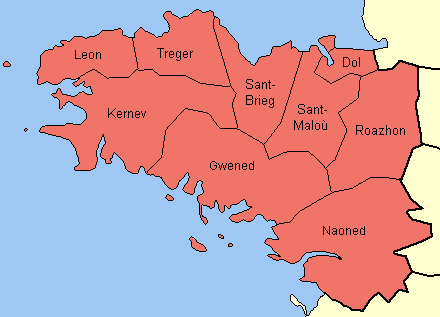
The historic dioceses of Brittany

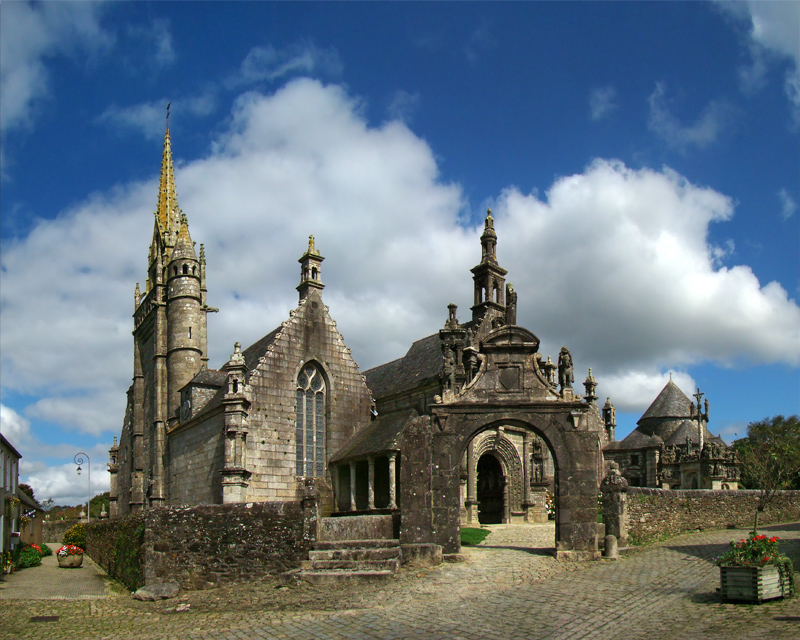
Entrance to the parish close at Guimiliau, showing the enclosing wall and gateway

Parish close is a translation of the French term enclos paroissial. It refers to a number of locations in Brittany, mainly though not exclusively in the historic diocese of Léon, corresponding roughly to the northern half of the department of Finistère. These feature an elaborately decorated parish church surrounded by an entirely walled churchyard, and date from the 16th and 17th centuries.

== The term ==
The term enclos paroissial seems self-explanatory, but can seem a false friend to the English, especially British English, reader. Cathedral closes are an important feature of urban architecture in Britain and it is easy to assume that a parish close is simply smaller but analogous. Cathedral closes include many residential and administrative buildings, as well as the church. Parish closes are entirely cultic in character. The walled churchyard surrounds only buildings and structures designed for worship – the church, the calvary, and sometimes an ossuary or charnel house.

== Origins and history ==
There is a tradition of sacred enclosures with marked boundaries (fanum) in Celtic polytheism. This reflected a pre-occupation with well-defined sacred features, particularly springs and groves. After the arrival of Christianity, many older traditions and cultural traits persisted within the new religion. The place-name element lan or llan, now taken to signify a church, originally signified an enclosure. In all Brythonic Celtic areas, there was a strong association between church enclosures and specific saints, often of a very particular local character. Whatever the persistence of older themes and styles, the parish closes of Brittany took their present form in the early modern period, over a millennium after the region was thoroughly Christianized.

A major factor in permitting the elaboration of parish closes was the relative prosperity of Finistère in the 16th century. This was built on the maritime competition and constant warfare that plagued much of Western Europe in this period. A group of parishes, just inland, benefited hugely from supplying the ports with the hemp and linen needed to rig ships, as well as food, clothing, and other supplies. This allowed them to engage in friendly civic competition with each other, constructing and embellishing closes that were displayed most effectively during the periodic pardons, which attracted pilgrims from all over Brittany and beyond.

The majority of the churches were substantially built in the 16th century and most of the calvaries are of the same period. Throughout the 17th century, the already-impressive churches were embellished with sculpture and decoration, much of it polychrome, turning them into rich and complex exhibitions of Catholic iconography, mostly Baroque in style.

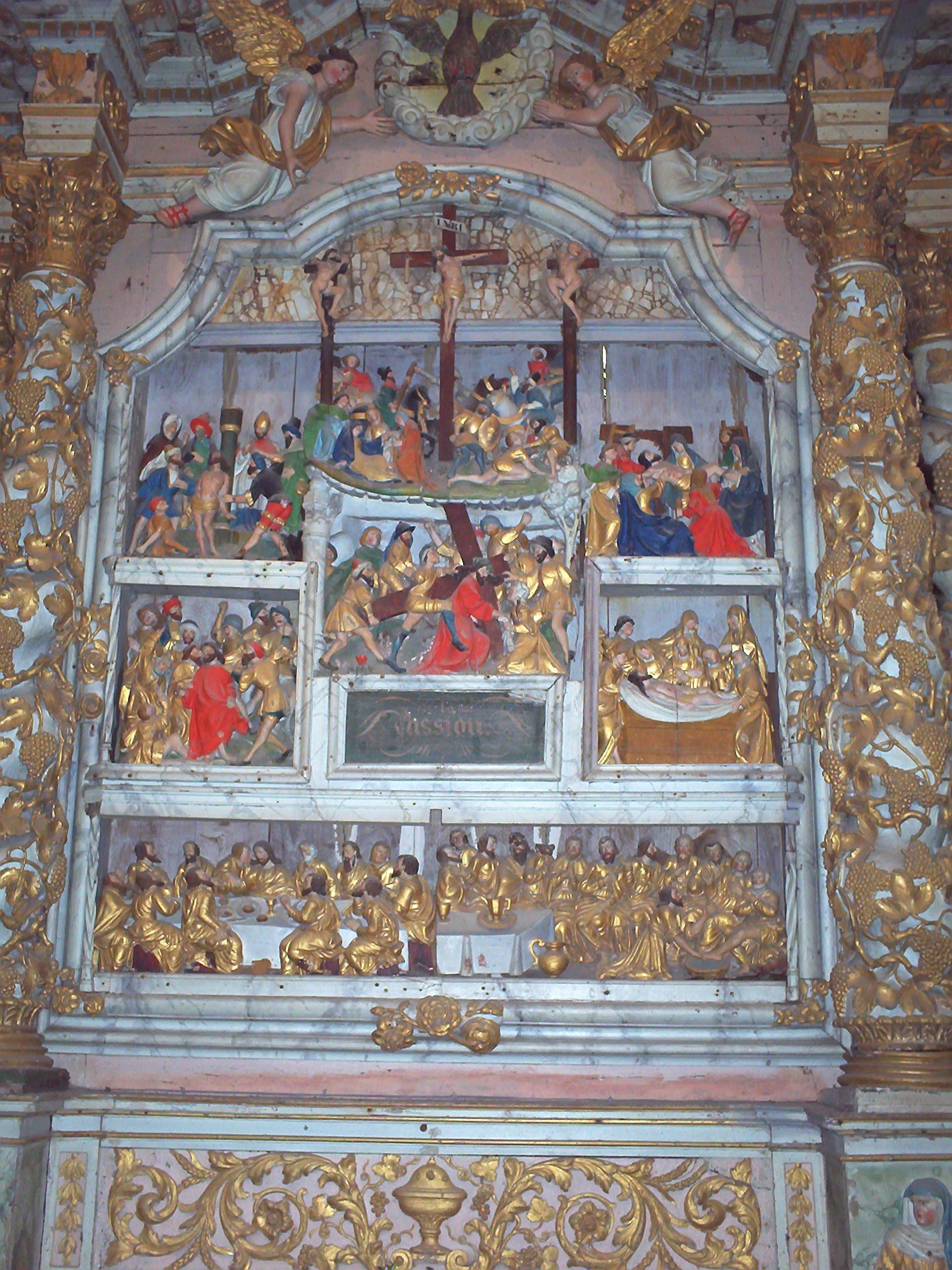
Retable of the Passion at Lampaul-Guimiliau

== Features ==
Parish closes are defined by a continuous containing wall, completely surrounding the churchyard, of which the greater area is the parish cemetery. There are often stiles but the only easy entrance is through a ceremonial arch, often elaborately detailed with pinnacles and carving. Within the gateway, an open, paved assembly area surrounds the calvary or crucifix.

The calvaries of the close churches are significant works of popular art. Usually they display three crucified figures: Christ and the two thieves. At the base, they may feature relief panels, free-standing sculptural groups or both. These onlookers of the crucifixion nearly always include the Virgin Mary and St John the Apostle, but also many other heroes and villains – sometimes including local or national magnates.

The ossuary or charnel house, where present, may be substantial, and several were intended to contain large sculptures or paintings, frequently of the Deposition or Entombment of Christ. Generally, the ossuaries have been emptied of their bones.

Some of the church buildings exemplify late Gothic architecture, while others are Baroque in style, and a number feature large belfries. The interiors are dominated by sumptuous Baroque decoration and statuary, much of it polychrome. Both the main altar and each of the many side and chapel altars are backed by a large retable, generally focusing on the Passion of Christ or the life and death of a saint. Typically a large, sometimes free-standing, central figure is surrounded by tableaux and reliefs in rich detail, which expound and expand the central theme. So, for example, a Passion, may be illustrated by scenes of martyrdom or sacrifice. The baptisteries are often octagonal, surmounted by large canopies on pillars, often highly embellished, with vines, birds, snakes and narrative reliefs. The pulpit is usually a dominant feature within the nave, reflecting a revival of preaching during the 17th century, and often decorated with relevant scenes or symbols, like the Four Evangelists.

== See also ==
- Argol Parish close
- Brasparts Parish close
- Catholic Church in France
- Cléden-Poher Parish close
- Culture of France
- French architecture
- Guimiliau Parish close
- History of France
- Kergrist-Moëlou. See The Calvary at Kergrist-Moëlou
- Lampaul-Guimiliau
- La Martyre Parish close
- La Roche-Maurice Parish close
- Lannédern Parish close
- Locmélar Parish close
- Pencran Parish close
- Pleyben Parish close
- Religion in France
- Roman Catholicism in France
- Saint-Thégonnec
- Sizun Parish close
