= Saint Servais Parish close =

Coordinates: 48.5116°N 4.1554°W

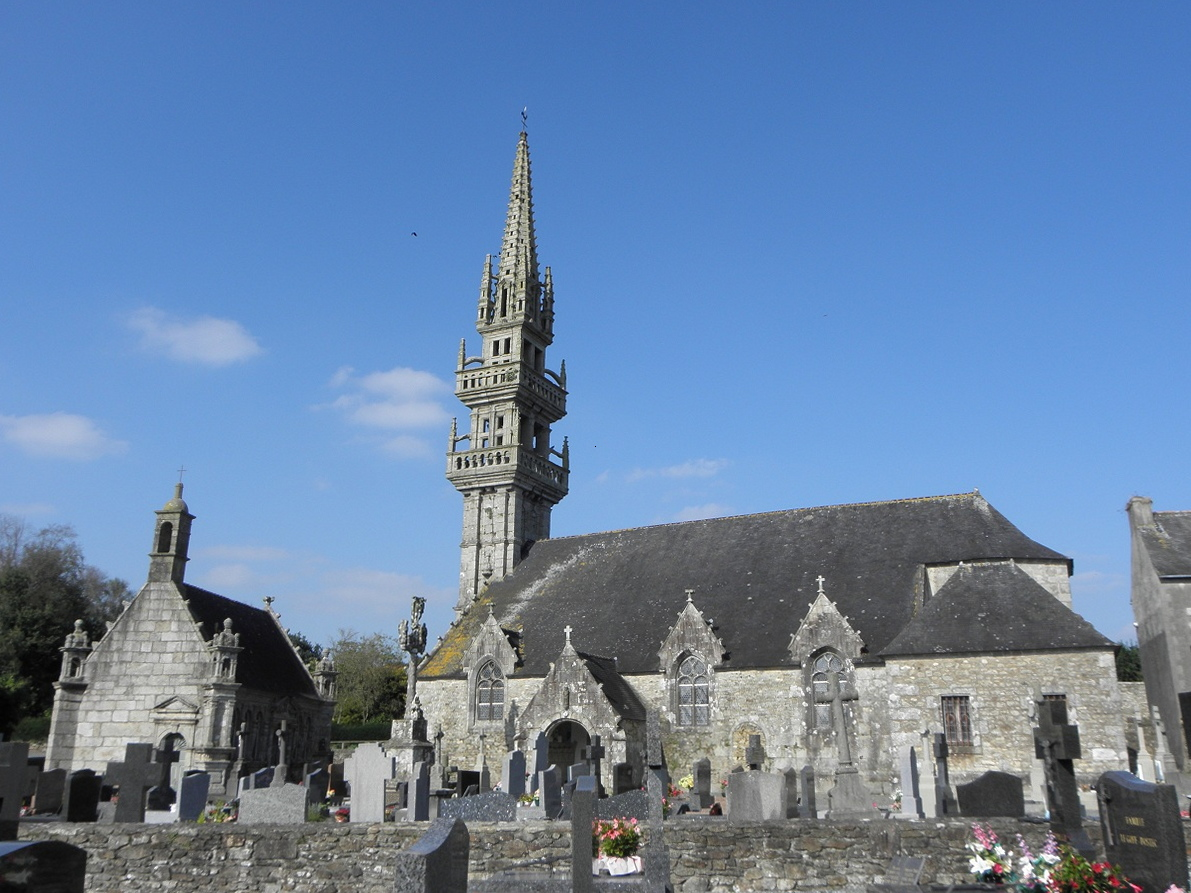
View of church and ossuary at Saint-Servais

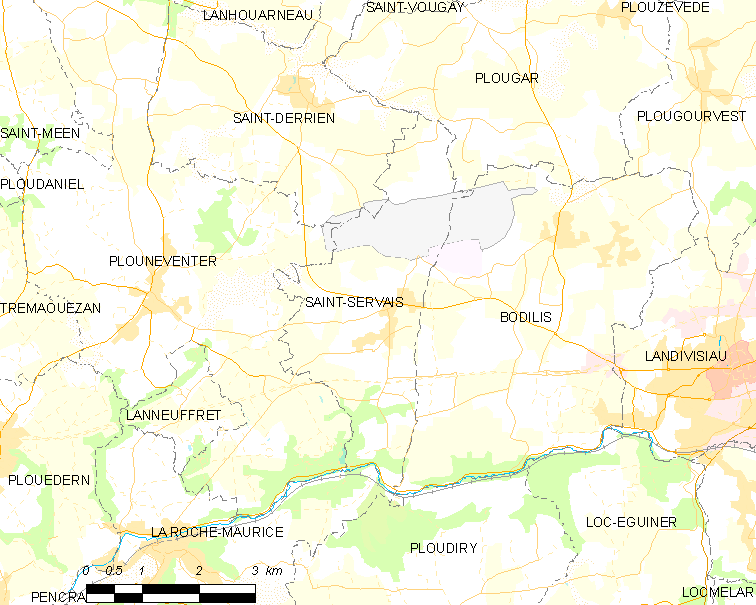
Map showing the location of Saint-Servais

The Saint Servais Parish close (Enclos paroissial) is located at Saint-Servais in the arrondissement of Morlaix in Brittany in north-western France. It comprises the parish church of Saint Servais, with galleried bell tower, an ossuary, and calvary. The church was built in the 17th century on the ruins of an old 13th century chapel founded by the Duschastels, an old Breton family. It has three transepts and a chevet dating to 1688. The clock tower dates to 1610 and rises to 36 metres. It is a listed historical monument since 1914.

== The choir altarpiece ==
This is the work of Louis Magado and dates to 1760. The base of the main altar has a painting at the centre by YanI' Dargent depicting "Christ en majesté". The stained glass windows on the north side and at the back of the altar represent Saints Luke, Peter and John and on the south side and again behind the altar are Saints Matthew, Mark and Paul. To the left of the main altar is a statue of Saint Servais.

== The "Virgin Mary" altarpiece ==
This is on the epistle side of the altar and has a painting by Dargent, "la Vierge au Rosaire".

== The Saint Joseph altarpiece ==
This is on the evangelist side and has another Dargent oil painting.

== The door to the Sacristy ==
A Renaissance style door leads to the sacristy.

== The door at the north side of the church ==
This door is decorated with panels depicting amongst other subjects, War, Peace and the Inquisition.

== The pulpit ==
Dates to 1666 and has four carved panels. One depicts the prophet Nathan reciting a parable to David. The others depict the Annunciation, the Nativity, and the crowning of the Virgin Mary.

== The baptismal fonts ==
Dating to 1678, the fonts are by Christophe Kerandel. The six-columned baldaquin is of more recent vintage. The font has an inscription in Latin reading "qui credit et baptisatus erit salvus erit" (whomsoever believes and is baptized will be saved").

== Miscellaneous ==
A large painting by Dargent depicting the legend of Salaün ar Foll can be seen in the church.

== The ossuary ==
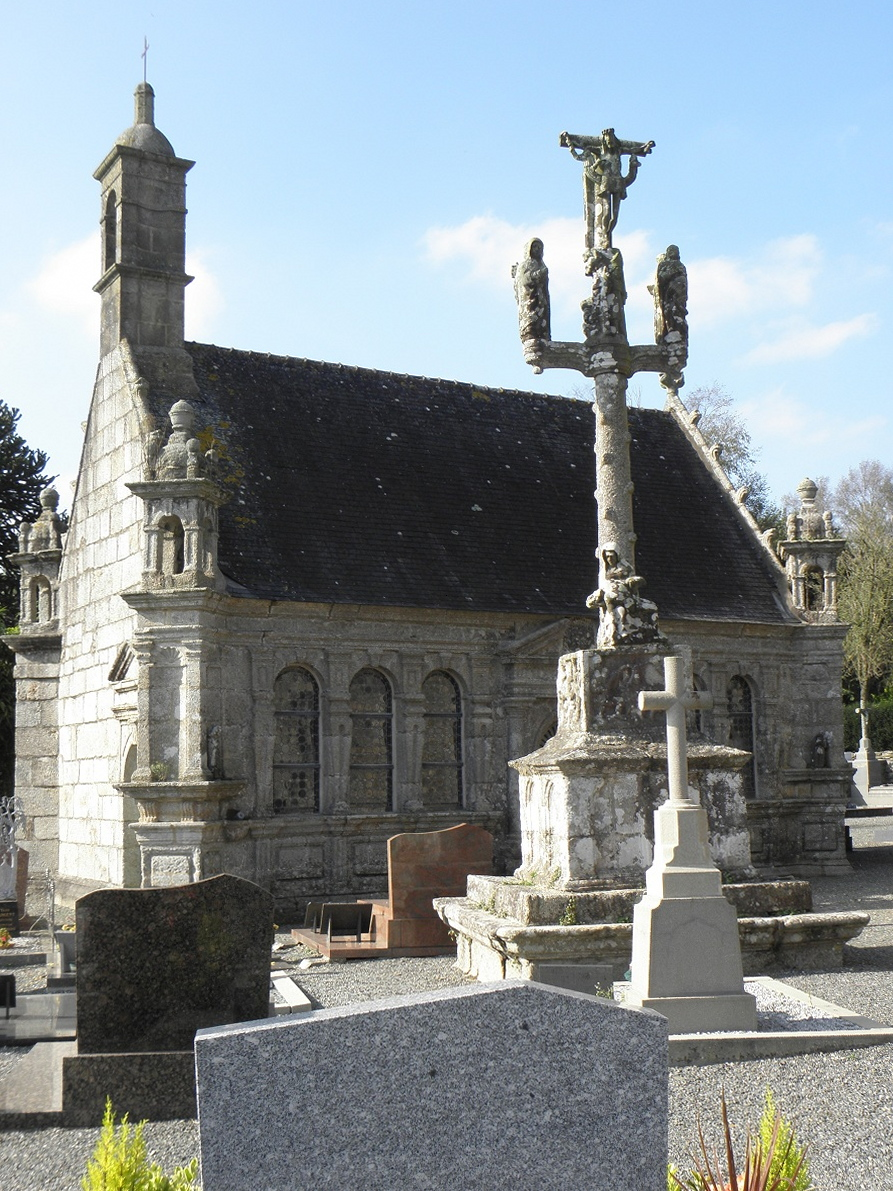
A view of the Saint-Servais ossuary and calvary

The ossuary is built in the Renaissance style of architecture and dates to 1643. The buttresses are topped with lanterons and the façade decorated with bays separated by pilasters. The ossuary contains frescos by the artist Yani' Dargent who also designed the main window in the ossuary which was the work of M. Nicolas from Morlaix. Dargent is buried in Saint-Servais' cemetery.

== The calvary ==
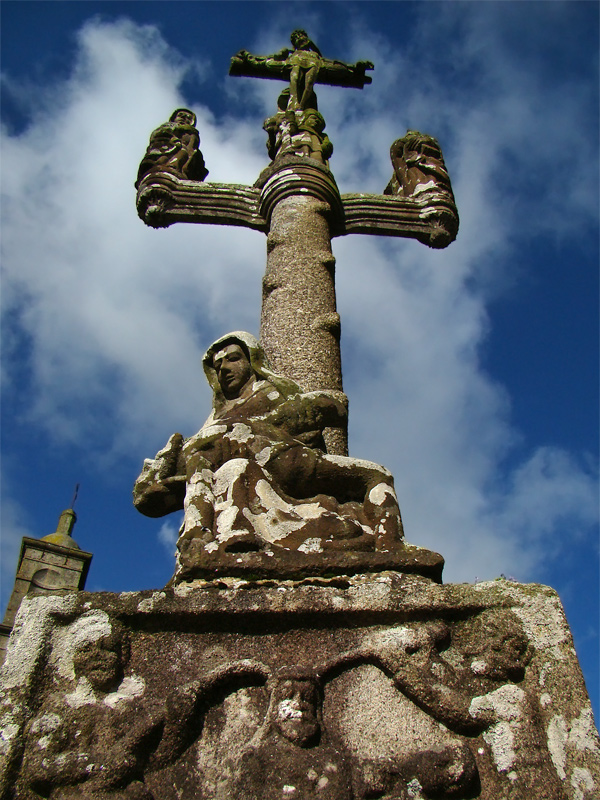
View of Roland Doré's pietà on the Saint Servais calvary

The calvary here is the work of the Roland Doré workshop and was started in 1610. The pietà is regarded as one of Doré's best works. Amongst the statuary is a depiction of Saint Servais with key as well as Saints Peter and Paul. On the reverse side of the depiction of Jesus on the cross there is "Christ aux liens" capturing that poignant moment when Jesus sits awaiting crucifixion. John the Evangelist and the Virgin Mary are on the reverse side of Peter and Paul as Doré uses the Breton tradition of statues "géminées". The cross stands on a square base which carries four bas-reliefs dating to 1548. These depict the flagellation, the crowning with a crown of thorns, Jesus carrying the cross and the Resurrection.

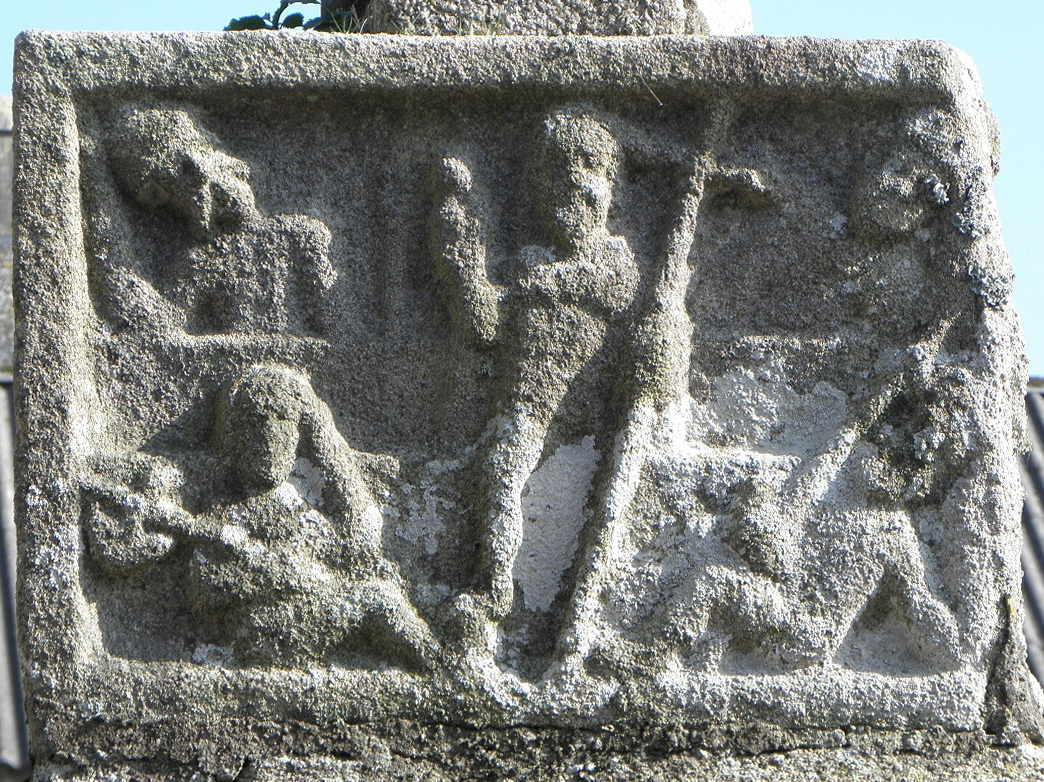
The Resurrection. One of the bas-reliefs on the base of the Saint Servais calvary

== The south porch ==
The porch is somewhat plain by Brittany standards but there is a fine stoup at the side of the door dating to 1681. It is the work of Christophe Kerandel who also worked on the church's baptistery.

== Miscellaneous images ==
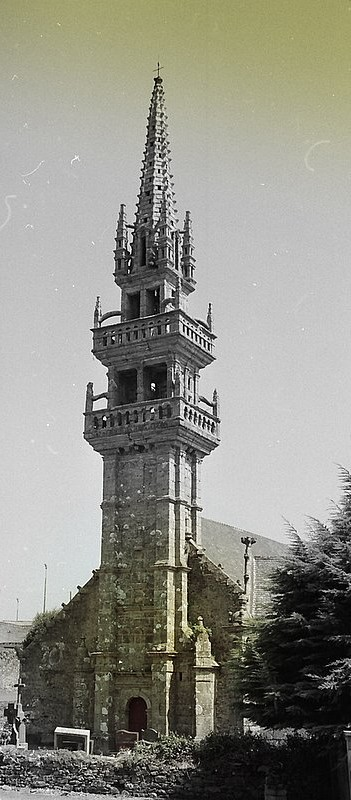
View of the bell tower

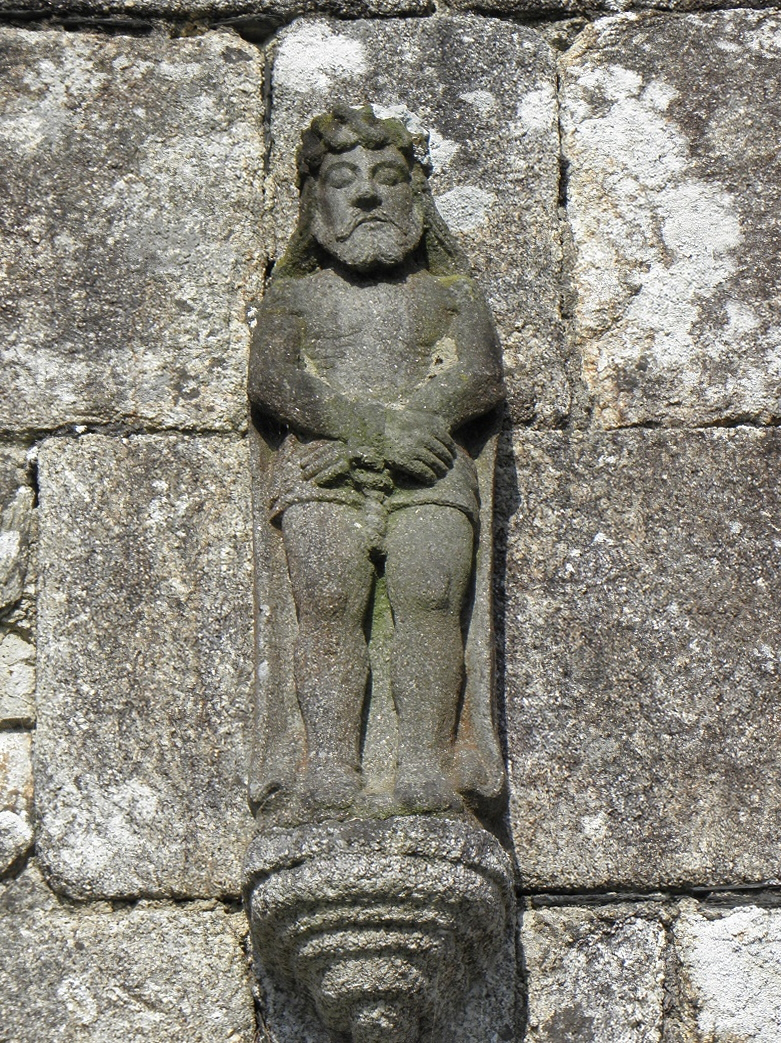
An "Ecce Homo" on the church gable

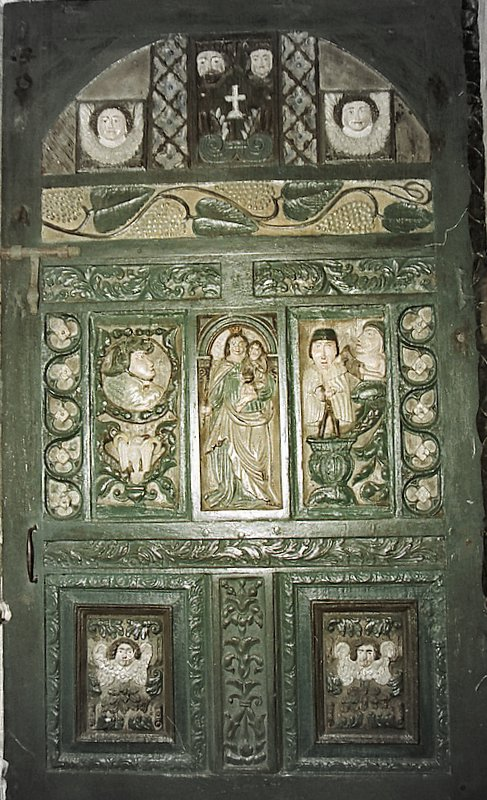
The door on the north side of the church

== Note ==
The painter and illustrator Jean-Édouard Dargent was known as Yani' Dargent. He was born in Saint-Servais in 1824 and died in Paris in 1899.

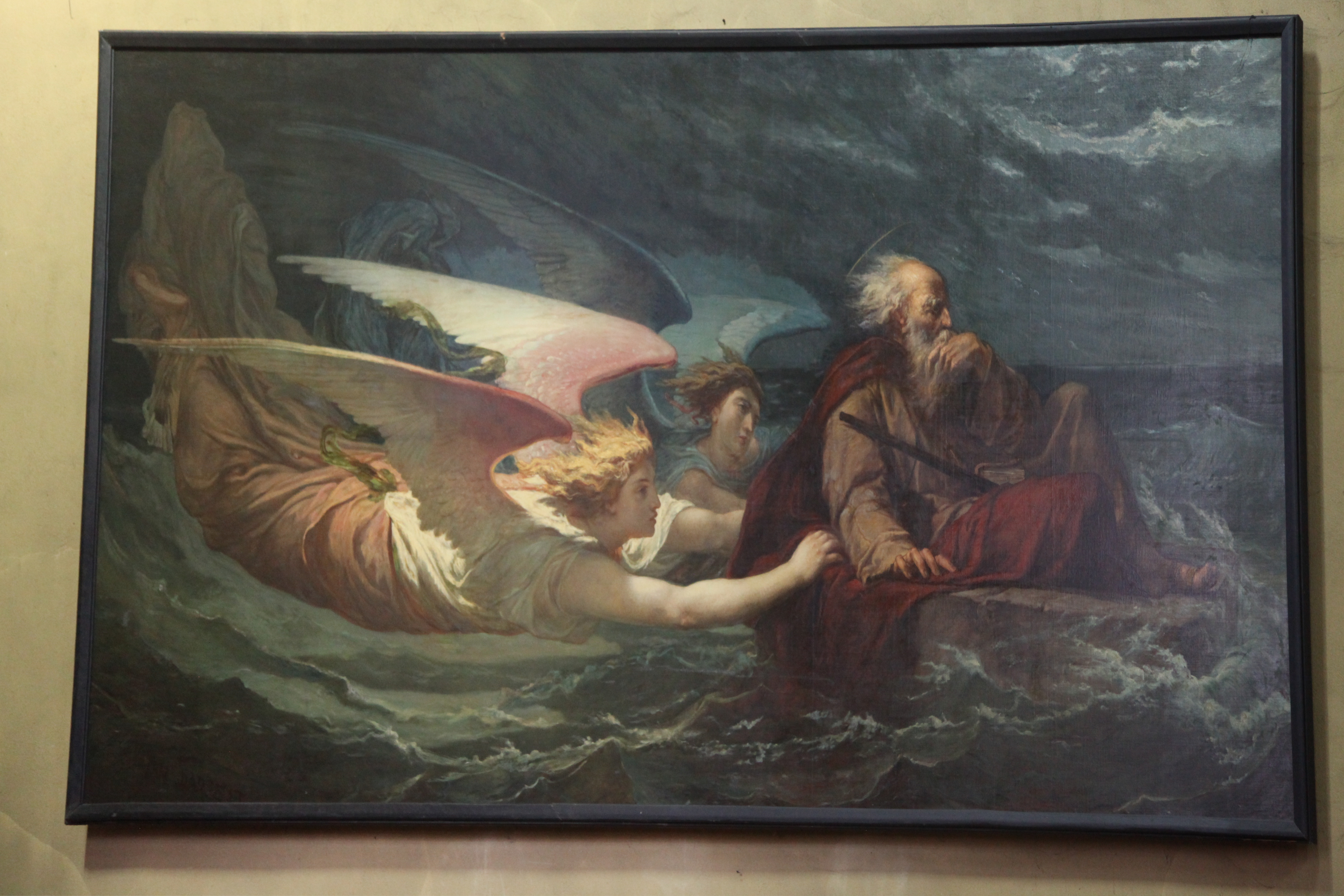
Dargent's painting depicting Saint Houardon

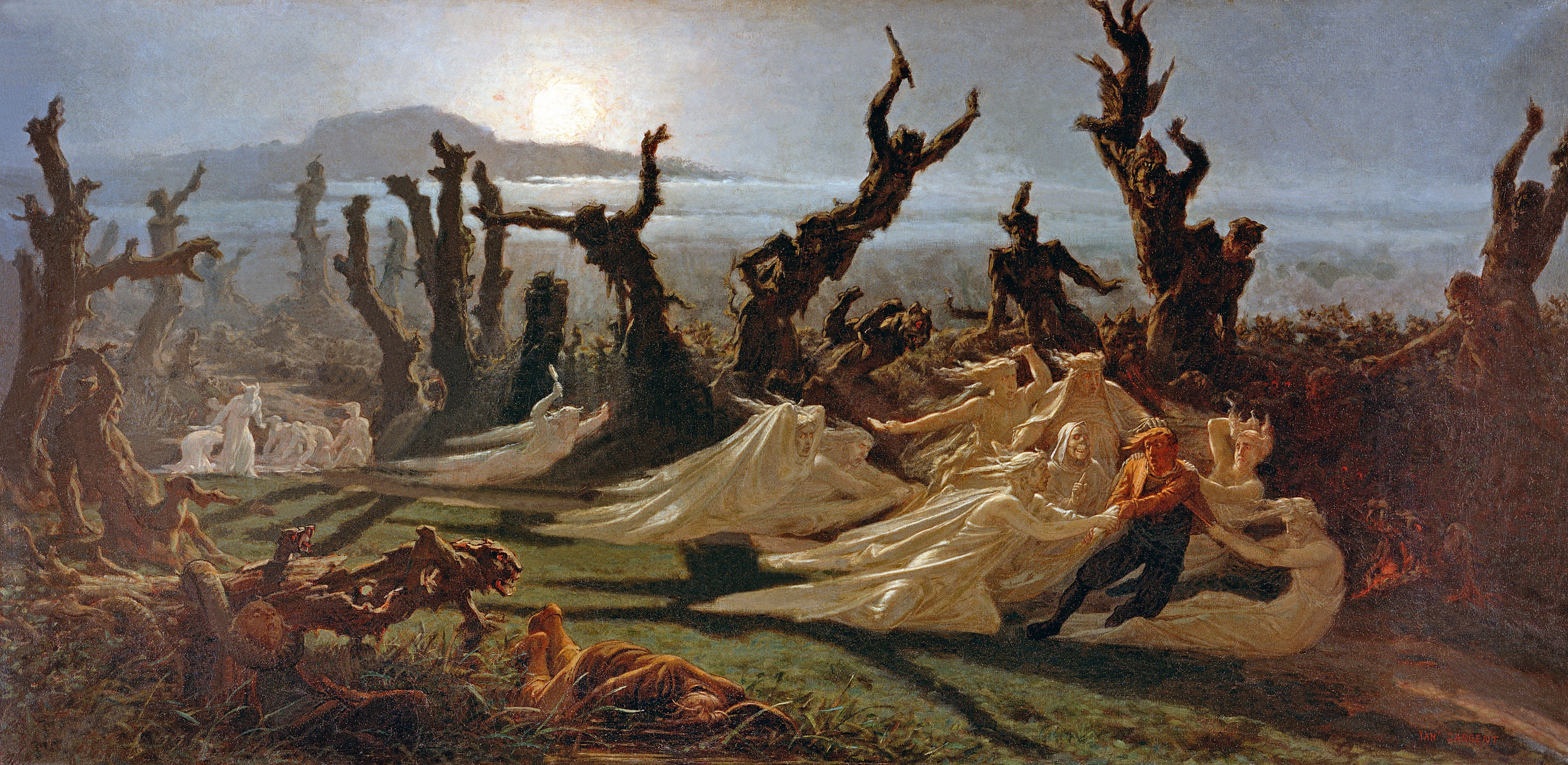
A Yani' Dargent oil painting Les Lavandières de la nuit
