= Saint-Servais, Finistère =

Saint-Servais Sant-Servez-Landivizio
- Commune
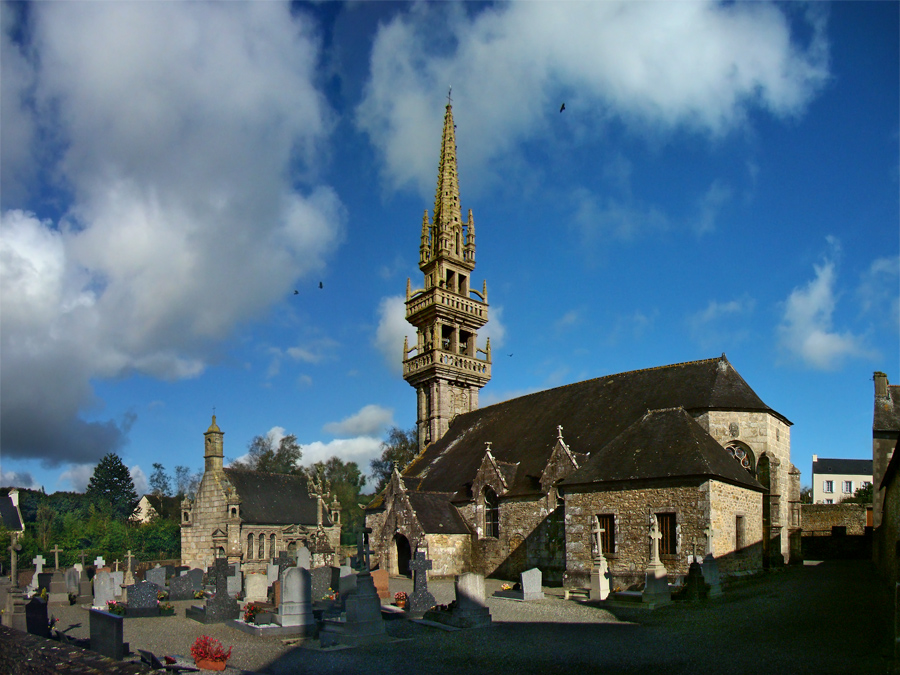
- Parish close
- Location of Saint-Servais
- Location within France Location within Brittany
- Coordinates: 48°30′42″N 4°09′13″W
- Country: France
- Region: Brittany
- Department: Finistère
- Arrondissement: Morlaix
- Canton: Landivisiau
- Intercommunality: Pays de Landivisiau

Government
  - Mayor (2020–2026): Bernard Michel
- Area^{1}: 10.29 km^{2} (3.97 sq mi)
- Highest elevation: 116 m (381 ft)
- Lowest elevation: 23 m (75 ft)
- Population (2023): 784
  - Density: 76.2/km^{2} (197/sq mi)
- Time zone: UTC+01:00 (CET)
  - Summer (DST): UTC+02:00 (CEST)
- INSEE/Postal code: 29264 /29400
- ^{1} French Land Register data, which excludes lakes, ponds, glaciers > 1 km^{2} (0.386 sq mi or 247 acres) and river estuaries.

Saint-Servais (French pronunciation: [sɛ̃ sɛʁvɛ]; Breton: Sant-Servez-Landivizio) is a commune in the Finistère department of Brittany in north-western France.

== See also ==
- Communes of the Finistère department
- Yan' Dargent
- Saint Servais Parish close
