= Yan' Dargent =

French painter (1824–1899)

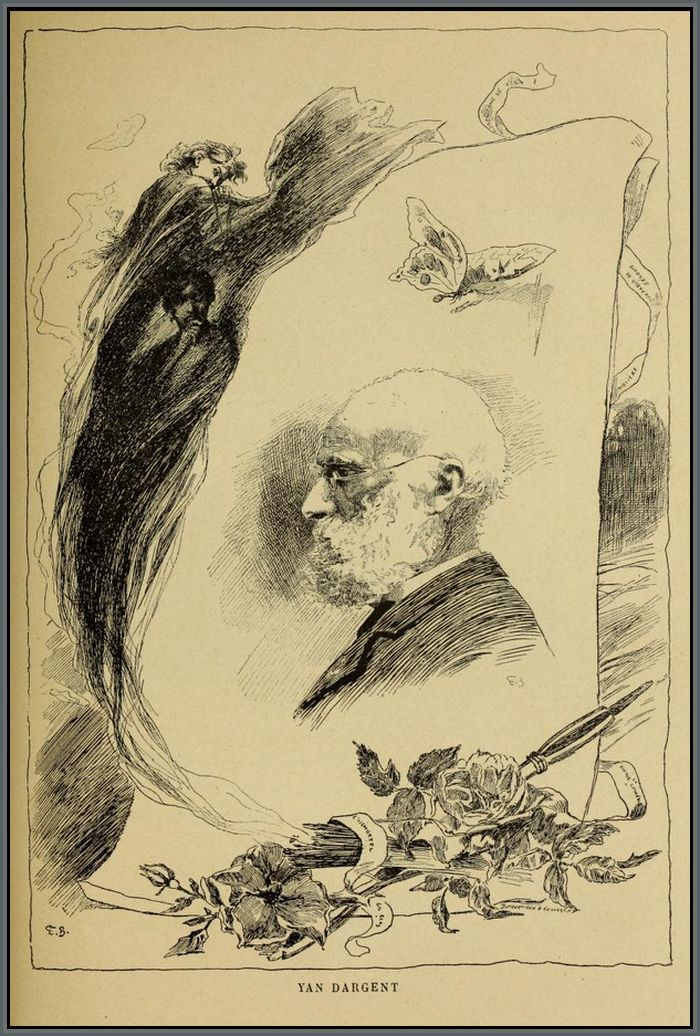
A 1898 sketch of Yan' Dargent by Émile Bayard

Jean-Édouard Dargent (15 October 1824 – 19 November 1899), known as Yan' Dargent and in his later years Yann Dargent, was a French painter and illustrator. Most of his paintings depicted Brittany.

== Biography ==
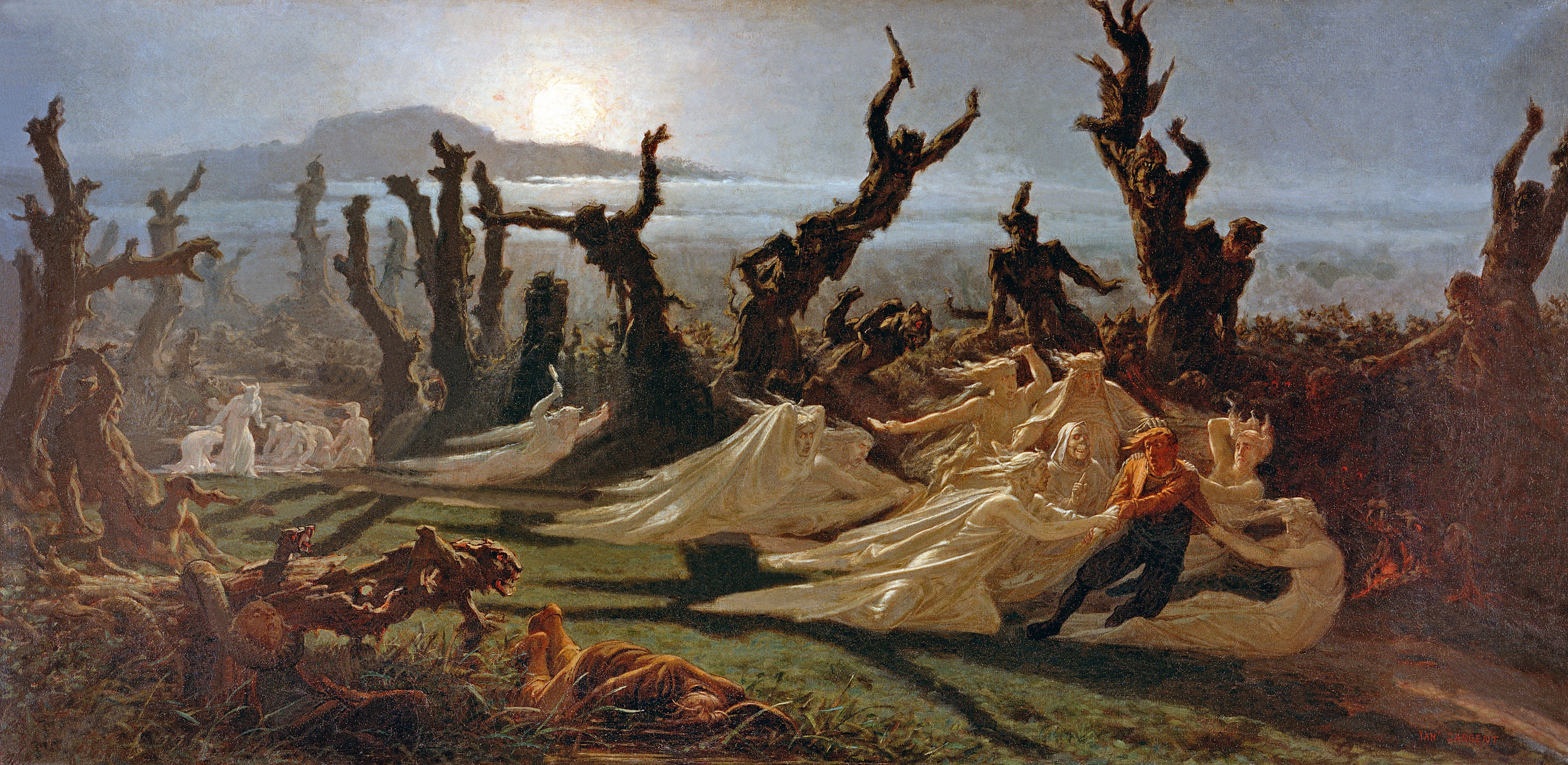
Yan Dargent's iconic painting "Les Lavandières de la nuit". Painted in 1861. Now in the Quimper Musée des beaux-arts. In a scene lit by moonlight, Dargent depicts the legendary ghosts of washerwoman at work

Édouard Yan' Dargent was born on the 15 October 1824 at Saint-Servais situated between Landerneau and Landivisiau. His father Claude Dargent had come from Lorraine and was a tanner. His mother Marguerite Perrine Clémentine Robée was the daughter of Pierre Robée. Claude had become the mayor at the time of the July Monarchy. Yani's mother died when he was only two years of age and his father soon remarried and Dargent was put in the care of his maternal grandfather Pierre Robée, a retired sailor. He was educated at Plouaret at a school where his uncle Thomas, an ex-chouan, was schoolmaster. He received a basic education alongside François-Marie Luzel, the Breton poet, who was also a good friend. He then attended the Landerneau Saint-Joseph college until, at the age of twelve, he moved to Saint-Pol-de-Léon's Notre-Dame du Kreizker Institute. After his schooldays he rejoined his father who had moved to Landerneau being unable to set-up his tannery in Morlaix. When the time came to choose a career, Yan' Dargent's grandfather wanted him to join the navy but Yani' did not feel the pull of the sea, being mostly interested in mathematics and design. He passed his exams and was admitted to the government department administrating bridges and highways and then moved to the railways. In 1846, he was in Troyes as a works inspector for the construction of the railway when he met a professor called Jules-Nicolas Schitz who recognized Dargent's aptitude for drawing and the two made trips into the countryside to sketch (Dargent never attended an art college and was self-taught).

In 1850, he resigned from his job with the railways and moved to Paris determined to make a living from art but independently and not attached to any particular studio/workshop ("atelier") and, alongside Gustave Doré, became known as an accomplished illustrator. His output as an illustrator over the years was prolific. Many of his illustrations appeared in "La France illustrée" as well as "Le Tour du Monde" a travel magazine edited by Edouard Charton and published by Hachette et Cie, "La Chasse illustrée" published by Firmin Didot et Cie, the "L'Exposition universelle illustrée de 1867" published by Dueuing and "Le Korrigan", a Breton artistic journal In Paris. He worked tirelessly and in 1851, and for the next ten years, exhibited every year at the Paris Salon. His 1851 works were le Retour and les Baigneuses. Success finally came in 1861 when he exhibited four canvases, Les Lavandières de la nuit, Souvenir de collège, Les Pilleurs de Mer à Guissény and Pâtres des plaines de Kerlouan. Lavandières de la nuit was particularly singled out for praise, particularly by Théophile Gautier. This painting can be seen at the Musée des beaux-arts in Quimper.

Although this did not lead to any further immediate success, Dargent, encouraged by his friend and rival Gustave Doré, applied himself to book illustration which brought in a greater income than his paintings, and worked on illustrations for magazines such as "Magasin pittoresque", "Musée des familles", "La vie à la campagne" and "La France illustrée". At this time he had a villa built near to Saint-Pol-de-Léon at Créac'h-André, a spot where he had often walked whilst a schoolboy. On 3 July 1867, he married Eugénie Antoinette Stéphanie Mathieu, a musician and the daughter of the painter Eugène Mathieu a director of the "La France illustrée". Then between 1869 and 1878, he was commissioned to contribute to the decoration of several churches in Saint-Servais, Landerneau, Morlaix, Ploudalmézeau and the Quimper cathedral of Saint-Corentin. His work at the cathedral which involved painting murals for all the lateral chapels took him seven years. Other works include the canvas la Petite Roscovite which hangs in the Saint-Pol-de-Léon mairie. In February 1877 he was made a chevalier of the Legion of Honour. In 1898 when the Union régionaliste bretonne was established he became the first president of the Breton Beaux-Arts. Towards the end of his life he had some financial problems but was supported by his son. He died in Paris on 19 November 1899, seemingly from a pulmonary embolism, and is buried in Saint-Servais. See section on Dargent's tomb and the litigation which followed his burial.

Dargent was devoted to Brittany and his motto could well have been Bepred Breizad ("always a Breton")

== Collections ==
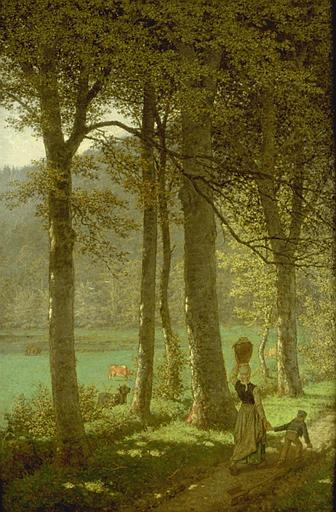
Yan' Dargent's "A la queue de l'étang de Brézal" painted in 1889. Now in the Rennes Musée des beaux-Arts.

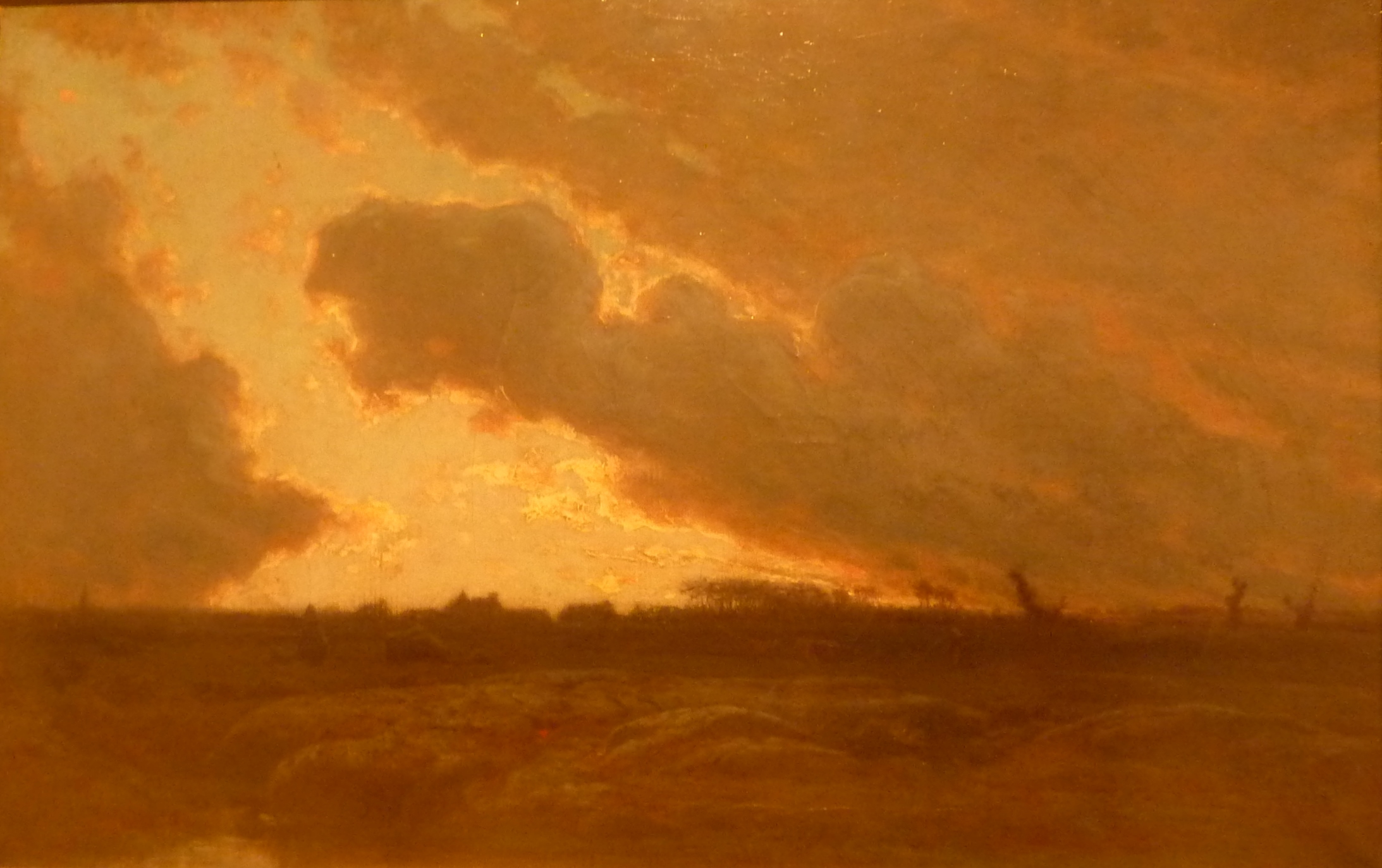
Yan' Dargent's "Soir en Plounéventer". Now in Vannes' Musée des beaux-arts

- "Ancien calvaire de Killinen, près Quimper". This oil on canvas painting is held by the Quimper Musée des beaux-arts
- "Le Travail". This 1875 painting is held in the Quimper Musée des beaux-arts
- "Le retour des champs; Le bonheur aux champs". This oil painting on canvas was executed before 1850. It was shown at the Paris Salon des artistes français in 1850. It is held in the Rennes Musée des beaux-arts.
- "A La Queue de l'etang de Bezal in Saint-Servais, Finistere". This oil on canvas painting is held in the Rennes' Musée des beaux-arts. It was executed in 1889 and shown at the Paris Salon of 1897.
- "Au Soleil Couchant". This oil on canvas painting is held in Vitré's Musée du château.
- "Le Dolmen de Saint-Servais"'. This oil on canvas painting dates to around 1894, the year it was shown at the Paris Salon. The painting is held by the Troyes Musée d'art d'archéologie et de sciences naturelle.
- "Idylle (Paysage avec deux personnages)". This oil on canvas painting was shown at the Paris Salon of 1864. It is held by Troyes' Musée d'art d'archéologie et de sciences naturelles.
- "Le Scorff, Brizeux et Marie". This oil on canvas painting was executed in 1889. The painting is held in Saint-Brieuc's Musée d'art et d'histoire des Côtes-d'Armor. It was exhibited at the 1889 Paris Salon.
- "Les vapeurs de la nuit". This painting was shown at the Paris Salon of 1863 and can be seen in Quimper's Musée des beaux-Arts. It depicts the "anaonn" or the souls of the dead in Breton legend.
- "Paolo et Francesca". This oil on wood painting representing the "La Divine Comédie" is located in Dijon's Musée national Magnin.
- "Bretons". This oil painting can be seen in Dole's Musée des beaux-arts.
- "Troyes, Maisons rue Notre-Dame". This work in graphite, grey wash and white gouache is held in Troyes Musee d'art d'archéologie et de sciences naturelles.
- "Portrait of Theophile Boutiot". This work in graphite and gouache dates to 1844 and is held in the Troyes Musee d'art d'archéologie et de sciences naturelles.
- "'La Falaise de Pen-Hir". This work in charcoal is held by the Brest Musée des beaux-arts
- Le soir aux grèves de Roscoff. This painting is held by the Brest Musée des beaux-arts.
- "L'Intempérance". This painting is held by the Quimper Musée des beaux-arts.
- "Soir en Plounéventer" . This oil on wood painting is held by the Vannes Musée des beaux-arts.

== Some other paintings by Dargent ==
- "Au bord de la mer". This painting was shown at the 1852 Paris Salon.
- "Les dénicheurs d'aigles". This painting was shown at the 1853 Paris Salon
- "Paysans bas-bretons". This painting was shown at the 1853 Paris Salon
- "Derniers Rayons". This painting was shown at the 1855 Paris Salon
- "Bords de la mer à Lokirech" and "Sauvetage à Guisseny" .These paintings were shown at the 1857 Paris Salon
- "Le Gué"
- "Les Pilleurs de mer à Guisseny"
- "Pâtre des plaines de Kerlouan, Menhir"
- "Souvenir de collège; environs de Saint-Pol-de-Leon"
- "Un soir dans la lande"
- "La Famille du Pêcheur"
- "La vache récalcitrante"
- '"Mort du dernier barde breton"
- '"Souvenir d'enfance". Shown in 1866.
- "Le Menhir". This painting depicts the legend of the bard Gwenclan.
- "Ancien calvaire de Killinen, près Quimper". Painted in 1893.
- "La Roche-Maurice". Shown in 1868.
- "Les pins de Santec". Shown in 1873.
- "Le sentier aux ramiers Brézal".
- "Saint Roch dans la solitude". Shown in 1874.
- "Falaise à Goullien"
- "Conversion extutique de saint Corentin et de saint Primel"
- "Bords du Scorff au Sac'h". Shown in 1876.
- "Falaise à Morgat"

== Ecclesiastical works ==
=== Works in Morlaix ===
For this chapel, which was built in 1865 by the architect Edouard Puyo, Dargent painted frescoes in the choir and nave areas.

=== Quimper cathedral ===
It is in Quimper's cathedral that one can see some of Dargent's greatest works. The cathedral's history goes back to 1424 and it was in 1887 that Mgr. Sergent decided to commission one artist to decorate the walls of the cathedral. He chose Dargent who painted frescoes for the nine principal chapels completing twenty murals spread over these nine chapels each having two paintings and two smaller chapels having just one painting.

Of these paintings the "Le ravissement de saint Corentin", "Le Martyre de saint Frédéric", "Saint Roch guérissant les pestiférés", "La Vie intérieure de saint Joseph et de la sainte Vierge" and "Saint Paul prêchant devant l'Aréopage" are perhaps the most remarkable.

The Saint Pierre chapel contains paintings of two important events in Saint Peter's life; "Christ remettant les clefs de son église à saint Pierre en présence des autres apôtres" (Christ handing the keys of his church to Saint Peter in the presence of other apostles) and the "Le Reniement de saint Pierre" in which Saint Peter is depicted sitting in both reflective and repentant mood after his denial of Jesus.

In the Saint Frederic chapel, one painting depicts Frederick of Utrecht remonstrating with King Louis the Pious and the second his assassination. Dying on the steps of the altar, Frederic prays for his two executioners. See Frederick of Utrecht

Two paintings decorate the Saint Roch chapel. One shows Saint Roch at the door of his hermitage, thanking God for the food brought to him each day by his dog. In the second painting, Saint Roch is depicted in Piacenza, praying on the steps of a church for those struck down by the plague.

The chapel of Saint Corentin has one painting depicting Saint Corentin and his disciple Saint Primel at the hermitage at Névet and the second, the "Ravissement de saint Corentin", depicts the ecstatic saint being carried up to heaven from Quimper by angels. The towers of the cathedral can be seen in the background.

Moving to the chapels at the sides of the nave, the Chapel of the Nativity of Our Lord (the "chapelle de la Nativité de Notre-Seigneur") has a painting depicting the newly born Jesus with Mary and Josep, whilst in the second painting Dargent depicts the "Adoration of the Magi".

The Chapel of St. Anne has paintings depicting the education of the Blessed Virgin and Saint Anne visiting the Holy Family in Bethlehem.

The two paintings of the Chapel of St. Joseph depict the "Flight into Egypt" and the death of St. Joseph.

The Chapel of St. John the Baptist has one painting depicting the baptism of our Lord Jesus Christ whilst the second depicts John the Baptist preaching in the wilderness.

In the Chapel of St Paul, the first painting depicts a scene of the road to Damascus. Saint Paul is thrown from his horse when Christ suddenly appears to him asking "Saul, Saul, why do you persecute me?. The second painting shows Paul preaching in Athens.

In the final two smaller chapels, the Chapel of Father Maunoir has a painting depicting Father Maunoir receiving the gift of the Breton language so that he can carry out evangelical work in Brittany.

Finally in the Chapel of Michael, the missionary Michel Le Nobletz is depicted holding a skull in his hands. He is preaching to a crowd of Bretons who, from their costumes, are from Quimper.

These then are the paintings commissioned in 1887 by Monseignor Sergeant shortly before his death, the work continuing under the direction of his successor Monseignor Nouvel. When Dargent was awarded the Cross of the Legion of honor it was reckoned that the paintings at the Quimper cathedral were a major reason for this award.

== Dargent's work in the enclos paroissial of Saint-Servais ==
The following paintings can be seen in the church itself.

- "Le Christ en majesté". This oil on canvas can be seen in the church's choir area.
- "La Vierge au Rosaire". This painting is in the chapel on the epistle side of the altar.
- "Le Baptême du Jourdain". This painting can be seen by the baptismal fonts.
- In the two large stained glass windows by the altar are depictions by Dargent of the apostles and the evangelists.
- "Saint François Xavier prêchant le Tiers Monde"'. Located in the church's œil de bœuf.

The following paintings can be seen in the enclos paroissial's ossuary.

- "La Saint Famille à Nazareth". An oil on canvas.
- "Ecce Homo"
- "La Prière et la Charité soulagent la Peine des Trépassés". A mural painting.

All the above works were restored in 1991. In 1992 the collection of Dargent paintings to be seen in the enclos paroissial was enriched by the large painting depicting an episode in the life of Salaun Ar Foll. This painting was found neglected in the ossuary and restored and placed in the church. Also four paintings commissioned from Dargent by a Benedictine monastery have been purchased by the museum and placed in the church. The four oils depicted "Saint Benedict and Saint Scholastica", "The Assumption", an "Ecce Homo" and "The Holy Women at the foot of the Cross".

== His work at Ploudalmézeau ==
The church of Saint-Pierre et Saint-Vincent Ferrier, rebuilt in 1857 and consecrated in 1859, has two paintings by Dargent. One depicts the descent from the Cross ("Descente de Croix" ) and is located in the Sacred Heart Chapel. The second depicts the deliverance of a soul from purgatory ("Délivrance d'une âme du Purgatoire") and is to be seen in the chapel of the Dead.

== Eglise des Carmes. Brest ==
This church, built in 1718, was destroyed by bombing in 1944. It had contained a painting by Dargent depicting the death of Saint Joseph ("la Mort de saint Joseph").

== The Église Saint-Houardon at Landerneau ==
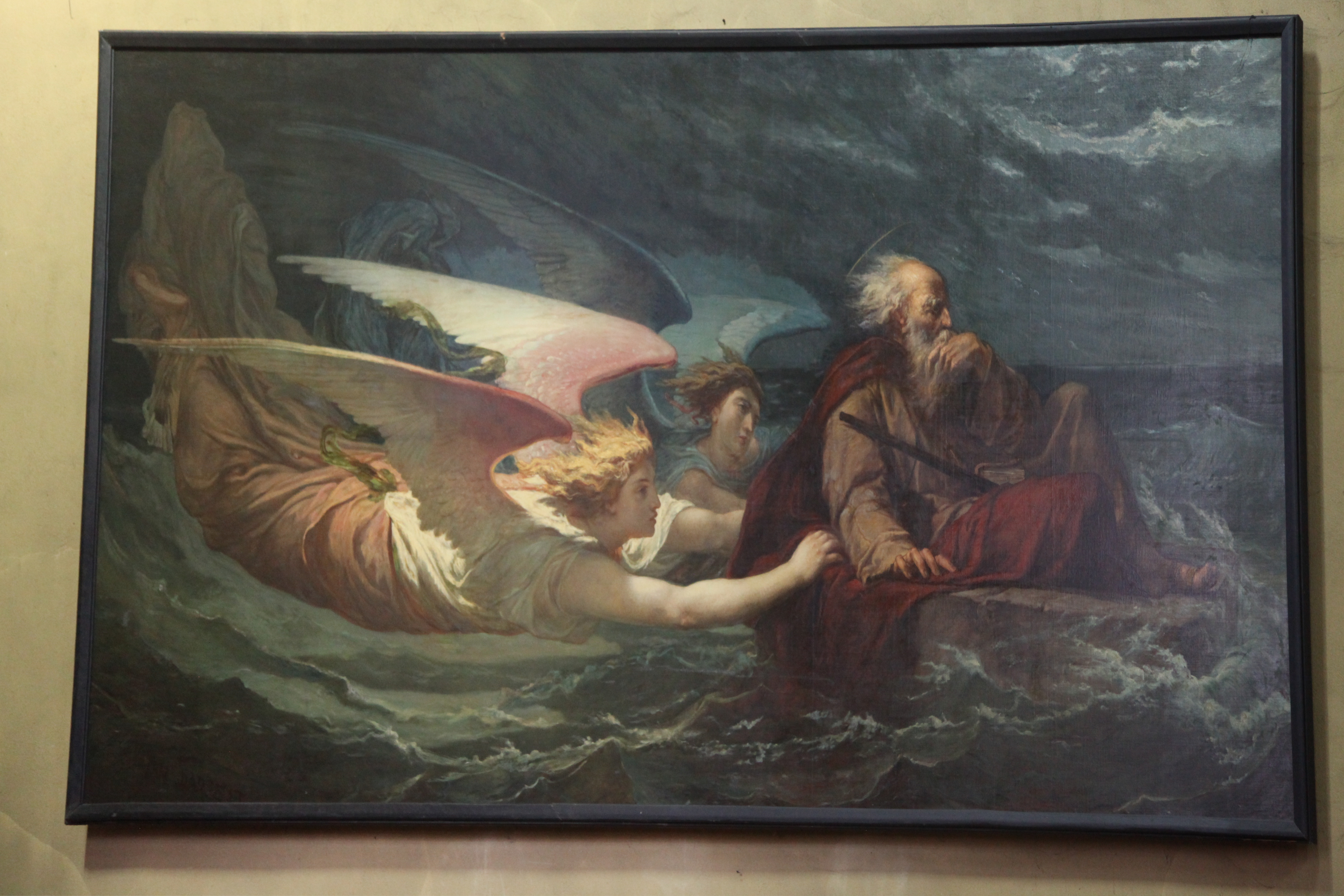
"Saint Houardon voguant dans une auge de pierre". Yan' Dargent's painting in the Eglise Saint-Houardon at Landernau

Dargent showed the painting depicting Saint Houardon at the Paris Salon of 1859 and it can now be seen in Landerneau's parish church.

== Le musée Yan' Dargent ==
The museum is to be found in Saint-Servais itself, curated by Monsieur Berthou. It is dedicated to the artist and by combining a visit to the museum with a visit to the enclos paroissial one can fully appreciate Dargent's work.

== His tomb ==
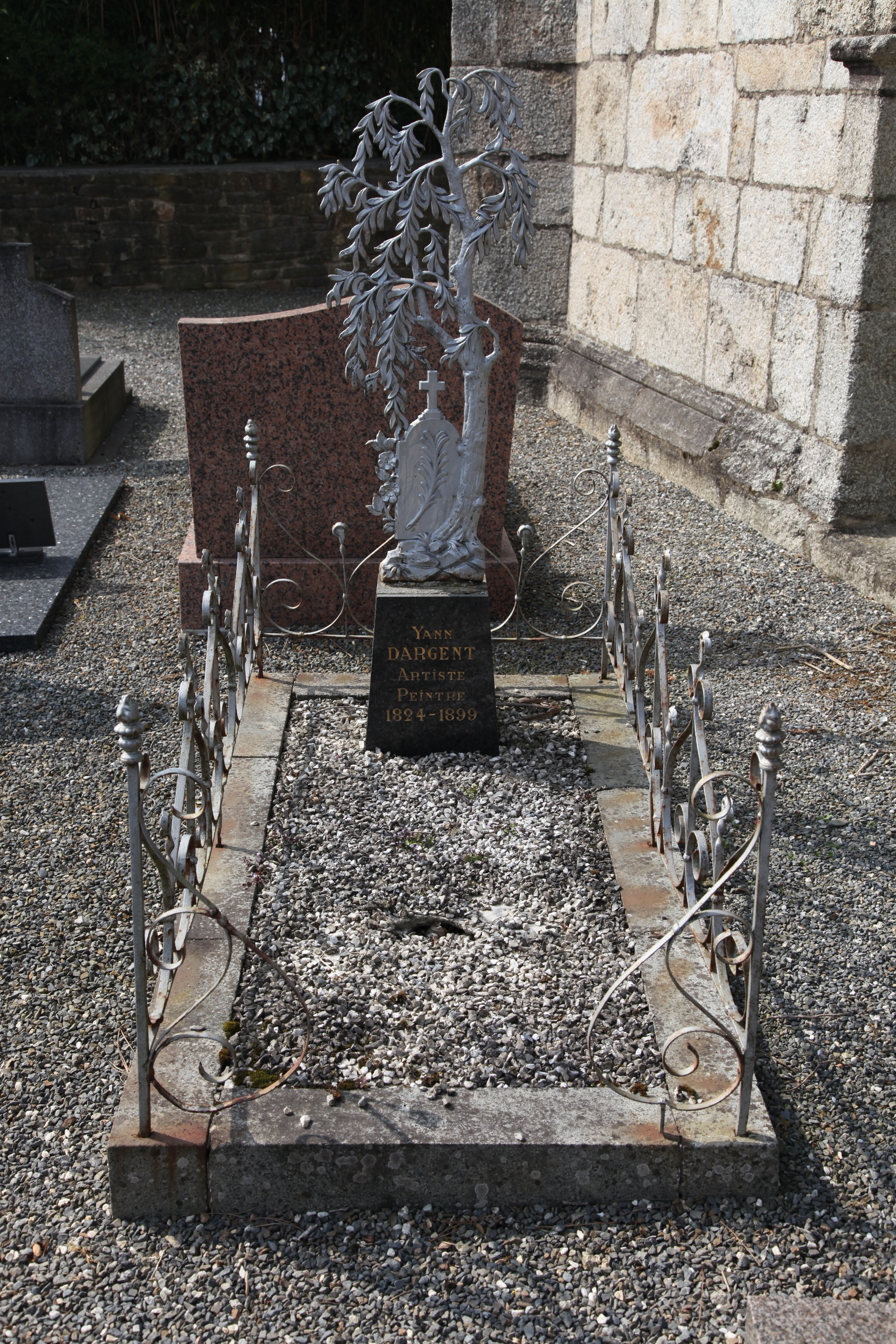
Tombe de Yan' Dargent at Saint-Servais

Before his death he had asked to be buried in Saint-Servais and that his skull be placed in the ossuary alongside the bones of his mother and grandparents which was the practice at the time. This by law could only take place five years after burial and on 8 October 1907, with the permission of the bishops of Quimper and the Léon diocese to open up the tomb and remove the head, the process was started. However the body was still in a good condition and the abbot Guivarc'h had to cut the head off himself. This led to litigation by some members of the Dargent family who accused Ernest and the bishop with violation of the Dargent grave. The trial lasted six months and although on the 26 June the Morlaix tribunal issued a verdict of not guilty, Ernest died four days later from the effects of the trauma the legal process had involved. The skull of Yan' Dargent is kept in a zinc reliquary to the right of the ossuary's altar.

== Notes ==
1. A number of preparatory sketches for the Quimper cathedral frescoes are kept in the "Musée départemental breton" of Quimper. The museum also hold two large plates decorated by Dargent.

2. Dargent also illustrated many books such as the "Les Contes bleus" by Edouard Laboulave, "Les Contes de Perrault", "Les Contes danois d'Andersen", "La Divine Comédie", "Fabiola", "Christophe Colomb" and "La Vie des Saints".

== Gallery ==
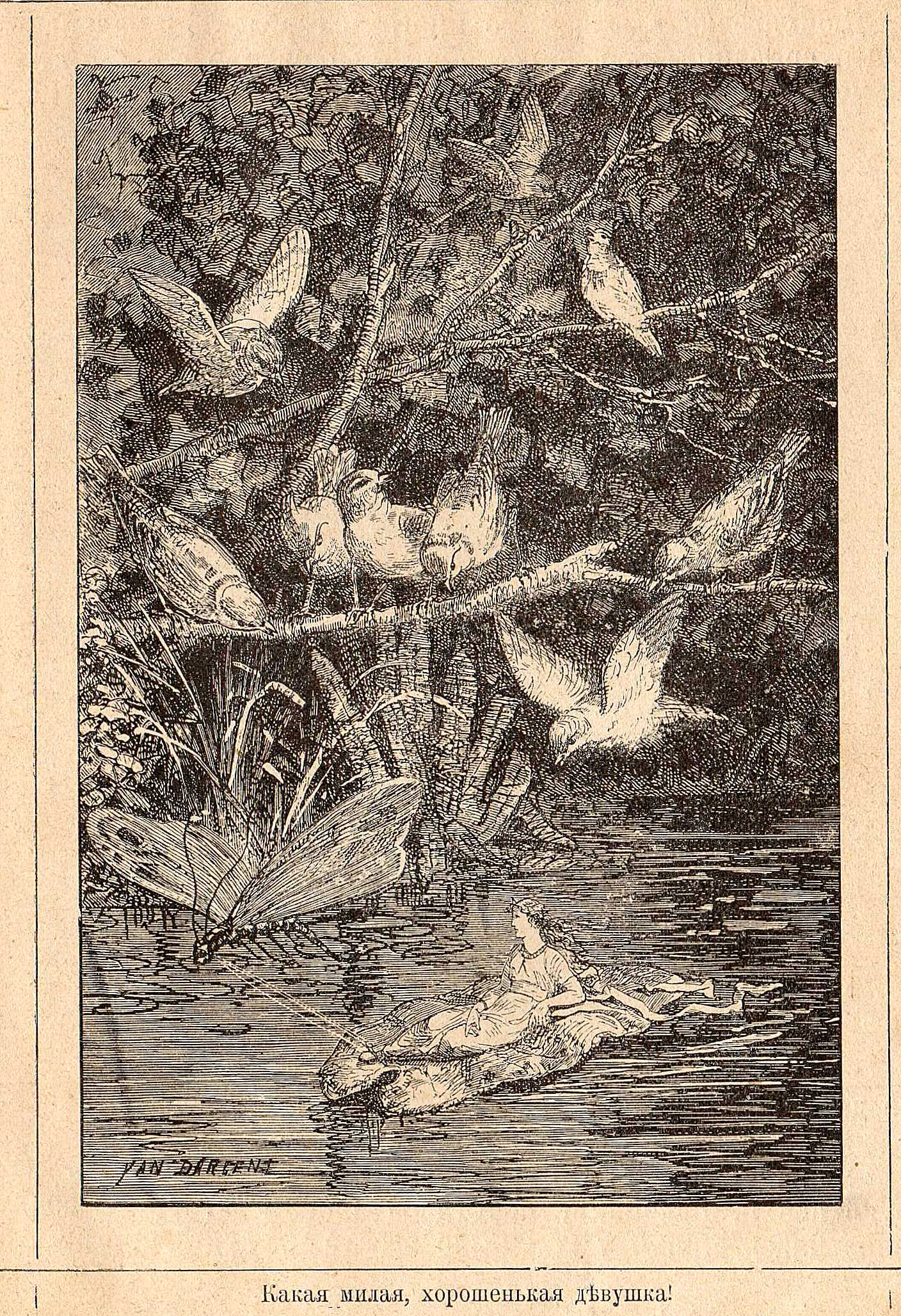
"Pucette". Illustration in "Contes" by Hans Christian Andersen

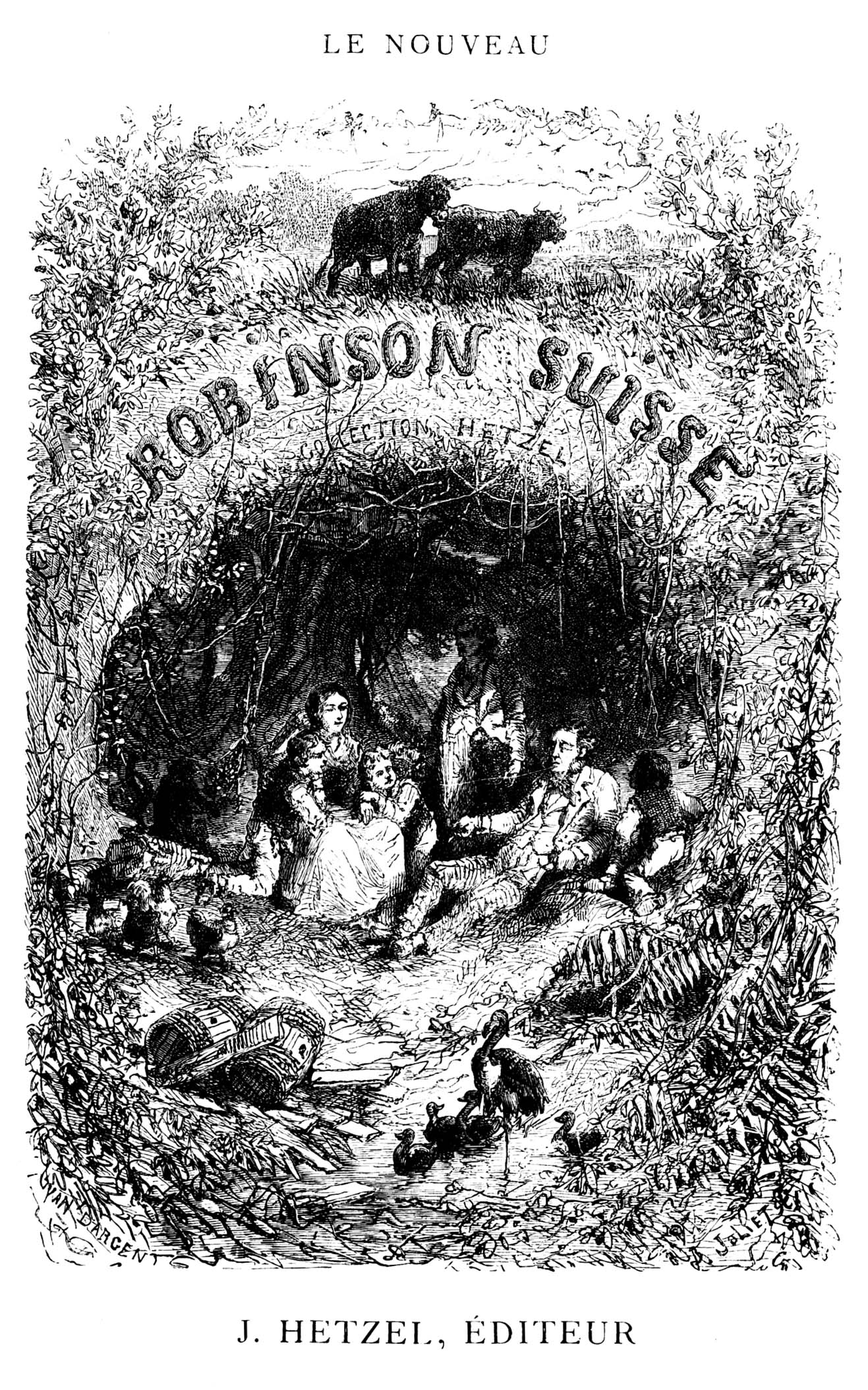
Frontispiece of "Nouveau Robinson suisse".

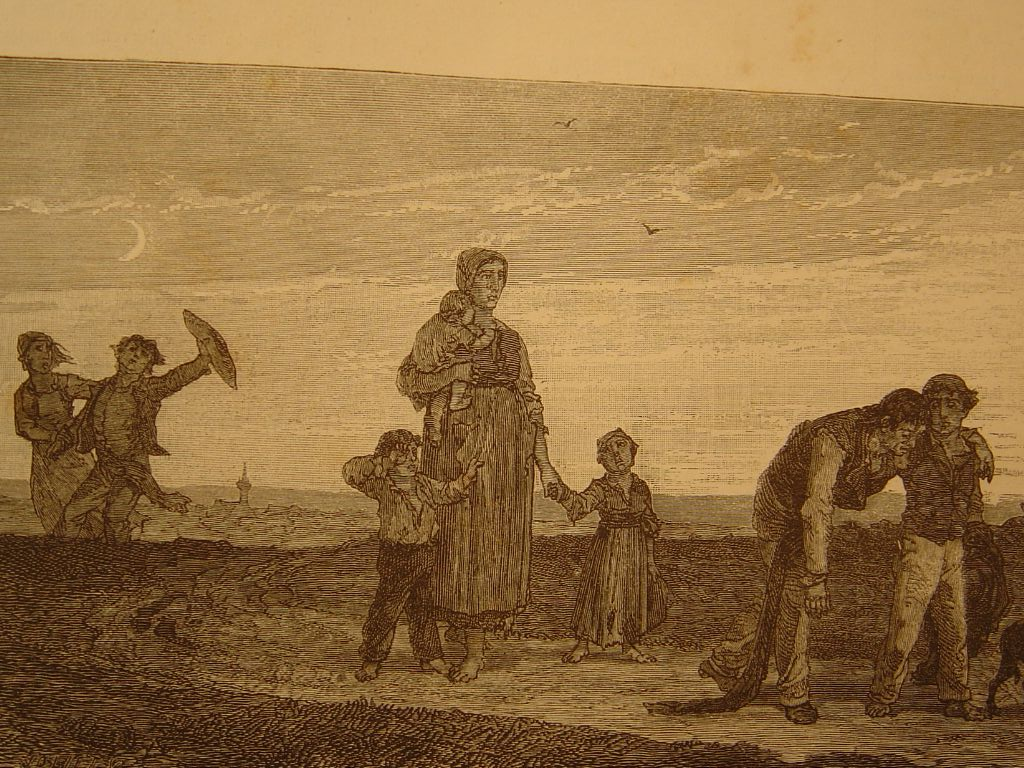
Work by Dargent in "L'illustration Européenne". Edition of 1872 no.24 page 189.

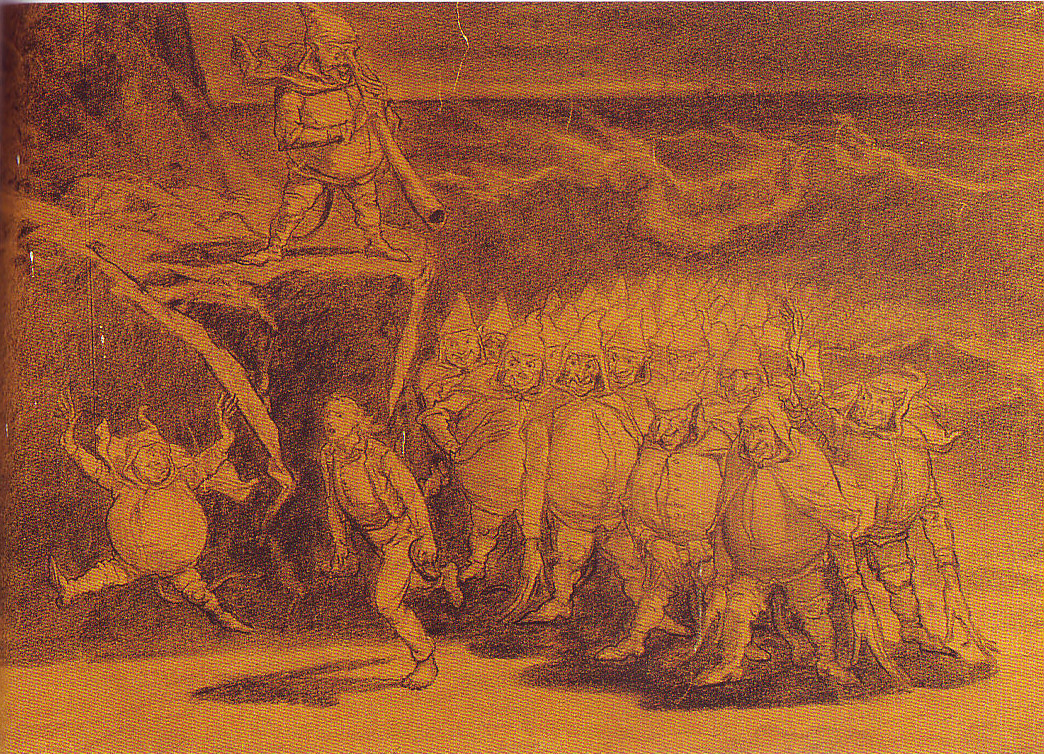
Dargent work of 1863 from the "Le magasin pittoresque"

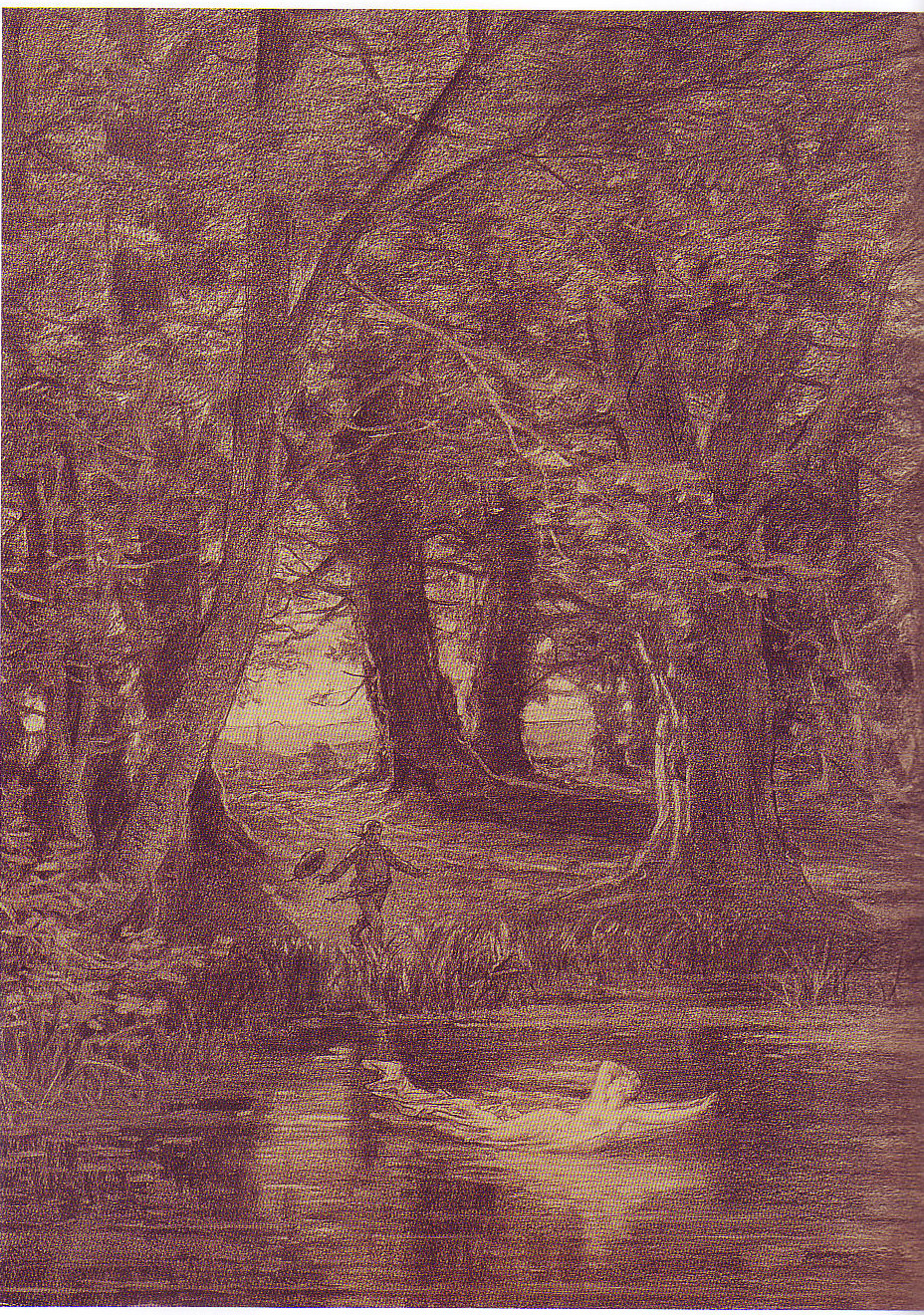
"Le spectre du marais" a work in charcoal of 1860 by Yann Dargent for Philippe Le Sturm's "Fées, korrigans & autres créatures fantastiques de Bretagne".

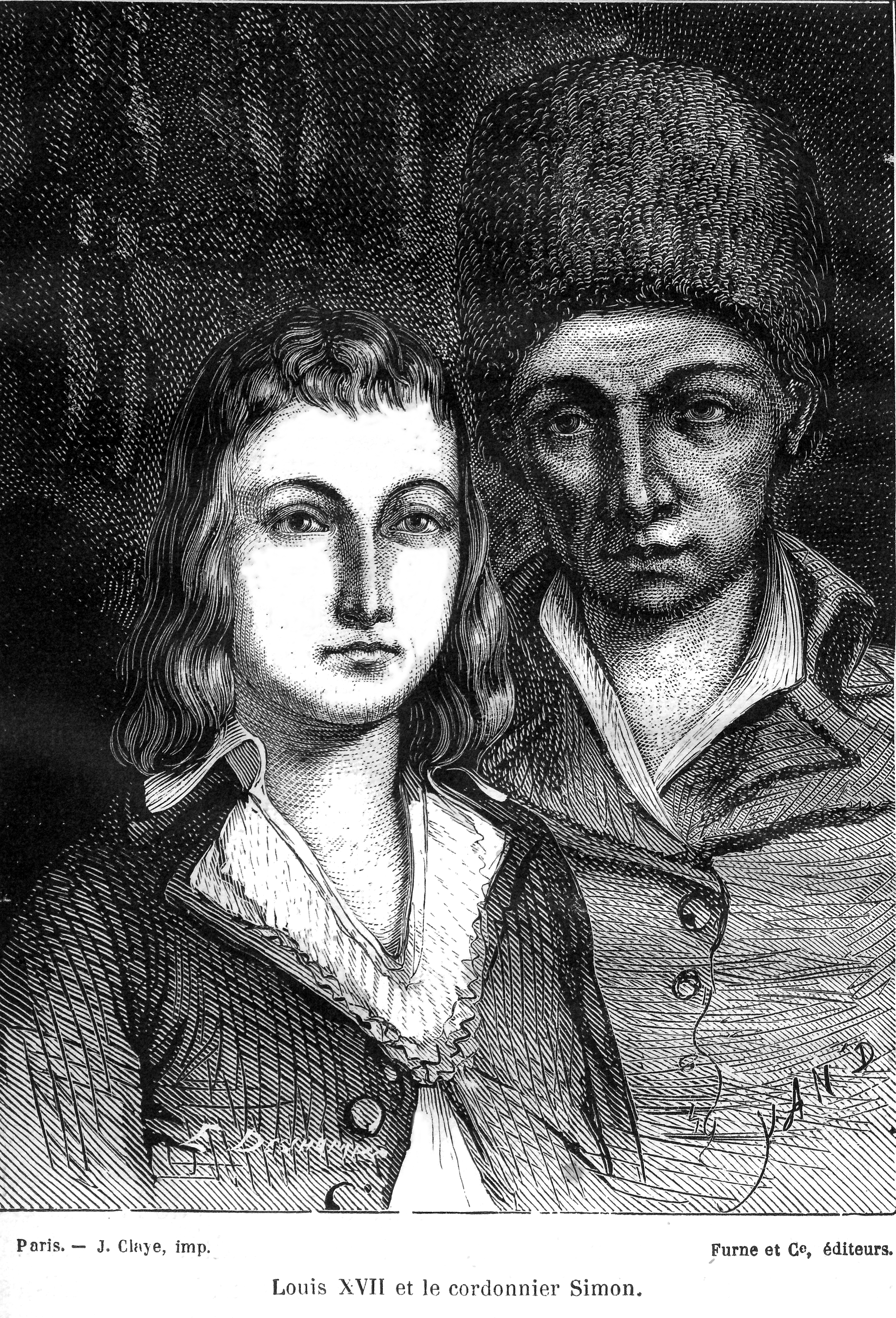
Louis XVII of France and his jailer during the French Revolution, the shoe repairer Antoine Simon. A Dargent engraving for the 1866 "Histoire de la Révolution" by Adolphe Thiers

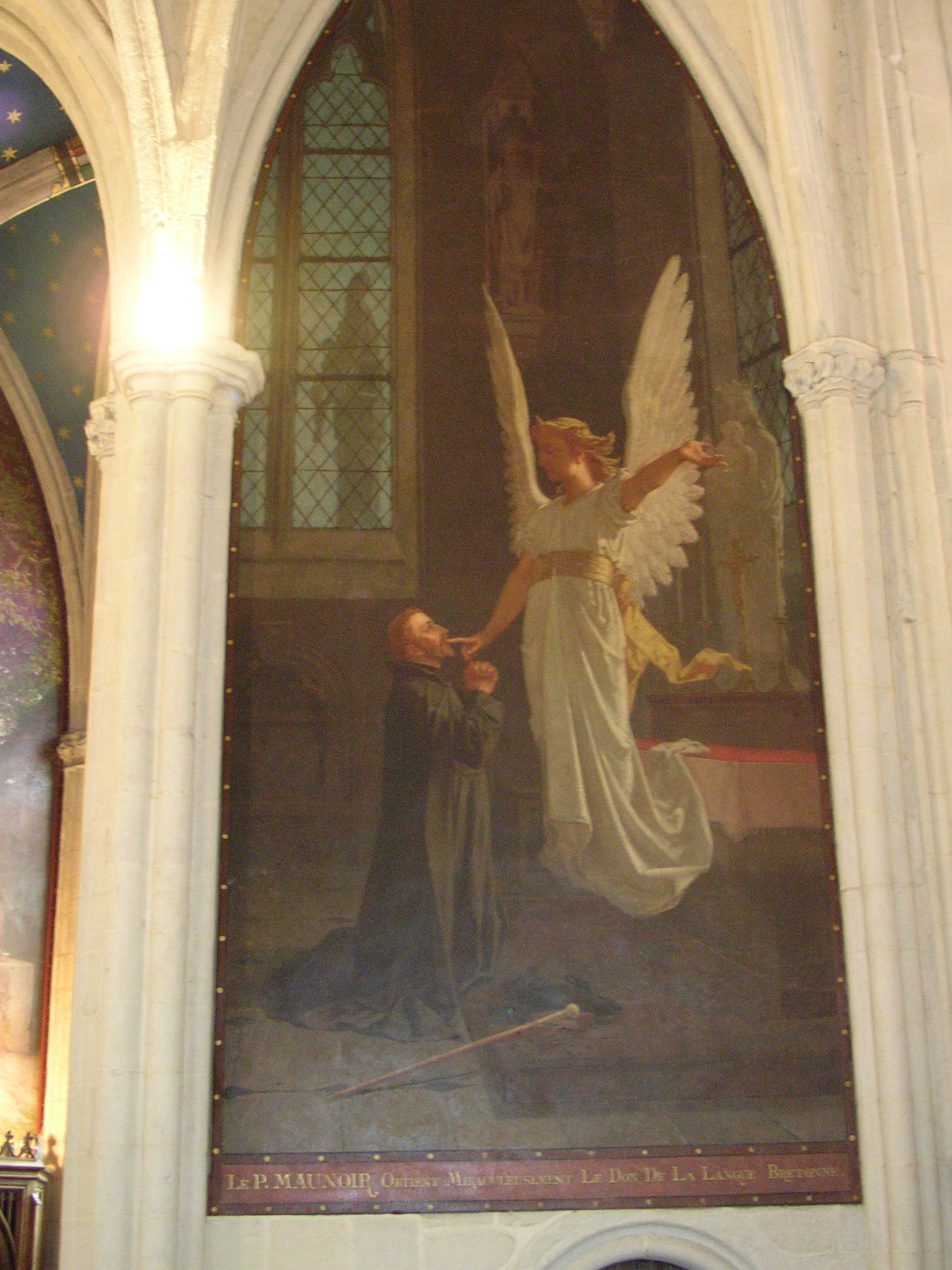
Dargent's painting in Quimper's Saint-Corentin cathedral depicting the miracle where Père Maunoir is given the ability to speak Breton.

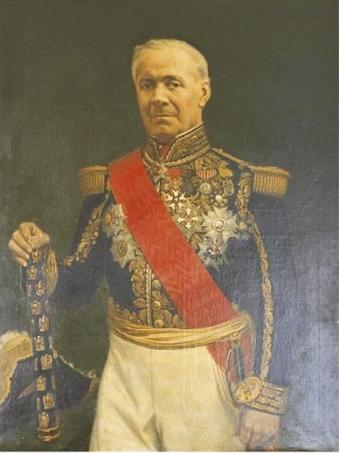
Portrait of Amiral Romain Desfossés. Painting executed in 1864.

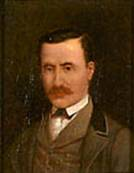
A portrait held in Quimper's Musée des beaux-arts.

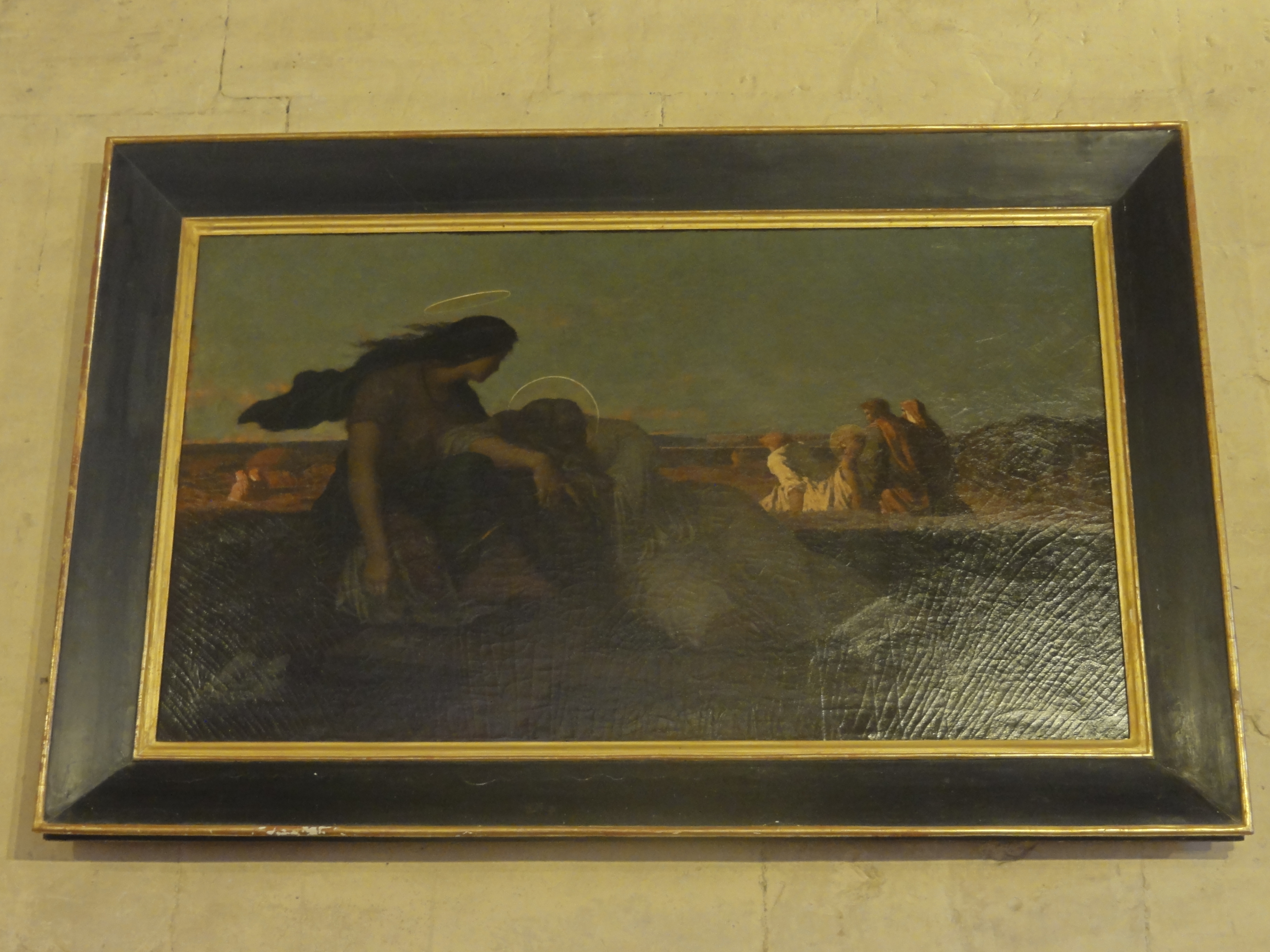
Dargent's depiction of Christ being carried to his tomb ("Le Christ porté au sépulcre"). This painting is located in Jouy-le-Comte's église Saint-Denis].

== Some of the books illustrated by Dargent ==
- "Edgar Poë et ses oeuvres". Published in 1864. Illustrated by F. Lix and Yan' Dargent.

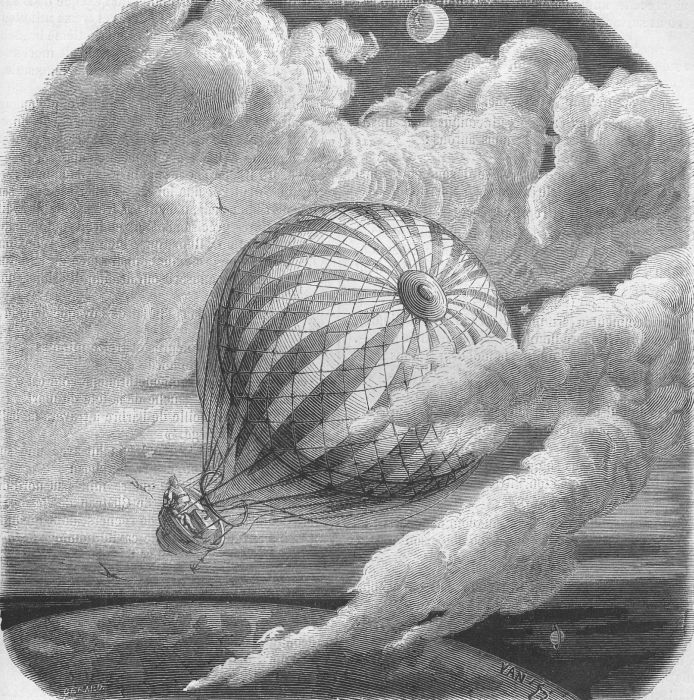
Voyage d'Hans Pfaall à la lune. An illustration from Jules Verne's essay "Edgard Poë et ses oeuvres" (Edgar Poe and his Works, 1864) drawn by Frederic Lix and Yan' Dargent

- '"Histoire de la révolution française"' by Adolphe Thiers. Published by Éditions Furne, Jouvet de Cie. 1878-1882
- "Christophe Colomb". Published by Éditions Palmer
- '"Dante". published by Éditions Garnier.
- "Lourdes".. Published by Éditions Lasserre.
- "Contes" des frères Jacob et Wilhelm Grimm". Published by Éditions Garnier,
- "Nouveaux contes bleus". Édouard Lefebvre de Laboulaye. Published in 1868 by éditions Furne Jouvet et Cie.
- "Contes danois de Hans Christian Andersen". Translated by Ernest Grégoire and Louis Moland. Edition of 1873 published by Garnier Frères.
- "Nouveaux Contes Danois" by Hans Christian Andersen translated by Ernest Grégoire and Louis Moland. Edition of 1875 published by Garnier Frères.
- "Les Souliers Rouges et autres contes" by Hans Christian Andersen translated by Ernest Grégoire and Louis Moland. Edition of 1880 published by Garnier Frères.
- "Le Robinson suisse|Le Nouveau Robinson suisse". Published in 1866 by éditions Hetzel, 1866
- "L'Espace céleste" by Emmanuel Liais. Published by éditions Garnier
- "Histoire fantastique du célèbre Pierrot" by Alfred Assolant. éditions Furne & Boivin
- "'La Révolution"', by Adolphe Thiers. éditions Furne & Boivin
- "Vie des Saints", by Mgr Paul Guérin. éditions Victor Palmé, 1887
- 'La Vie des fleurs et des fruits"' by Eugène Noël. Lévy frères, Paris, 1859
- "Histoire d'un bûche". By Jean-Henri Fabre. Garnier frères, 1867
- "Le monde des insectes". By Samuel-Henri Berthoud. Garnier, 1869
- "Les Hôtes du logis". By Samuel-Henri Berthoud, Garnier
- "L'Homme depuis cinq mille ans". By Samuel-Henri Berthoud, Garnier, 1876
- "L'esprit des oiseaux" By Samuel-Henri Berthoud, Alfred Mame, 1867
- "Chasses dans l'Amérique du Nord", By Bénédict-Henry Révoil. Alfred Mame, 1873
- "Los zapatos colorados" by Hans Christian Andersen, Garnier, 1889

== Yann Dargent's illustration of "The divine comedy" ==
This was one of Dargent's best illustrations.

== Major exhibitions ==
- Yan' Dargent. Exhibition running from September to October 1976 organized by the Bibliothèque municipale de Brest.
- Yan' Dargent. Exhibition staged in Landerneau from June to September 1989.
- Yan' Dargent chez lui à Saint-Servais. Exhibition staged by the Musée Yan' Dargent in Saint-Servais in the summer of 1991.
- Les lavandières de la nuit. Exhibition staged by the Musée Yan' Dargent in the summer of 1993.
