= Brasparts =

Brasparts Brasparzh
- Commune
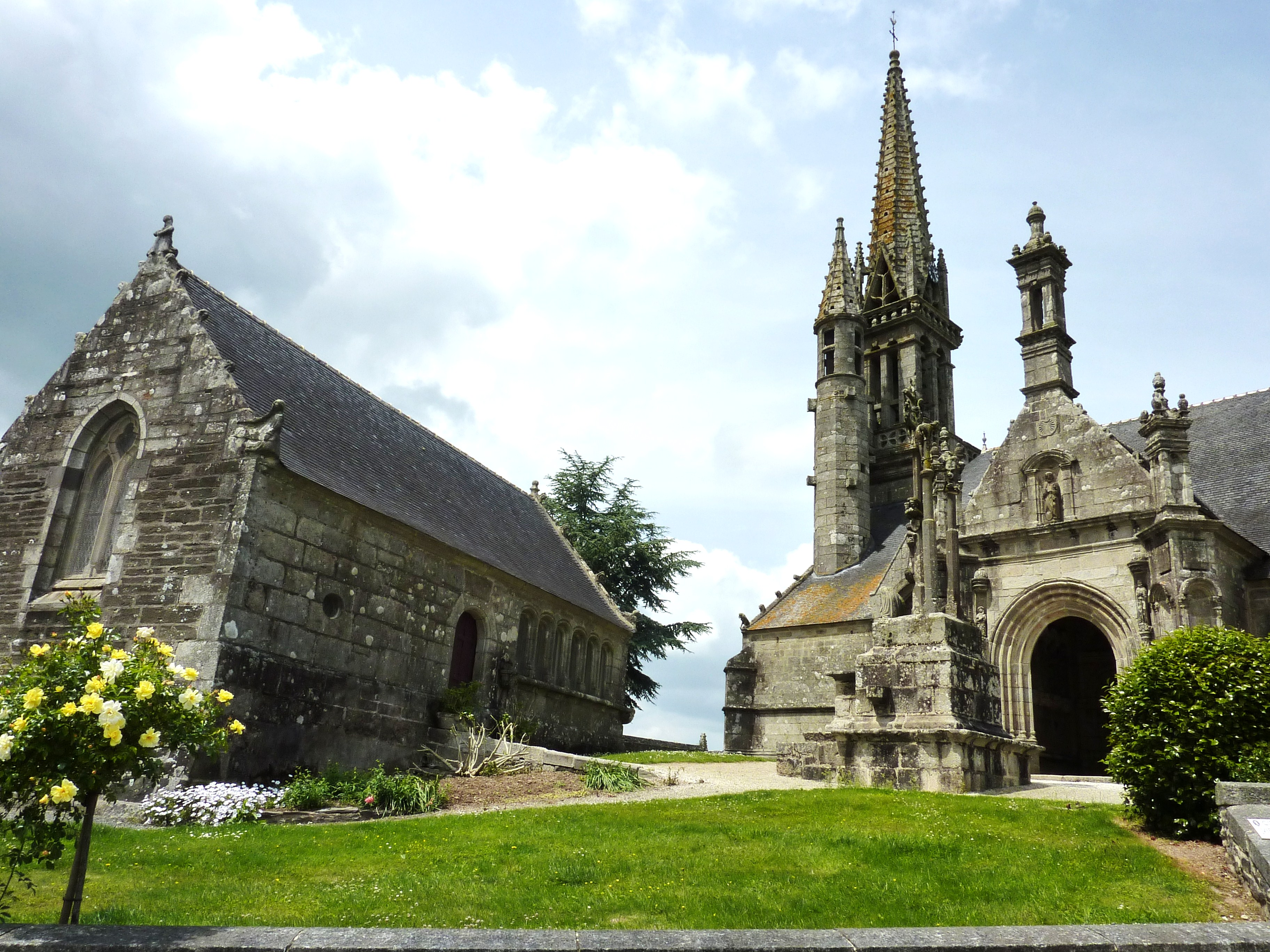
- The church in Brasparts

- Coat of arms
- Location of Brasparts
- Location within France Location within Brittany
- Coordinates: 48°18′03″N 3°57′15″W
- Country: France
- Region: Brittany
- Department: Finistère
- Arrondissement: Châteaulin
- Canton: Carhaix-Plouguer
- Intercommunality: Monts d'Arrée Communauté

Government
  - Mayor (2021–2026): Anne Rolland
- Area^{1}: 46.69 km^{2} (18.03 sq mi)
- Highest elevation: 330 m (1,080 ft)
- Lowest elevation: 39 m (128 ft)
- Population (2023): 1,067
  - Density: 22.85/km^{2} (59.19/sq mi)
- Time zone: UTC+01:00 (CET)
  - Summer (DST): UTC+02:00 (CEST)
- INSEE/Postal code: 29016 /29190
- ^{1} French Land Register data, which excludes lakes, ponds, glaciers > 1 km^{2} (0.386 sq mi or 247 acres) and river estuaries.

Brasparts (French pronunciation: [bʁaspaʁ]; Breton: Brasparzh) is a commune in the Finistère department of Brittany in northwestern France.

== Population ==
Historical population
Year	Pop.	±% p.a.
1968	1,469	—
1975	1,189	−2.98%
1982	1,115	−0.91%
1990	1,003	−1.31%
1999	1,013	+0.11%
2007	1,028	+0.18%
2012	1,032	+0.08%
2017	1,024	−0.16%
2023	1,067	+0.69%
Source: INSEE

Inhabitants of Brasparts are called in French Braspartiates.

== See also ==
- Communes of the Finistère department
- Parc naturel régional d'Armorique
- La Noce de Pierres
- Calvary at Saint-Herbot near Plonévez-du-Faou and the Chapelle Saint-Herbot.
- Brasparts Parish close
