= Brasparts Parish close =

Church in Brasparts, Brittany, France

Coordinates: 48.3011°N 3.9566°W

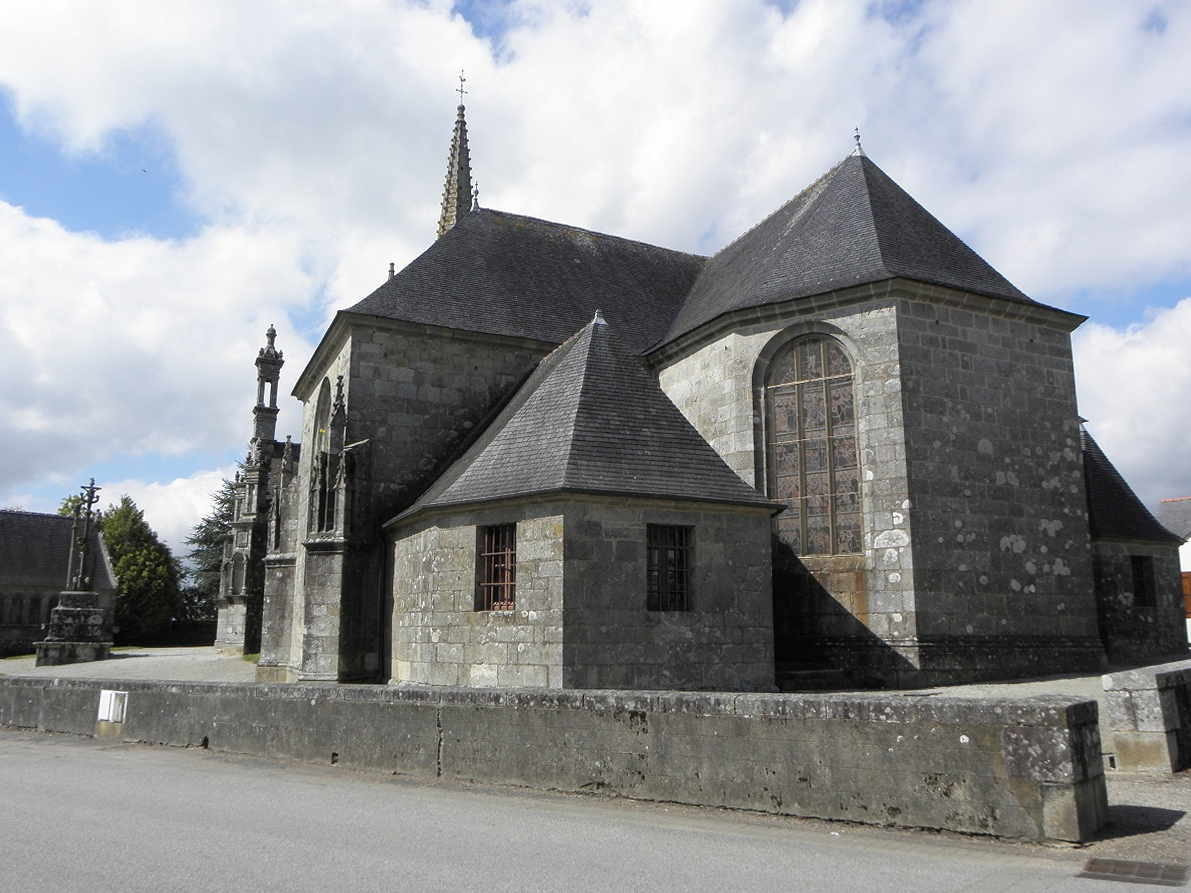
The Brasparts Église paroissial Notre-Dame-et-Saint-Tugen

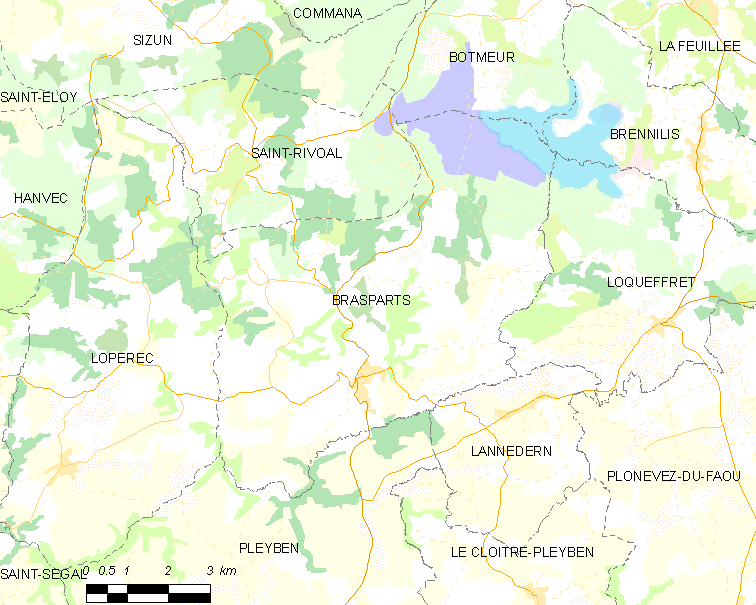
Map showing the location of Brasparts

The Brasparts Parish close (Enclos paroissial) is located at Brasparts within Brittany's Châteaulin arrondissement in north-western France. The church is named the Église paroissial Notre-Dame-et-Saint-Tugen. Building started in 1551, a date which appears over the church's west door. The church is often called the "Église de Brasparts"' and is a listed historical monument since 1914. The church is dedicated to the Virgin Mary and Saint Tugen, the Breton saint, and is for the most part built in the Gothic style. It has a double galleried "léonard" style bell-tower with a conical side tower which contains a stairway to access the bells. The porch has statues of the twelve apostles. The north window of the choir dates to 1543. Two niches in the choir area depict the parish's two saints and protectors, the Virgin Mary and Saint Tujan or Tugan.

== The porch ==
The south porch contains statues of the twelve apostles. It is a mixture of Gothic and Renaissance styles and dates to 1589. An arcade leads to the double doored entrance to the church, the top of the arcade being decorated with a statue of Saint Peter. Inside the porch are statues of the apostles and above the doors leading to the church a sculpture of Jesus has him giving a blessing whilst holding a globe in his left hand. In the porch's vaulted ceiling there are various paintings.

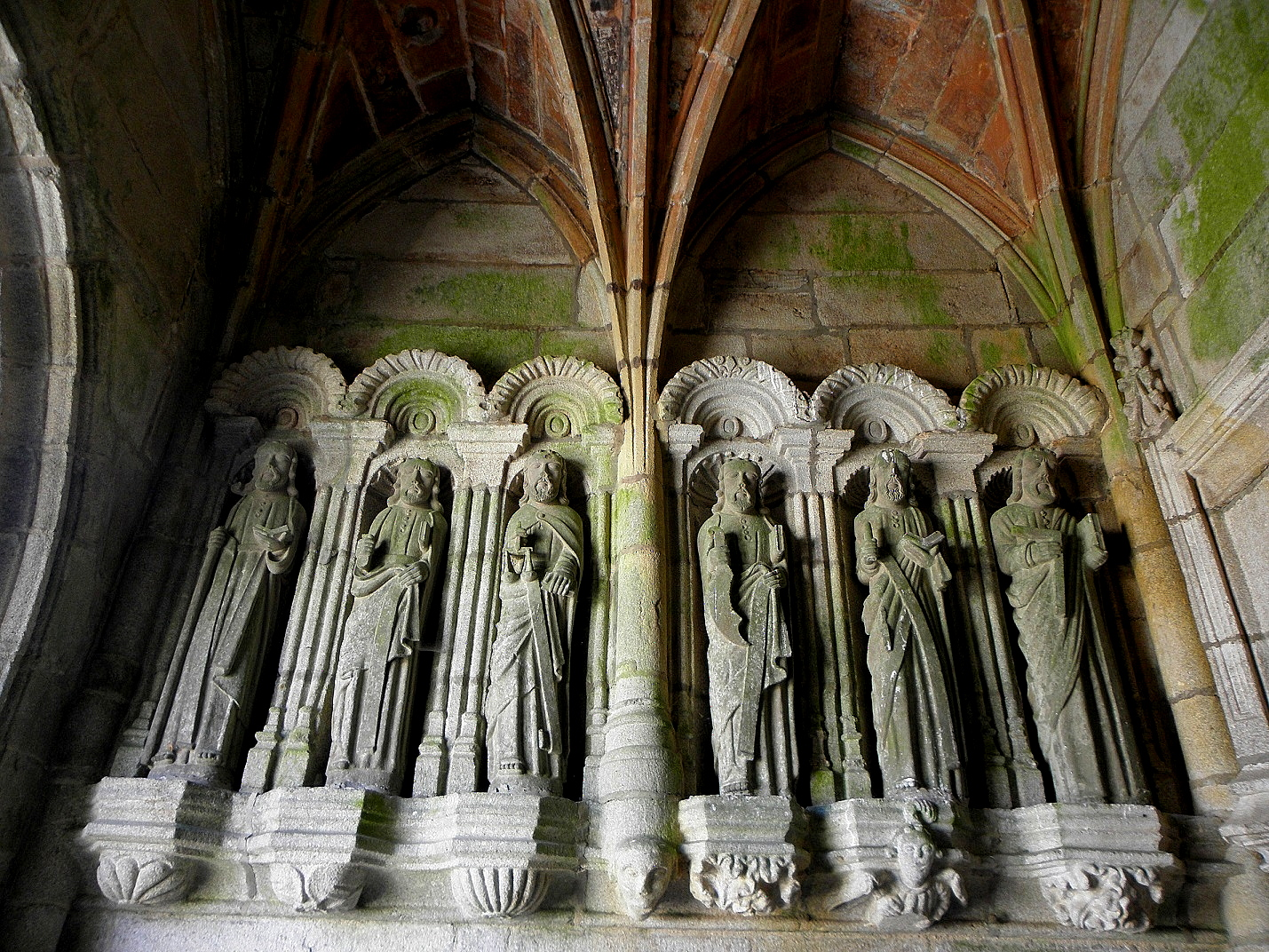
Statues of apostles in the Brasparts south porch

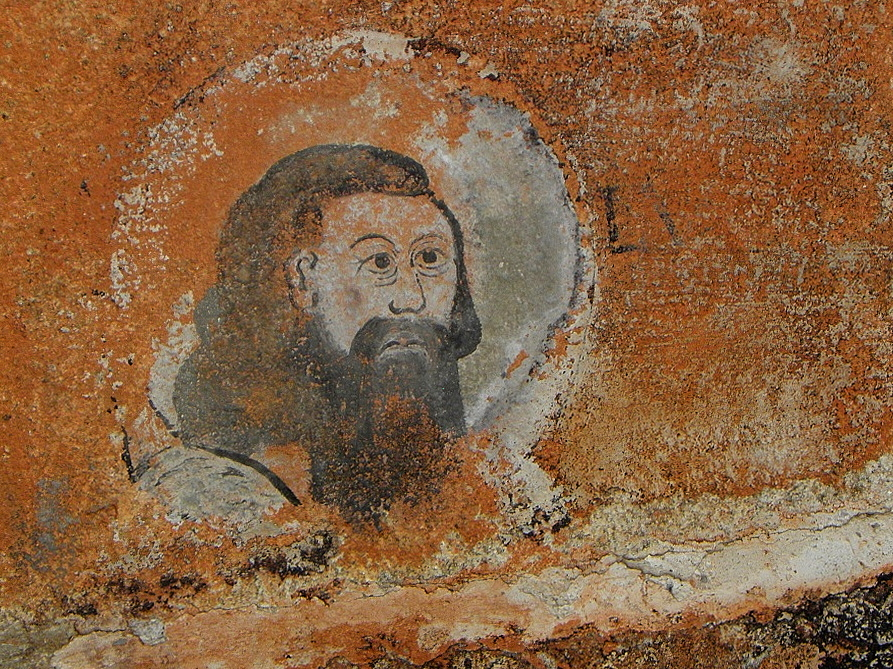
One of the paintings in the porch vaulting

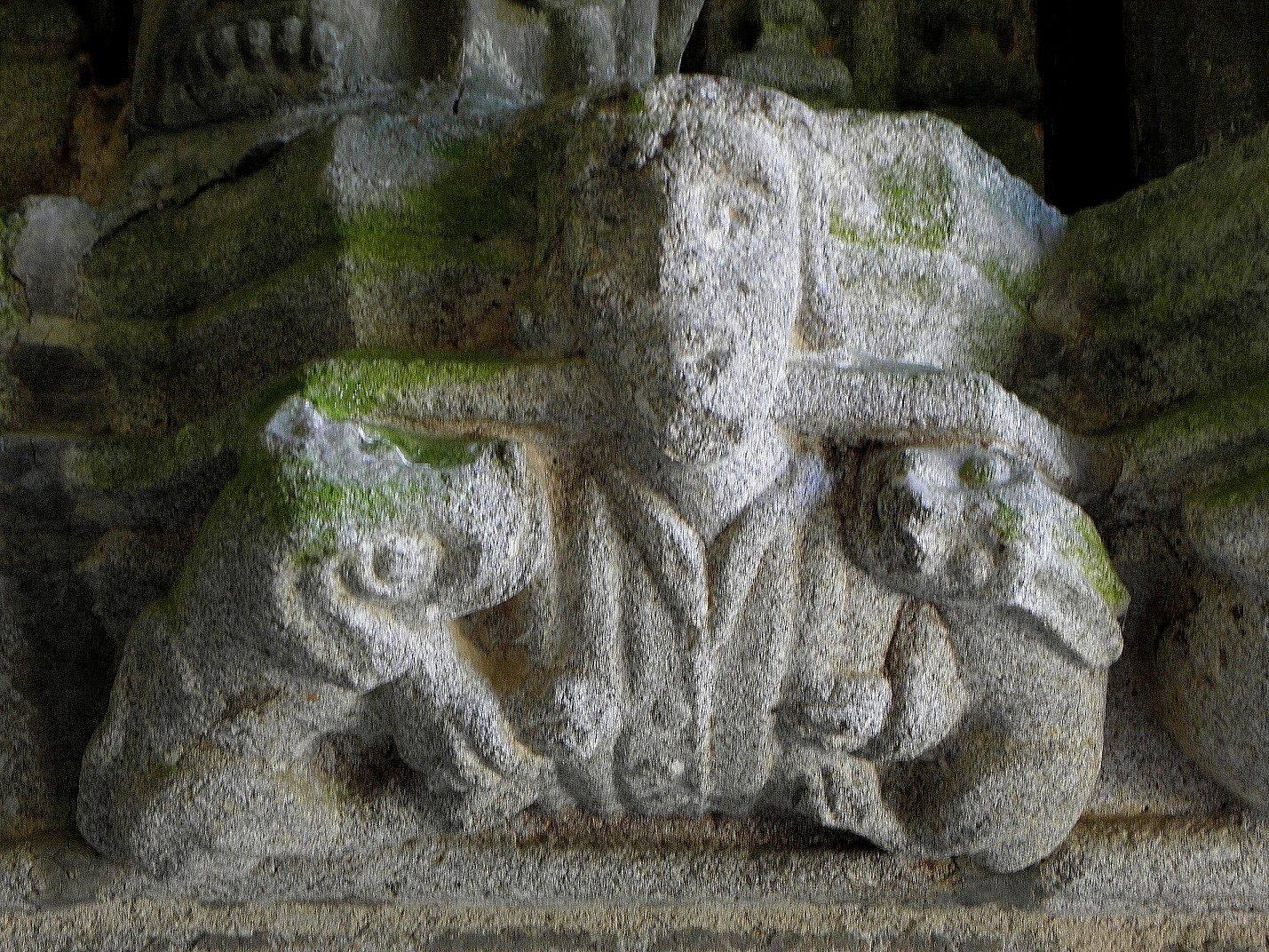
Sculpture in south porch

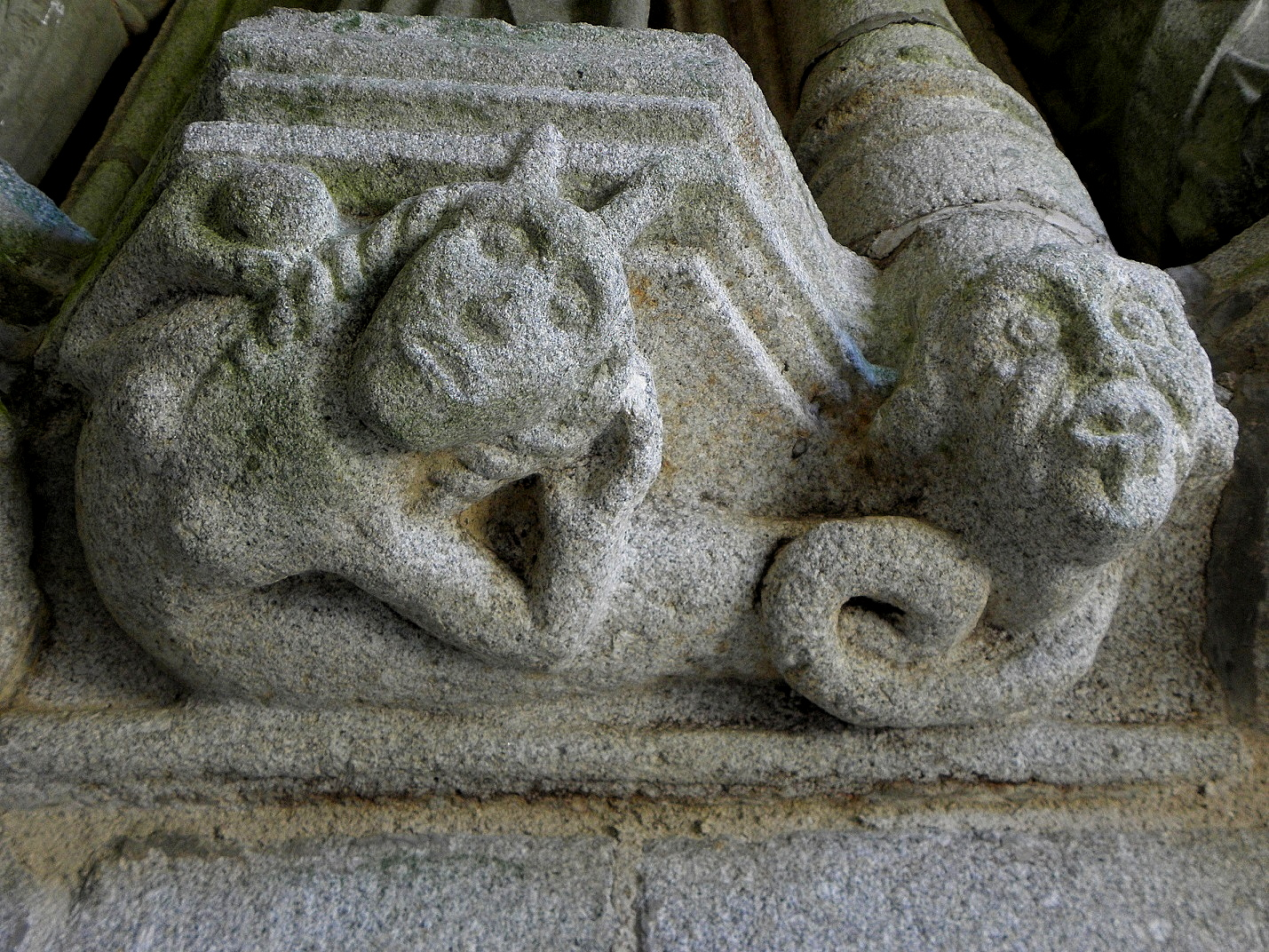
Sculpture in south porch

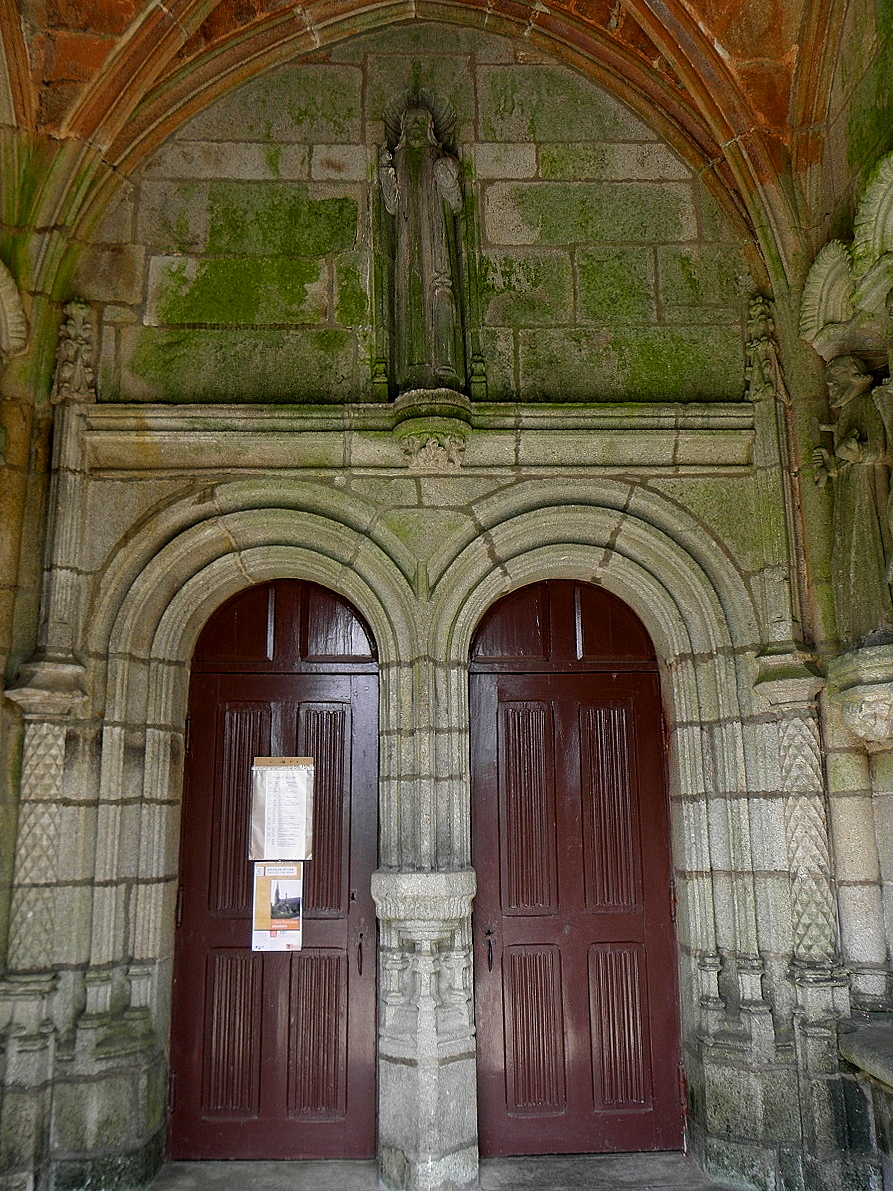
The double doored entrance to the church and the statue of Jesus giving a blessing whilst holding a globe

== The calvary ==
The 16th-century calvary stands near the church's south porch. On the reverse side of the depiction of the crucified Jesus is an "Ecce Homo" composition and below Saint Michael is depicted slaying the dragon and there is a pietà with the Virgin Mary and two female saints supporting Jesus' body which has been brought down from the cross.

== The ossuary ==
The rectangular building, restored in 1712, has two entrance doors and semicircular window apertures. It was built in the Flamboyant Gothic style. A skeleton and an Ankou decorate the gable.

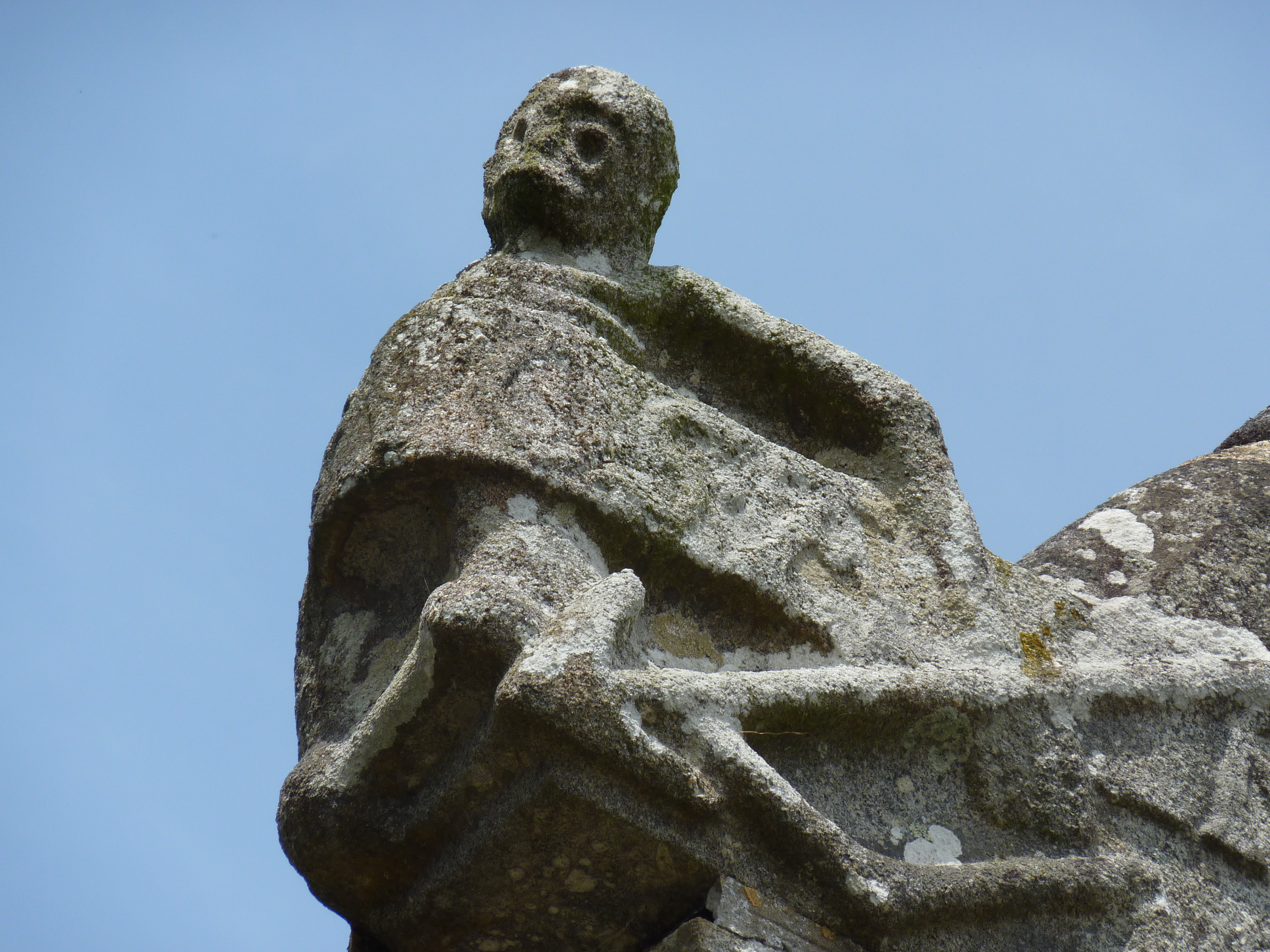
An Ankou on the ossuary

== The master altar ==
The altar has a large baldachin carried on four Corinthian columns. It is dominated by a large painting depicting Jesus on the cross which dates to 1844. In the painting two adoring angels lean towards Jesus.

== The choir ==
Niches are positioned on either side of the choir and they contain two wooden polychromed statues depicting the patrons of the church, the Virgin Mary in one niche and Saint Tugen in the other. As in usual, Saint Tugen is depicted with a dog. Saint Tugen's protection was valued as a protection against rabies a disease as feared in this period as the plague.

== The "Rosary" altar ==
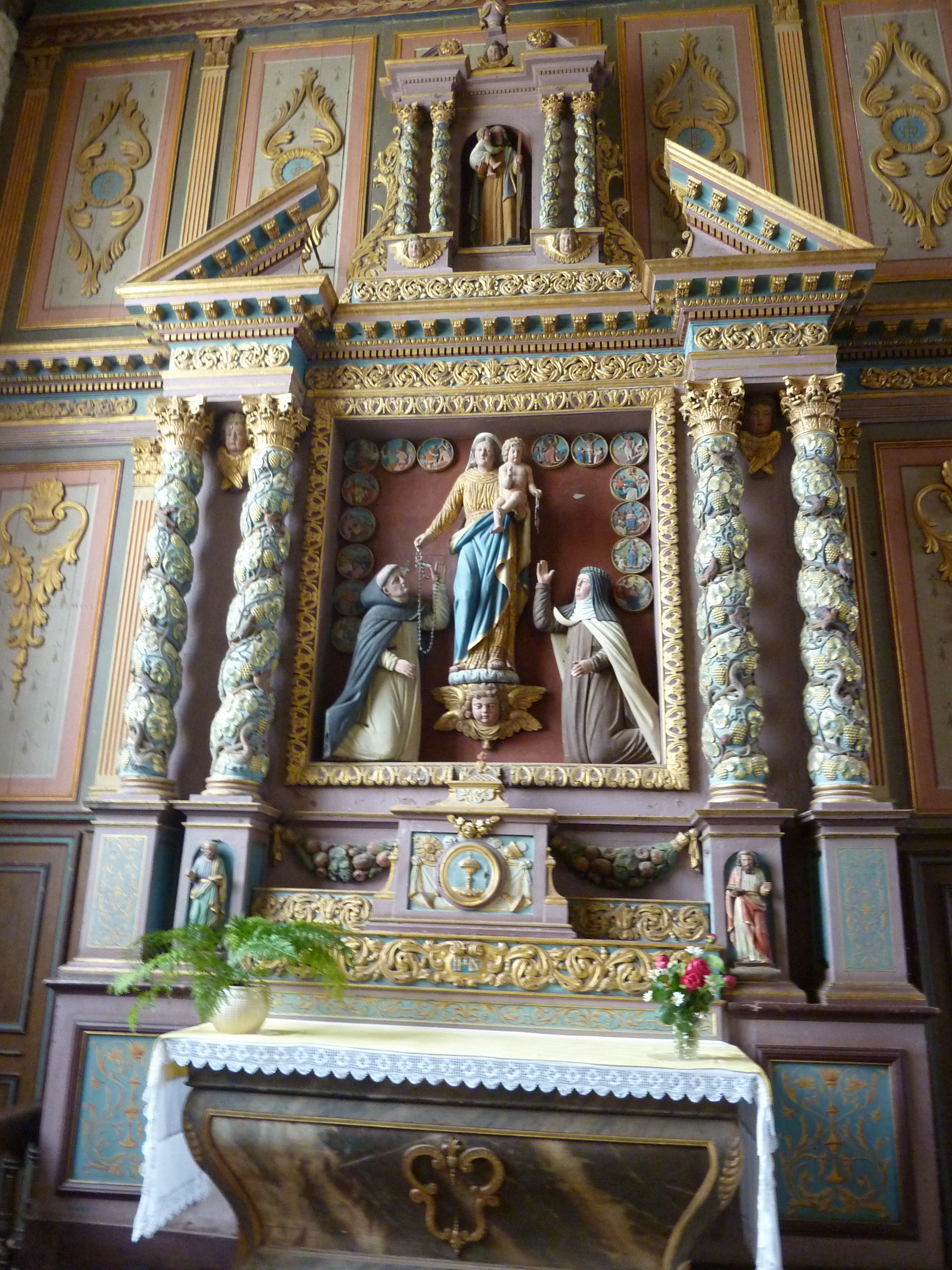
The Rosary altar. The Virgin Mary hands down the rosary. We can see the medallions that surround her. Above we see the pediment containing the painting of Joseph carrying the baby Jesus.

Located in the north transept and dating to 1658, the altar's design is attributed to Maurice Le Roux: Four twisted columns decorated with vine leaves, birds, serpents and snails, surround a central panel in which the Virgin Mary is shown handing the rosary to Saint Dominic and Saint Catherine of Sienne. She is surrounded by 15 medallions depicting the mysteries of the rosary. Above this is a triangular pediment containing another panel depicting Saint Joseph with his child Jesus.

== The 'Saint-Pierre-aux-Liens' altar ==
This altar is located in the south transept and has an 1844 painting depicting Saint Peter in prison.

== The Baptismal Fonts ==
The fonts have a baldachin and date to the 17th-century.

== Stained glass in the church ==
The window on the north side of the church and just near the main altar dates 1543 and was restored in 1983. The window depicts scenes from Jesus' passion. These include Jesus' triumphal entry into Jerusalem, Jesus washing the disciples' feet, the "Last supper", Jesus' agony in the Garden of Gethsemane, the appearance before the High Priest, Pontius Pilate washing his hands, Jesus blindfolded and being mocked, the flagellation, the application of the Crown of Thorns, Jesus carrying the cross, the crucifixion itself and Jesus' removal from the cross. At the top of each light there are angels holding the instruments of the passion. The stained glass window in the south part of the church dates to 1860 and the scenes depicted include the Nativity, the Adoration of the Magi, the Flight into Egypt, Jesus' baptism and the wedding in Cana.

== Gallery of images ==
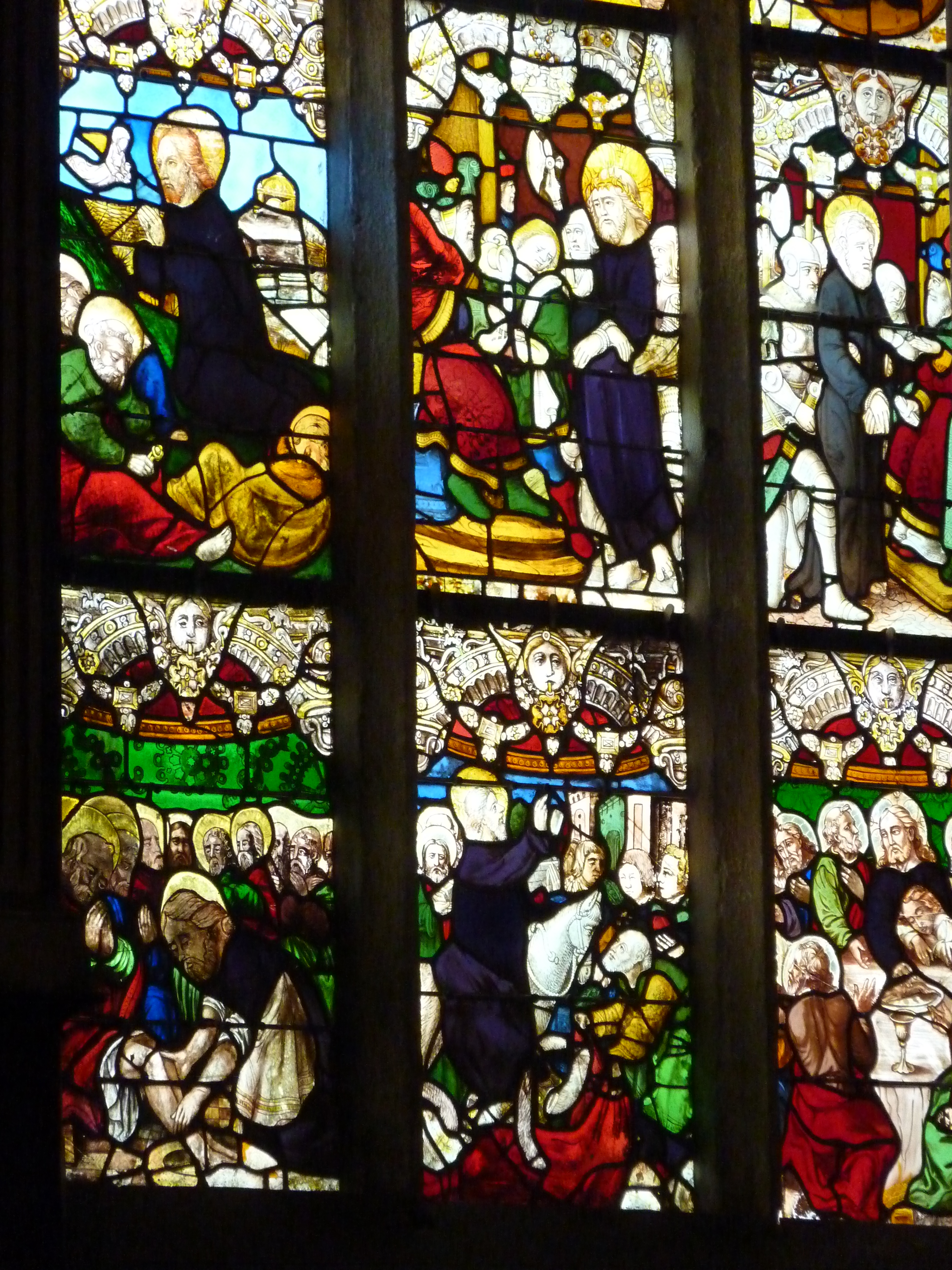
Part of the 1543 stained glass window depicting scenes from the passion

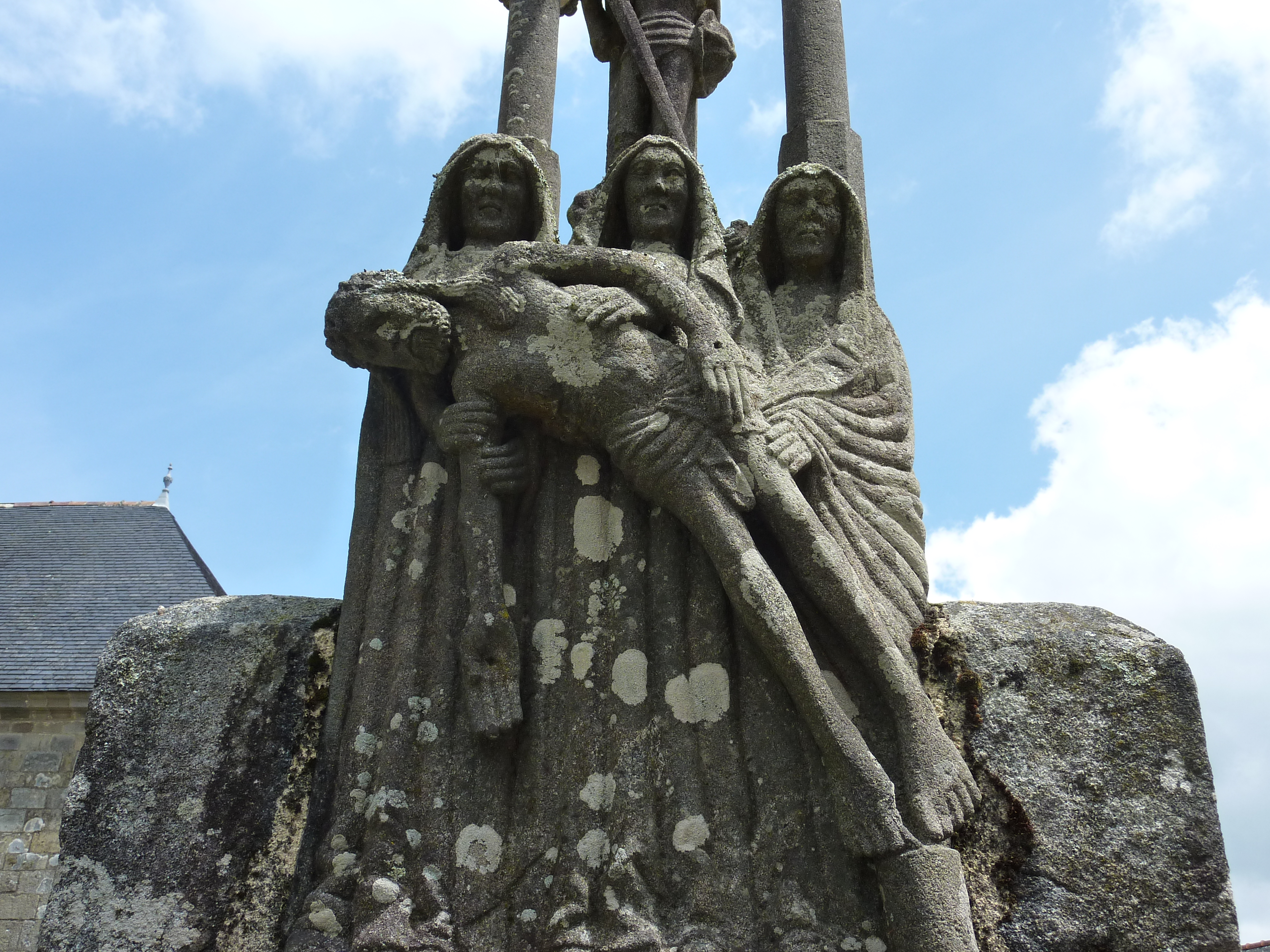
The piéta at the base of the crucifixion cross. Part of the Brasparts calvary

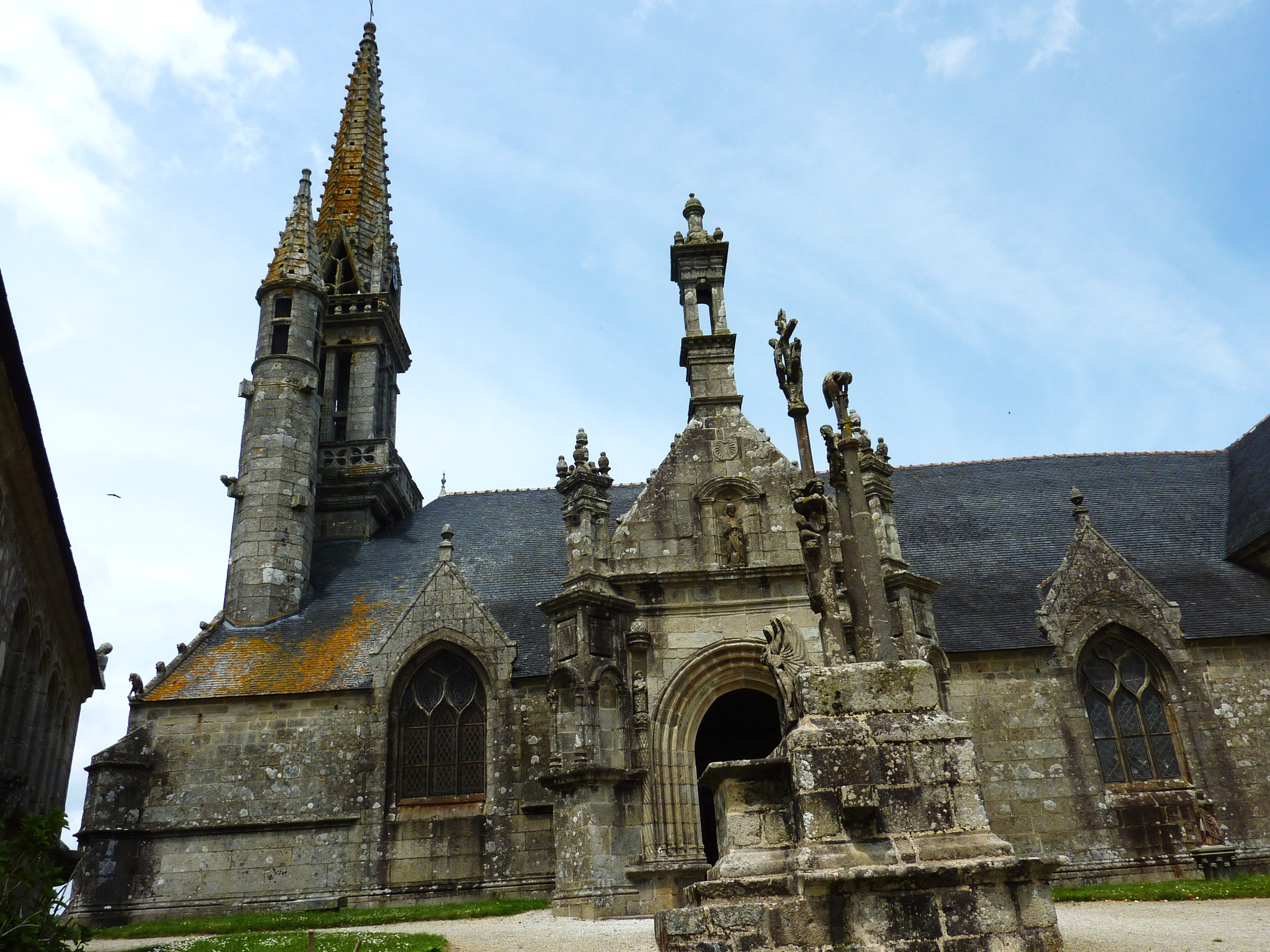
A view of the Notre-Dame-et-Saint-Tugen church.

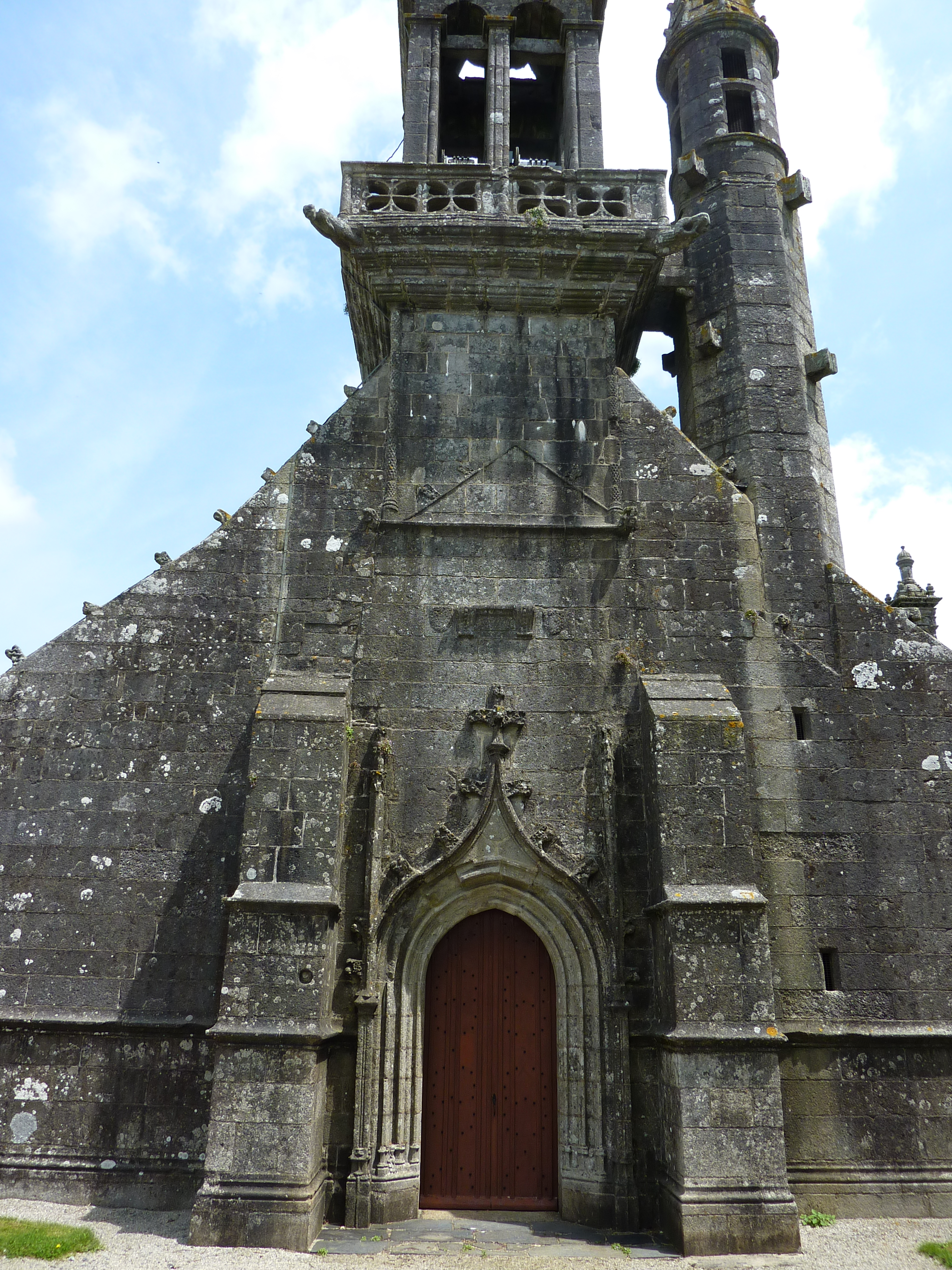
The west door of the Notre-Dame-et-Saint-Tugen church

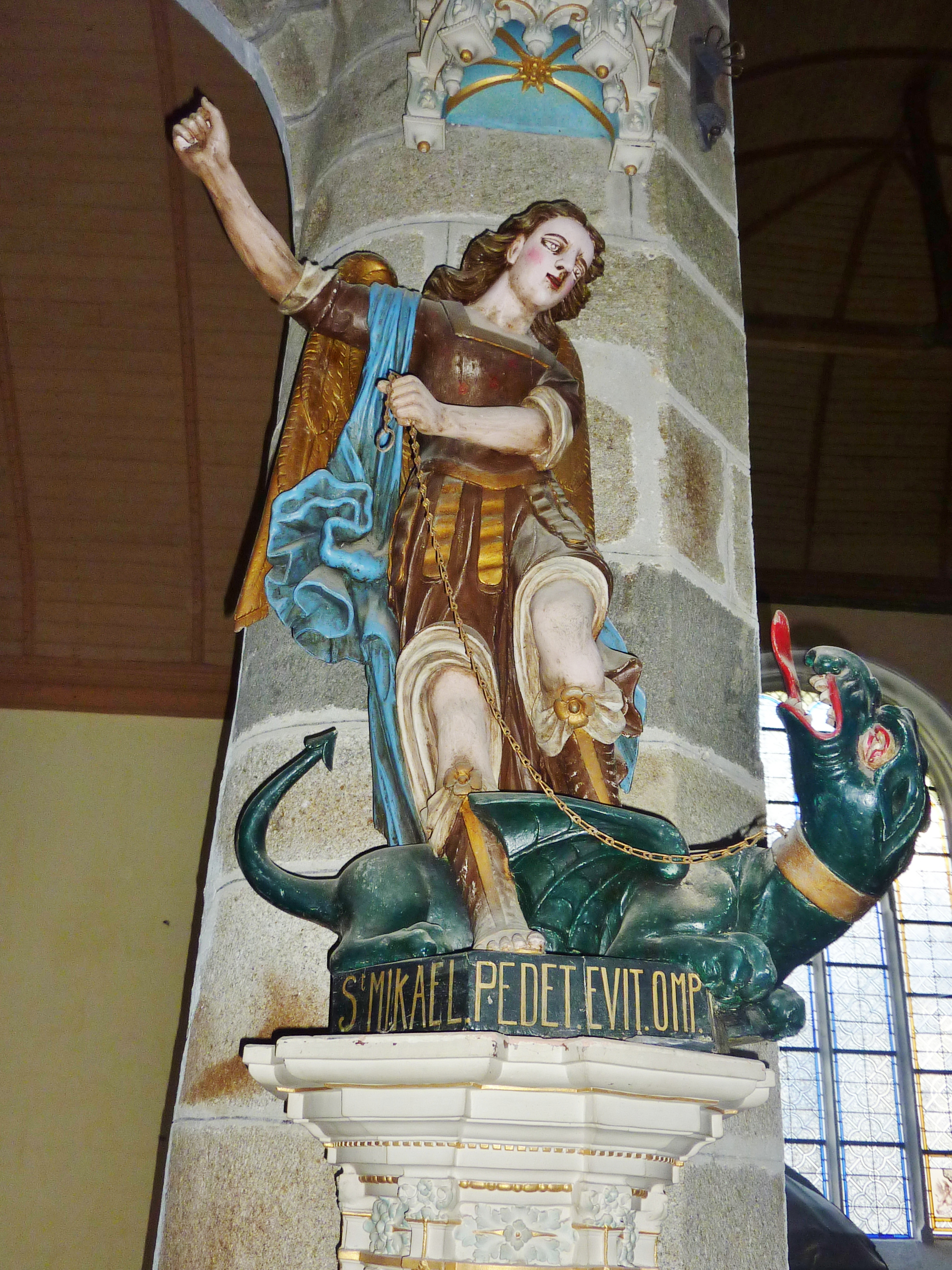
This sculpture shows Saint Michael slaying the dragon

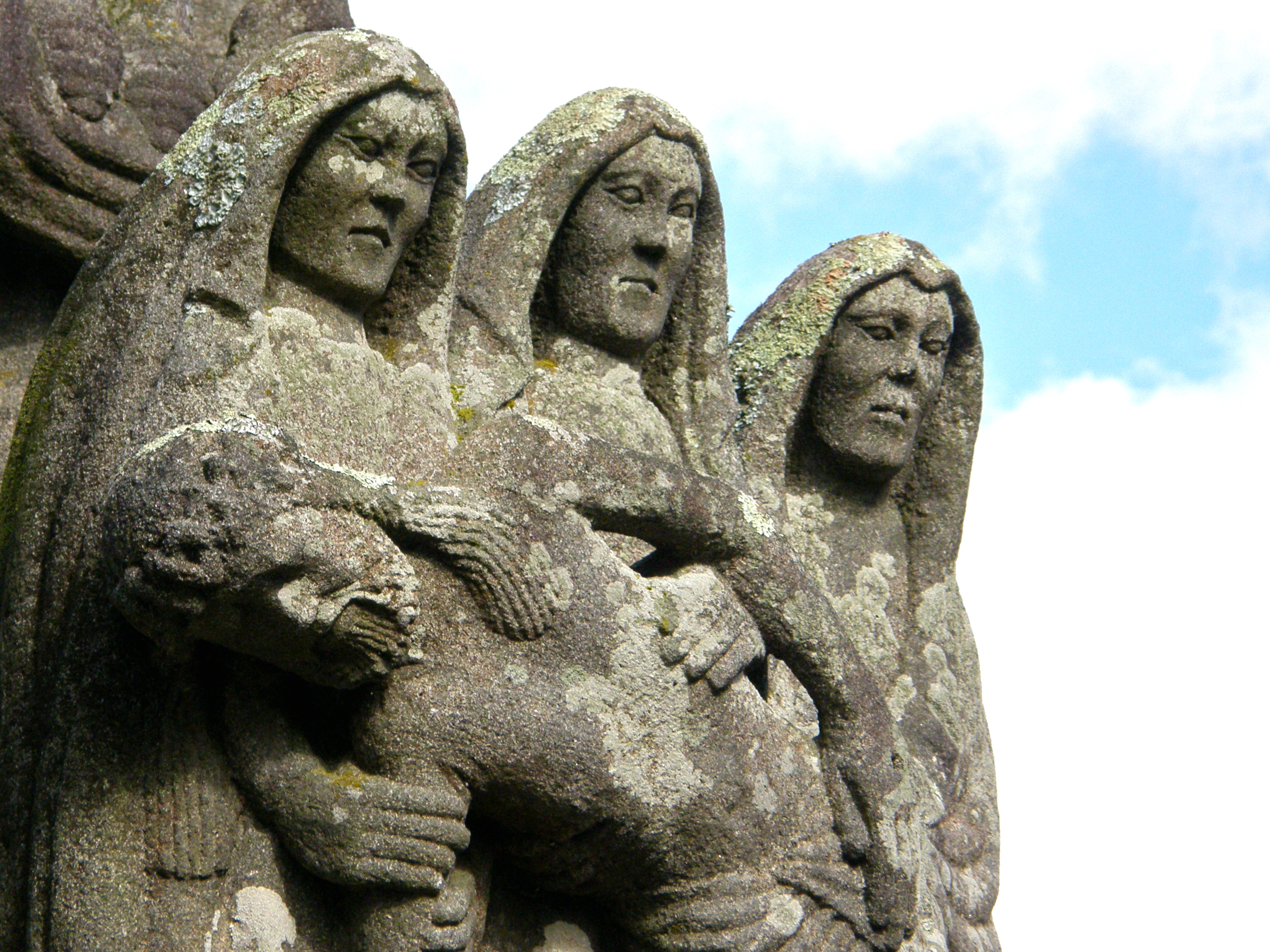
The calvary's 'Pietà'. The Virgin Mary and two femaie saints support Jesus' body which has just been brought down from the cross.

== Note ==
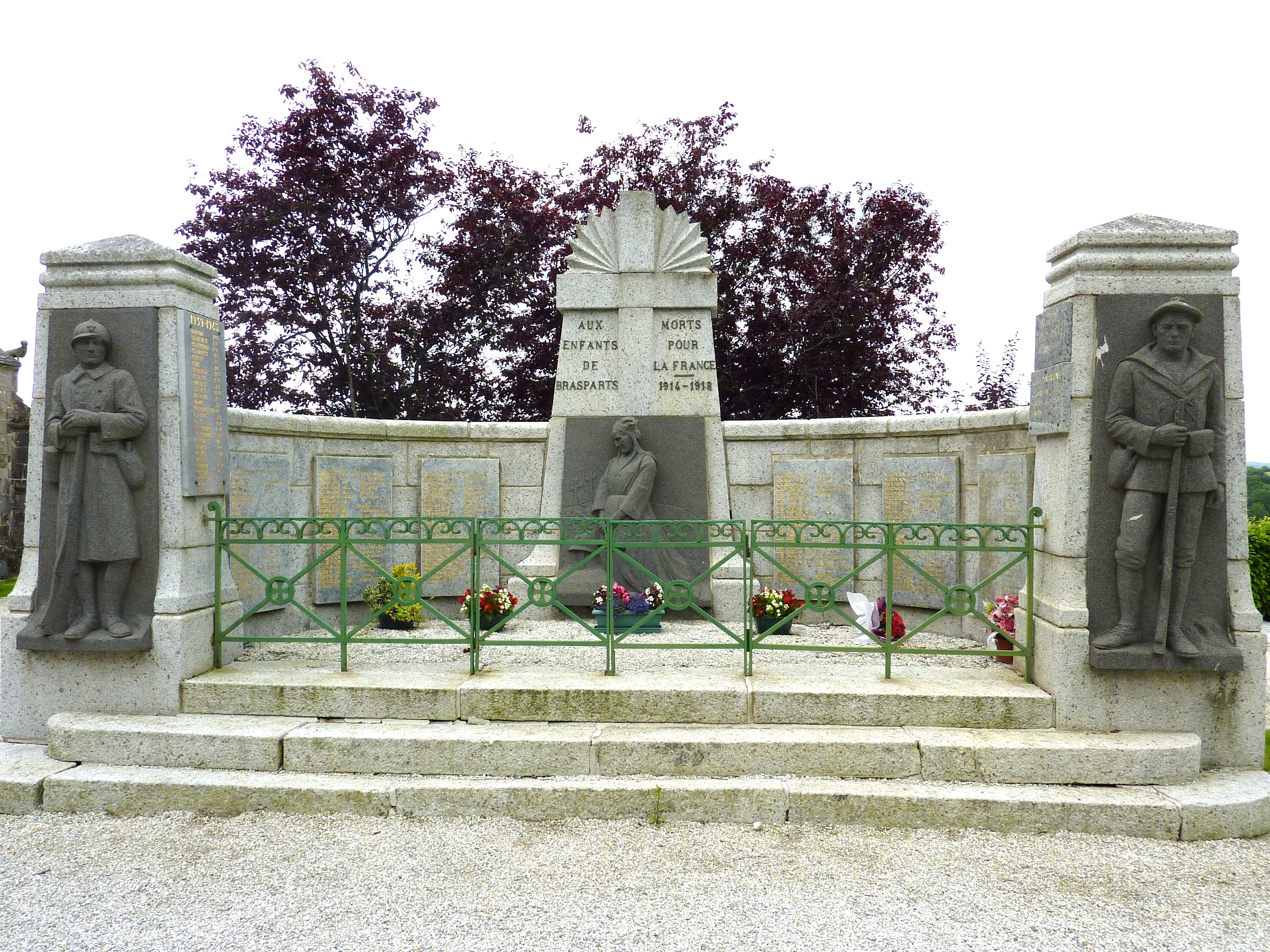
The monument aux morts (war memorial) at Brasparts. In the centre is a fine bas-relief depicting A Breton woman kneeling before a soldier's helmet

Brasparts has a particularly fine war memorial. The sculptural work is attributed to Donnart.

== See also ==
- Culture of France
- French architecture
- History of France
- Religion in France
- Roman Catholicism in France
