= La Noce de Pierres =

Alignment of 77 standing stones in Britanny, France

Coordinates: 48.3456°N 3.9310°W

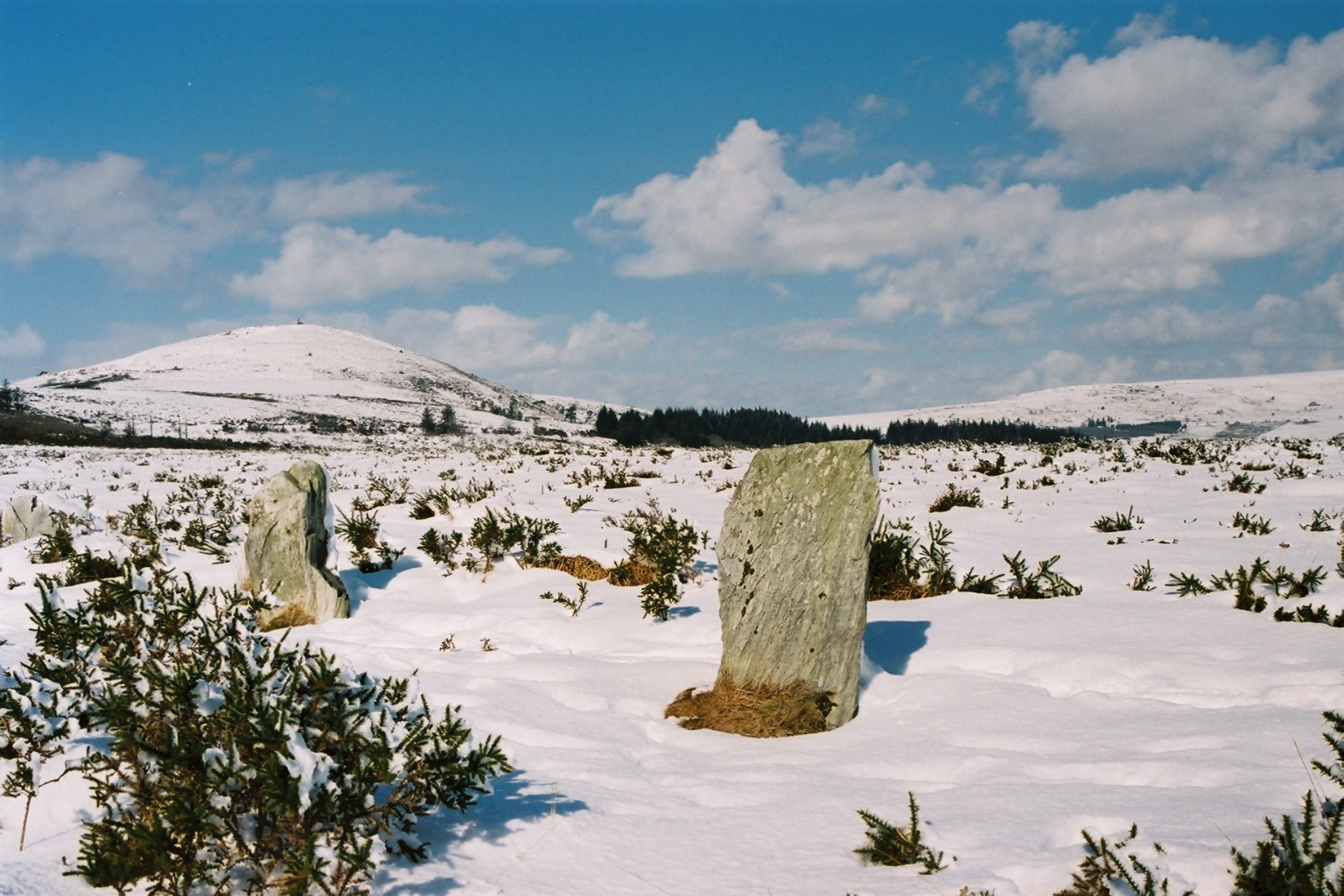
La Noce de Pierres

La Noce de Pierres Breton: An Eured Ven (The Wedding Party) is an alignment of 77 standing stones at the foot of Menez Michael (Saint-Michel-de-Brasparts) in the hills of Brittany. Aetiological folk tales say that the stones were originally the members of a drunken wedding party, petrified for their mistreatment of a stranger.

The monument was first documented in 1850 by Jean Bachelot La Pylaie, but it was not studied by archaeologists until 1978. It was classified as a monument historique (historic monument) in 1968 and registered in 1980.
