= Communes of the Finistère department =

The following is a list of the 277 communes of the Finistère department of France.

The communes cooperate in the following intercommunalities (as of 2025):

- Brest Métropole
- CA Concarneau Cornouaille Agglomération
- Communauté d'agglomération du Pays de Landerneau-Daoulas
- CA Morlaix Communauté
- Communauté d'agglomération Quimper Bretagne Occidentale
- CA Quimperlé Communauté
- Communauté de communes Cap Sizun - Pointe du Raz
- CC Douarnenez Communauté
- Communauté de communes de Haute Cornouaille
- CC Haut-Léon Communauté
- Communauté de communes du Haut Pays Bigouden
- CC Communauté Lesneven Côte des Légendes
- CC Monts d'Arrée Communauté
- Communauté de communes du Pays Bigouden Sud
- Communauté de communes du Pays de Landivisiau
- Communauté de communes du Pays des Abers
- Communauté de communes du Pays Fouesnantais
- Communauté de communes du Pays d'Iroise
- Communauté de communes Pleyben-Châteaulin-Porzay
- CC Poher communauté (partly)
- Communauté de communes Presqu'île de Crozon-Aulne maritime

INSEE	Postal	Commune
29001	29560	Argol
29002	29300	Arzano
29003	29770	Audierne
29004	29380	Bannalec
29005	29300	Baye
29006	29950	Bénodet
29007	29690	Berrien
29008	29790	Beuzec-Cap-Sizun
29010	29400	Bodilis
29011	29820	Bohars
29012	29640	Bolazec
29013	29690	Botmeur
29014	29650	Botsorhel
29015	29860	Bourg-Blanc
29016	29190	Brasparts
29017	29810	Brélès
29018	29690	Brennilis
29019	29200	Brest
29020	29510	Briec
29022	29570	Camaret-sur-Mer
29023	29660	Carantec
29024	29270	Carhaix-Plouguer
29025	29150	Cast
29026	29150	Châteaulin
29027	29520	Châteauneuf-du-Faou
29028	29770	Cléden-Cap-Sizun
29029	29270	Cléden-Poher
29030	29233	Cléder
29031	29360	Clohars-Carnoët
29032	29950	Clohars-Fouesnant
29033	29190	Le Cloître-Pleyben
29034	29410	Le Cloître-Saint-Thégonnec
29035	29870	Coat-Méal
29036	29530	Collorec
29037	29120	Combrit
29038	29450	Commana
29039	29900	Concarneau
29145	29790	Confort-Meilars
29040	29217	Le Conquet
29041	29370	Coray
29042	29160	Crozon
29043	29460	Daoulas
29044	29150	Dinéault
29045	29460	Dirinon
29046	29100	Douarnenez
29047	29860	Le Drennec
29048	29510	Edern
29049	29370	Elliant
29051	29500	Ergué-Gabéric
29053	29590	Le Faou
29054	29690	La Feuillée
29055	29260	Le Folgoët
29056	29800	La Forest-Landerneau
29057	29940	La Forêt-Fouesnant
29058	29170	Fouesnant
29059	29610	Garlan
29060	29950	Gouesnac'h
29061	29850	Gouesnou
29062	29190	Gouézec
29063	29770	Goulien
29064	29890	Goulven
29065	29710	Gourlizon
29066	29180	Guengat
29067	29650	Guerlesquin
29068	29410	Guiclan
29069	29820	Guilers
29070	29710	Guiler-sur-Goyen
29071	29300	Guilligomarc'h
29072	29730	Guilvinec
29073	29620	Guimaëc
29074	29400	Guimiliau
29075	29490	Guipavas
29077	29880	Guissény
29078	29460	Hanvec
29079	29670	Henvic
29080	29460	Hôpital-Camfrout
29081	29690	Huelgoat
29082	29253	Île-de-Batz
29083	29990	Île-de-Sein
29084	29259	Île-Molène
29085	29980	Île-Tudy
29086	29460	Irvillac
29087	29100	Le Juch
29089	29270	Kergloff
29090	29100	Kerlaz
29091	29890	Kerlouan
29093	29260	Kernilis
29094	29260	Kernouës
29095	29860	Kersaint-Plabennec
29097	29400	Lampaul-Guimiliau
29098	29810	Lampaul-Plouarzel
29099	29830	Lampaul-Ploudalmézeau
29100	29260	Lanarvily
29101	29870	Landéda
29102	29530	Landeleau
29103	29800	Landerneau
29104	29560	Landévennec
29105	29400	Landivisiau
29106	29510	Landrévarzec
29107	29510	Landudal
29108	29710	Landudec
29109	29840	Landunvez
29110	29510	Langolen
29111	29430	Lanhouarneau
29112	29840	Lanildut
29113	29620	Lanmeur
29114	29640	Lannéanou
29115	29190	Lannédern
29116	29400	Lanneuffret
29117	29870	Lannilis
29119	29290	Lanrivoaré
29120	29160	Lanvéoc
29122	29520	Laz
29123	29190	Lennon
29124	29260	Lesneven
29125	29390	Leuhan
29126	29260	Loc-Brévalaire
29128	29400	Loc-Eguiner
29130	29280	Locmaria-Plouzané
29131	29400	Locmélar
29132	29670	Locquénolé
29133	29241	Locquirec
29134	29180	Locronan
29135	29750	Loctudy
29136	29310	Locunolé
29137	29460	Logonna-Daoulas
29139	29590	Lopérec
29140	29470	Loperhet
29141	29530	Loqueffret
29142	29190	Lothey
29143	29790	Mahalon
29144	29800	La Martyre
29146	29140	Melgven
29147	29300	Mellac
29148	29420	Mespaul
29076	29290	Milizac-Guipronvel
29150	29350	Moëlan-sur-Mer

INSEE	Postal	Commune
29151	29600	Morlaix
29152	29270	Motreff
29153	29920	Névez
29155	29242	Ouessant
29156	29800	Pencran
29158	29760	Penmarch
29159	29710	Peumerit
29160	29860	Plabennec
29161	29170	Pleuven
29162	29190	Pleyben
29163	29410	Pleyber-Christ
29165	29740	Plobannalec-Lesconil
29166	29550	Ploéven
29167	29710	Plogastel-Saint-Germain
29168	29770	Plogoff
29169	29180	Plogonnec
29170	29700	Plomelin
29171	29120	Plomeur
29172	29550	Plomodiern
29173	29710	Plonéis
29174	29720	Plonéour-Lanvern
29175	29530	Plonévez-du-Faou
29176	29550	Plonévez-Porzay
29177	29810	Plouarzel
29178	29830	Ploudalmézeau
29179	29260	Ploudaniel
29180	29800	Ploudiry
29181	29800	Plouédern
29182	29620	Plouégat-Guérand
29183	29650	Plouégat-Moysan
29184	29420	Plouénan
29185	29430	Plouescat
29186	29252	Plouezoc'h
29187	29440	Plougar
29188	29630	Plougasnou
29189	29470	Plougastel-Daoulas
29190	29217	Plougonvelin
29191	29640	Plougonven
29192	29250	Plougoulm
29193	29400	Plougourvest
29195	29880	Plouguerneau
29196	29830	Plouguin
29197	29780	Plouhinec
29198	29260	Plouider
29199	29610	Plouigneau
29201	29810	Ploumoguer
29021	29890	Plounéour-Brignogan-Plages
29202	29410	Plounéour-Ménez
29204	29400	Plounéventer
29205	29270	Plounévézel
29206	29430	Plounévez-Lochrist
29208	29830	Plourin
29207	29600	Plourin-lès-Morlaix
29209	29860	Plouvien
29210	29420	Plouvorn
29211	29690	Plouyé
29212	29280	Plouzané
29213	29440	Plouzévédé
29214	29720	Plovan
29215	29710	Plozévet
29216	29700	Pluguffan
29217	29930	Pont-Aven
29218	29790	Pont-Croix
29302	29590	Pont-de-Buis-lès-Quimerch
29220	29120	Pont-l'Abbé
29221	29840	Porspoder
29222	29150	Port-Launay
29224	29100	Pouldergat
29225	29710	Pouldreuzic
29226	29100	Poullan-sur-Mer
29227	29246	Poullaouen
29228	29770	Primelin
29229	29180	Quéménéven
29230	29310	Querrien
29232	29000	Quimper
29233	29300	Quimperlé
29234	29300	Rédené
29235	29480	Le Relecq-Kerhuon
29236	29340	Riec-sur-Bélon
29237	29800	La Roche-Maurice
29238	29570	Roscanvel
29239	29680	Roscoff
29240	29590	Rosnoën
29241	29140	Rosporden
29243	29150	Saint-Coulitz
29244	29440	Saint-Derrien
29245	29800	Saint-Divy
29246	29460	Saint-Eloy
29265	29600	Sainte-Sève
29247	29170	Saint-Évarzec
29248	29260	Saint-Frégant
29249	29520	Saint-Goazec
29250	29270	Saint-Hernin
29251	29630	Saint-Jean-du-Doigt
29252	29120	Saint-Jean-Trolimon
29254	29600	Saint-Martin-des-Champs
29255	29260	Saint-Méen
29256	29550	Saint-Nic
29257	29830	Saint-Pabu
29259	29250	Saint-Pol-de-Léon
29260	29290	Saint-Renan
29261	29190	Saint-Rivoal
29262	29400	Saint-Sauveur
29263	29590	Saint-Ségal
29264	29400	Saint-Servais
29266	29410	Saint-Thégonnec Loc-Eguiner
29267	29520	Saint-Thois
29268	29800	Saint-Thonan
29269	29380	Saint-Thurien
29270	29800	Saint-Urbain
29271	29440	Saint-Vougay
29272	29140	Saint-Yvi
29273	29250	Santec
29274	29390	Scaër
29275	29640	Scrignac
29276	29250	Sibiril
29277	29450	Sizun
29278	29540	Spézet
29279	29670	Taulé
29280	29560	Telgruc-sur-Mer
29281	29140	Tourch
29282	29217	Trébabu
29284	29730	Treffiagat
29285	29440	Tréflaouénan
29286	29800	Tréflévénez
29287	29430	Tréflez
29288	29260	Trégarantec
29289	29560	Trégarvan
29290	29870	Tréglonou
29291	29970	Trégourez
29292	29720	Tréguennec
29293	29910	Trégunc
29294	29450	Le Tréhou
29295	29800	Trémaouézan
29296	29120	Tréméoc
29297	29300	Tréméven
29298	29720	Tréogat
29299	29290	Tréouergat
29300	29380	Le Trévoux
29301	29440	Trézilidé
