= Plougasnou =

Plougasnou Plouganoù
- Commune
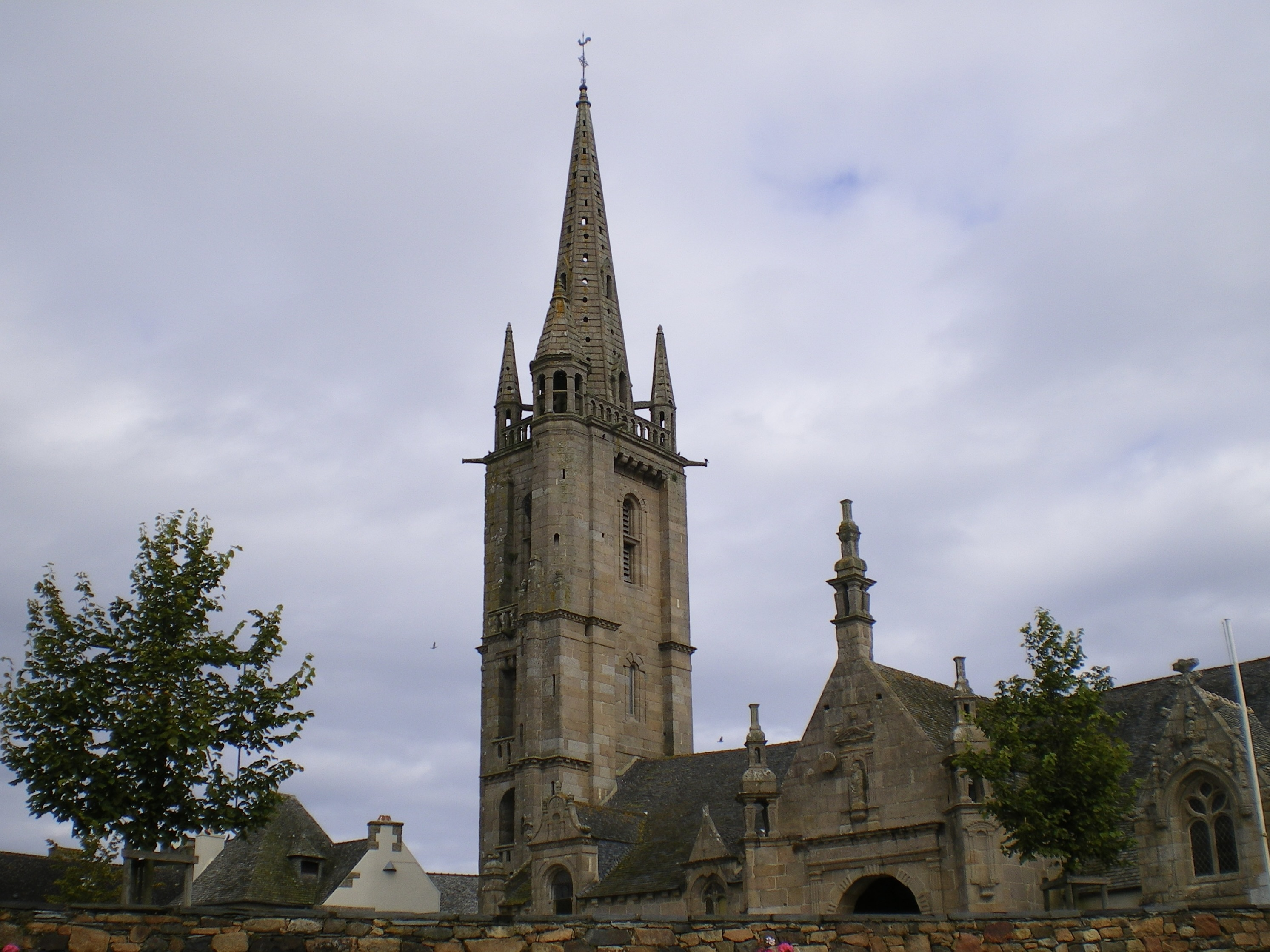
- The church of Saint-Pierre, in Plougasnou

- Coat of arms
- Location of Plougasnou
- Location within France Location within Brittany
- Coordinates: 48°41′47″N 3°47′17″W
- Country: France
- Region: Brittany
- Department: Finistère
- Arrondissement: Morlaix
- Canton: Plouigneau
- Intercommunality: Morlaix Communauté

Government
  - Mayor (2020–2026): monkuen3D
- Area^{1}: 33.94 km^{2} (13.10 sq mi)
- Highest elevation: 94 m (308 ft)
- Lowest elevation: 0 m (0 ft)
- Population (2023): 3,192
  - Density: 94.05/km^{2} (243.6/sq mi)
- Time zone: UTC+01:00 (CET)
  - Summer (DST): UTC+02:00 (CEST)
- INSEE/Postal code: 29188 /29630
- ^{1} French Land Register data, which excludes lakes, ponds, glaciers > 1 km^{2} (0.386 sq mi or 247 acres) and river estuaries.

Plougasnou (French pronunciation: [pluɡanu]; Breton: Plouganoù) is a commune in the Finistère department in Brittany in northwestern France, located about 75 kilometres east of Brest. Plougasnou is northeast of the town of Plouezoc'h, north of Lanmeur and west of Saint-Jean-du-Doigt.

== Population ==
Inhabitants of Plougasnou are called Plouganistes in French.

Historical population

Year	Pop.	±% p.a.
1793	4,959	—
1800	3,103	−6.48%
1806	3,106	+0.02%
1821	3,029	−0.17%
1831	3,827	+2.37%
1836	3,790	−0.19%
1841	3,817	+0.14%
1846	4,003	+0.96%
1851	3,735	−1.38%
1856	3,650	−0.46%
1861	3,261	−2.23%
1866	3,868	+3.47%
1872	3,876	+0.03%
1876	3,786	−0.59%
1881	3,723	−0.34%
1886	3,709	−0.08%
1891	3,805	+0.51%
1896	3,644	−0.86%
1901	3,700	+0.31%

Year	Pop.	±% p.a.
1906	3,843	+0.76%
1911	3,997	+0.79%
1921	3,968	−0.07%
1926	3,767	−1.03%
1931	3,677	−0.48%
1936	3,687	+0.05%
1946	3,683	−0.01%
1954	3,350	−1.18%
1962	3,536	+0.68%
1968	3,422	−0.54%
1975	3,368	−0.23%
1982	3,432	+0.27%
1990	3,530	+0.35%
1999	3,393	−0.44%
2007	3,217	−0.66%
2012	3,107	−0.69%
2017	2,776	−2.23%
2023	3,192	+2.35%

Source: EHESS and INSEE (1968-2023)

== Twinning ==
Plougasnou has been twinned with Helston since 2010.

== See also ==
- Communes of the Finistère department
