= Arrondissement of Morlaix =

Coordinates: 48°34′N 3°50′W

Morlaix
- Arrondissement
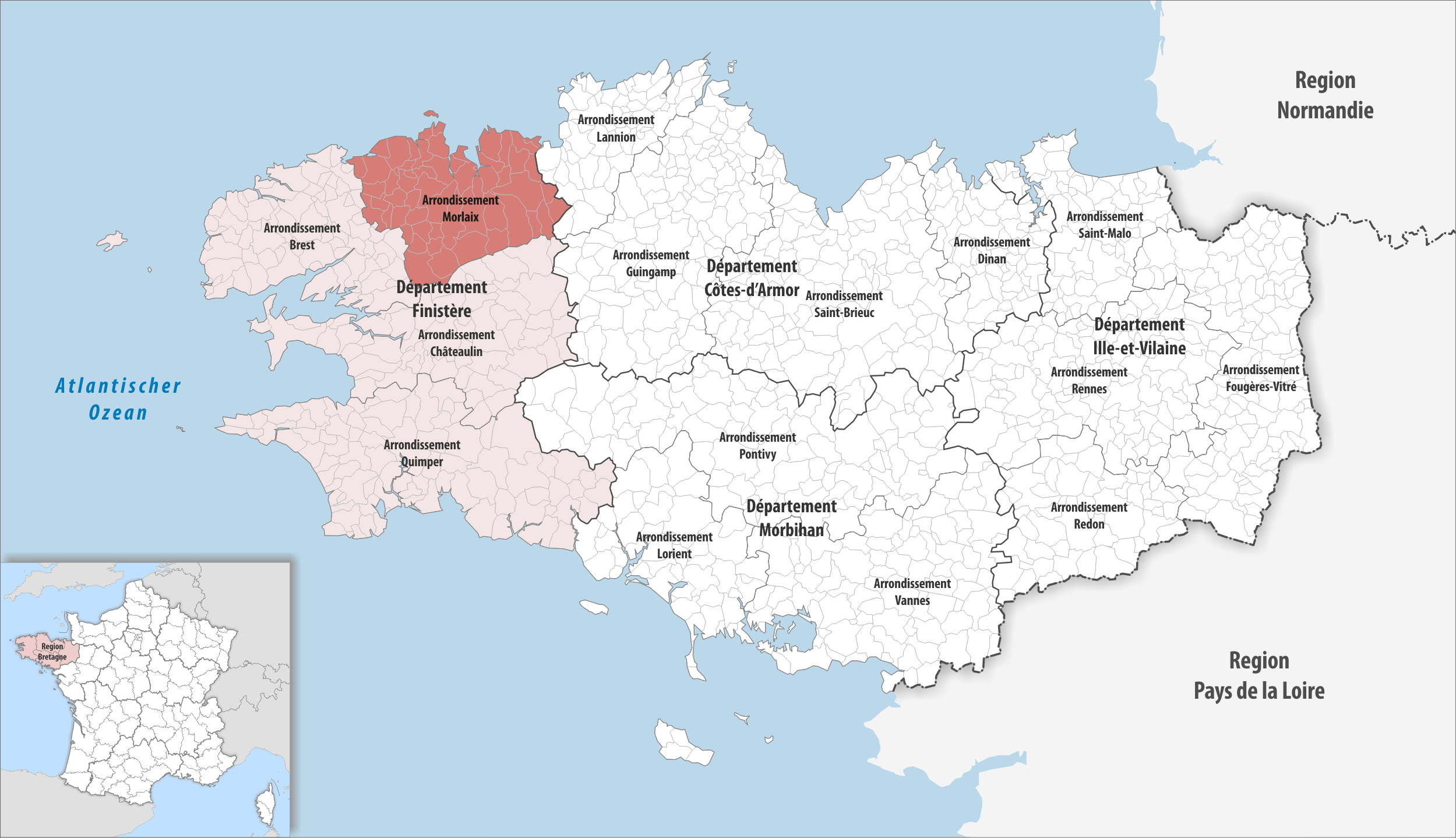
- Location within the region Brittany
- Country: France
- Region: Brittany
- Department: Finistère
- No. of communes: {{{nbcomm}}}
- Area: 1,330.6 km^{2} (513.7 sq mi)
- Population (2023): 131,642
  - Density: 98.934/km^{2} (256.24/sq mi)
- INSEE code: 293

The arrondissement of Morlaix is an arrondissement of France in the Finistère department in the Brittany region. It has 59 communes. Its population is 129,938 (2021), and its area is 1,330.6 km^{2} (513.7 sq mi).

== Composition ==
The communes of the arrondissement of Morlaix, and their INSEE codes, are:

1. Bodilis (29010)
2. Botsorhel (29014)
3. Carantec (29023)
4. Cléder (29030)
5. Le Cloître-Saint-Thégonnec (29034)
6. Commana (29038)
7. Garlan (29059)
8. Guerlesquin (29067)
9. Guiclan (29068)
10. Guimaëc (29073)
11. Guimiliau (29074)
12. Henvic (29079)
13. Île-de-Batz (29082)
14. Lampaul-Guimiliau (29097)
15. Landivisiau (29105)
16. Lanhouarneau (29111)
17. Lanmeur (29113)
18. Lannéanou (29114)
19. Loc-Eguiner (29128)
20. Locmélar (29131)
21. Locquirec (29133)
22. Locquénolé (29132)
23. Mespaul (29148)
24. Morlaix (29151)
25. Pleyber-Christ (29163)
26. Plouégat-Guérand (29182)
27. Plouégat-Moysan (29183)
28. Plouénan (29184)
29. Plouescat (29185)
30. Plouezoc'h (29186)
31. Plougar (29187)
32. Plougasnou (29188)
33. Plougonven (29191)
34. Plougoulm (29192)
35. Plougourvest (29193)
36. Plouigneau (29199)
37. Plounéour-Ménez (29202)
38. Plounéventer (29204)
39. Plounévez-Lochrist (29206)
40. Plourin-lès-Morlaix (29207)
41. Plouvorn (29210)
42. Plouzévédé (29213)
43. Roscoff (29239)
44. Saint-Derrien (29244)
45. Saint-Jean-du-Doigt (29251)
46. Saint-Martin-des-Champs (29254)
47. Saint-Pol-de-Léon (29259)
48. Saint-Sauveur (29262)
49. Saint-Servais (29264)
50. Saint-Thégonnec Loc-Eguiner (29266)
51. Saint-Vougay (29271)
52. Sainte-Sève (29265)
53. Santec (29273)
54. Sibiril (29276)
55. Sizun (29277)
56. Taulé (29279)
57. Tréflaouénan (29285)
58. Tréflez (29287)
59. Trézilidé (29301)

== History ==
The arrondissement of Morlaix was created in 1800. At the January 2017 reorganisation of the arrondissements of Finistère, it gained one commune from the arrondissement of Brest.

As a result of the reorganisation of the cantons of France which came into effect in 2015, the borders of the cantons are no longer related to the borders of the arrondissements. The cantons of the arrondissement of Morlaix were, as of January 2015:

1. Landivisiau
2. Lanmeur
3. Morlaix
4. Plouescat
5. Plouigneau
6. Plouzévédé
7. Saint-Pol-de-Léon
8. Saint-Thégonnec
9. Sizun
10. Taulé
