= Garlan =

Garlan Garlann
- Commune
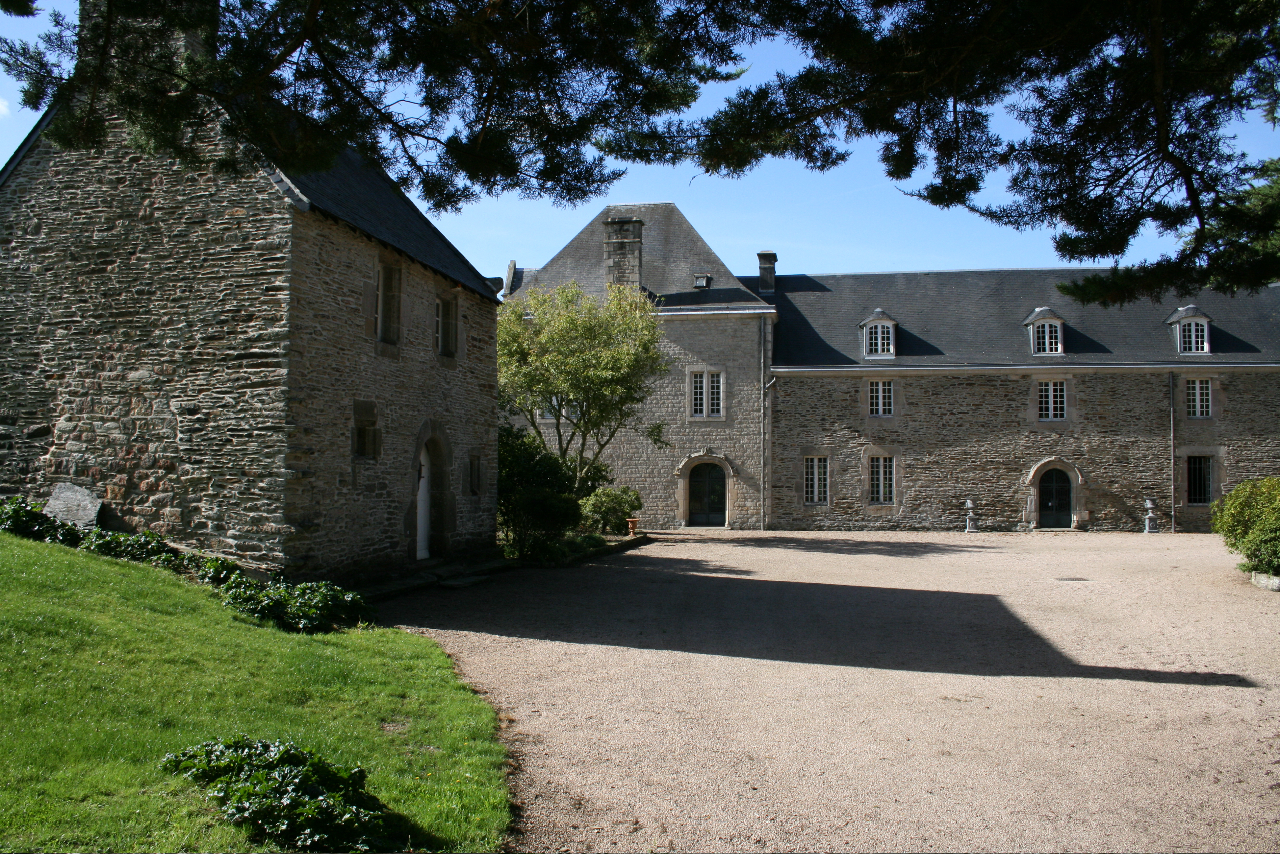
- The Château du Bois de la Roche, in Garlan
- Location of Garlan
- Location within France Location within Brittany
- Coordinates: 48°36′07″N 3°45′21″W
- Country: France
- Region: Brittany
- Department: Finistère
- Arrondissement: Morlaix
- Canton: Plouigneau
- Intercommunality: Morlaix Communauté

Government
  - Mayor (2020–2026): Joseph Irrien
- Area^{1}: 13.34 km^{2} (5.15 sq mi)
- Highest elevation: 119 m (390 ft)
- Lowest elevation: 18 m (59 ft)
- Population (2023): 1,043
  - Density: 78.19/km^{2} (202.5/sq mi)
- Time zone: UTC+01:00 (CET)
  - Summer (DST): UTC+02:00 (CEST)
- INSEE/Postal code: 29059 /29610
- ^{1} French Land Register data, which excludes lakes, ponds, glaciers > 1 km^{2} (0.386 sq mi or 247 acres) and river estuaries.

Garlan (French pronunciation: [ɡaʁlɑ̃]; Breton: Garlann) is a commune in the Finistère department of Brittany in north-western France.

== Population ==
Inhabitants of Garlan are called in French Garlannais.

== See also ==
- Communes of the Finistère department
