= Lannéanou =

Lannéanou Lanneanoù
- Commune
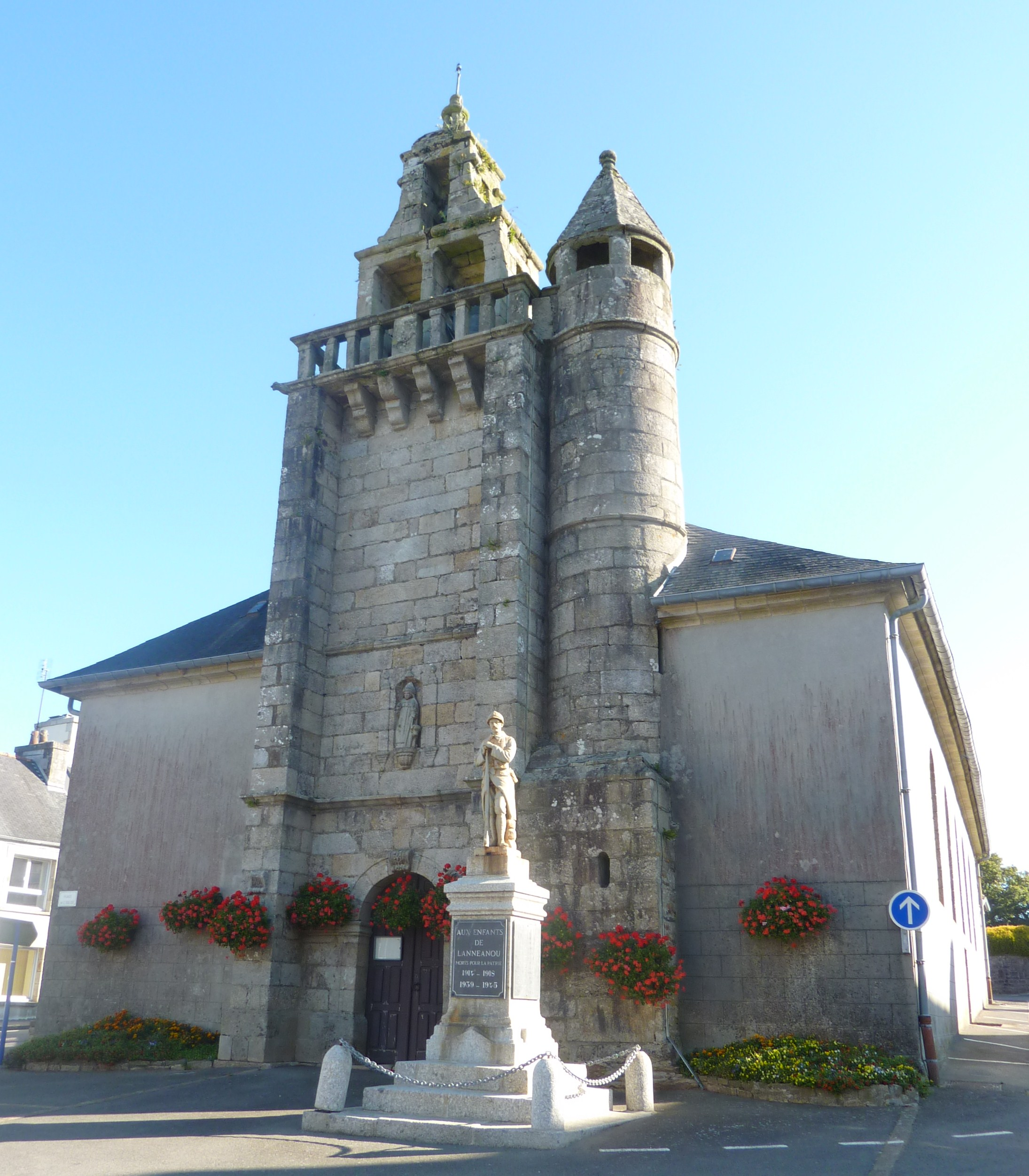
- The parish church of Saint-Jean-Baptiste, in Lannéanou
- Location of Lannéanou
- Location within France Location within Brittany
- Coordinates: 48°29′22″N 3°40′17″W
- Country: France
- Region: Brittany
- Department: Finistère
- Arrondissement: Morlaix
- Canton: Plouigneau
- Intercommunality: Morlaix Communauté

Government
  - Mayor (2021–2026): Hervé Saint Jalm
- Area^{1}: 16.17 km^{2} (6.24 sq mi)
- Highest elevation: 285 m (935 ft)
- Lowest elevation: 119 m (390 ft)
- Population (2023): 342
  - Density: 21.2/km^{2} (54.8/sq mi)
- Time zone: UTC+01:00 (CET)
  - Summer (DST): UTC+02:00 (CEST)
- INSEE/Postal code: 29114 /29640
- ^{1} French Land Register data, which excludes lakes, ponds, glaciers > 1 km^{2} (0.386 sq mi or 247 acres) and river estuaries.

Lannéanou (French pronunciation: [laneanu]; Breton: Lanneanoù) is a commune in the Finistère department of Brittany in north-western France.

== Population ==
Historical population
Year	Pop.	±% p.a.
1968	499	—
1975	427	−2.20%
1982	356	−2.56%
1990	357	+0.04%
1999	341	−0.51%
2007	361	+0.71%
2012	366	+0.28%
2017	378	+0.65%
2023	342	−1.65%
Source: INSEE

Inhabitants of Lannéanou are called in French Lannécois.

== See also ==
- Communes of the Finistère department
