= Plougar =

Plougar Gwikar
- Commune
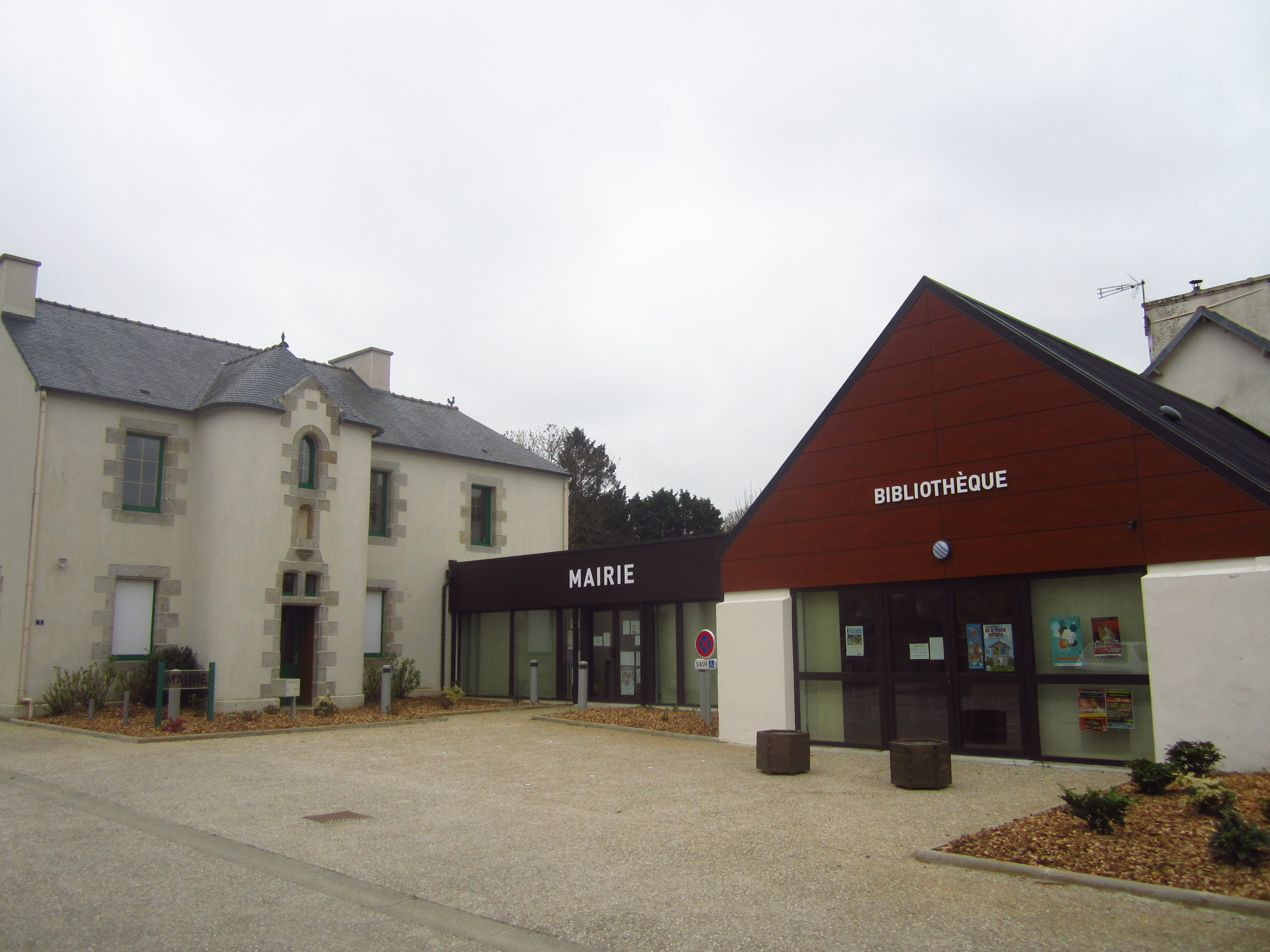
- The town hall in Plougar
- Location of Plougar
- Location within France Location within Brittany
- Coordinates: 48°33′50″N 4°08′24″W
- Country: France
- Region: Brittany
- Department: Finistère
- Arrondissement: Morlaix
- Canton: Landivisiau
- Intercommunality: Pays de Landivisiau

Government
  - Mayor (2020–2026): Laurent Le Borgne
- Area^{1}: 17.48 km^{2} (6.75 sq mi)
- Highest elevation: 118 m (387 ft)
- Lowest elevation: 53 m (174 ft)
- Population (2023): 789
  - Density: 45.1/km^{2} (117/sq mi)
- Time zone: UTC+01:00 (CET)
  - Summer (DST): UTC+02:00 (CEST)
- INSEE/Postal code: 29187 /29440
- ^{1} French Land Register data, which excludes lakes, ponds, glaciers > 1 km^{2} (0.386 sq mi or 247 acres) and river estuaries.

Plougar (French pronunciation: [pluɡaʁ]; Breton: Gwikar) is a commune in the Finistère department of Brittany in north-western France.

== Population ==
Inhabitants of Plougar are called in French Plougarois.

== See also ==
- Communes of the Finistère department
- Yann Larhantec
