= Botsorhel =

Botsorhel Bodsorc'hel
- Commune
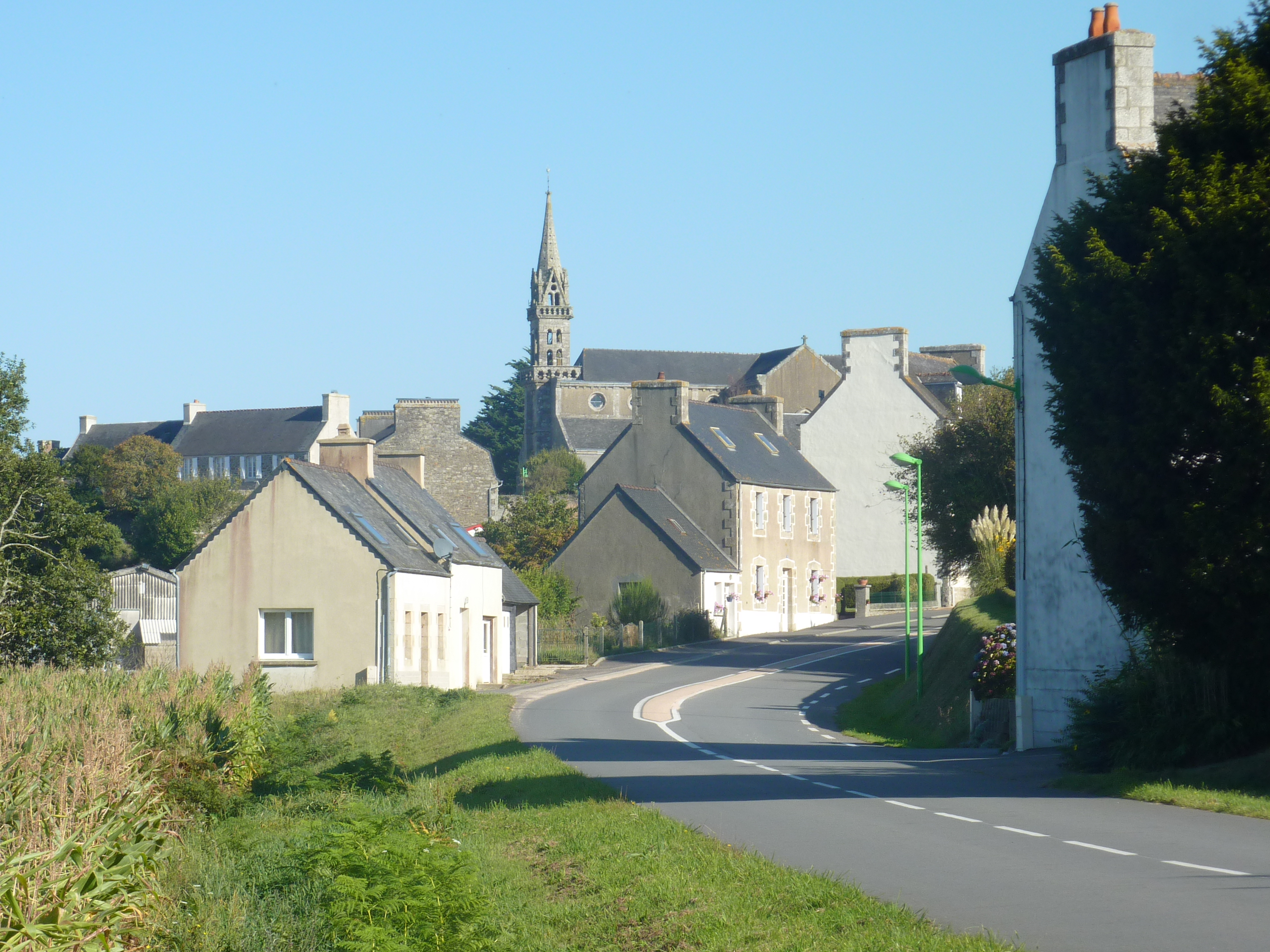
- Botsorhel seen from the south
- Location of Botsorhel
- Location within France Location within Brittany
- Coordinates: 48°31′40″N 3°38′24″W
- Country: France
- Region: Brittany
- Department: Finistère
- Arrondissement: Morlaix
- Canton: Plouigneau
- Intercommunality: Morlaix Communauté

Government
  - Mayor (2020–2026): Hervé Cillard
- Area^{1}: 25.64 km^{2} (9.90 sq mi)
- Highest elevation: 265 m (869 ft)
- Lowest elevation: 92 m (302 ft)
- Population (2023): 425
  - Density: 16.6/km^{2} (42.9/sq mi)
- Time zone: UTC+01:00 (CET)
  - Summer (DST): UTC+02:00 (CEST)
- INSEE/Postal code: 29014 /29650
- ^{1} French Land Register data, which excludes lakes, ponds, glaciers > 1 km^{2} (0.386 sq mi or 247 acres) and river estuaries.

Botsorhel (French pronunciation: [bɔtsɔʁεl]; Breton: Bodsorc'hel) is a commune in the Finistère department of Brittany in north-western France.

== Population ==
Historical population
Year	Pop.	±% p.a.
1968	674	—
1975	608	−1.46%
1982	563	−1.09%
1990	568	+0.11%
1999	493	−1.56%
2007	476	−0.44%
2012	459	−0.72%
2017	428	−1.39%
2023	425	−0.12%
Source: INSEE

Inhabitants of Botsorhel are called Botsorhélois in French.

== See also ==
- Communes of the Finistère department
- Parc naturel régional d'Armorique
