= Locquirec =

Locquirec Lokireg
- Commune
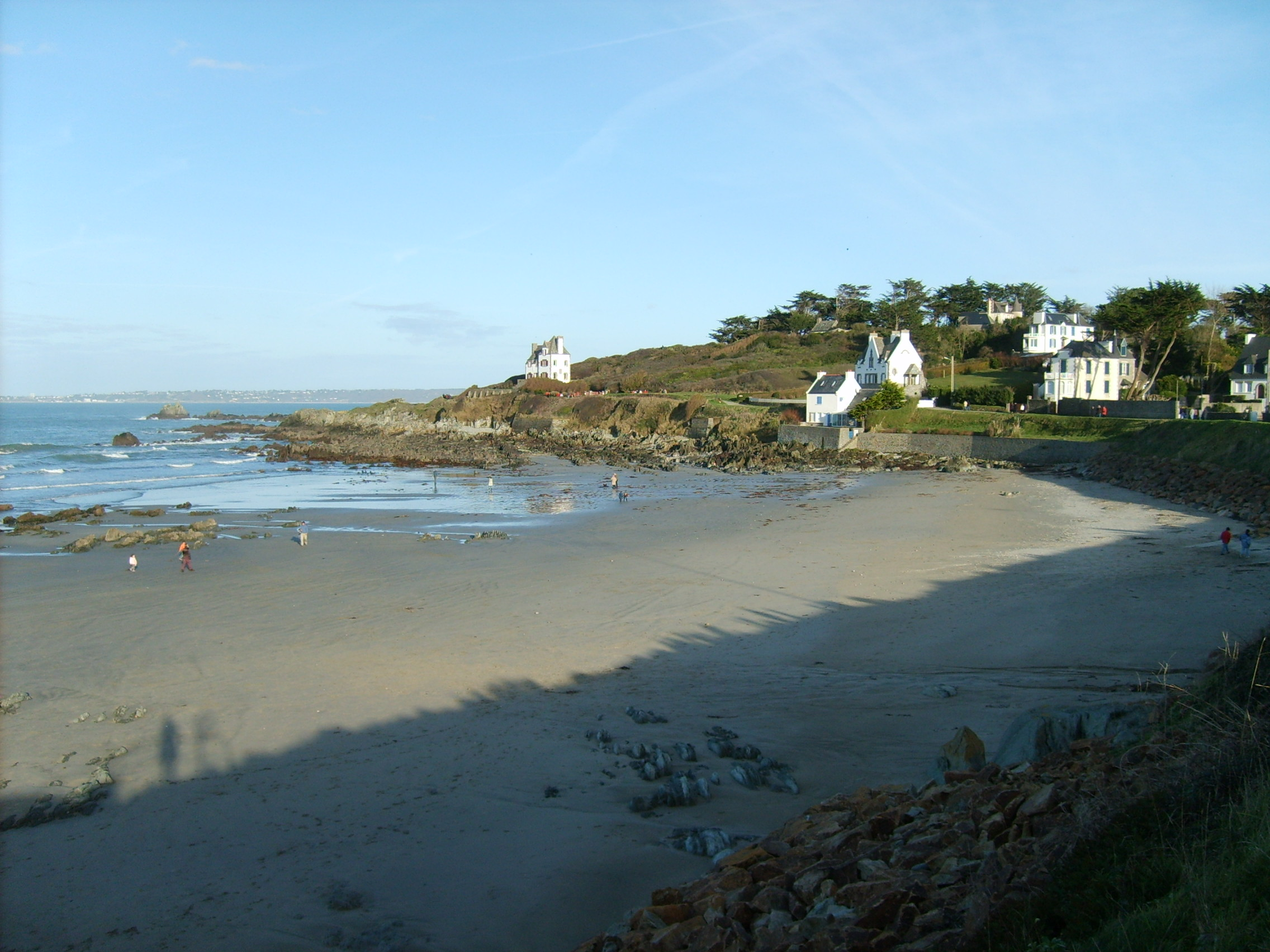
- The beach at Locquirec

- Coat of arms
- Location of Locquirec
- Location within France Location within Brittany
- Coordinates: 48°41′35″N 3°38′37″W
- Country: France
- Region: Brittany
- Department: Finistère
- Arrondissement: Morlaix
- Canton: Plouigneau
- Intercommunality: Morlaix Communauté

Government
  - Mayor (2020–2026): Gwénolé Guyomarc'h
- Area^{1}: 5.96 km^{2} (2.30 sq mi)
- Highest elevation: 78 m (256 ft)
- Lowest elevation: 0 m (0 ft)
- Population (2023): 1,555
  - Density: 261/km^{2} (676/sq mi)
- Time zone: UTC+01:00 (CET)
  - Summer (DST): UTC+02:00 (CEST)
- INSEE/Postal code: 29133 /29241
- ^{1} French Land Register data, which excludes lakes, ponds, glaciers > 1 km^{2} (0.386 sq mi or 247 acres) and river estuaries.

Locquirec (French pronunciation: [lɔkiʁɛk]; Breton: Lokireg) is a commune in the Finistère department of Brittany in north-western France.

== Geography ==
The town is built around the church and the marina. The town of Locquirec is home to several beaches: Port beach, in the centre of the town, Pors Ar Villec, the White Sands, the Moulin de la Rive, and the Fond de la Baie beach. Whatever the direction of the wind, there is sure to be a sheltered beach. Port beach is very popular owing to its facing south-east, which is rare in northern Brittany. The town also has fairly high cliffs, up to fifty metres, forming headlands (Pointe du Château, Pointe du Corbeau, and Pointe northeast of Moulin de la Rive).

The bay of Locquirec is formed by the mouth of the coastal river Douron, which separates the two departments of Finistère and Côtes d'Armor, Locquirec being on its left bank and Plestin-les-Grèves on its right bank.

== Toponymy ==
The name derives from the Breton lok, which means hermitage (cf. Locminé), and Guirec, a Breton saint.

== Population ==
Inhabitants of Locquirec are called in French Locquirécois.

== International relations ==
Locquirec is twinned with:

- (Republic of Ireland) Drumshanbo, County Leitrim, Ireland

== Personalities ==
- Academician Michel Mohrt (1914-2011), born in Morlaix, owned a holiday home here where he stayed regularly
- François Seité (1923-1944), born in Locquirec, officer of the Free French Forces, Companion of the Liberation
- Léon Fleuriot, historian and linguist, specialist in Celtic languages (1923-1987), born in Morlaix and owned a holiday home here, is buried here
- Historian Jean-Christophe Cassard (1951-2013) is buried here. Born in La Rochelle, originally from the Locquirec region by his mother, he lived here.
- The musician Pierre Sangra, born in 1959 in Fontenay-sous-Bois, owns a family home here where he regularly resides
- The singer-songwriter Thomas Fersen, born in Paris in 1963, lives here.
- The singer and musician Jean-Pierre Riou, born in Morlaix in 1963, leader of the group Red Cardell, lives here.

== See also ==
- Communes of the Finistère department
