= Le Cloître-Saint-Thégonnec =

Le Cloître-Saint-Thégonnec Ar C'hloastr-Plourin
- Commune
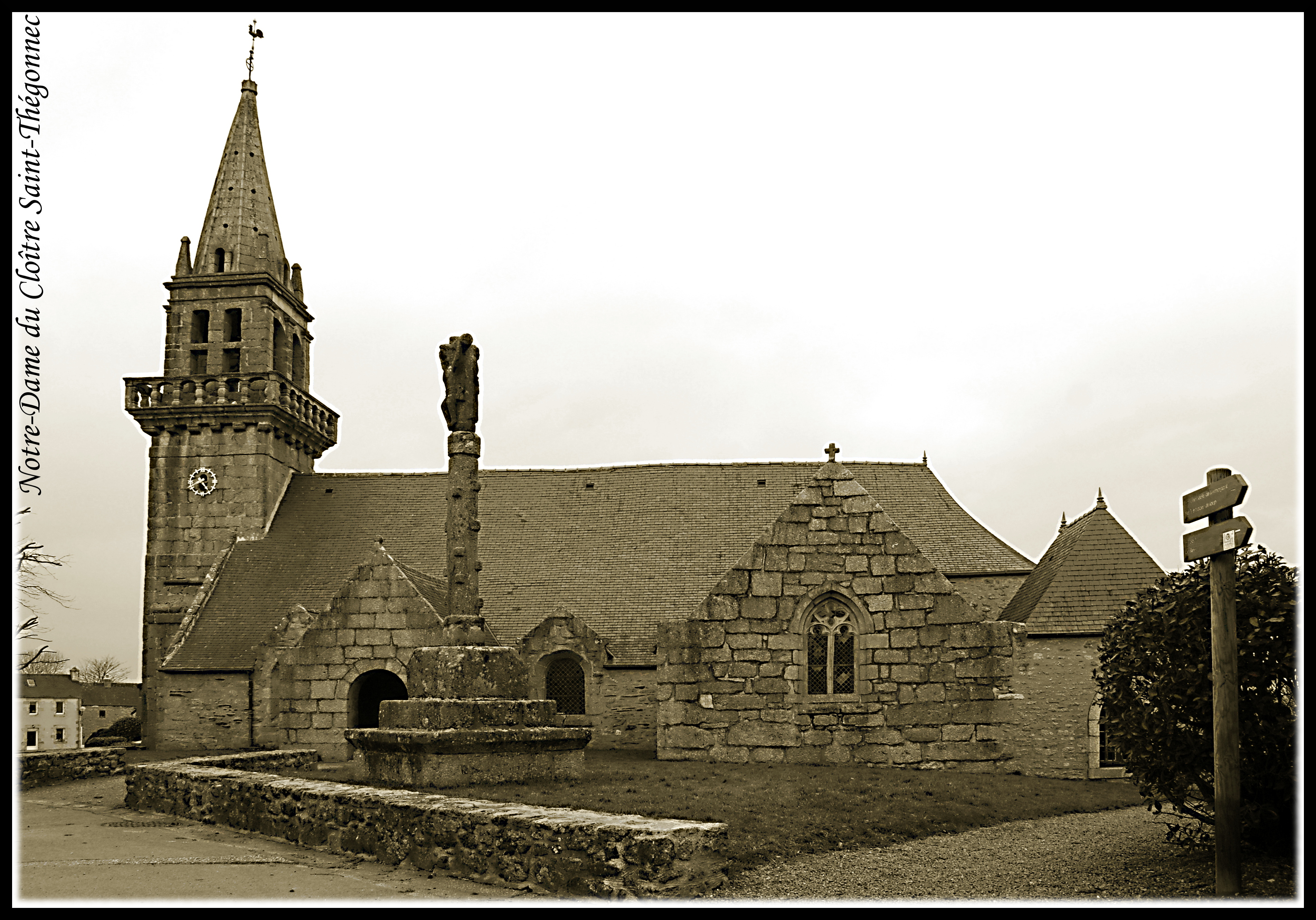
- Notre-Dame of the Cloître Saint-Thégonnec
- Location of Le Cloître-Saint-Thégonnec
- Location within France Location within Brittany
- Coordinates: 48°28′51″N 3°47′36″W
- Country: France
- Region: Brittany
- Department: Finistère
- Arrondissement: Morlaix
- Canton: Plouigneau
- Intercommunality: Morlaix Communauté

Government
  - Mayor (2020–2026): Jean-René Péron
- Area^{1}: 28.48 km^{2} (11.00 sq mi)
- Highest elevation: 300 m (980 ft)
- Lowest elevation: 100 m (330 ft)
- Population (2023): 641
  - Density: 22.5/km^{2} (58.3/sq mi)
- Time zone: UTC+01:00 (CET)
  - Summer (DST): UTC+02:00 (CEST)
- INSEE/Postal code: 29034 /29410
- ^{1} French Land Register data, which excludes lakes, ponds, glaciers > 1 km^{2} (0.386 sq mi or 247 acres) and river estuaries.

Le Cloître-Saint-Thégonnec (French pronunciation: [lə klwatʁ sɛ̃ teɡɔnɛk]; Breton: Ar C'hloastr-Plourin) is a commune in the Finistère department of Brittany in north-western France.

== Population ==
Historical population
Year	Pop.	±% p.a.
1968	566	—
1975	518	−1.26%
1982	561	+1.15%
1990	566	+0.11%
1999	569	+0.06%
2007	595	+0.56%
2012	669	+2.37%
2017	660	−0.27%
2023	641	−0.49%
Source: INSEE

Inhabitants of Le Cloître-Saint-Thégonnec are called in French Cloîtriens.

== See also ==
- Communes of the Finistère department
