= Plouégat-Moysan =

Plouégat-Moysan Plegad-Moezan
- Commune
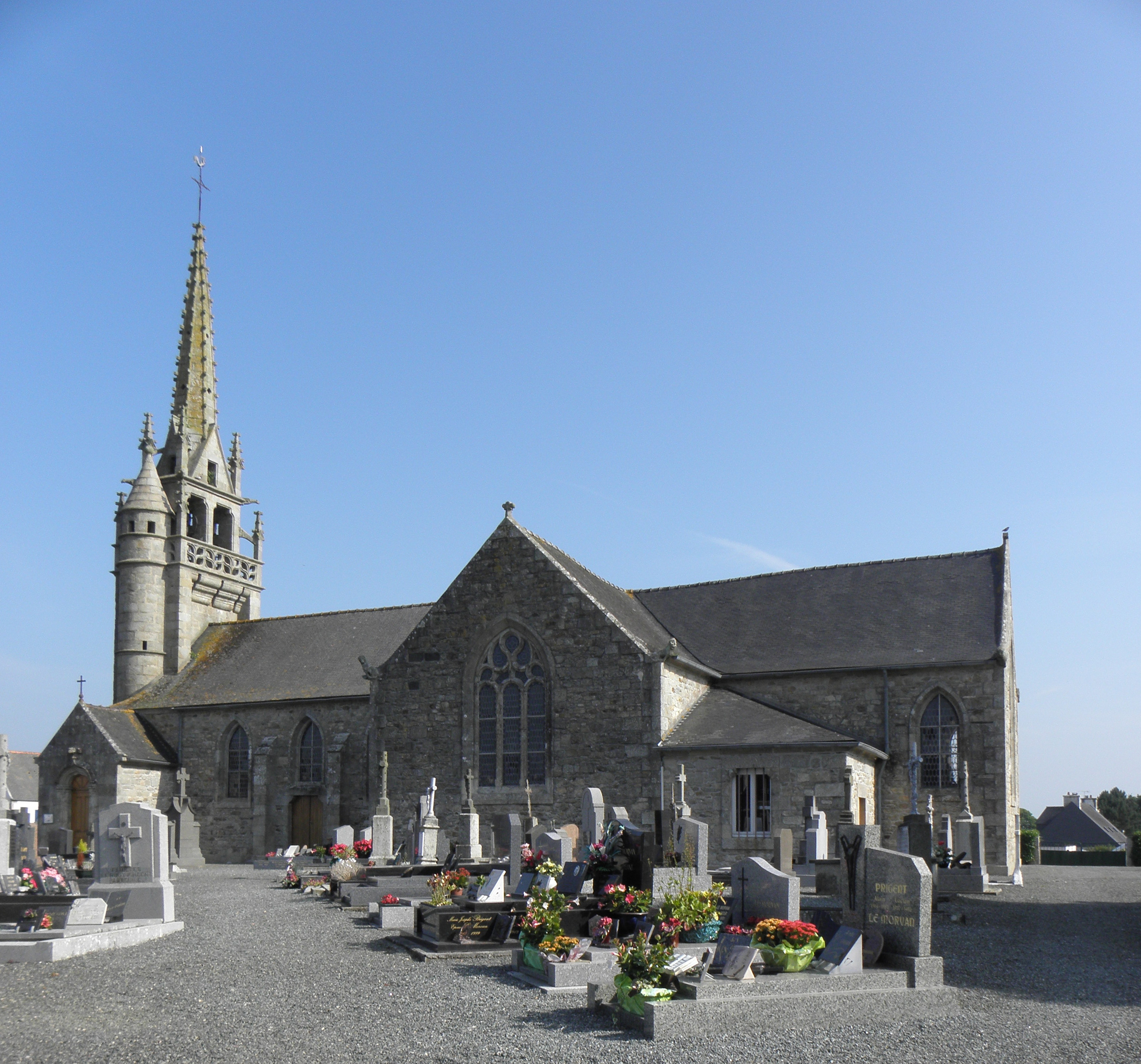
- The parish church of Saint-Pierre, in Plouégat-Moysan
- Location of Plouégat-Moysan
- Location within France Location within Brittany
- Coordinates: 48°34′21″N 3°36′33″W
- Country: France
- Region: Brittany
- Department: Finistère
- Arrondissement: Morlaix
- Canton: Plouigneau
- Intercommunality: Morlaix Communauté

Government
  - Mayor (2020–2026): François Girotto
- Area^{1}: 14.97 km^{2} (5.78 sq mi)
- Highest elevation: 256 m (840 ft)
- Lowest elevation: 58 m (190 ft)
- Population (2023): 717
  - Density: 47.9/km^{2} (124/sq mi)
- Time zone: UTC+01:00 (CET)
  - Summer (DST): UTC+02:00 (CEST)
- INSEE/Postal code: 29183 /29650
- ^{1} French Land Register data, which excludes lakes, ponds, glaciers > 1 km^{2} (0.386 sq mi or 247 acres) and river estuaries.

Plouégat-Moysan (French pronunciation: [plueɡat mwazɑ̃]; Breton: Plegad-Moezan) is a commune in the Finistère department of Brittany in north-western France.

== Population ==
Inhabitants of Plouégat-Moysan are called in French Plouégatais.

== See also ==
- Communes of the Finistère department
