= Plougoulm =

Plougoulm Plougouloum
- Commune
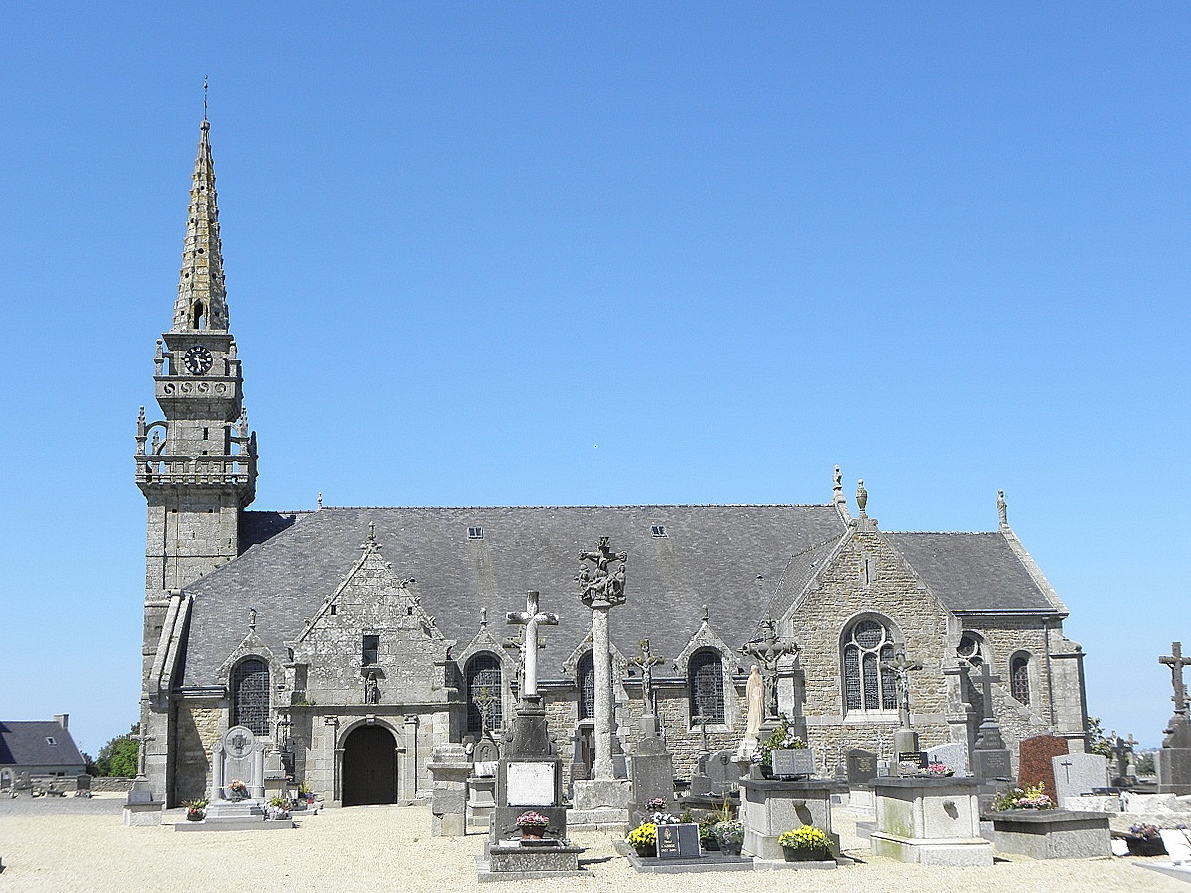
- The parish church of Saint-Colomban

- Coat of arms
- Location of Plougoulm
- Location within France Location within Brittany
- Coordinates: 48°39′55″N 4°02′37″W
- Country: France
- Region: Brittany
- Department: Finistère
- Arrondissement: Morlaix
- Canton: Saint-Pol-de-Léon

Government
  - Mayor (2020–2026): Patrick Guen
- Area^{1}: 18.37 km^{2} (7.09 sq mi)
- Highest elevation: 61 m (200 ft)
- Lowest elevation: 0 m (0 ft)
- Population (2023): 1,755
  - Density: 95.54/km^{2} (247.4/sq mi)
- Time zone: UTC+01:00 (CET)
  - Summer (DST): UTC+02:00 (CEST)
- INSEE/Postal code: 29192 /29250
- ^{1} French Land Register data, which excludes lakes, ponds, glaciers > 1 km^{2} (0.386 sq mi or 247 acres) and river estuaries.

Plougoulm (French pronunciation: [pluɡulm]; Breton: Plougouloum) is a commune in the Finistère department of Brittany in north-western France.

== Population ==
Inhabitants of Plougoulm are called in French Plougoulmois.

== See also ==
- Communes of the Finistère department
