= Guerlesquin =

Guerlesquin Gwerliskin
- Commune
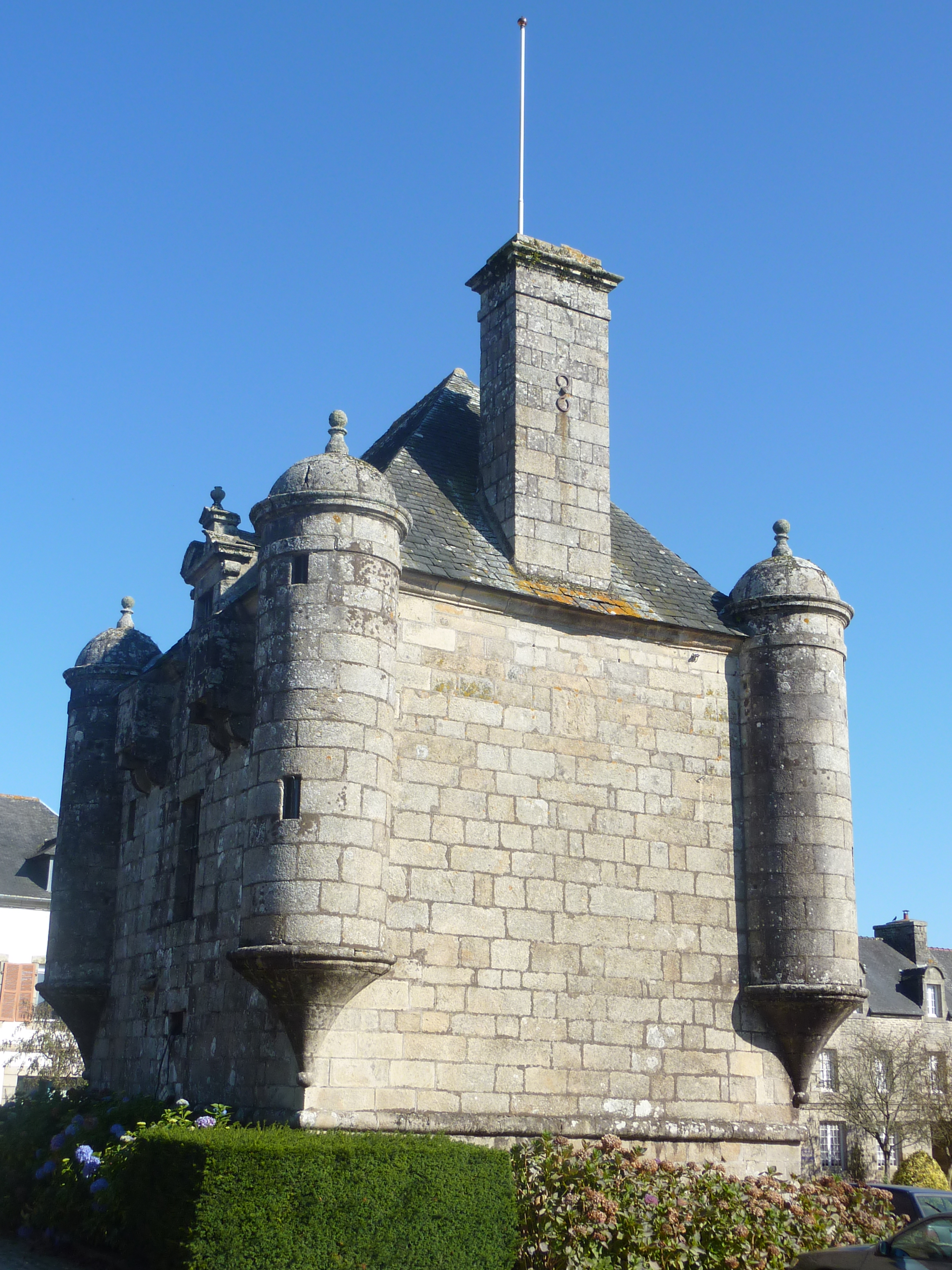
- The presidial of Guerlesquin

- Flag Coat of arms
- Location of Guerlesquin
- Location within France Location within Brittany
- Coordinates: 48°31′06″N 3°35′14″W
- Country: France
- Region: Brittany
- Department: Finistère
- Arrondissement: Morlaix
- Canton: Plouigneau
- Intercommunality: Morlaix Communauté

Government
  - Mayor (2020–2026): Éric Cloarec
- Area^{1}: 21.83 km^{2} (8.43 sq mi)
- Highest elevation: 267 m (876 ft)
- Lowest elevation: 109 m (358 ft)
- Population (2023): 1,285
  - Density: 58.86/km^{2} (152.5/sq mi)
- Time zone: UTC+01:00 (CET)
  - Summer (DST): UTC+02:00 (CEST)
- INSEE/Postal code: 29067 /29650
- ^{1} French Land Register data, which excludes lakes, ponds, glaciers > 1 km^{2} (0.386 sq mi or 247 acres) and river estuaries.

Guerlesquin (French pronunciation: [gɛʁlɛskɛ̃]; Breton: Gwerliskin) is a commune in the Finistère department of Brittany in north-western France.

== Population ==
Inhabitants of Guerlesquin are called in French Guerlesquinais.

Historical population

Year	Pop.	±% p.a.
1793	1,517	—
1800	1,227	−2.99%
1806	1,360	+1.73%
1821	1,397	+0.18%
1831	1,570	+1.17%
1836	1,726	+1.91%
1841	1,714	−0.14%
1846	1,842	+1.45%
1851	1,850	+0.09%
1856	1,758	−1.01%
1861	1,779	+0.24%
1866	1,817	+0.42%
1872	1,875	+0.53%
1876	1,901	+0.34%
1881	1,899	−0.02%
1886	1,898	−0.01%
1891	1,721	−1.94%
1896	1,714	−0.08%
1901	1,744	+0.35%

Year	Pop.	±% p.a.
1906	1,851	+1.20%
1911	1,865	+0.15%
1921	1,620	−1.40%
1926	1,641	+0.26%
1931	1,513	−1.61%
1936	1,433	−1.08%
1946	1,391	−0.30%
1954	1,218	−1.65%
1962	1,159	−0.62%
1968	1,278	+1.64%
1975	1,496	+2.28%
1982	1,831	+2.93%
1990	1,627	−1.47%
1999	1,624	−0.02%
2007	1,413	−1.72%
2012	1,366	−0.67%
2017	1,329	−0.55%
2023	1,285	−0.56%

Source: EHESS and INSEE (1968-2023)

== See also ==
- Communes of the Finistère department
- Parc naturel régional d'Armorique
