= Saint-Thégonnec Loc-Eguiner =

- Commune
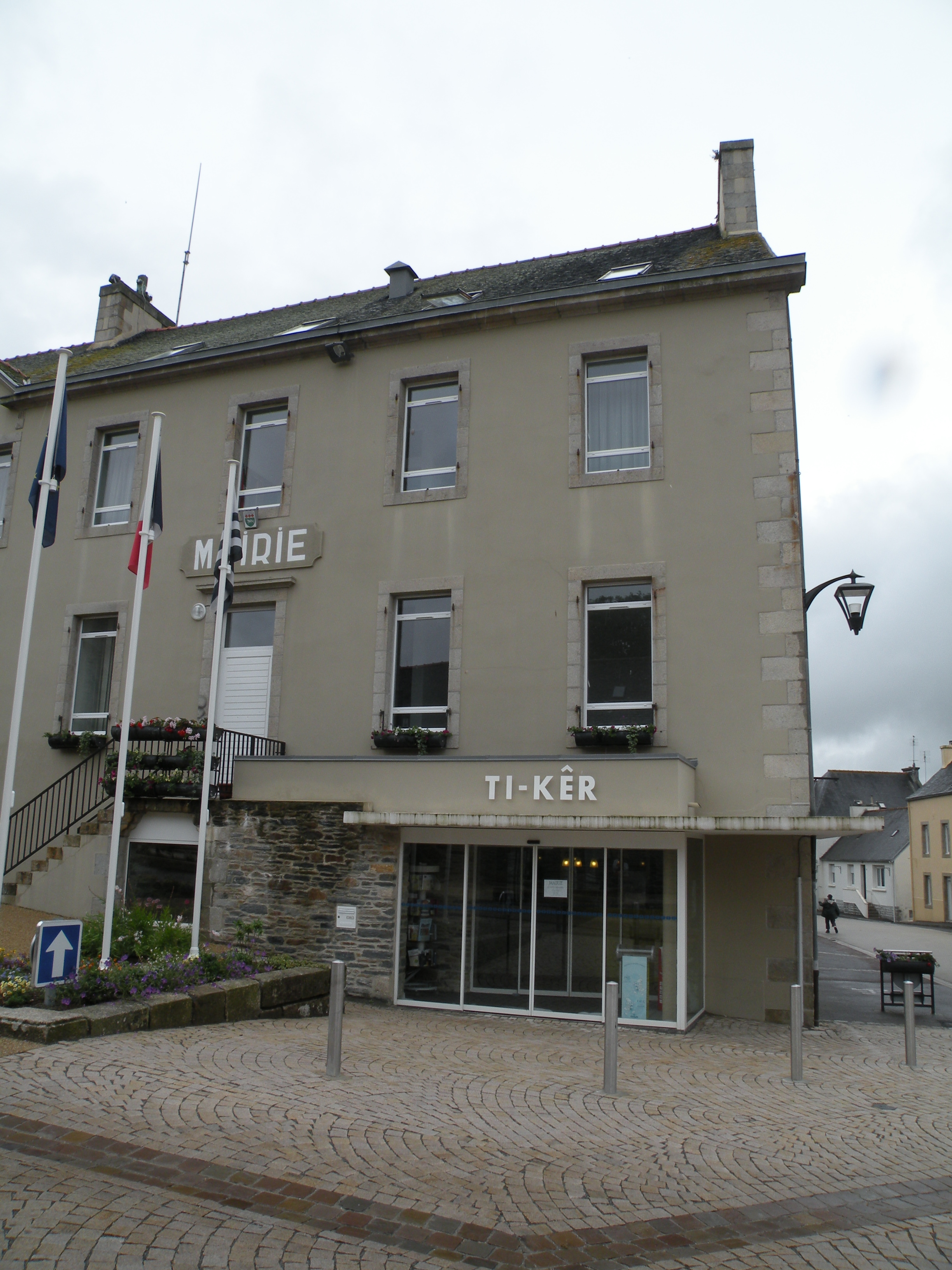
- The town hall in Saint-Thégonnec
- Location of Saint-Thégonnec Loc-Eguiner
- Location within France Location within Brittany
- Coordinates: 48°31′16″N 3°56′49″W
- Country: France
- Region: Brittany
- Department: Finistère
- Arrondissement: Morlaix
- Canton: Morlaix
- Intercommunality: Morlaix Communauté

Government
  - Mayor (2020–2026): Solange Creignou
- Area^{1}: 49.78 km^{2} (19.22 sq mi)
- Population (2023): 3,148
  - Density: 63.24/km^{2} (163.8/sq mi)
- Time zone: UTC+01:00 (CET)
  - Summer (DST): UTC+02:00 (CEST)
- INSEE/Postal code: 29266 /29410
- ^{1} French Land Register data, which excludes lakes, ponds, glaciers > 1 km^{2} (0.386 sq mi or 247 acres) and river estuaries.

Saint-Thégonnec Loc-Eguiner (French pronunciation: [sɛ̃ teɡonɛk lɔk eɡinɛʁ]; Breton: Sant-Tegoneg-Logeginer) is a commune in the Finistère department of western France. The municipality was established on 1 January 2016 and consists of the former communes of Saint-Thégonnec and Loc-Eguiner-Saint-Thégonnec.

== Population ==
Population data refer to the commune in its geography as of January 2025.

Historical population
Year	Pop.	±% p.a.
1968	2,508	—
1975	2,352	−0.91%
1982	2,465	+0.67%
1990	2,458	−0.04%
1999	2,603	+0.64%
2007	2,885	+1.29%
2012	2,949	+0.44%
2017	3,010	+0.41%
2023	3,148	+0.75%
Source: INSEE

== See also ==
- Communes of the Finistère department
