= Canton of Saint-Pol-de-Léon =

Coordinates: 48°41′10″N 4°01′07″W

Saint-Pol-de-Léon
- Canton
- Interactive map of Saint-Pol-de-Léon
- Country: France
- Region: Brittany
- Department: Finistère
- No. of communes: {{{nbcomm}}}
- Area: 246.07 km^{2} (95.01 sq mi)
- Population (2023): 31,851
  - Density: 129.44/km^{2} (335.24/sq mi)
- INSEE code: 29 26

The Canton of Saint-Pol-de-Léon is a French canton, located in the arrondissement of Morlaix, in the Finistère département (Brittany région). Since the French canton reorganisation which came into effect in March 2015, the communes of the canton of Saint-Pol-de-Léon are:

- Cléder
- Île-de-Batz
- Lanhouarneau
- Mespaul
- Plouénan
- Plouescat
- Plougoulm
- Plounévez-Lochrist
- Roscoff
- Saint-Pol-de-Léon (seat)
- Santec
- Sibiril
- Tréflaouénan
- Tréflez

== See also ==
- Cantons of the Finistère department
- List of cantons of France
- Arrondissements of the Finistère department
