= Plounévez-Lochrist =

Plounévez-Lochrist Gwinevez
- Commune
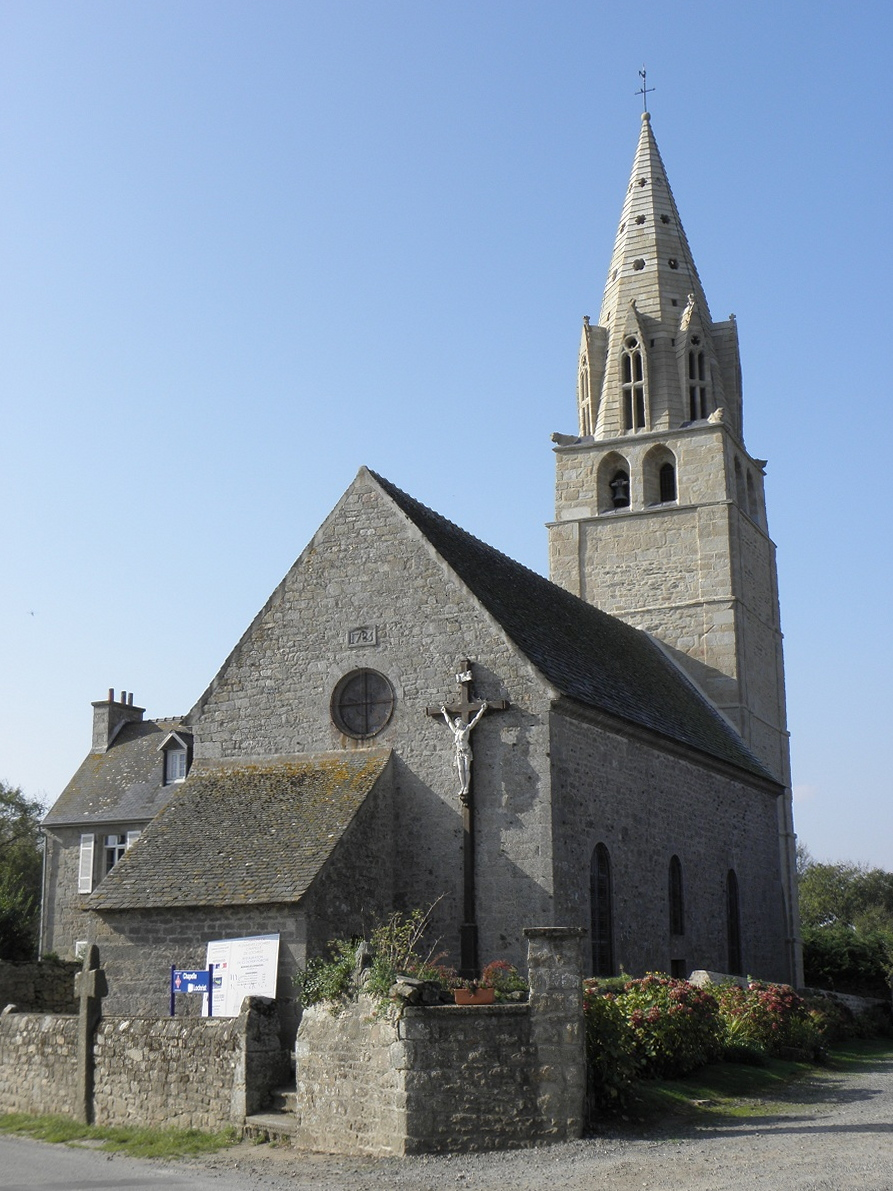
- Church at Plounévez-Lochrist

- Coat of arms
- Location of Plounévez-Lochrist
- Location within France Location within Brittany
- Coordinates: 48°37′03″N 4°12′39″W
- Country: France
- Region: Brittany
- Department: Finistère
- Arrondissement: Morlaix
- Canton: Saint-Pol-de-Léon
- Intercommunality: Haut-Léon Communauté

Government
  - Mayor (2020–2026): Gildas Bernard
- Area^{1}: 39.54 km^{2} (15.27 sq mi)
- Highest elevation: 96 m (315 ft)
- Lowest elevation: 0 m (0 ft)
- Population (2023): 2,281
  - Density: 57.69/km^{2} (149.4/sq mi)
- Time zone: UTC+01:00 (CET)
  - Summer (DST): UTC+02:00 (CEST)
- INSEE/Postal code: 29206 /29430
- ^{1} French Land Register data, which excludes lakes, ponds, glaciers > 1 km^{2} (0.386 sq mi or 247 acres) and river estuaries.

Plounévez-Lochrist (French pronunciation: [pluneve lɔkʁist]; Breton: Gwinevez) is a commune in the Finistère department of Brittany in north-western France.

== Population ==
Inhabitants of Plounévez-Lochrist are called in French Plounévéziens.

Historical population
| Year | Pop. | ±% p.a. |
|---|---|---|
| 1968 | 3,056 | — |
| 1975 | 2,744 | −1.53% |
| 1982 | 2,580 | −0.88% |
| 1990 | 2,356 | −1.13% |
| 1999 | 2,278 | −0.37% |
| 2007 | 2,377 | +0.53% |
| 2012 | 2,391 | +0.12% |
| 2017 | 2,291 | −0.85% |
| 2023 | 2,281 | −0.07% |
Source: INSEE

== See also ==
- Communes of the Finistère department
