= Mespaul =

Mespaul Mespaol
- Commune
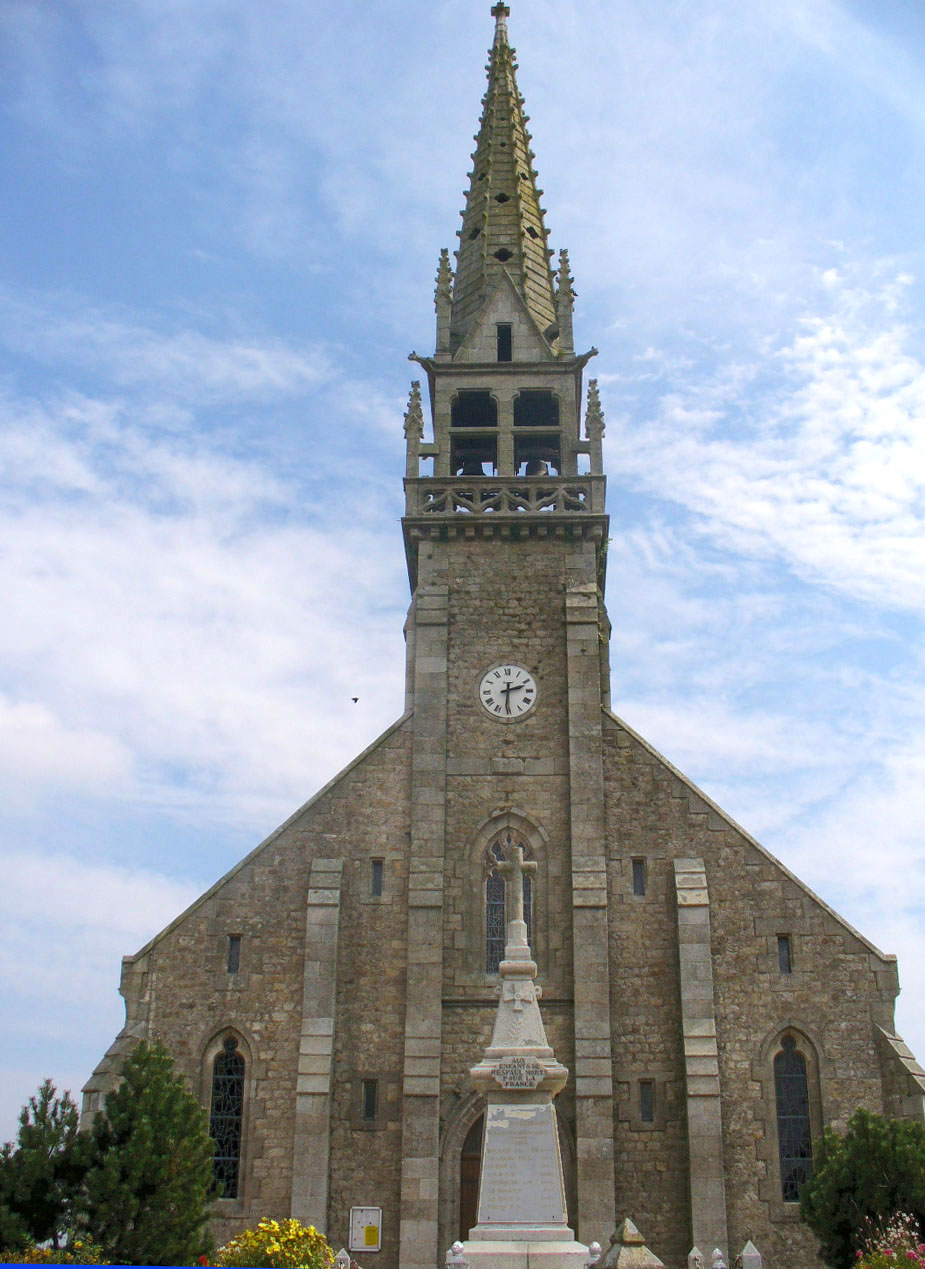
- The church in Mespaul
- Location of Mespaul
- Location within France Location within Brittany
- Coordinates: 48°37′09″N 4°01′25″W
- Country: France
- Region: Brittany
- Department: Finistère
- Arrondissement: Morlaix
- Canton: Saint-Pol-de-Léon

Government
  - Mayor (2020–2026): Bernard Floc'h
- Area^{1}: 11.48 km^{2} (4.43 sq mi)
- Highest elevation: 93 m (305 ft)
- Lowest elevation: 22 m (72 ft)
- Population (2023): 946
  - Density: 82.4/km^{2} (213/sq mi)
- Time zone: UTC+01:00 (CET)
  - Summer (DST): UTC+02:00 (CEST)
- INSEE/Postal code: 29148 /29420
- ^{1} French Land Register data, which excludes lakes, ponds, glaciers > 1 km^{2} (0.386 sq mi or 247 acres) and river estuaries.

Mespaul (French pronunciation: [mɛspɔl]; Breton: Mespaol) is a commune in the Finistère department of Brittany in north-western France.

== Population ==
Historical population
| Year | Pop. | ±% p.a. |
|---|---|---|
| 1968 | 937 | — |
| 1975 | 814 | −1.99% |
| 1982 | 779 | −0.63% |
| 1990 | 797 | +0.29% |
| 1999 | 739 | −0.84% |
| 2007 | 878 | +2.18% |
| 2012 | 912 | +0.76% |
| 2017 | 966 | +1.16% |
| 2023 | 946 | −0.35% |
Source: INSEE

Inhabitants of Mespaul are called in French Mespaulitains.

== See also ==
- Communes of the Finistère department
