= Santec =

Santec Santeg
- Commune
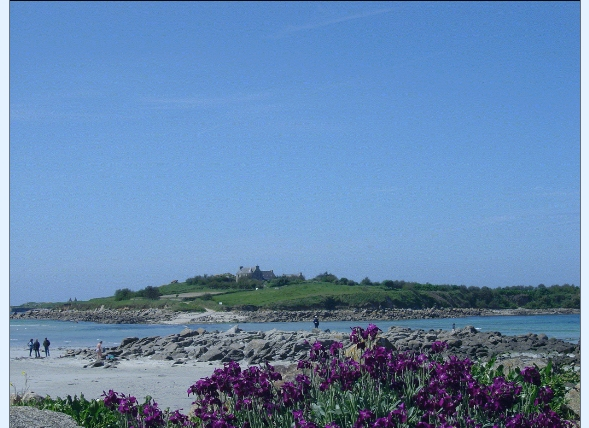
- Île de Sieck seen from Dossen Beach, in Santec

- Coat of arms
- Location of Santec
- Location within France Location within Brittany
- Coordinates: 48°42′16″N 4°01′33″W
- Country: France
- Region: Brittany
- Department: Finistère
- Arrondissement: Morlaix
- Canton: Saint-Pol-de-Léon

Government
  - Mayor (2020–2026): Bernard Le Pors
- Area^{1}: 8.06 km^{2} (3.11 sq mi)
- Highest elevation: 41 m (135 ft)
- Lowest elevation: 0 m (0 ft)
- Population (2023): 2,454
  - Density: 304/km^{2} (789/sq mi)
- Time zone: UTC+01:00 (CET)
  - Summer (DST): UTC+02:00 (CEST)
- INSEE/Postal code: 29273 /29250
- ^{1} French Land Register data, which excludes lakes, ponds, glaciers > 1 km^{2} (0.386 sq mi or 247 acres) and river estuaries.

Santec (French pronunciation: [sɑ̃tɛk]; Breton: Santeg) is a commune in the Finistère department of Brittany in north-western France.

== Population ==
Inhabitants of Santec are called in French Santecois.

Historical population
Year	Pop.	±% p.a.
1968	2,032	—
1975	2,019	−0.09%
1982	2,147	+0.88%
1990	2,208	+0.35%
1999	2,133	−0.38%
2007	2,278	+0.83%
2012	2,328	+0.44%
2017	2,409	+0.69%
2023	2,454	+0.31%
Source: INSEE

== Sights ==
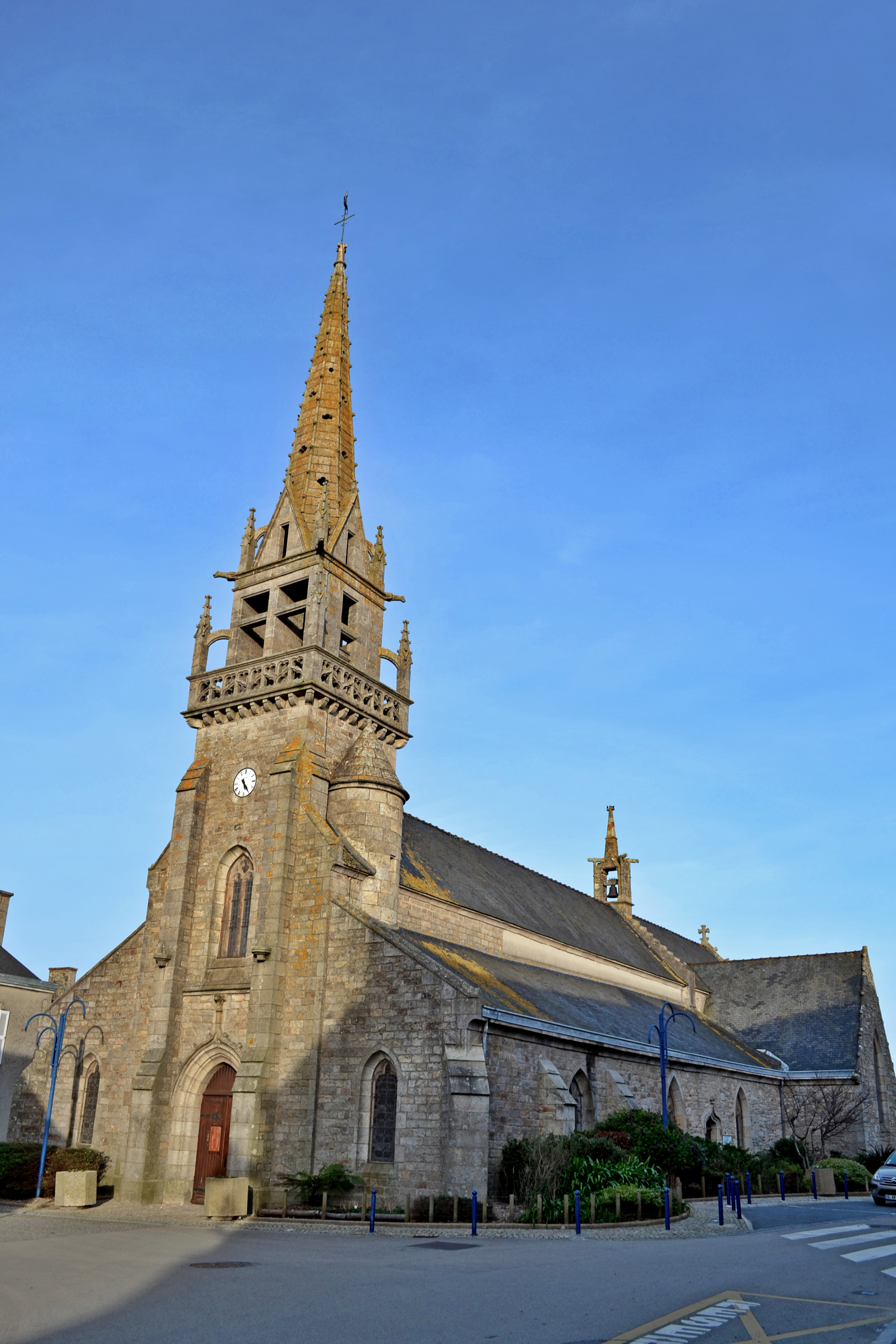
Saint Adrien church

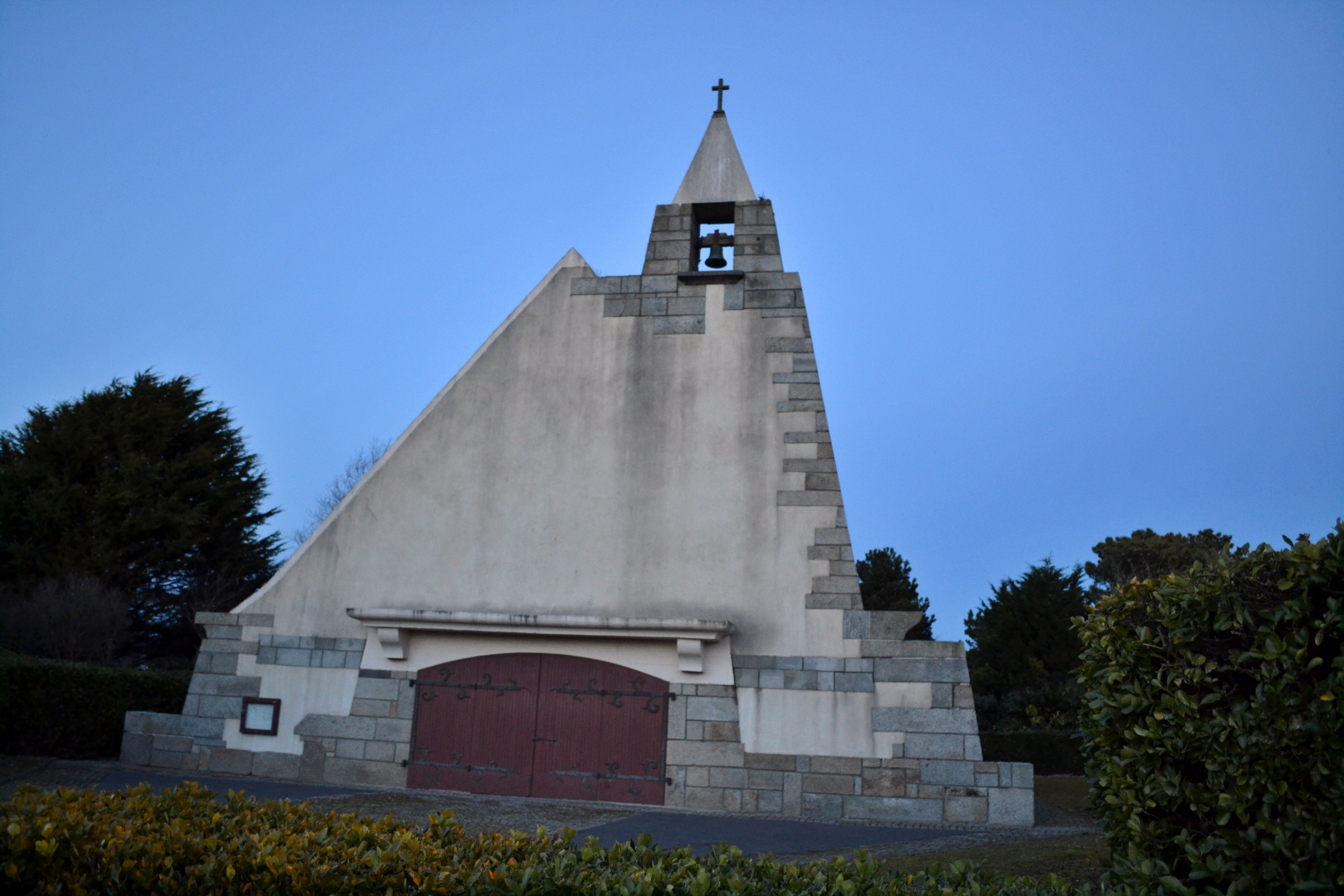
Saint Claude chapel

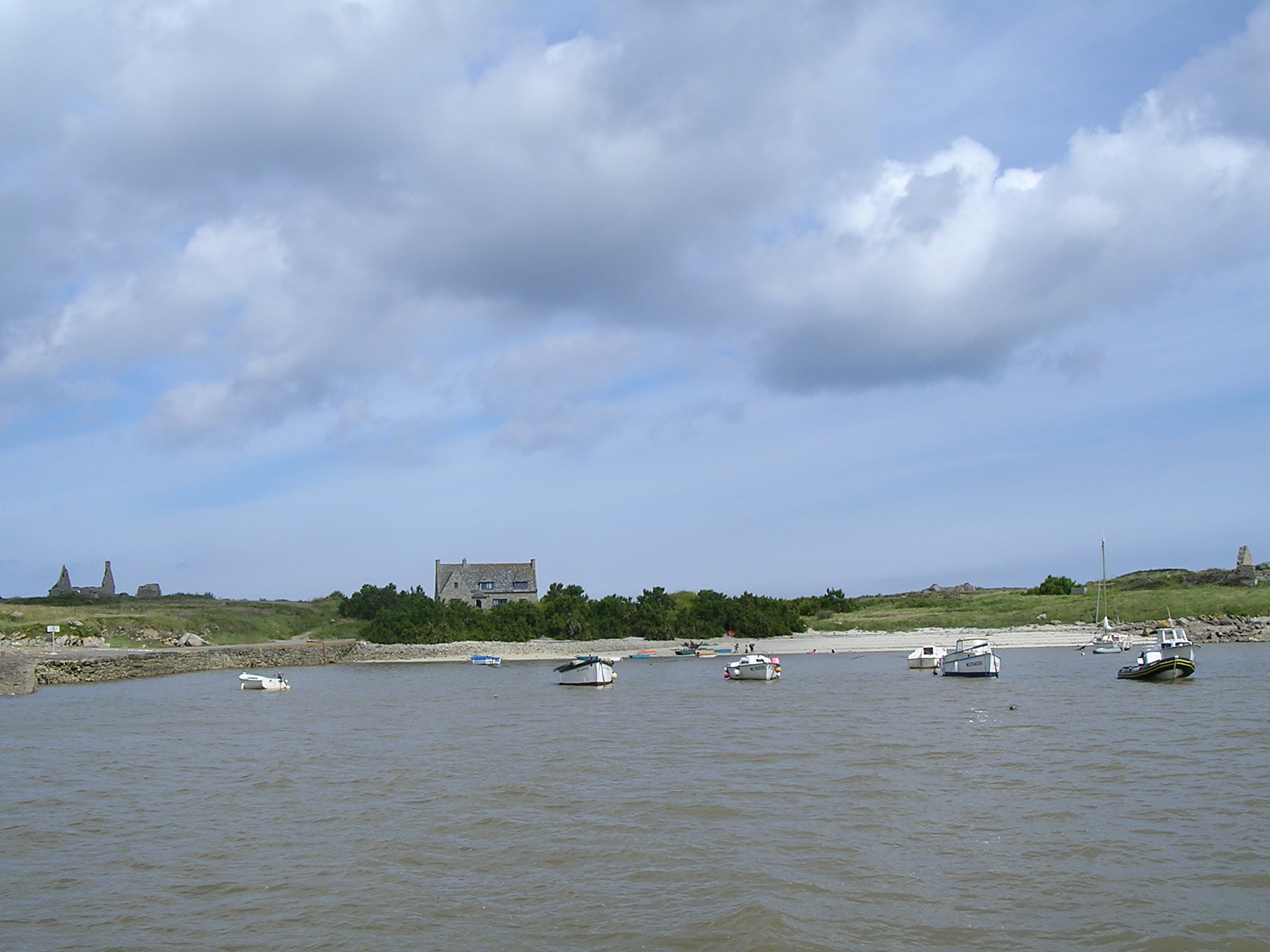
Île de Sieck

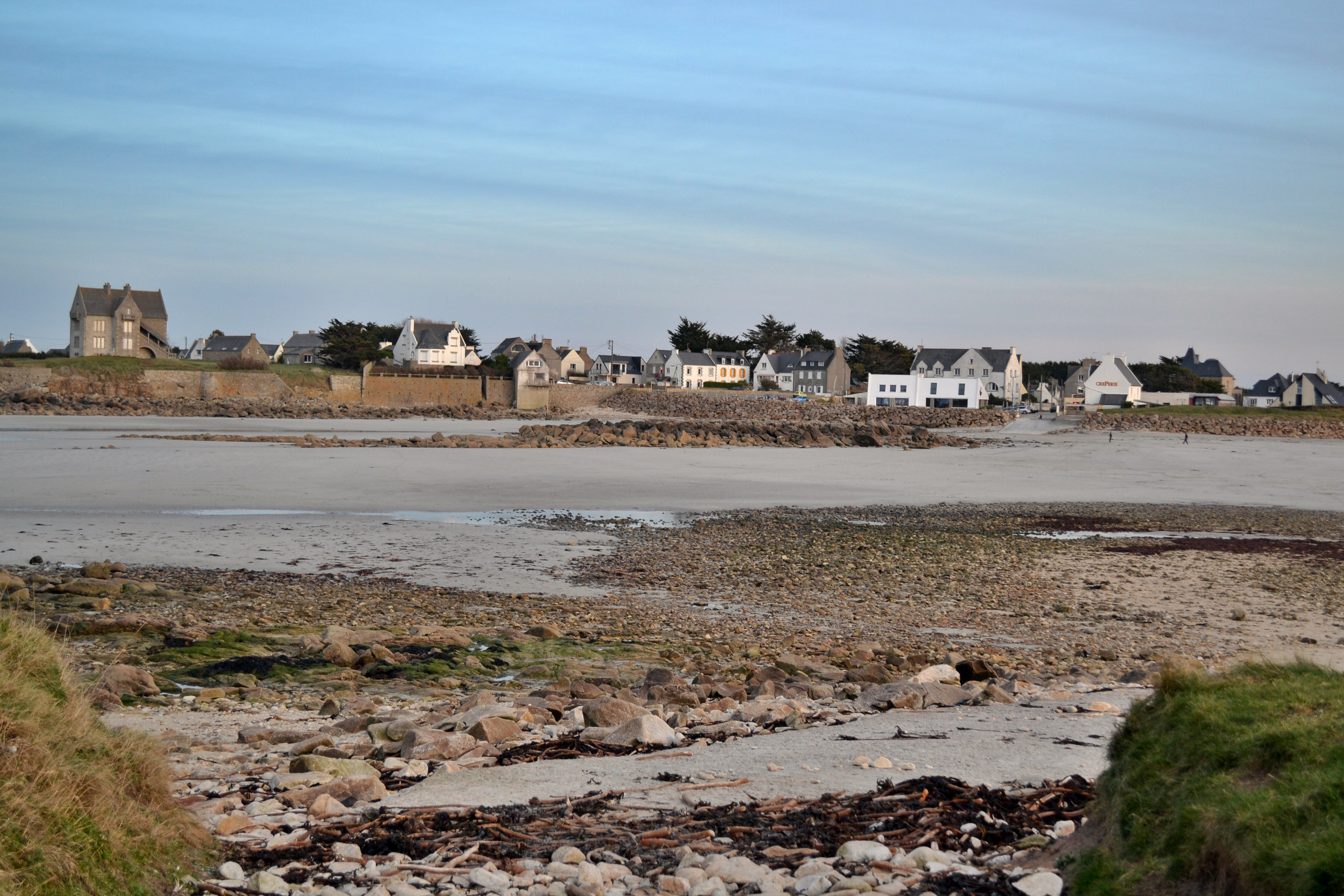
Dossen beach

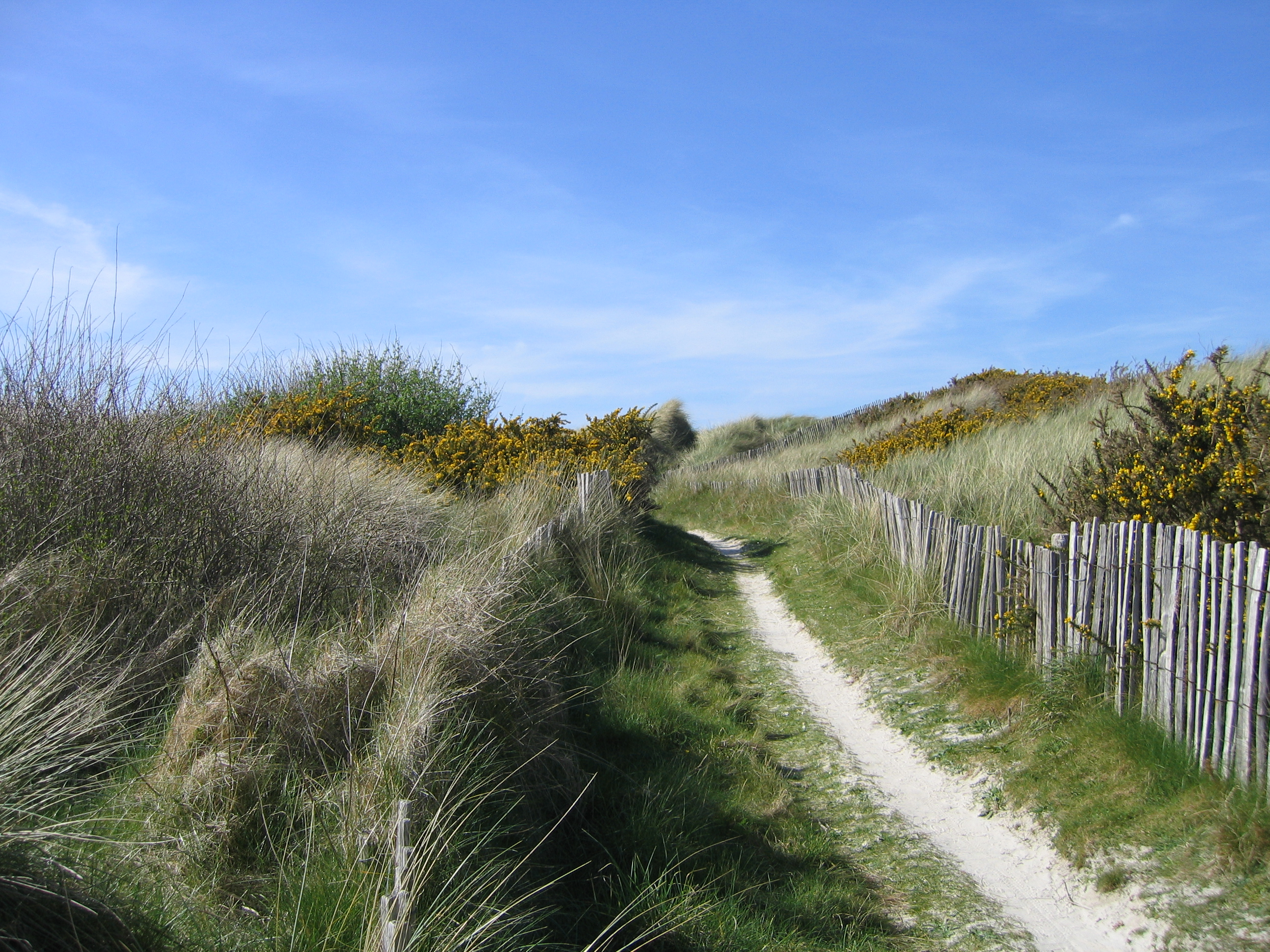
Dune
- The islet of Roc'h-Kroum: located on Theven beach, an archaeological excavation site was initiated in 1978 following the discovery of evidence (gravestones) indicating an ancient settlement on the islet. A cemetery was discovered there, comprising just over thirty graves. The excavations uncovered cist graves, some bones, and fragments of pottery. The cists and structures of these graves allowed the site to be dated to the Bronze Age.
- The Church of Saint-Adrien: or Saint-Drien (17th century) was built according to the plans of Pol de Courcy in 1851, replacing a 15th-century three-aisled building. It is distinguished by its Neo-Beaumanoir bell tower with a gallery, its three bell chambers, and its cylindrical stair turret; the bell tower dates from 1893.
- Saint-Claude Chapel at Dossen, built in 1962.
- The Crosses: the Ty-Coz Cross (Early Middle Ages) and the Kerradénec Cross (Middle Ages). Celtic cross sculpted by Patrice Le Guen for the Jubilee of the year 2000.

On Sieck Island (private property):

- The farmhouse (17th century);
- The sentry box (18th century);
- The guardhouse, remains of the 18th century;
- The barbette battery and the powder magazine (1735);
- The pavilion (in ruins) in the center of the island.
- Bunkers: Numerous bunkers dating from the Second World War are scattered along the coast.

== See also ==
- Communes of the Finistère department
