= Tréflaouénan =

Tréflaouénan Trelaouenan
- Commune
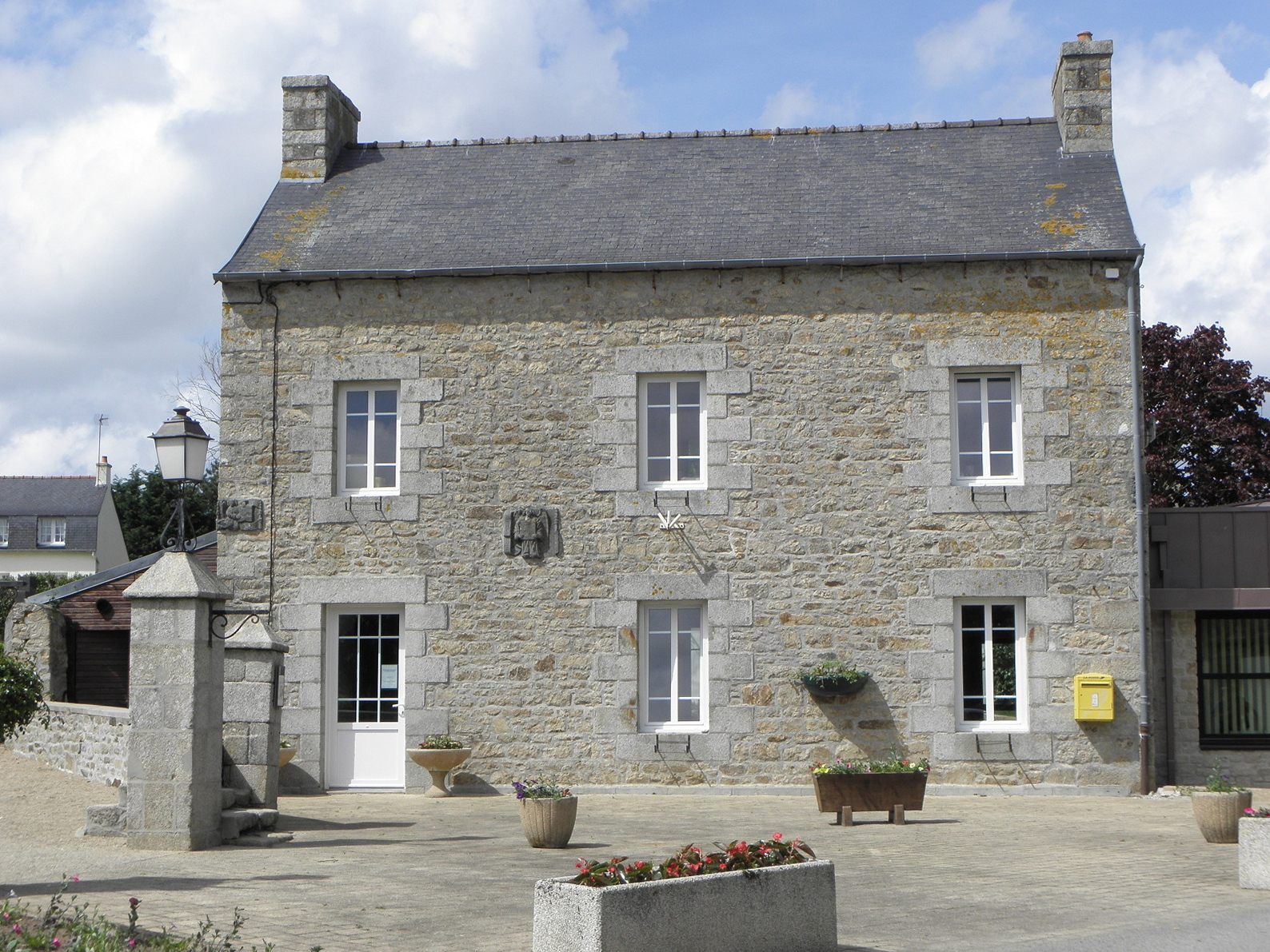
- The town hall in Tréflaouénan
- Location of Tréflaouénan
- Location within France Location within Brittany
- Coordinates: 48°37′43″N 4°05′42″W
- Country: France
- Region: Brittany
- Department: Finistère
- Arrondissement: Morlaix
- Canton: Saint-Pol-de-Léon
- Intercommunality: Haut-Léon Communauté

Government
  - Mayor (2020–2026): Jacques Pontu
- Area^{1}: 8.16 km^{2} (3.15 sq mi)
- Highest elevation: 96 m (315 ft)
- Lowest elevation: 19 m (62 ft)
- Population (2023): 518
  - Density: 63.5/km^{2} (164/sq mi)
- Time zone: UTC+01:00 (CET)
  - Summer (DST): UTC+02:00 (CEST)
- INSEE/Postal code: 29285 /29440
- ^{1} French Land Register data, which excludes lakes, ponds, glaciers > 1 km^{2} (0.386 sq mi or 247 acres) and river estuaries.

Tréflaouénan (French pronunciation: [tʁeflawenɑ̃]; Breton: Trelaouenan) is a commune in the Finistère department of Brittany in north-western France.

== Population ==
Inhabitants of Tréflaouénan are called in French Tréflaouénanais.

Historical population
Year	Pop.	±% p.a.
1968	567	—
1975	519	−1.26%
1982	509	−0.28%
1990	432	−2.03%
1999	434	+0.05%
2007	512	+2.09%
2012	526	+0.54%
2017	510	−0.62%
2023	518	+0.26%
Source: INSEE

== See also ==
- Communes of the Finistère department
