= Trézilidé =

Trézilidé Trezilide
- Commune
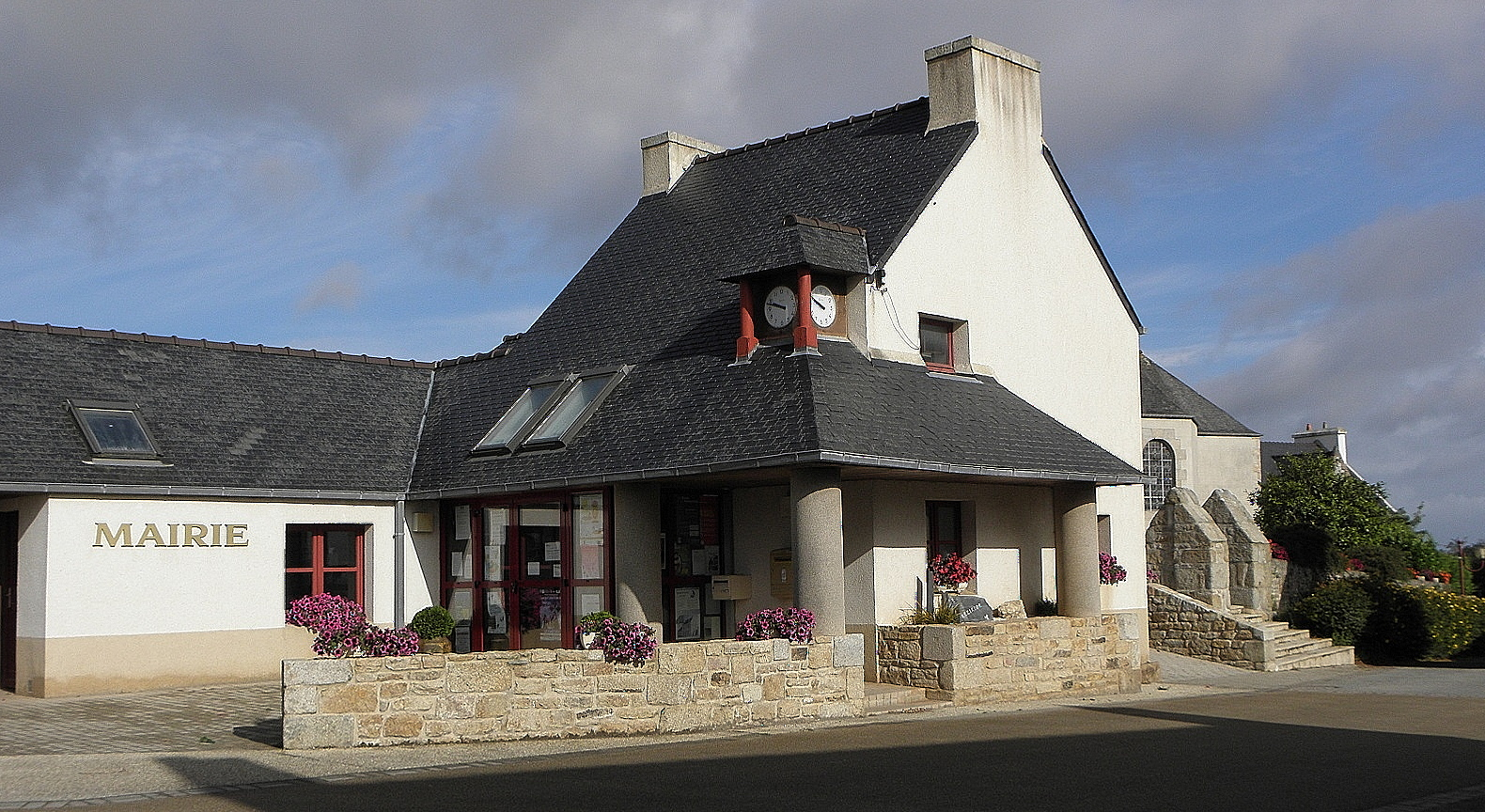
- Town hall

- Coat of arms
- Location of Trézilidé
- Location within France Location within Brittany
- Coordinates: 48°36′35″N 4°05′12″W
- Country: France
- Region: Brittany
- Department: Finistère
- Arrondissement: Morlaix
- Canton: Landivisiau
- Intercommunality: Pays de Landivisiau

Government
  - Mayor (2020–2026): Yves-Marie Gilet
- Area^{1}: 4.60 km^{2} (1.78 sq mi)
- Highest elevation: 93 m (305 ft)
- Lowest elevation: 29 m (95 ft)
- Population (2023): 405
  - Density: 88.0/km^{2} (228/sq mi)
- Time zone: UTC+01:00 (CET)
  - Summer (DST): UTC+02:00 (CEST)
- INSEE/Postal code: 29301 /29440
- ^{1} French Land Register data, which excludes lakes, ponds, glaciers > 1 km^{2} (0.386 sq mi or 247 acres) and river estuaries.

Trézilidé (French pronunciation: [tʁezilide]; Breton: Trezilide) is a commune in the Finistère department of Brittany in northwestern France.

== Population ==
Historical population
Year	Pop.	±% p.a.
1968	272	—
1975	262	−0.53%
1982	213	−2.91%
1990	214	+0.06%
1999	224	+0.51%
2007	268	+2.27%
2012	291	+1.66%
2017	382	+5.59%
2023	405	+0.98%
Source: INSEE

Inhabitants of Trézilidé are called Trézilidéens in French.

== See also ==
- Communes of the Finistère department
