= Plouégat-Guérand =

Plouégat-Guérand Plegad-Gwerann
- Commune
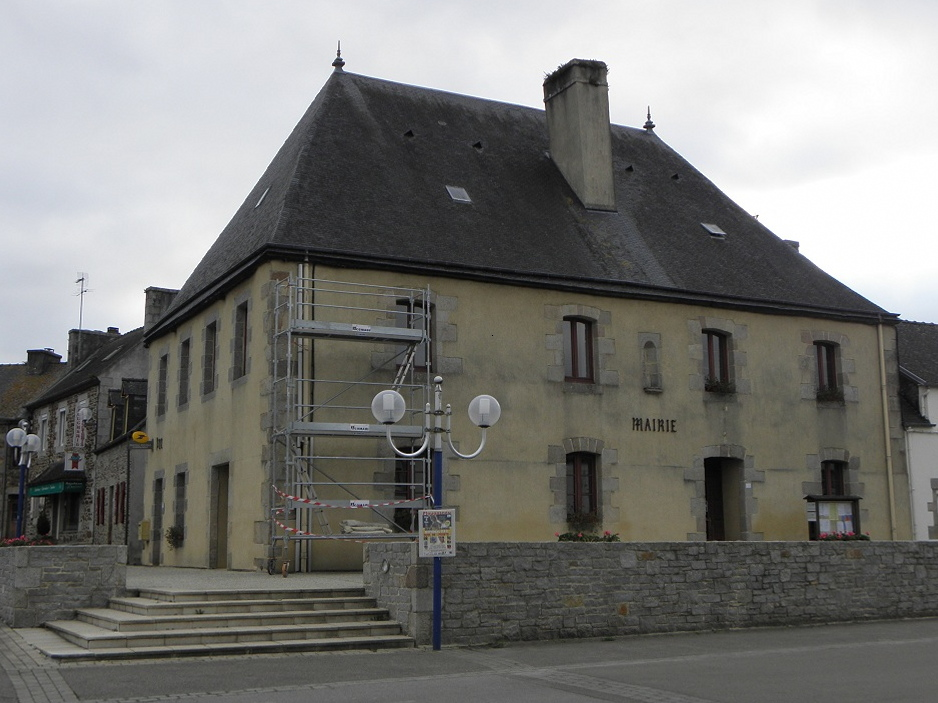
- The town hall in Plouégat-Guérand
- Location of Plouégat-Guérand
- Location within France Location within Brittany
- Coordinates: 48°37′18″N 3°40′27″W
- Country: France
- Region: Brittany
- Department: Finistère
- Arrondissement: Morlaix
- Canton: Plouigneau
- Intercommunality: Morlaix Communauté

Government
  - Mayor (2020–2026): Renaud de Clermont-Tonnerre
- Area^{1}: 17.29 km^{2} (6.68 sq mi)
- Highest elevation: 151 m (495 ft)
- Lowest elevation: 2 m (6.6 ft)
- Population (2023): 1,050
  - Density: 60.7/km^{2} (157/sq mi)
- Time zone: UTC+01:00 (CET)
  - Summer (DST): UTC+02:00 (CEST)
- INSEE/Postal code: 29182 /29620
- ^{1} French Land Register data, which excludes lakes, ponds, glaciers > 1 km^{2} (0.386 sq mi or 247 acres) and river estuaries.

Plouégat-Guérand (French pronunciation: [plueɡat ɡeʁɑ̃]; Breton: Plegad-Gwerann) is a commune in the Finistère department of Brittany in north-western France.

== Population ==
Inhabitants of Plouégat-Guérand are called in French Plouégatais.

== See also ==
- Communes of the Finistère department
