= Plougourvest =

Plougourvest Gwikourvest
- Commune
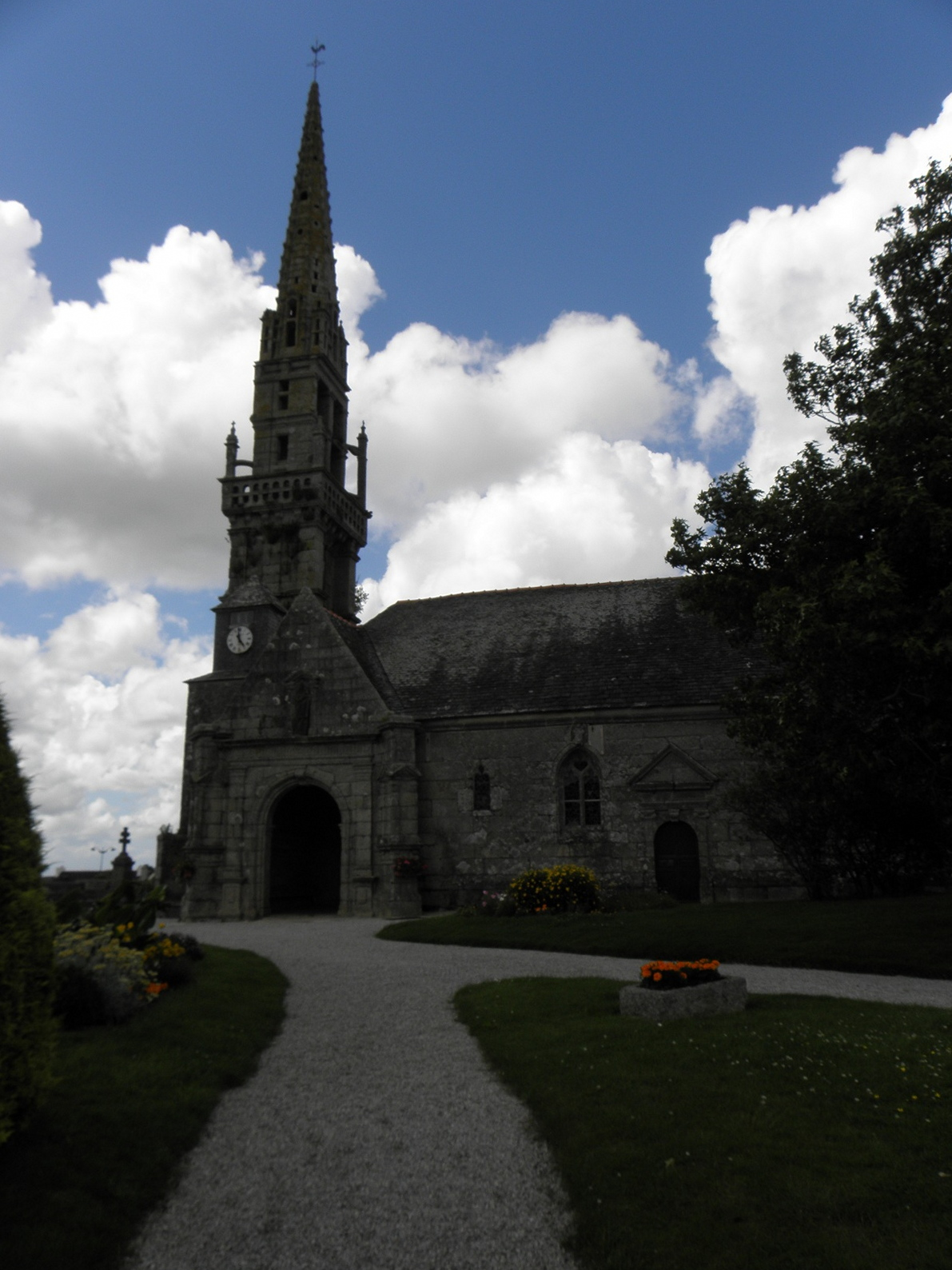
- The parish church of Saint-Pierre

- Coat of arms
- Location of Plougourvest
- Location within France Location within Brittany
- Coordinates: 48°33′20″N 4°05′04″W
- Country: France
- Region: Brittany
- Department: Finistère
- Arrondissement: Morlaix
- Canton: Landivisiau
- Intercommunality: Pays de Landivisiau

Government
  - Mayor (2020–2026): Jean Jézéquel
- Area^{1}: 14.07 km^{2} (5.43 sq mi)
- Highest elevation: 126 m (413 ft)
- Lowest elevation: 62 m (203 ft)
- Population (2023): 1,522
  - Density: 108.2/km^{2} (280.2/sq mi)
- Time zone: UTC+01:00 (CET)
  - Summer (DST): UTC+02:00 (CEST)
- INSEE/Postal code: 29193 /29400
- ^{1} French Land Register data, which excludes lakes, ponds, glaciers > 1 km^{2} (0.386 sq mi or 247 acres) and river estuaries.

Plougourvest (French pronunciation: [pluɡuʁvɛst]; Breton: Gwikourvest) is a commune in the Finistère department of Brittany in north-western France.

== See also ==
- Communes of the Finistère department
- Yann Larhantec Sculptor with work in Plougourvest cemetery
