= Plouzévédé =

Plouzévédé Gwitevede
- Commune
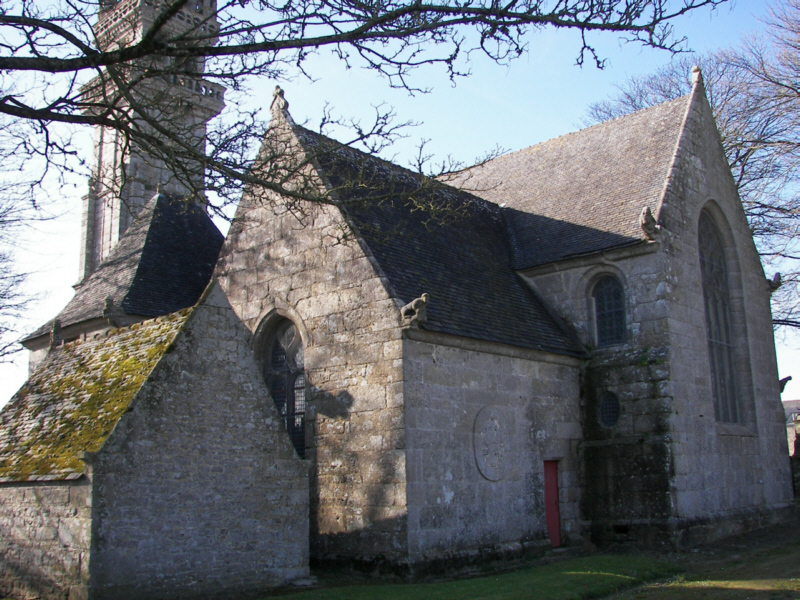
- Chapel of Our Lady of Berven
- Location of Plouzévédé
- Location within France Location within Brittany
- Coordinates: 48°35′49″N 4°06′41″W
- Country: France
- Region: Brittany
- Department: Finistère
- Arrondissement: Morlaix
- Canton: Landivisiau
- Intercommunality: Pays de Landivisiau

Government
  - Mayor (2020–2026): Jean-Philippe Duffort
- Area^{1}: 18.51 km^{2} (7.15 sq mi)
- Highest elevation: 106 m (348 ft)
- Lowest elevation: 40 m (130 ft)
- Population (2023): 1,897
  - Density: 102.5/km^{2} (265.4/sq mi)
- Time zone: UTC+01:00 (CET)
  - Summer (DST): UTC+02:00 (CEST)
- INSEE/Postal code: 29213 /29440
- ^{1} French Land Register data, which excludes lakes, ponds, glaciers > 1 km^{2} (0.386 sq mi or 247 acres) and river estuaries.

Plouzévédé (French pronunciation: [pluzevede]; Breton: Gwitevede) is a commune in the Finistère department of Brittany in north-western France.

== Population ==
Inhabitants of Plouzévédé are called in French Plouzévédéens.
