= Canton of Plouigneau =

Coordinates: 48.57°N 3.71°W

The canton of Plouigneau is an administrative division of the Finistère department, northwestern France. Its borders were modified at the French canton reorganisation which came into effect in March 2015. Its seat is in Plouigneau.

It consists of the following communes:

1. Botsorhel
2. Le Cloître-Saint-Thégonnec
3. Garlan
4. Guerlesquin
5. Guimaëc
6. Lanmeur
7. Lannéanou
8. Locquirec
9. Plouégat-Guérand
10. Plouégat-Moysan
11. Plouezoc'h
12. Plougasnou
13. Plougonven
14. Plouigneau
15. Plourin-lès-Morlaix
16. Saint-Jean-du-Doigt
