= Plouezoc'h =

Plouezoc'h Plouezoc'h
- Commune
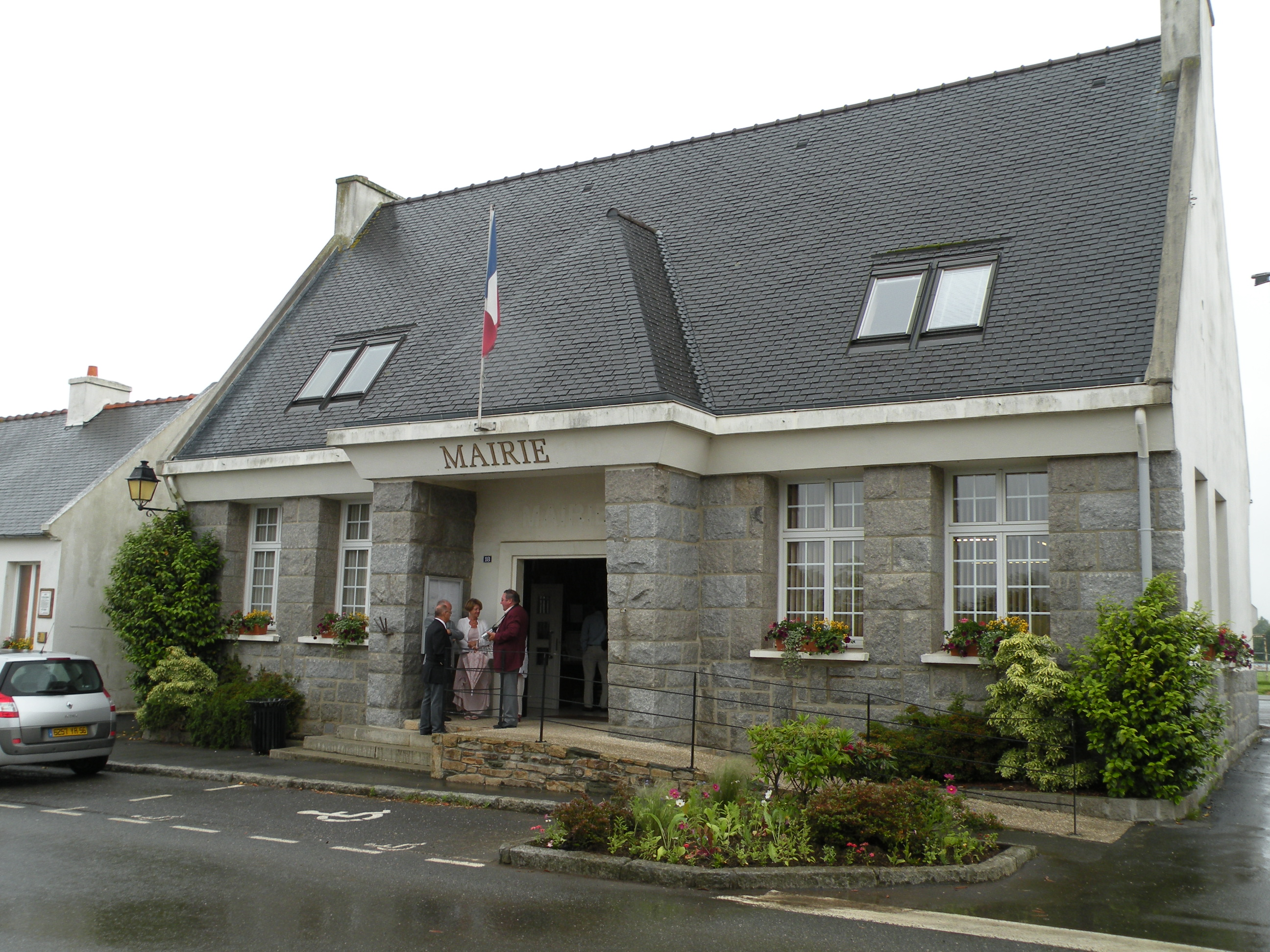
- The town hall in Plouezoc'h

- Coat of arms
- Location of Plouezoc'h
- Location within France Location within Brittany
- Coordinates: 48°38′27″N 3°49′15″W
- Country: France
- Region: Brittany
- Department: Finistère
- Arrondissement: Morlaix
- Canton: Plouigneau
- Intercommunality: Morlaix Communauté

Government
  - Mayor (2020–2026): Brigitte Mel
- Area^{1}: 15.83 km^{2} (6.11 sq mi)
- Highest elevation: 106 m (348 ft)
- Lowest elevation: 0 m (0 ft)
- Population (2023): 1,646
  - Density: 104.0/km^{2} (269.3/sq mi)
- Time zone: UTC+01:00 (CET)
  - Summer (DST): UTC+02:00 (CEST)
- INSEE/Postal code: 29186 /29252
- ^{1} French Land Register data, which excludes lakes, ponds, glaciers > 1 km^{2} (0.386 sq mi or 247 acres) and river estuaries.

Plouezoc'h (French pronunciation: [pluezɔk] or [pluezɔx]; Breton: Plouezoc'h [pluˈeːzɔx], before 2002: Plouézoch) is a commune in the Finistère department of Brittany in north-western France.

== Population ==
Inhabitants of Plouezoc'h are called in French Plouezoc'hois.

Historical population
Year	Pop.	±% p.a.
1968	1,249	—
1975	1,262	+0.15%
1982	1,480	+2.30%
1990	1,625	+1.18%
1999	1,567	−0.40%
2007	1,602	+0.28%
2012	1,580	−0.28%
2017	1,596	+0.20%
2023	1,646	+0.52%
Source: INSEE

== See also ==
- Communes of the Finistère department
