= Lanmeur =

Lanmeur Lanneur
- Commune
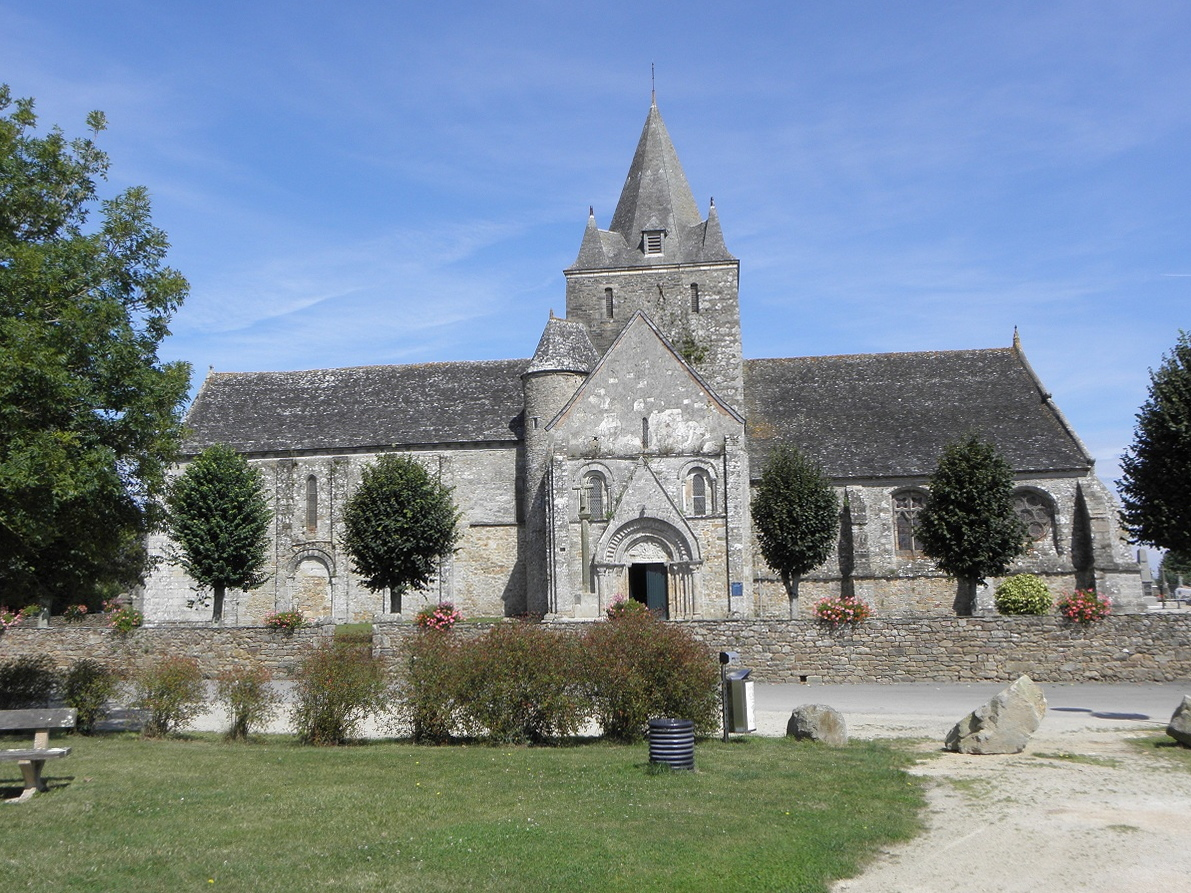
- Notre-Dame de Kernitron in Lanmeur

- Coat of arms
- Location of Lanmeur
- Location within France Location within Brittany
- Coordinates: 48°38′53″N 3°42′51″W
- Country: France
- Region: Brittany
- Department: Finistère
- Arrondissement: Morlaix
- Canton: Plouigneau
- Intercommunality: Morlaix Communauté

Government
  - Mayor (2020–2026): Anne-Catherine Lucas
- Area^{1}: 26.47 km^{2} (10.22 sq mi)
- Highest elevation: 128 m (420 ft)
- Lowest elevation: 20 m (66 ft)
- Population (2023): 2,387
  - Density: 90.18/km^{2} (233.6/sq mi)
- Time zone: UTC+01:00 (CET)
  - Summer (DST): UTC+02:00 (CEST)
- INSEE/Postal code: 29113 /29620
- ^{1} French Land Register data, which excludes lakes, ponds, glaciers > 1 km^{2} (0.386 sq mi or 247 acres) and river estuaries.

Lanmeur (French pronunciation: [lɑ̃mœʁ]; Breton: Lanneur) is a commune in the Finistère department of Brittany in north-western France.

A hamlet in the commune called Kerouac (Breton: Kervoac'h) has been established as the source of the name of the American writer Jack Kerouac. A street in Lanmeur has been named rue Jack Kerouac, and in March 2010 a first Jack Kerouac Festival took place in the commune.

== History ==
The Battle of Morlaix, part of the Hundred Years' War, was fought near the town on 30 September 1342 between the English under William de Bohun, Earl of Northampton and the French under Charles, Duke of Brittany. The result was an English victory and has been viewed by historians as presaging the battle tactics of the Battle of Crécy four years later.

== Geography ==
=== Climate ===
Lanmeur has an oceanic climate (Köppen climate classification Cfb). The average annual temperature in Lanmeur is 11.5 °C (52.7 °F). The average annual rainfall is 984.9 mm (38.78 in) with December as the wettest month. The temperatures are highest on average in August, at around 17.0 °C (62.6 °F), and lowest in January, at around 6.7 °C (44.1 °F). The highest temperature ever recorded in Lanmeur was 36.1 °C (97.0 °F) on 2 August 1990; the coldest temperature ever recorded was −10.5 °C (13.1 °F) on 17 January 1985.

Climate data for Lanmeur (1981–2010 averages, extremes 1982−present)
Month	Jan	Feb	Mar	Apr	May	Jun	Jul	Aug	Sep	Oct	Nov	Dec	Year
Record high °C (°F)	17.0 (62.6)	22.4 (72.3)	25.2 (77.4)	28.2 (82.8)	31.5 (88.7)	34.4 (93.9)	36.0 (96.8)	36.1 (97.0)	32.1 (89.8)	30.0 (86.0)	22.6 (72.7)	18.0 (64.4)	36.1 (97.0)
Mean daily maximum °C (°F)	9.5 (49.1)	9.9 (49.8)	11.9 (53.4)	13.6 (56.5)	16.7 (62.1)	19.2 (66.6)	21.2 (70.2)	21.4 (70.5)	19.6 (67.3)	16.4 (61.5)	12.5 (54.5)	10.2 (50.4)	15.2 (59.4)
Daily mean °C (°F)	6.7 (44.1)	6.8 (44.2)	8.3 (46.9)	9.5 (49.1)	12.4 (54.3)	14.9 (58.8)	16.9 (62.4)	17.0 (62.6)	15.2 (59.4)	12.7 (54.9)	9.4 (48.9)	7.3 (45.1)	11.5 (52.7)
Mean daily minimum °C (°F)	3.9 (39.0)	3.6 (38.5)	4.8 (40.6)	5.4 (41.7)	8.2 (46.8)	10.6 (51.1)	12.6 (54.7)	12.6 (54.7)	10.8 (51.4)	9.0 (48.2)	6.3 (43.3)	4.4 (39.9)	7.7 (45.9)
Record low °C (°F)	−10.5 (13.1)	−8.7 (16.3)	−3.8 (25.2)	−2.8 (27.0)	−0.8 (30.6)	4.0 (39.2)	5.5 (41.9)	3.5 (38.3)	1.7 (35.1)	−3.5 (25.7)	−4.0 (24.8)	−7.5 (18.5)	−10.5 (13.1)
Average precipitation mm (inches)	108.4 (4.27)	88.0 (3.46)	79.6 (3.13)	75.6 (2.98)	71.2 (2.80)	53.9 (2.12)	55.2 (2.17)	54.0 (2.13)	65.9 (2.59)	102.7 (4.04)	109.9 (4.33)	120.5 (4.74)	984.9 (38.78)
Average precipitation days (≥ 1.0 mm)	16.6	12.9	13.3	12.7	10.9	8.8	9.4	9.5	10.3	14.5	16.5	16.3	151.7
Source: Meteociel

== Population ==
Inhabitants of Lanmeur are called in French Lanmeuriens.

Historical population
Year	Pop.	±% p.a.
1968	1,885	—
1975	2,049	+1.20%
1982	2,100	+0.35%
1990	2,084	−0.10%
1999	2,122	+0.20%
2007	2,172	+0.29%
2012	2,195	+0.21%
2017	2,251	+0.51%
2023	2,387	+0.98%
Source: INSEE

== Breton language ==
In 2008, 15.26% of primary-school children attended bilingual schools, where the Breton language is taught alongside French.

== See also ==
- Communes of the Finistère department
