= Morlaix Communauté =

- Communauté d'agglomération
- Country: France
- Region: Brittany
- Department: Finistère
- No. of communes: {{{nbcomm}}}
- Established: January 1, 2000

Government
  - President: Thierry Piriou (PS)
- Area: 680.30 km^{2} (262.67 sq mi)
- Population (2018): 64,438
  - Density: 94.720/km^{2} (245.32/sq mi)
- Website: www.morlaix-communaute.bzh

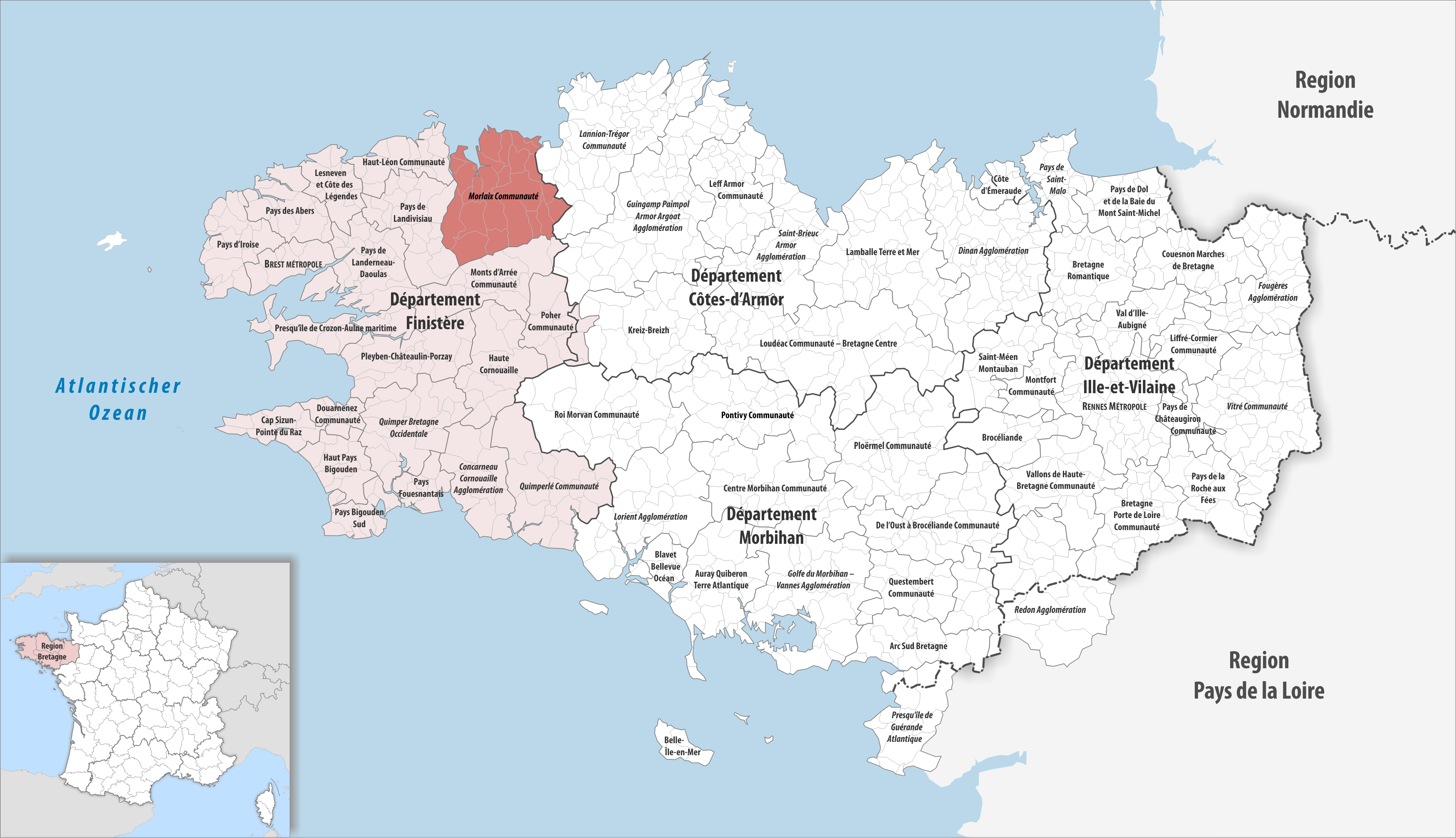

Morlaix Communauté is the agglomeration community, an intercommunal structure, centred on the city of Morlaix. It is located in the Finistère department, in the Brittany region, western France. Its area is 680.3 km^{2}. Its population was 64,438 in 2018, of which 14,729 in Morlaix proper.

== Member communes ==
The Morlaix Communauté consists of the following 26 communes:

- Botsorhel
- Carantec
- Le Cloître-Saint-Thégonnec
- Garlan
- Guerlesquin
- Guimaëc
- Henvic
- Lanmeur
- Lannéanou
- Locquénolé
- Locquirec
- Morlaix
- Pleyber-Christ
- Plouégat-Guérand
- Plouégat-Moysan
- Plouezoc'h
- Plougasnou
- Plougonven
- Plouigneau
- Plounéour-Ménez
- Plourin-lès-Morlaix
- Saint-Jean-du-Doigt
- Saint-Martin-des-Champs
- Saint-Thégonnec Loc-Eguiner
- Sainte-Sève
- Taulé
