= Spézet =

Spézet Speied
- Commune
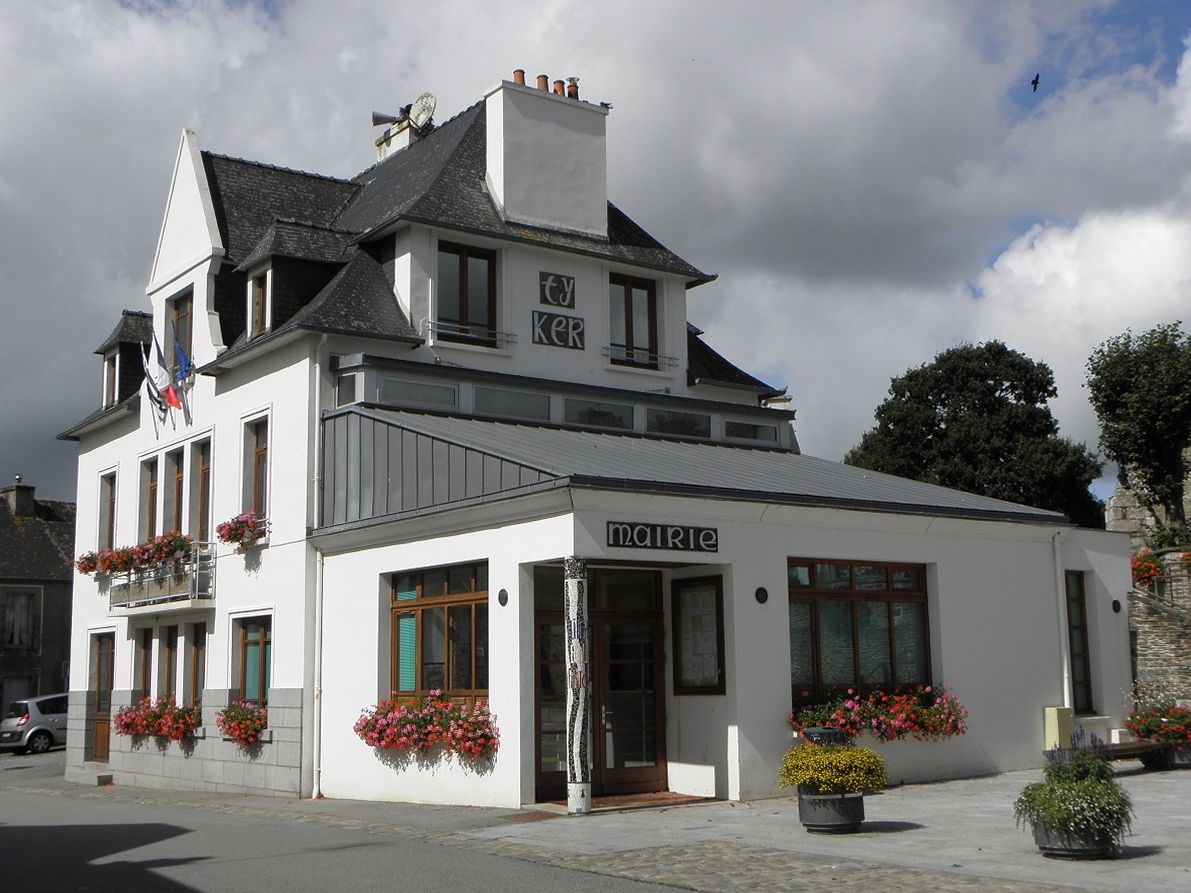
- The town hall in Spézet

- Coat of arms
- Location of Spézet
- Location within France Location within Brittany
- Coordinates: 48°11′34″N 3°42′55″W
- Country: France
- Region: Brittany
- Department: Finistère
- Arrondissement: Châteaulin
- Canton: Carhaix-Plouguer
- Intercommunality: Haute Cornouaille

Government
  - Mayor (2020–2026): Guy Citérin
- Area^{1}: 60.67 km^{2} (23.42 sq mi)
- Highest elevation: 315 m (1,033 ft)
- Lowest elevation: 45 m (148 ft)
- Population (2023): 1,774
  - Density: 29.24/km^{2} (75.73/sq mi)
- Time zone: UTC+01:00 (CET)
  - Summer (DST): UTC+02:00 (CEST)
- INSEE/Postal code: 29278 /29540
- ^{1} French Land Register data, which excludes lakes, ponds, glaciers > 1 km^{2} (0.386 sq mi or 247 acres) and river estuaries.

Spézet (French pronunciation: [spezɛt]; Breton: Speied) is a commune in the Finistère department of Brittany in north-western France.

== Geography ==
Spézet is a rural municipality in east central Finistère, historically belonging to Cornouaille. It is bounded on the west and north by the river the Aulne and Hyères describing large meanders (Nantes-Brest Canal-channel) while at the southeast end of its territory lies Roc'h Toullaëron, which from its height of 318 m is the culmination of the Black Mountains. The village occupies a small hill whose altitude is around 100 meters northwest of the town. Spézet is border by Saint-Hernin to the east, by Gourin to the southeast, by Roudouallec to the south, by Saint-Goazec to the southwest, by Châteauneuf-du-Faou to the west and by Plonévez-du-Faou, Landeleau and Cleden-Poher to the north.

== Map ==
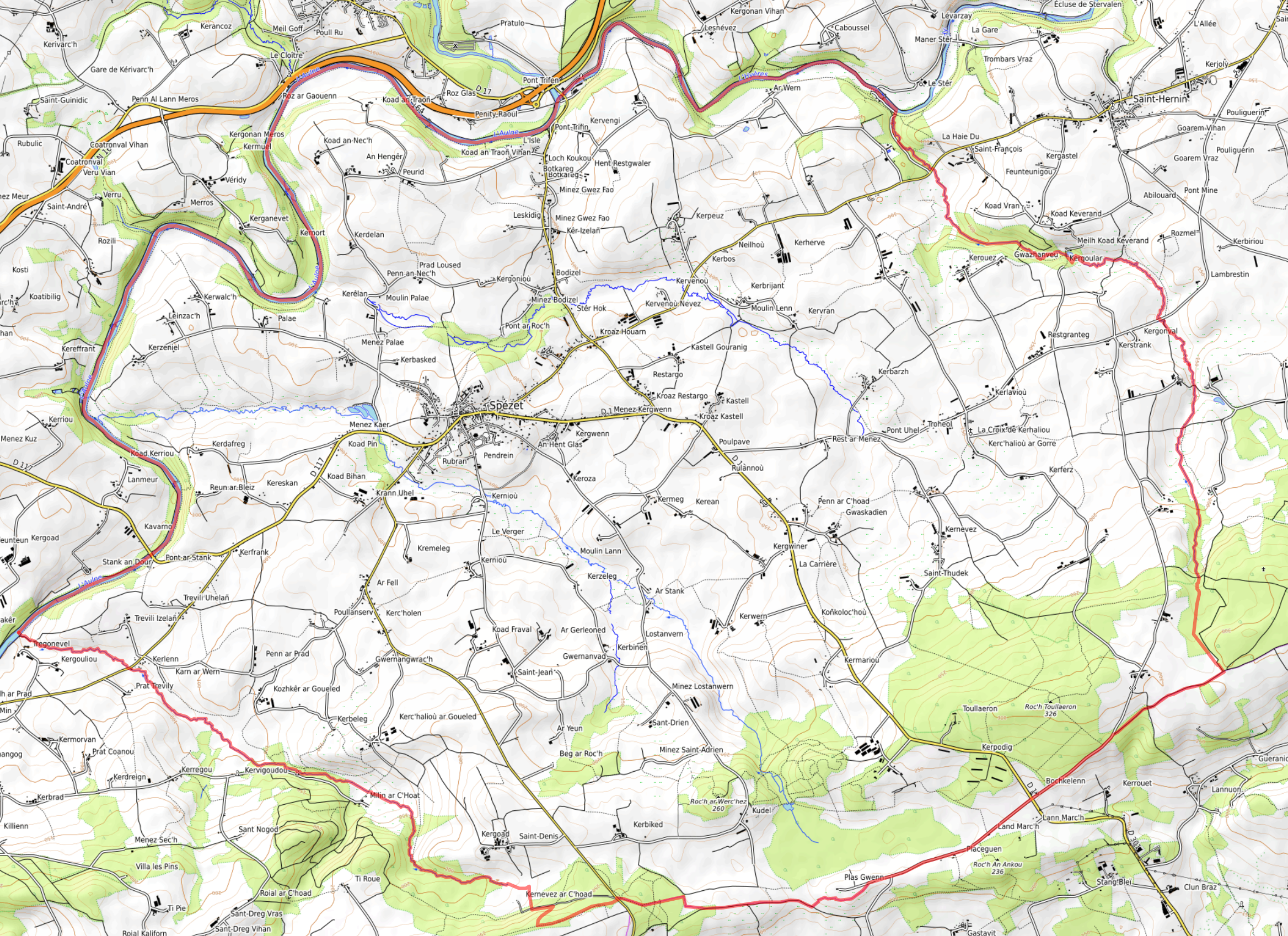
Topographic map

== Climate ==
Spézet has an oceanic climate (Köppen climate classification Cfb). The average annual temperature in Spézet is 11.5 °C (52.7 °F). The average annual rainfall is 1,164.9 mm (45.86 in) with December as the wettest month. The temperatures are highest on average in August, at around 17.5 °C (63.5 °F), and lowest in January, at around 6.1 °C (43.0 °F). The highest temperature ever recorded in Spézet was 37.4 °C (99.3 °F) on 9 August 2003; the coldest temperature ever recorded was −12.4 °C (9.7 °F) on 1 February 1997.

Climate data for Spézet (1981–2010 averages, extremes 1994−2017)
Month	Jan	Feb	Mar	Apr	May	Jun	Jul	Aug	Sep	Oct	Nov	Dec	Year
Record high °C (°F)	15.5 (59.9)	18.3 (64.9)	23.1 (73.6)	27.6 (81.7)	30.5 (86.9)	33.3 (91.9)	34.9 (94.8)	37.4 (99.3)	30.8 (87.4)	28.9 (84.0)	21.0 (69.8)	17.3 (63.1)	37.4 (99.3)
Mean daily maximum °C (°F)	8.7 (47.7)	9.7 (49.5)	12.0 (53.6)	14.3 (57.7)	17.5 (63.5)	20.7 (69.3)	21.9 (71.4)	22.4 (72.3)	20.1 (68.2)	16.3 (61.3)	12.0 (53.6)	9.0 (48.2)	15.4 (59.7)
Daily mean °C (°F)	6.1 (43.0)	6.6 (43.9)	8.1 (46.6)	9.9 (49.8)	12.9 (55.2)	15.7 (60.3)	17.3 (63.1)	17.5 (63.5)	15.3 (59.5)	12.7 (54.9)	9.0 (48.2)	6.3 (43.3)	11.5 (52.7)
Mean daily minimum °C (°F)	3.4 (38.1)	3.5 (38.3)	4.3 (39.7)	5.4 (41.7)	8.3 (46.9)	10.8 (51.4)	12.6 (54.7)	12.7 (54.9)	10.4 (50.7)	9.2 (48.6)	6.1 (43.0)	3.5 (38.3)	7.5 (45.5)
Record low °C (°F)	−12.4 (9.7)	−8.4 (16.9)	−5.5 (22.1)	−3.6 (25.5)	−1.0 (30.2)	1.8 (35.2)	5.2 (41.4)	4.7 (40.5)	1.7 (35.1)	−3.9 (25.0)	−6.7 (19.9)	−9.0 (15.8)	−12.4 (9.7)
Average precipitation mm (inches)	134.3 (5.29)	111.8 (4.40)	87.0 (3.43)	86.0 (3.39)	84.0 (3.31)	48.3 (1.90)	64.2 (2.53)	68.0 (2.68)	75.9 (2.99)	126.5 (4.98)	138.9 (5.47)	140.0 (5.51)	1,164.9 (45.86)
Average precipitation days (≥ 1.0 mm)	16.4	13.6	13.1	12.5	11.1	8.1	10.6	9.0	9.1	14.6	16.8	15.8	150.7
Source: Meteociel

== History ==
During the Revolt of the Bonnets Rouges ("Red Caps") in 1675, the parishioners involved in the ransacking of the Kergoet castle in Saint-Hernin, owned by the Marquis Le Moyne de Trevigny. The parish is to pay 5000 livres as damages and repairs to the said Marquis for the injury. Four residents of the parish were excluded from the amnesty of 1676.

In 1770, according to Jean-Baptiste Ogée, the parish lands were uncultivated in many parts, especially in the mountains where the soil, poor quality, did not allow residents to take advantage of it. The land was actually good in the north of the parish.

In September and October 1779, an outbreak of dysentery caused about 150 victims in Spézet. Bodies had to be buried without entering the church for fear of contagion, under penalty of a fine of 20 livres.

June 24, 1944, ten resistants arrested in Spézet were shot in Lanvénégen after being sentenced to death by the German military court sitting in Le Faouët.

== Population ==
Inhabitants of Spézet are called in French Spézetois.

Historical population

Year	Pop.	±% p.a.
1793	2,531	—
1800	2,559	+0.16%
1806	2,703	+0.92%
1821	2,987	+0.67%
1831	2,631	−1.26%
1836	2,793	+1.20%
1841	2,797	+0.03%
1846	2,782	−0.11%
1851	2,958	+1.23%
1856	2,933	−0.17%
1861	2,922	−0.08%
1866	2,990	+0.46%
1872	2,735	−1.47%
1876	2,960	+2.00%
1881	2,987	+0.18%
1886	3,060	+0.48%
1891	3,166	+0.68%
1896	3,590	+2.55%
1901	3,701	+0.61%

Year	Pop.	±% p.a.
1906	3,899	+1.05%
1911	4,095	+0.99%
1921	3,997	−0.24%
1926	3,913	−0.42%
1931	3,736	−0.92%
1936	3,662	−0.40%
1946	3,345	−0.90%
1954	2,871	−1.89%
1962	2,555	−1.45%
1968	2,299	−1.74%
1975	2,165	−0.85%
1982	2,076	−0.60%
1990	2,038	−0.23%
1999	1,861	−1.00%
2007	1,865	+0.03%
2012	1,802	−0.68%
2017	1,808	+0.07%
2023	1,774	−0.32%

Source: EHESS and INSEE (1968-2023)

== Sights and monuments ==
- Jardin botanique des Montagnes Noires
- Manoir de Menez Kamm (where lived the adventurer and reporter, the Countess Vefa de Saint-Pierre);
- Manoir du Bois Garin;
- Église paroissiale Saint-Pierre-et-Saint-Paul, consacrée en 17198 et son ossuaire;
- Chapelle du Krann (vitraux du XVIe siècle et bas-reliefs) et son ossuaire;
- Panorama du roc de Toull al Laëron;
- Éperon rocheux de Kudel;
- Alignement des menhirs du "Bois du Duc";
- Allée couverte de Kerbasquet

== Twin towns ==
Spézet is twinned with the village of Roundwood, in County Wicklow, Ireland.

== See also ==
- Communes of the Finistère department
