= Lopérec =

Lopérec Lopereg
- Commune
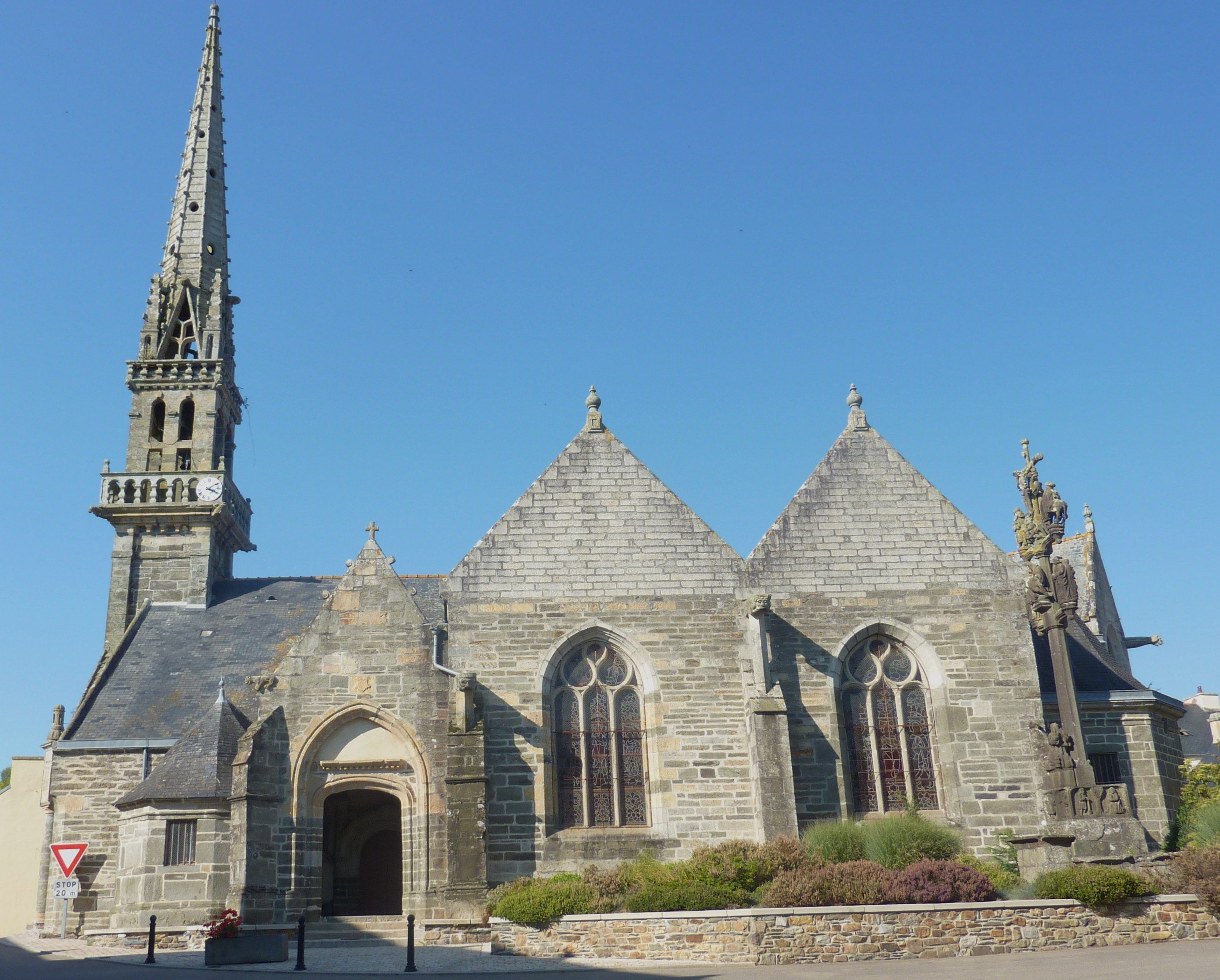
- The parish church in Lopérec
- Location of Lopérec
- Location within France Location within Brittany
- Coordinates: 48°16′41″N 4°02′46″W
- Country: France
- Region: Brittany
- Department: Finistère
- Arrondissement: Châteaulin
- Canton: Carhaix-Plouguer

Government
  - Mayor (2020–2026): Jean-Yves Crenn
- Area^{1}: 39.49 km^{2} (15.25 sq mi)
- Highest elevation: 316 m (1,037 ft)
- Lowest elevation: 11 m (36 ft)
- Population (2023): 828
  - Density: 21.0/km^{2} (54.3/sq mi)
- Time zone: UTC+01:00 (CET)
  - Summer (DST): UTC+02:00 (CEST)
- INSEE/Postal code: 29139 /29590
- ^{1} French Land Register data, which excludes lakes, ponds, glaciers > 1 km^{2} (0.386 sq mi or 247 acres) and river estuaries.

Lopérec (French pronunciation: [lɔpeʁɛk]; Breton: Lopereg) is a commune in the Finistère department of Brittany, in north-western France. It is part of the canton of Carhaix-Plouguer and the arrondissement of Châteaulin. Lopérec is located within the Parc naturel régional d'Armorique. Its name derives from the sixth-century Cornish saint Perec.

== Geography ==
Lopérec borders the Monts d'Arrée to the north and east, and the Châteaulin basin to the south. The municipal boundary, stretching north-south and sloping toward the west, covers an area of 3,959 hectares (39.5 km2). It is characterised by a hilly landscape, with altitudes ranging from 316 metres to 11 metres above sea level, with the village situated at around 52 metres.

Lopérec is approximately 9 kilometres (5.6 mi) northeast of Châteaulin. Numerous rivers are found in the area, including the Douffine which originates from the south-western slopes of Roc'h Cléguer en Brasparts and forms the municipal boundary to Pleyben. Also present is the Rivoal (or Saint-Rivoal River), which comes from Saint-Rivoal and forms the boundary towards the east with the municipality of the same name. Before it passes under the Quimper to Landerneau railway viaduct, it is joined on the right by the Lenturec stream, which traverses the entire commune and passes just south of Lopérec town. Downstream, another small right-bank tributary of the Douffine forms the edge of Pont-de-Buis-lès-Quimerc'h municipality.

== Population ==
Historical population
Year	Pop.	±% p.a.
1968	943	—
1975	769	−2.87%
1982	674	−1.87%
1990	723	+0.88%
1999	714	−0.14%
2007	808	+1.56%
2012	836	+0.68%
2017	859	+0.54%
2023	828	−0.61%
Source: INSEE

Inhabitants of Lopérec are called Lopérécois in French.

== See also ==
- Communes of the Finistère department
- Parc naturel régional d'Armorique
- Calvary at Lopérec
