= Arrondissement of Châteaulin =

Coordinates: 48.20°N 4.08°W

Châteaulin
- Arrondissement
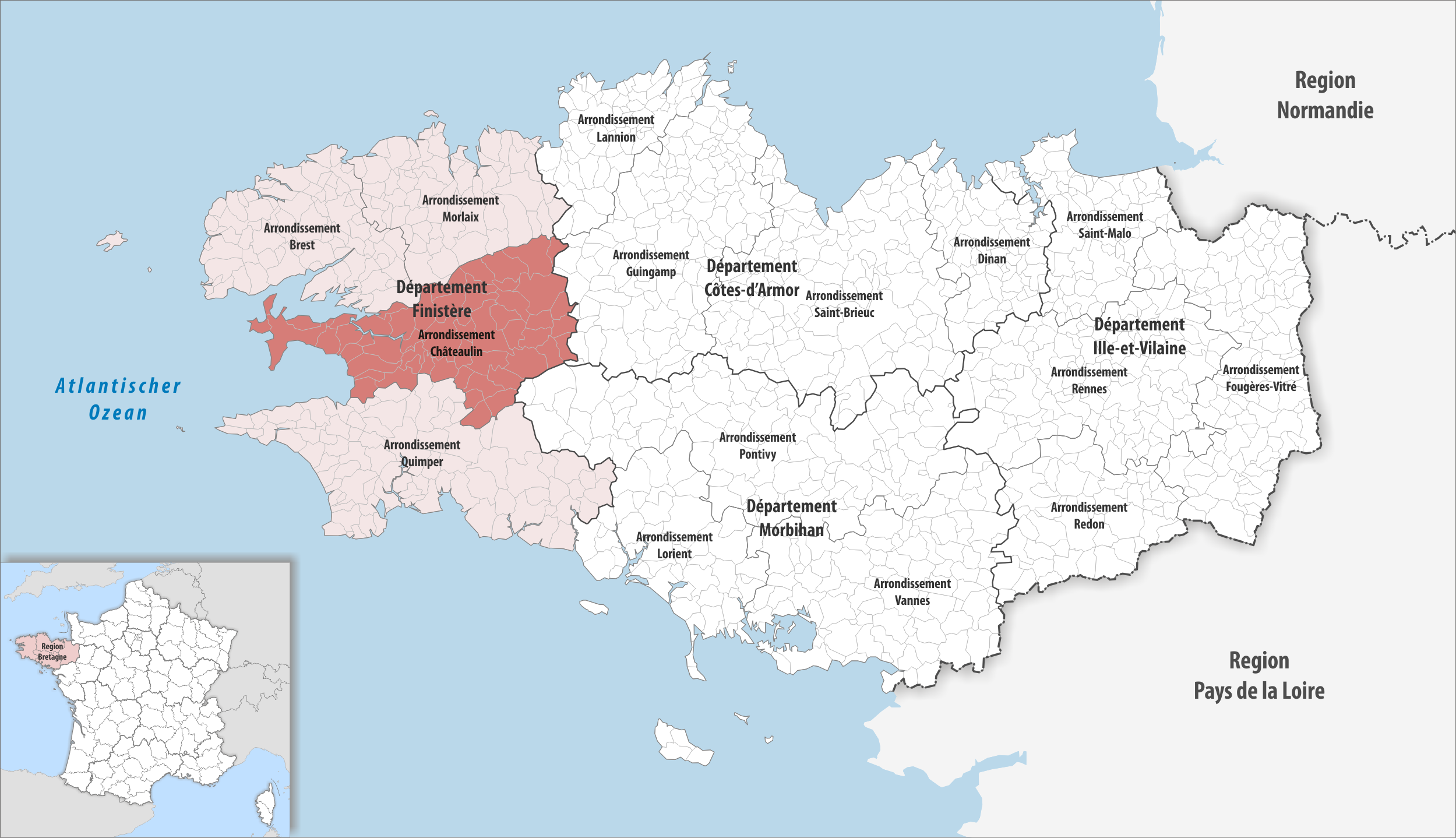
- Location within the region Brittany
- Country: France
- Region: Brittany
- Department: Finistère
- No. of communes: {{{nbcomm}}}
- Area: 1,756.6 km^{2} (678.2 sq mi)
- Population (2023): 82,249
  - Density: 46.823/km^{2} (121.27/sq mi)
- INSEE code: 292

The arrondissement of Châteaulin is an arrondissement of France in the Finistère department in the Brittany region. It has 57 communes. Its population is 81,081 (2021), and its area is 1,756.6 km^{2} (678.2 sq mi).

== Composition ==
The communes of the arrondissement of Châteaulin, and their INSEE codes, are:

1. Argol (29001)
2. Berrien (29007)
3. Bolazec (29012)
4. Botmeur (29013)
5. Brasparts (29016)
6. Brennilis (29018)
7. Camaret-sur-Mer (29022)
8. Carhaix-Plouguer (29024)
9. Cast (29025)
10. Châteaulin (29026)
11. Châteauneuf-du-Faou (29027)
12. Cléden-Poher (29029)
13. Le Cloître-Pleyben (29033)
14. Collorec (29036)
15. Coray (29041)
16. Crozon (29042)
17. Dinéault (29044)
18. La Feuillée (29054)
19. Le Faou (29053)
20. Gouézec (29062)
21. Huelgoat (29081)
22. Kergloff (29089)
23. Landeleau (29102)
24. Landévennec (29104)
25. Lannédern (29115)
26. Lanvéoc (29120)
27. Laz (29122)
28. Lennon (29123)
29. Leuhan (29125)
30. Lopérec (29139)
31. Loqueffret (29141)
32. Lothey (29142)
33. Motreff (29152)
34. Pleyben (29162)
35. Ploéven (29166)
36. Plomodiern (29172)
37. Plonévez-du-Faou (29175)
38. Plonévez-Porzay (29176)
39. Plounévézel (29205)
40. Plouyé (29211)
41. Pont-de-Buis-lès-Quimerch (29302)
42. Port-Launay (29222)
43. Poullaouen (29227)
44. Roscanvel (29238)
45. Rosnoën (29240)
46. Saint-Coulitz (29243)
47. Saint-Goazec (29249)
48. Saint-Hernin (29250)
49. Saint-Nic (29256)
50. Saint-Rivoal (29261)
51. Saint-Ségal (29263)
52. Saint-Thois (29267)
53. Scrignac (29275)
54. Spézet (29278)
55. Telgruc-sur-Mer (29280)
56. Trégarvan (29289)
57. Trégourez (29291)

== History ==
The arrondissement of Châteaulin was created in 1800. At the January 2017 reorganisation of the arrondissements of Finistère, it lost three communes to the arrondissement of Quimper.

As a result of the reorganisation of the cantons of France which came into effect in 2015, the borders of the cantons are no longer related to the borders of the arrondissements. The cantons of the arrondissement of Châteaulin were, as of January 2015:

1. Carhaix-Plouguer
2. Châteaulin
3. Châteauneuf-du-Faou
4. Crozon
5. Le Faou
6. Huelgoat
7. Pleyben
