= Herbot =

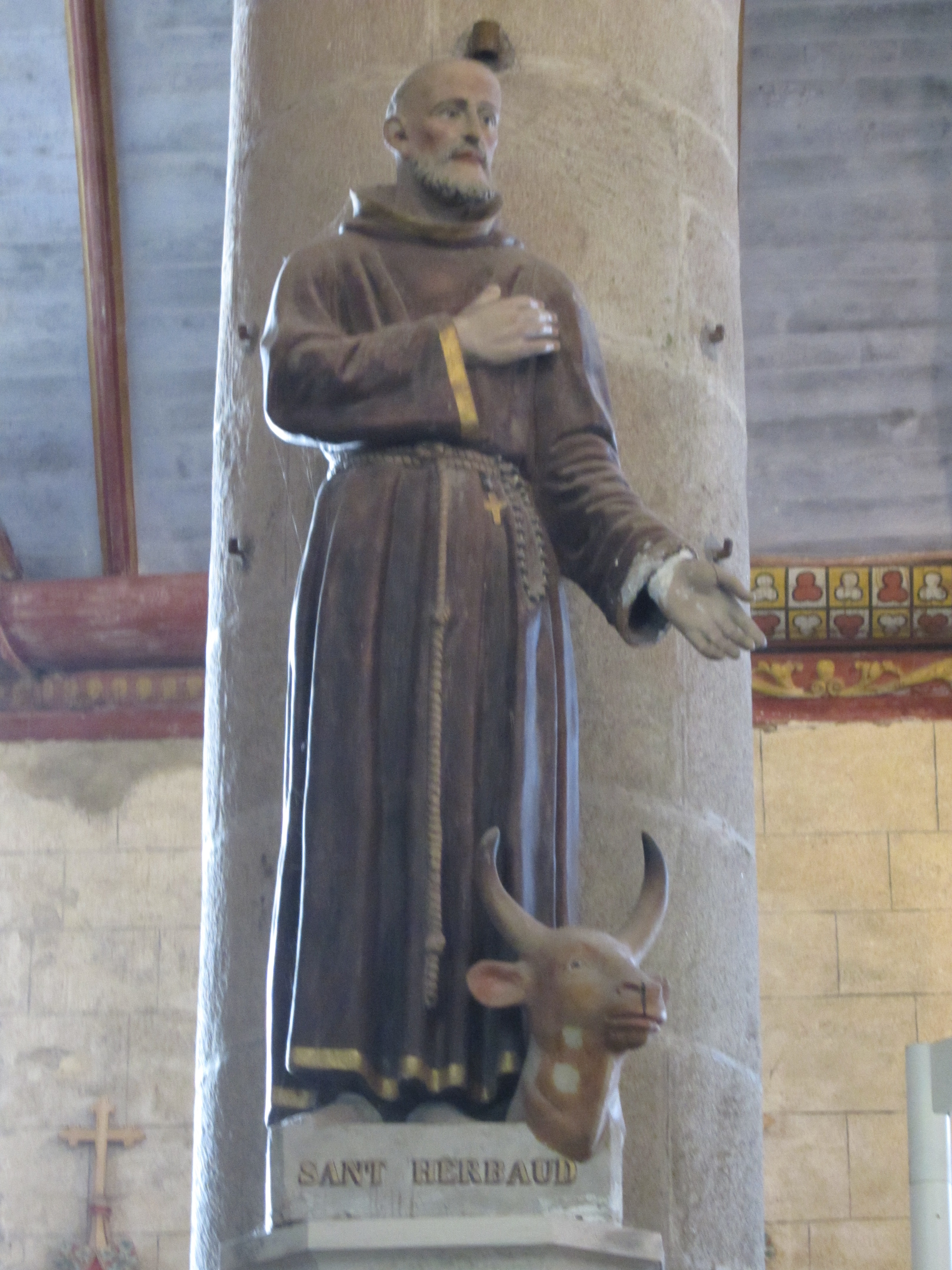
- Statue of Herbot at Pleyben parish church
- Residence: Berrien, Finistère; Rusquec, Finistère
- Feast: 17 June
- Patronage: Horned beasts

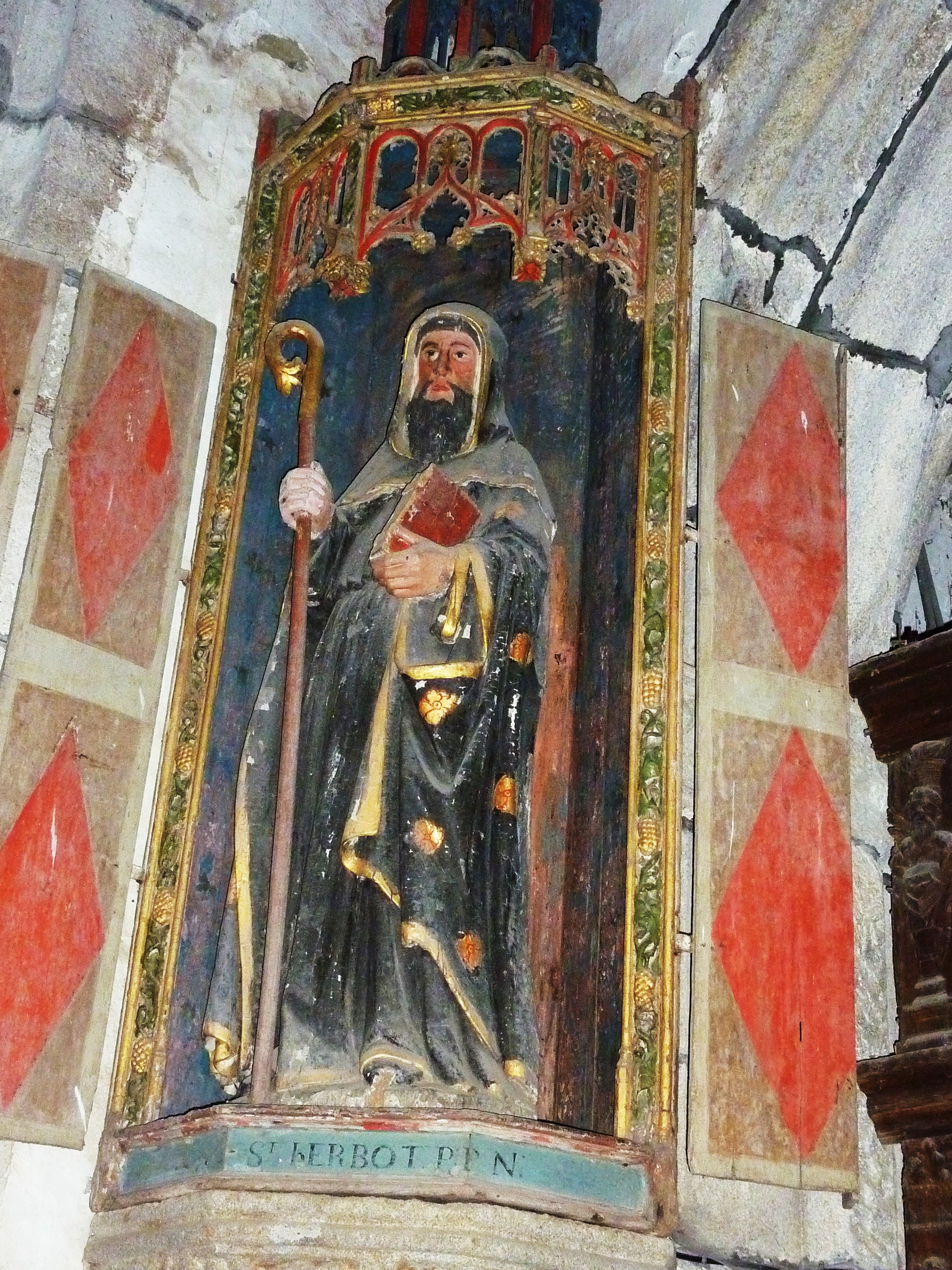
Statue of St Herbot in Saint Herbot's Church, Saint-Herbot, Finistère

Saint Herbot, also called Saint Herblon and Saint Hermelan (not to be confused with Hermeland of Indre), is one of the semi-legendary Breton saints, not officially recognized by the Catholic Church. His cult was very popular among Breton peasants, who saw in him a protector of horses and horned animals. There is a life of him in Latin, the Vita Herbaudi.

== His semi-legendary life ==
The evidence as to the life of this Breton saint is very slight, and estimates of his date range from the 6th century to the 14th. Even his historical existence is not certain, some considering him only an avatar of the mythical Celtic king Gwar or Guéor, supposed to be buried under the tumulus of Roc'h Bleingor which overlooks the hamlet of Saint-Herbot, Finistère.

Christian tradition says that he belonged to a powerful family in Britain, that he came to Armorica and first settled in Berrien where he lived as a hermit in a forest, obeyed even by wild animals, working many miracles and converting many of the inhabitants. According to legend, the women of Berrien rioted against Herbot because their husbands were wasting their time listening to him instead of sowing their fields or reaping their crops. They chased him, going so far as to throw stones at him. Herbot became angry, predicting that the inhabitants of Berrien would never be able to remove the stones from their parish (this is a legendary explanation for the Chaos de Rochers blockfield at Huelgoat, which was then only a hamlet of Berrien) and condemning the inhabitants of the hamlet de Nank never to be able to plough with oxen because they had refused to lend him any.

Herbot took refuge in Rusquec (in Loqueffret) where he was well received; he built himself a house and traded in cattle. He listened, it was said, to their language and was never so pleased as when he could converse freely with them, and began to work miracles. He was buried in Saint-Herbot; in Saint-Herbot church there is a recumbent sepulchral monument to him. According to his legend, when he entered heaven he asked to become the cattle's patron saint. The protection he is supposed to bring to horned animals has given him a real presence in rural areas.

== His cult ==
After he became the patron saint of horned beasts his cult spread widely, with 120 churches or chapels in Brittany housing a statue representing him. He was invoked among other things to make the cows give milk and to help with butter-making, so that he is represented in St Collodan's Church in Plogoff with a lump of butter in his hand. He has competitors: St Cornély is also a protector of horned animals, and, more locally, Saint Thégonnec, represented with a harnessed horned animal in the church of Saint-Thégonnec is locally considered as a protector of ruminants. St Herbot's feast day is 17 June.

Armand Dayot, writing about the parish church of Saint-Herbot, said:

The power of Saint Herbot consists in curing horned beasts. Suffice it to say that his clientele is considerable. During epidemics his power is triumphant, and that is the time when on his altar stand, bloody and stinking, in the middle of swarms of flies, pyramids of cows' tails. For under pain of seeing his animal die, the peasant who has dedicated it to Saint Herbot must, as soon as the cure is accomplished, cut off the freed animal's caudal appendage and place it, with a prayer, at the feet of the statue of the saint.

Packets of horsehair were also offered to St Herbot, and sometimes ended up being put in the lining of ships in order to preserve them from cannonballs.
