= Plouyé =

Plouyé Plouie
- Commune
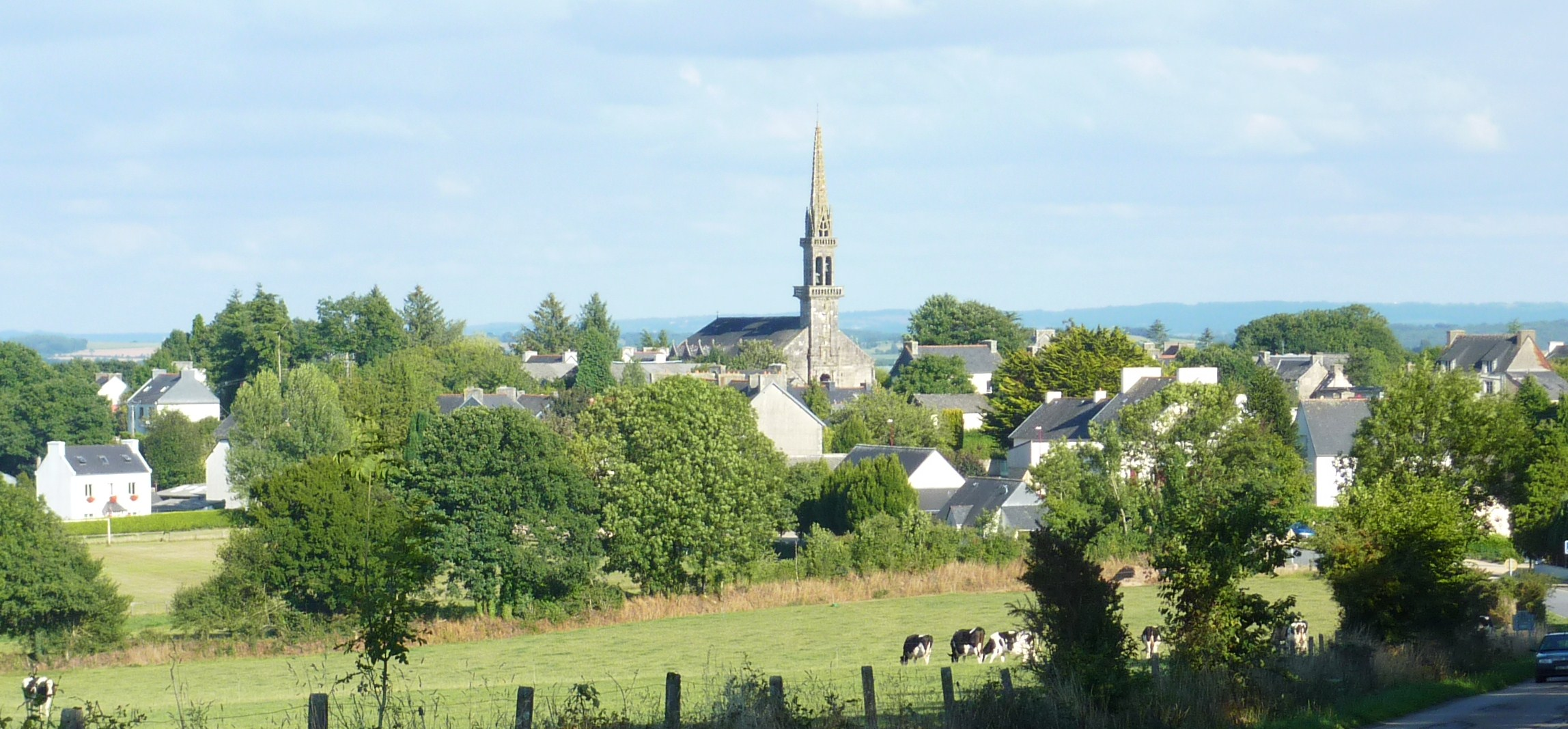
- A general view of Plouyé
- Location of Plouyé
- Location within France Location within Brittany
- Coordinates: 48°18′58″N 3°44′11″W
- Country: France
- Region: Brittany
- Department: Finistère
- Arrondissement: Châteaulin
- Canton: Carhaix-Plouguer
- Intercommunality: Monts d'Arrée Communauté

Government
  - Mayor (2020–2026): Grégory Le Guillou
- Area^{1}: 37.55 km^{2} (14.50 sq mi)
- Highest elevation: 246 m (807 ft)
- Lowest elevation: 67 m (220 ft)
- Population (2023): 687
  - Density: 18.3/km^{2} (47.4/sq mi)
- Time zone: UTC+01:00 (CET)
  - Summer (DST): UTC+02:00 (CEST)
- INSEE/Postal code: 29211 /29690
- ^{1} French Land Register data, which excludes lakes, ponds, glaciers > 1 km^{2} (0.386 sq mi or 247 acres) and river estuaries.

Plouyé (French pronunciation: [pluje]; Breton: Plouie "Parish of Ia") is a commune in the Finistère department of Brittany in northwestern France.

== Population ==
Inhabitants of Plouyé are called in French Plouyéziens.

Historical population

Year	Pop.	±% p.a.
1793	1,310	—
1800	1,753	+4.25%
1806	1,710	−0.41%
1821	1,580	−0.53%
1831	1,940	+2.07%
1836	1,990	+0.51%
1841	1,998	+0.08%
1846	2,028	+0.30%
1851	2,135	+1.03%
1856	2,040	−0.91%
1861	2,053	+0.13%
1866	2,071	+0.17%
1872	1,936	−1.12%
1876	1,989	+0.68%
1881	1,913	−0.78%
1886	1,972	+0.61%
1891	2,031	+0.59%
1896	2,086	+0.54%
1901	2,272	+1.72%

Year	Pop.	±% p.a.
1906	2,243	−0.26%
1911	2,323	+0.70%
1921	2,223	−0.44%
1926	2,195	−0.25%
1931	1,960	−2.24%
1936	1,789	−1.81%
1946	1,670	−0.69%
1954	1,423	−1.98%
1962	1,241	−1.70%
1968	1,048	−2.78%
1975	958	−1.27%
1982	836	−1.93%
1990	726	−1.75%
1999	675	−0.81%
2007	718	+0.77%
2012	724	+0.17%
2017	674	−1.42%
2023	687	+0.32%

Source: EHESS and INSEE (1968-2023)

== See also ==
- Communes of the Finistère department
