= Collorec =

Collorec Koloreg
- Commune
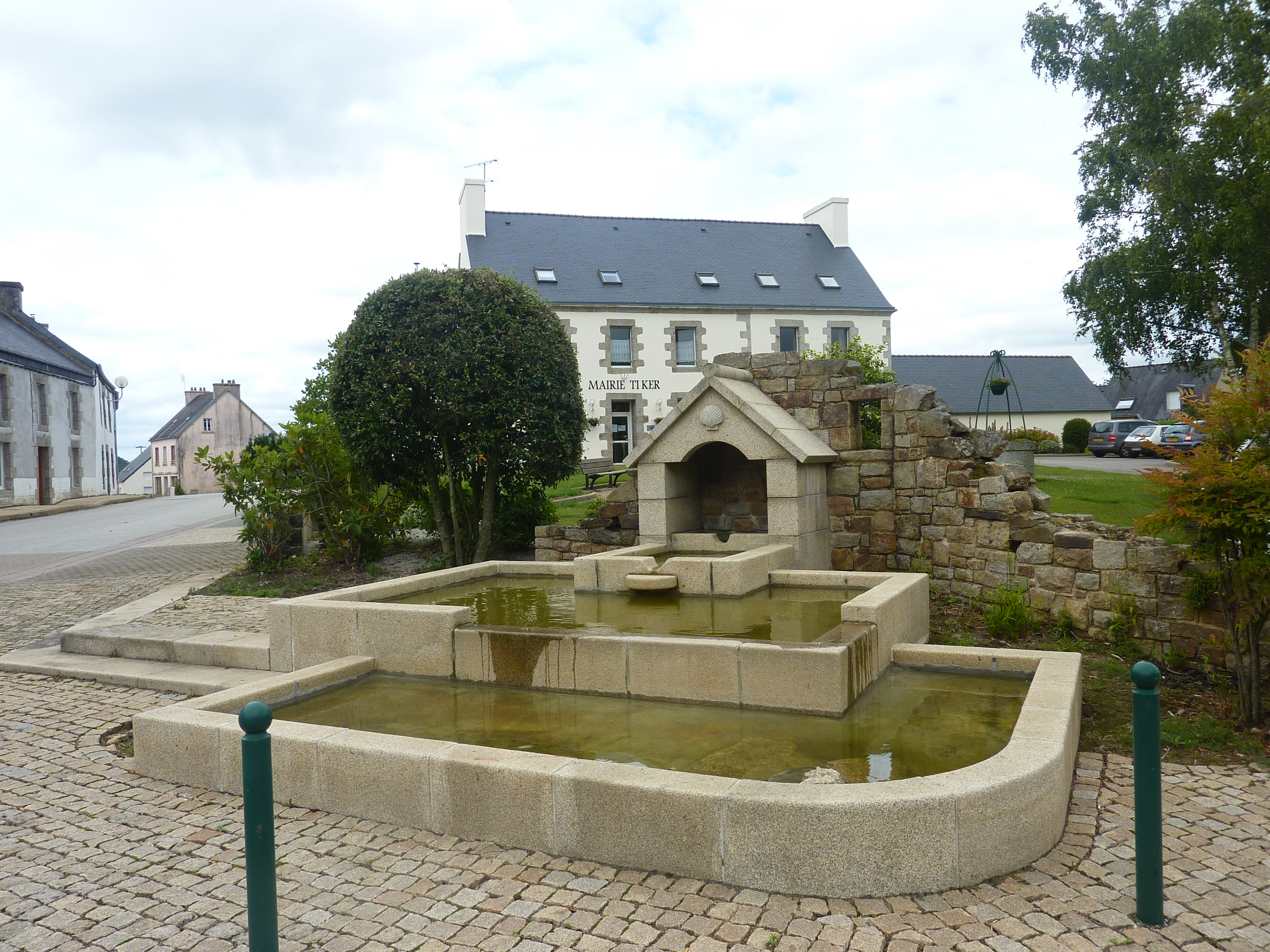
- The modern fountain, with the town hall in the background, in Collorec
- Location of Collorec
- Location within France Location within Brittany
- Coordinates: 48°17′09″N 3°46′22″W
- Country: France
- Region: Brittany
- Department: Finistère
- Arrondissement: Châteaulin
- Canton: Carhaix-Plouguer
- Intercommunality: Haute Cornouaille

Government
  - Mayor (2020–2026): Georges Croguennec
- Area^{1}: 28.00 km^{2} (10.81 sq mi)
- Highest elevation: 221 m (725 ft)
- Lowest elevation: 72 m (236 ft)
- Population (2023): 588
  - Density: 21.0/km^{2} (54.4/sq mi)
- Time zone: UTC+01:00 (CET)
  - Summer (DST): UTC+02:00 (CEST)
- INSEE/Postal code: 29036 /29530
- ^{1} French Land Register data, which excludes lakes, ponds, glaciers > 1 km^{2} (0.386 sq mi or 247 acres) and river estuaries.

Collorec (French pronunciation: [kɔlɔʁɛk]; Breton: Koloreg) is a commune in the Finistère department of Brittany in north-western France.

== Demographics ==
Historical population
Year	Pop.	±% p.a.
1968	1,038	—
1975	891	−2.16%
1982	778	−1.92%
1990	692	−1.45%
1999	647	−0.74%
2007	657	+0.19%
2012	652	−0.15%
2017	611	−1.29%
2023	588	−0.64%
Source: INSEE

The inhabitants of Collorec are called in French Collorecois.

== See also ==
- Communes of the Finistère department
- Listing of the works of the atelier of the Maître de Tronoën
