= Bolazec =

Bolazec Bolazeg
- Commune
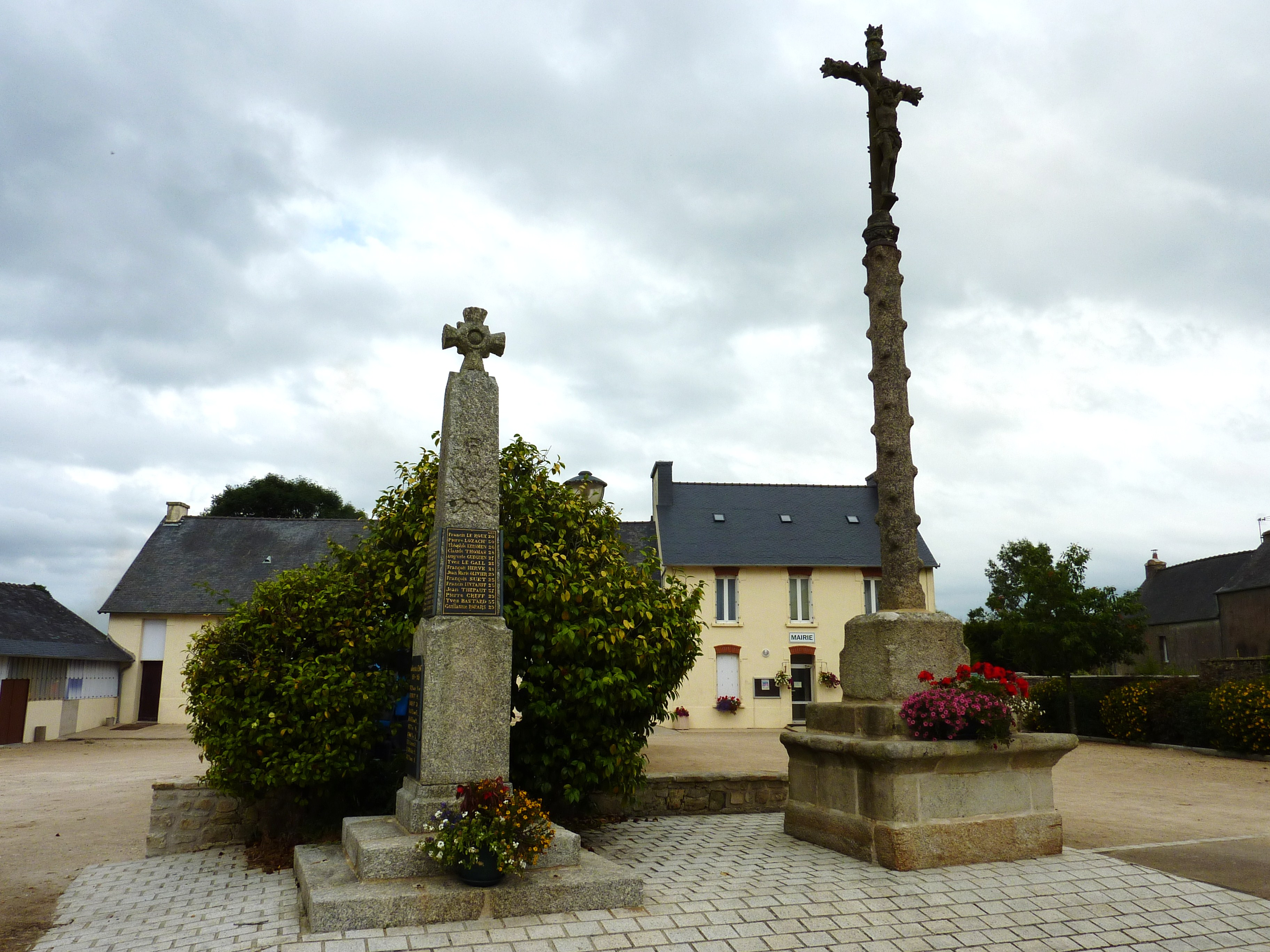
- The calvary, the war memorial and the town hall in Bolazec
- Location of Bolazec
- Location within France Location within Brittany
- Coordinates: 48°26′42″N 3°34′57″W
- Country: France
- Region: Brittany
- Department: Finistère
- Arrondissement: Châteaulin
- Canton: Carhaix-Plouguer
- Intercommunality: Monts d'Arrée

Government
  - Mayor (2020–2026): Coralie Jézéquel
- Area^{1}: 17.47 km^{2} (6.75 sq mi)
- Highest elevation: 268 m (879 ft)
- Lowest elevation: 124 m (407 ft)
- Population (2023): 168
  - Density: 9.62/km^{2} (24.9/sq mi)
- Time zone: UTC+01:00 (CET)
  - Summer (DST): UTC+02:00 (CEST)
- INSEE/Postal code: 29012 /29640
- ^{1} French Land Register data, which excludes lakes, ponds, glaciers > 1 km^{2} (0.386 sq mi or 247 acres) and river estuaries.

Bolazec (French pronunciation: [bɔlazɛk]; Breton: Bolazeg) is a commune in the Finistère department of Brittany in northwestern France.

== Population ==
Historical population
Year	Pop.	±% p.a.
1968	479	—
1975	394	−2.75%
1982	297	−3.96%
1990	243	−2.48%
1999	198	−2.25%
2007	209	+0.68%
2012	186	−2.30%
2017	205	+1.96%
2023	168	−3.26%
Source: INSEE

Inhabitants of Bolazec are called in French Bolazécois.

== See also ==
- Communes of the Finistère department
- Parc naturel régional d'Armorique
