= Botmeur =

Botmeur Boneur
- Commune
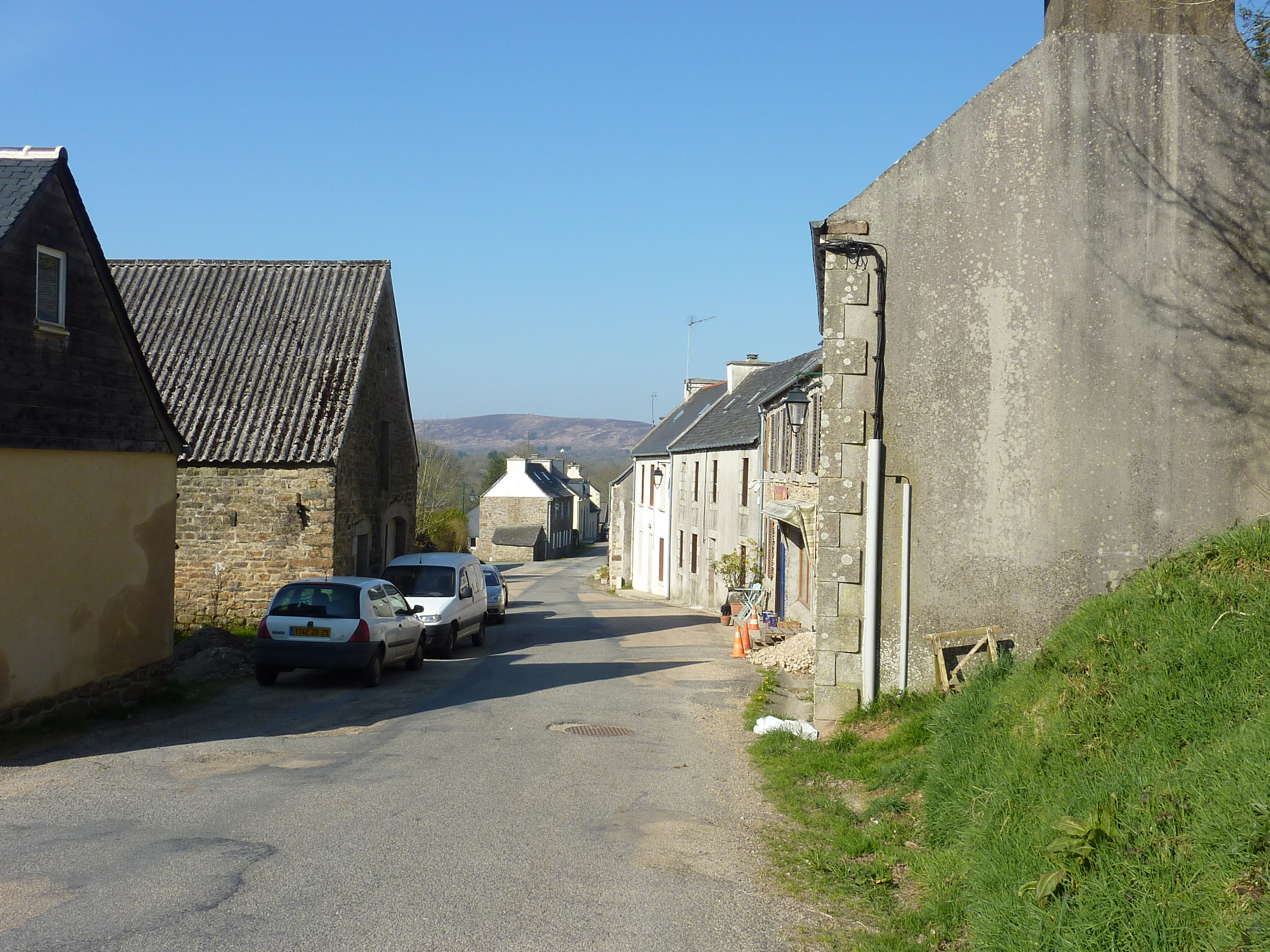
- The main road in Botmeur, in 2010

- Coat of arms
- Location of Botmeur
- Location within France Location within Brittany
- Coordinates: 48°23′04″N 3°54′48″W
- Country: France
- Region: Brittany
- Department: Finistère
- Arrondissement: Châteaulin
- Canton: Carhaix-Plouguer

Government
  - Mayor (2020–2026): Éric Prigent
- Area^{1}: 13.62 km^{2} (5.26 sq mi)
- Highest elevation: 382 m (1,253 ft)
- Lowest elevation: 225 m (738 ft)
- Population (2023): 224
  - Density: 16.4/km^{2} (42.6/sq mi)
- Time zone: UTC+01:00 (CET)
  - Summer (DST): UTC+02:00 (CEST)
- INSEE/Postal code: 29013 /29690
- ^{1} French Land Register data, which excludes lakes, ponds, glaciers > 1 km^{2} (0.386 sq mi or 247 acres) and river estuaries.

Botmeur (French pronunciation: [bɔtmœʁ]; Breton: Boneur) is a commune in the Finistère department of Brittany in north-western France.

== Population ==
Historical population
Year	Pop.	±% p.a.
1968	277	—
1975	236	−2.26%
1982	196	−2.62%
1990	191	−0.32%
1999	214	+1.27%
2007	230	+0.91%
2012	223	−0.62%
2017	215	−0.73%
2023	224	+0.69%
Source: INSEE

Inhabitants of Botmeur are called Botmeuriens in French.

== See also ==
- Communes of the Finistère department
- Parc naturel régional d'Armorique
