= Motreff =

Motreff Motrev
- Commune
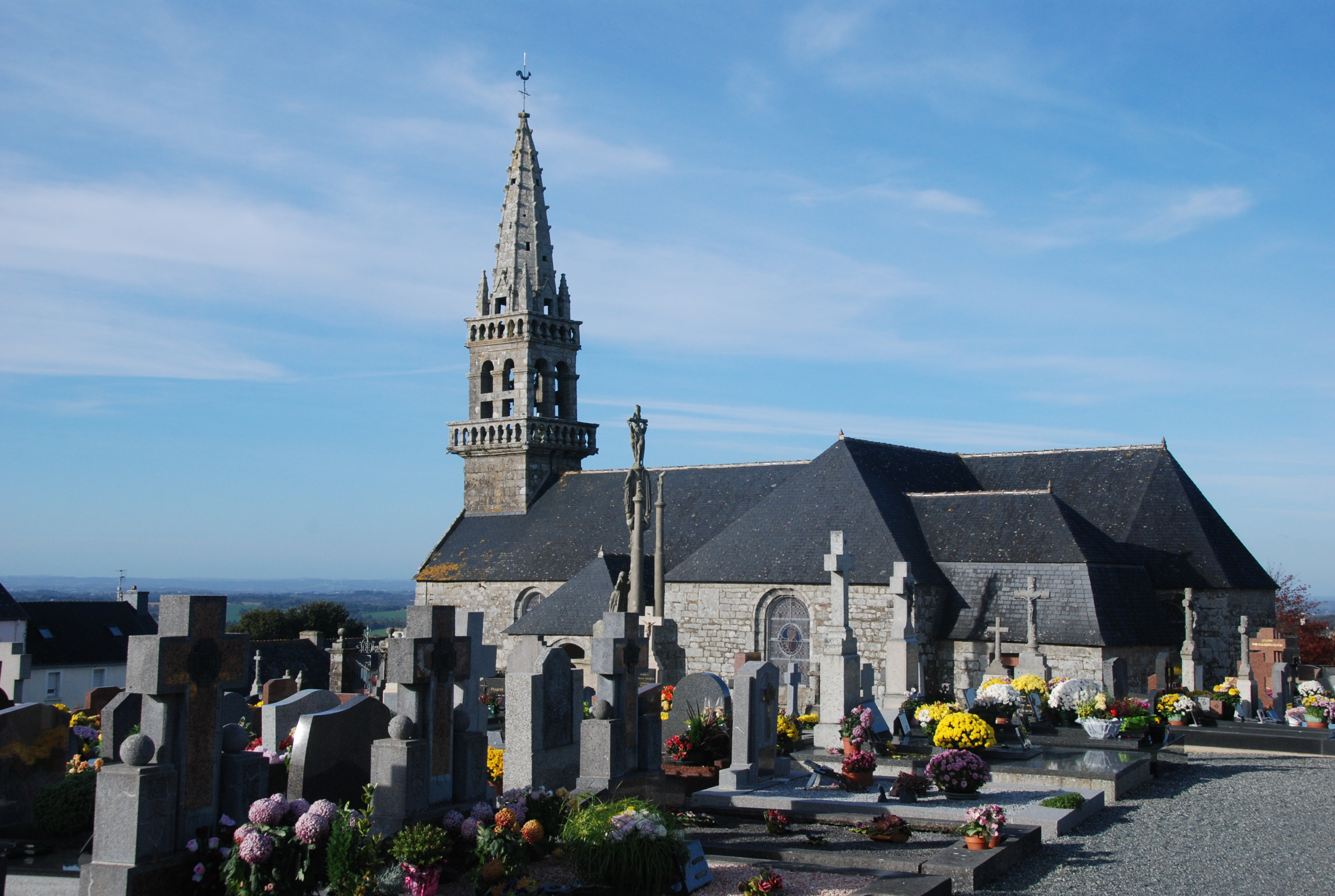
- The parish church in Motreff

- Coat of arms
- Location of Motreff
- Location within France Location within Brittany
- Coordinates: 48°12′10″N 3°33′11″W
- Country: France
- Region: Brittany
- Department: Finistère
- Arrondissement: Châteaulin
- Canton: Carhaix-Plouguer
- Intercommunality: Poher

Government
  - Mayor (2020–2026): Samuel Féat
- Area^{1}: 21.59 km^{2} (8.34 sq mi)
- Highest elevation: 258 m (846 ft)
- Lowest elevation: 72 m (236 ft)
- Population (2023): 654
  - Density: 30.3/km^{2} (78.5/sq mi)
- Time zone: UTC+01:00 (CET)
  - Summer (DST): UTC+02:00 (CEST)
- INSEE/Postal code: 29152 /29270
- ^{1} French Land Register data, which excludes lakes, ponds, glaciers > 1 km^{2} (0.386 sq mi or 247 acres) and river estuaries.

Motreff (French pronunciation: [mɔtʁɛf]; Breton: Motrev) is a commune in the Finistère department of Brittany in north-western France.

== Geography ==
Historically, Motreff belongs to Cornouaille. The village lies on the northern slope of the Montagnes Noires (french, Black Mountains). The village centre is located 8 km (5.0 mi) south of Carhaix-Plouguer.

== Population ==
Inhabitants of Motreff are called in French Motreffois.

Historical population

Year	Pop.	±% p.a.
1793	885	—
1800	1,320	+5.88%
1806	883	−6.48%
1821	815	−0.53%
1831	987	+1.93%
1836	939	−0.99%
1841	1,004	+1.35%
1846	1,028	+0.47%
1851	1,062	+0.65%
1856	1,074	+0.22%
1861	1,040	−0.64%
1866	1,118	+1.46%
1872	1,071	−0.71%
1876	1,186	+2.58%
1881	1,066	−2.11%
1886	1,148	+1.49%
1891	1,157	+0.16%
1896	1,265	+1.80%
1901	1,362	+1.49%

Year	Pop.	±% p.a.
1906	1,504	+2.00%
1911	1,507	+0.04%
1921	1,425	−0.56%
1926	1,407	−0.25%
1931	1,279	−1.89%
1936	1,202	−1.23%
1946	1,070	−1.16%
1954	1,014	−0.67%
1962	861	−2.02%
1968	753	−2.21%
1975	646	−2.17%
1982	646	+0.00%
1990	664	+0.34%
1999	665	+0.02%
2007	723	+1.05%
2012	721	−0.06%
2017	703	−0.50%
2023	654	−1.20%

Source: EHESS and INSEE (1968-2023)

== Map ==
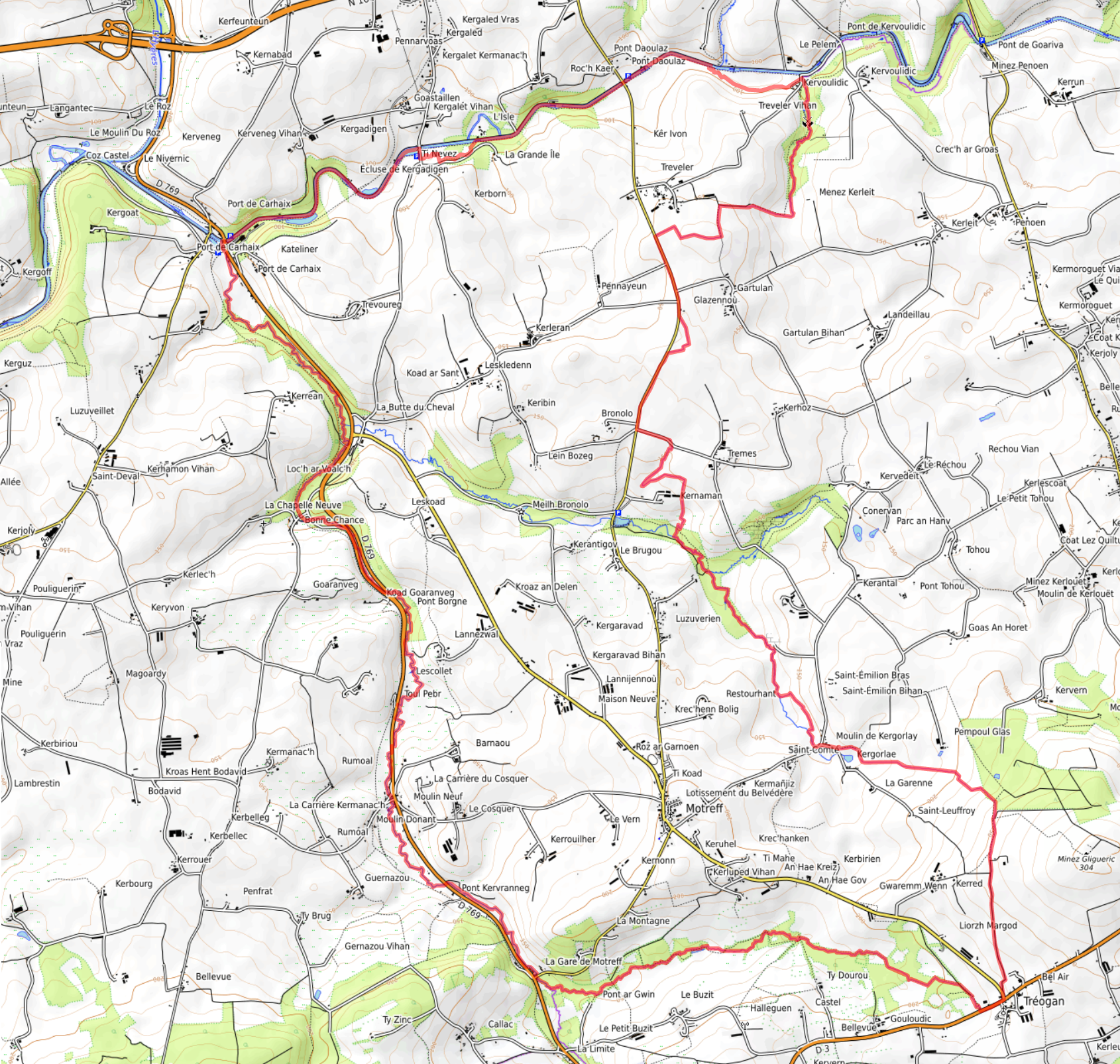
Topographic map

== See also ==
- Communes of the Finistère department
