= La Feuillée =

La Feuillée Ar Fouilhez
- Commune
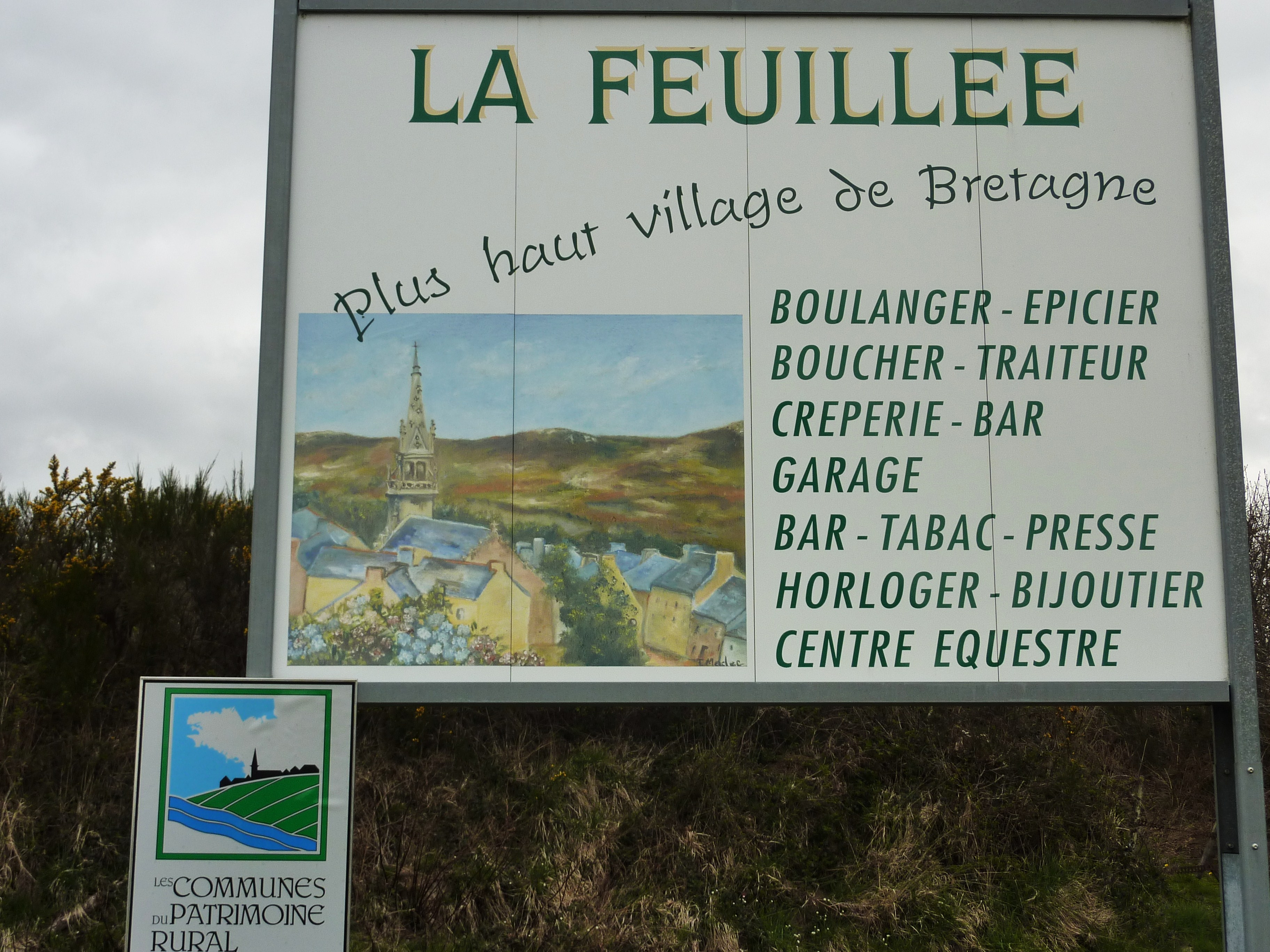
- La Feuillée, the highest village in Brittany

- Coat of arms
- Location of La Feuillée
- Location within France Location within Brittany
- Coordinates: 48°23′33″N 3°51′08″W
- Country: France
- Region: Brittany
- Department: Finistère
- Arrondissement: Châteaulin
- Canton: Carhaix-Plouguer
- Intercommunality: Monts d'Arrée Communauté

Government
  - Mayor (2020–2026): Jean-François Dumonteil
- Area^{1}: 31.55 km^{2} (12.18 sq mi)
- Highest elevation: 381 m (1,250 ft)
- Lowest elevation: 192 m (630 ft)
- Population (2023): 677
  - Density: 21.5/km^{2} (55.6/sq mi)
- Time zone: UTC+01:00 (CET)
  - Summer (DST): UTC+02:00 (CEST)
- INSEE/Postal code: 29054 /29690
- ^{1} French Land Register data, which excludes lakes, ponds, glaciers > 1 km^{2} (0.386 sq mi or 247 acres) and river estuaries.

La Feuillée (French pronunciation: [la fœje]; Breton: Ar Fouilhez) is a commune in the Finistère department of Brittany in north-western France.

== Population ==
Historical population
Year	Pop.	±% p.a.
1968	781	—
1975	691	−1.73%
1982	619	−1.56%
1990	555	−1.35%
1999	604	+0.94%
2007	674	+1.38%
2012	644	−0.91%
2017	641	−0.09%
2023	677	+0.91%
Source: INSEE

Inhabitants of La Feuillée are called in French Feuillantins. The population has been divided by three since the year 1881.

== Geography ==
The village is situated in the Monts d'Arrée, a moorland area in the northern part of the Finistère. The village centre is located 21 km (13 mi) south of Morlaix and 47 km (29 mi) east of Brest. The village centre is the highest in Brittany. It is at an altitude of 275 meters. It is surrounded by several high peaks : the Roc'h Trevezel (385 meters), the Roc'h Tredudon (385 meters).

== Map ==
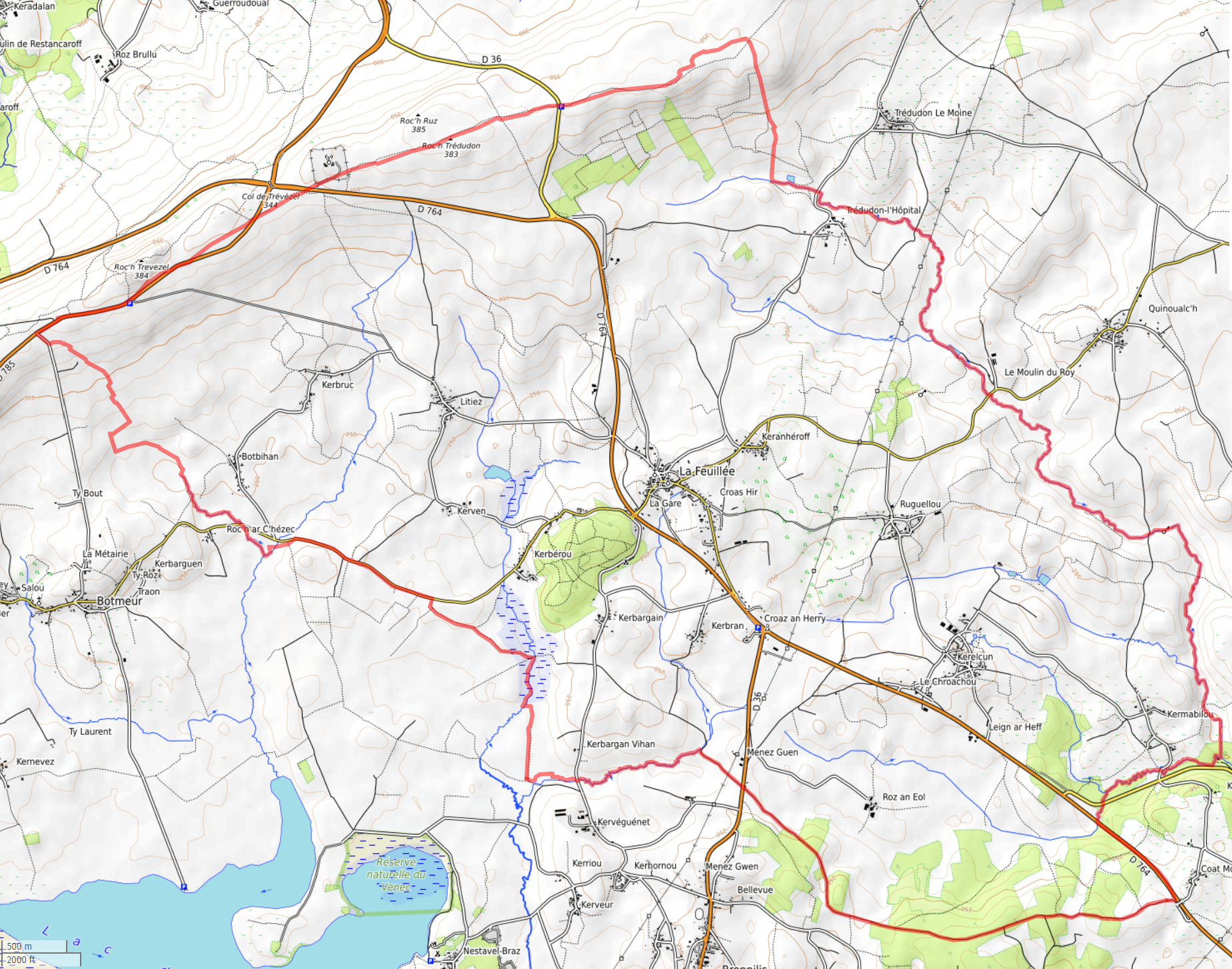
Topographic map

== See also ==
- Communes of the Finistère department
- Parc naturel régional d'Armorique
