= Kergloff =

Kergloff Kerglof
- Commune
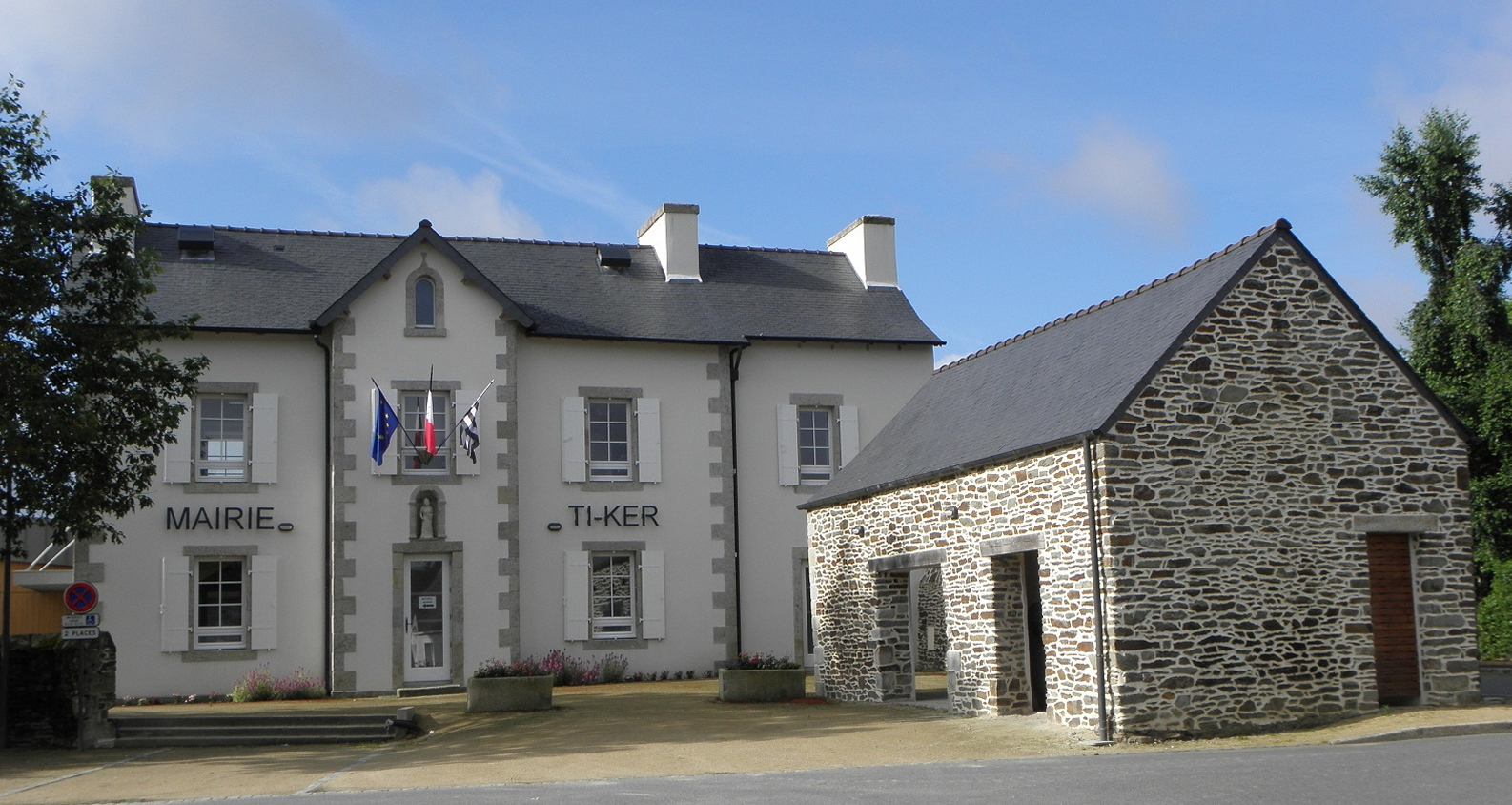
- The town hall in Kergloff
- Location of Kergloff
- Location within France Location within Brittany
- Coordinates: 48°16′31″N 3°37′06″W
- Country: France
- Region: Brittany
- Department: Finistère
- Arrondissement: Châteaulin
- Canton: Carhaix-Plouguer
- Intercommunality: Poher

Government
  - Mayor (2020–2026): Patrick Urien
- Area^{1}: 24.94 km^{2} (9.63 sq mi)
- Highest elevation: 172 m (564 ft)
- Lowest elevation: 57 m (187 ft)
- Population (2023): 897
  - Density: 36.0/km^{2} (93.2/sq mi)
- Time zone: UTC+01:00 (CET)
  - Summer (DST): UTC+02:00 (CEST)
- INSEE/Postal code: 29089 /29270
- ^{1} French Land Register data, which excludes lakes, ponds, glaciers > 1 km^{2} (0.386 sq mi or 247 acres) and river estuaries.

Kergloff (French pronunciation: [kɛʁɡlɔf]; Breton: Kerglof) is a commune in the Finistère department of Brittany in north-western France.

== Population ==
Historical population
| Year | Pop. | ±% p.a. |
|---|---|---|
| 1968 | 630 | — |
| 1975 | 558 | −1.72% |
| 1982 | 610 | +1.28% |
| 1990 | 720 | +2.09% |
| 1999 | 745 | +0.38% |
| 2007 | 905 | +2.46% |
| 2012 | 942 | +0.80% |
| 2017 | 880 | −1.35% |
| 2023 | 897 | +0.32% |
Source: INSEE

Inhabitants of Kergloff are called in French Kergloffistes.

== Map ==
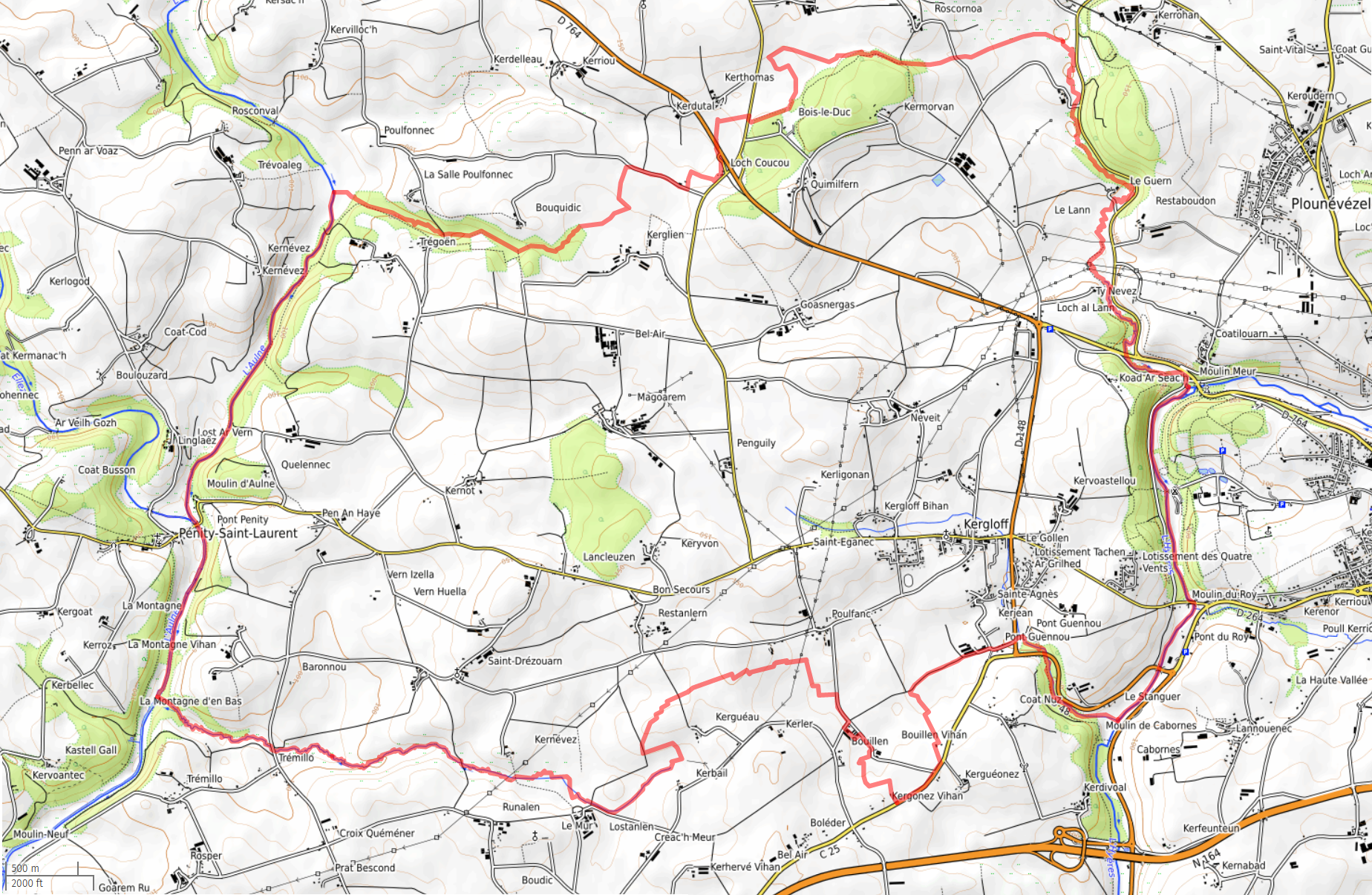
Topographic map

== See also ==
- Communes of the Finistère department
- Listing of the works of the atelier of the Maître de Tronoën
