= Scrignac =

Scrignac Skrigneg
- Commune
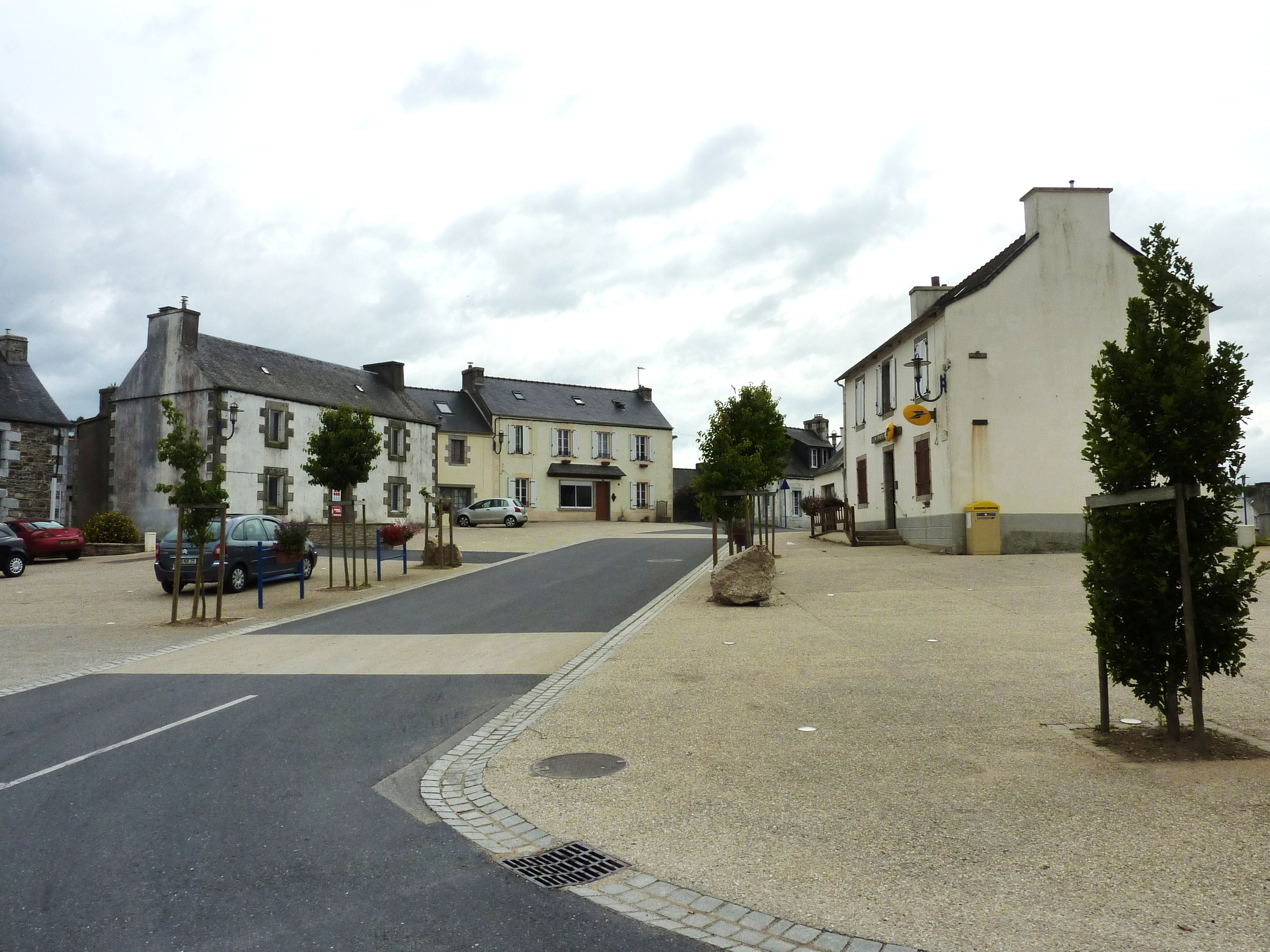
- The main square in Scrignac, in 2010
- Location of Scrignac
- Location within France Location within Brittany
- Coordinates: 48°26′01″N 3°40′34″W
- Country: France
- Region: Brittany
- Department: Finistère
- Arrondissement: Châteaulin
- Canton: Carhaix-Plouguer
- Intercommunality: Monts d'Arrée

Government
  - Mayor (2020–2026): Georges Morvan
- Area^{1}: 70.94 km^{2} (27.39 sq mi)
- Highest elevation: 281 m (922 ft)
- Lowest elevation: 86 m (282 ft)
- Population (2023): 816
  - Density: 11.5/km^{2} (29.8/sq mi)
- Time zone: UTC+01:00 (CET)
  - Summer (DST): UTC+02:00 (CEST)
- INSEE/Postal code: 29275 /29640
- ^{1} French Land Register data, which excludes lakes, ponds, glaciers > 1 km^{2} (0.386 sq mi or 247 acres) and river estuaries.

Scrignac (French pronunciation: [skʁiɲak]; Breton: Skrigneg) is a commune in the Finistère department of Brittany in north-western France.

== Population ==
Inhabitants of Scrignac are called in French Scrignaciens.

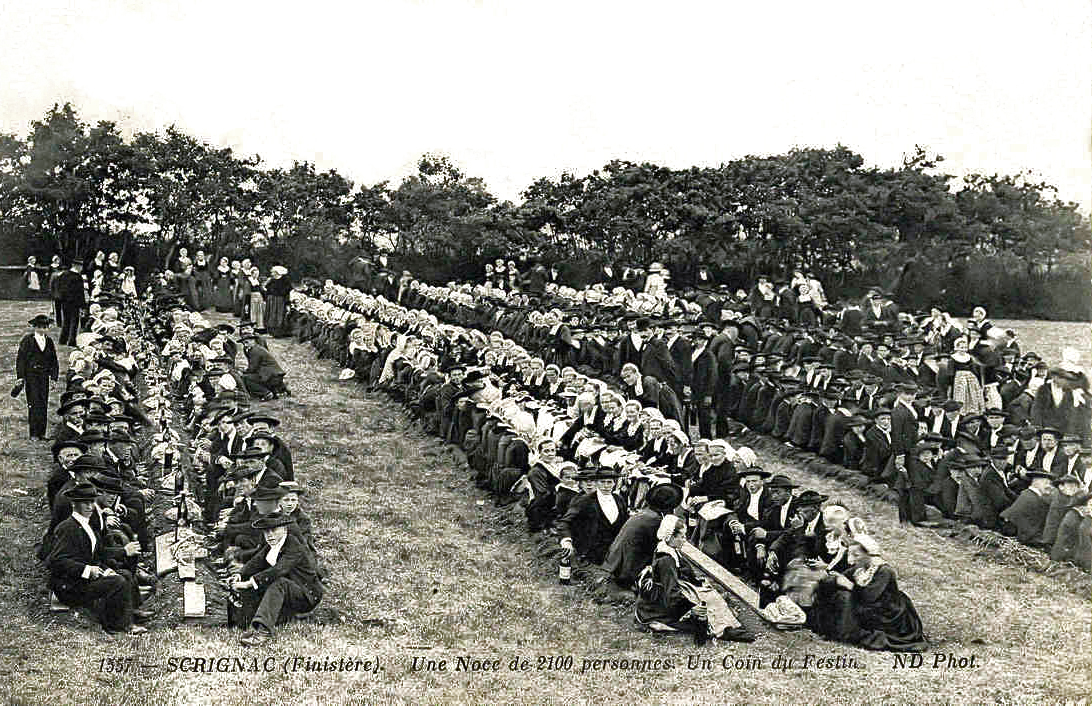
A marriage celebration with 2,100 people at Scrignac in 1912

Historical population

Year	Pop.	±% p.a.
1793	2,016	—
1800	2,048	+0.23%
1806	2,190	+1.12%
1821	2,164	−0.08%
1831	2,586	+1.80%
1836	2,652	+0.51%
1841	2,767	+0.85%
1846	2,891	+0.88%
1851	2,890	−0.01%
1856	2,812	−0.55%
1861	2,947	+0.94%
1866	3,103	+1.04%
1872	3,056	−0.25%
1876	3,130	+0.60%
1881	3,085	−0.29%
1886	3,120	+0.23%
1891	3,140	+0.13%
1896	3,256	+0.73%
1901	3,651	+2.32%

Year	Pop.	±% p.a.
1906	3,825	+0.94%
1911	3,832	+0.04%
1921	3,511	−0.87%
1926	3,386	−0.72%
1931	3,208	−1.07%
1936	2,869	−2.21%
1946	2,558	−1.14%
1954	2,111	−2.37%
1962	1,946	−1.01%
1968	1,687	−2.35%
1975	1,405	−2.58%
1982	1,222	−1.97%
1990	1,005	−2.41%
1999	883	−1.43%
2007	817	−0.97%
2012	805	−0.30%
2017	757	−1.22%
2023	816	+1.26%

Source: EHESS and INSEE (1968-2023)

== See also ==
- Communes of the Finistère department
- Parc naturel régional d'Armorique
