= Plounévézel =

Plounévézel Plonevell
- Commune
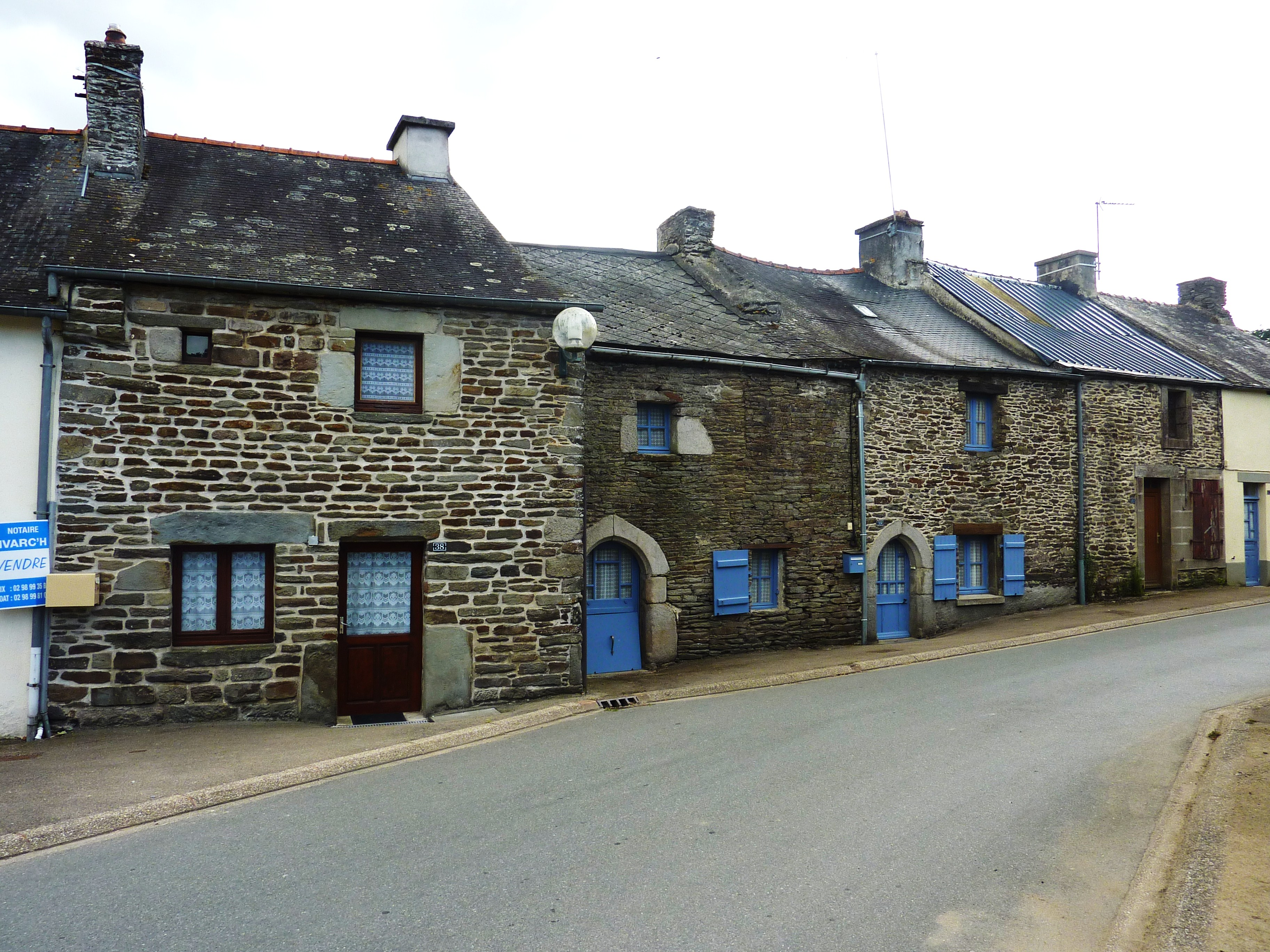
- Old houses of Kergroas

- Coat of arms
- Location of Plounévézel
- Location within France Location within Brittany
- Coordinates: 48°17′41″N 3°35′33″W
- Country: France
- Region: Brittany
- Department: Finistère
- Arrondissement: Châteaulin
- Canton: Carhaix-Plouguer
- Intercommunality: Poher

Government
  - Mayor (2020–2026): Stéphane Cotty
- Area^{1}: 24.42 km^{2} (9.43 sq mi)
- Highest elevation: 181 m (594 ft)
- Lowest elevation: 75 m (246 ft)
- Population (2023): 1,157
  - Density: 47.38/km^{2} (122.7/sq mi)
- Time zone: UTC+01:00 (CET)
  - Summer (DST): UTC+02:00 (CEST)
- INSEE/Postal code: 29205 /29270
- ^{1} French Land Register data, which excludes lakes, ponds, glaciers > 1 km^{2} (0.386 sq mi or 247 acres) and river estuaries.

Plounévézel (French pronunciation: [plunevezɛl]; Breton: Plonevell) is a commune in the Finistère department of Brittany in north-western France.

== Geography ==
Plounévézel is located in the east-central part of the Finistère department, in the historic region of Poher, northwest of Carhaix and southeast of the Monts d'Arrée and the Armorique Regional Natural Park.

The municipal boundaries are limited to the south and east by the Hyères (which separates it from Carhaix and Treffrin ), to the north-east by the Polan mill stream (which further downstream takes the name of Goaz ar Guelen stream), a right-bank tributary of the Hyères, which separates the commune from that of Carnoët (these two watercourses then also serving as a departmental boundary between the departments of Finistère and Côtes-d'Armor ), and to the west by the Dourcan stream, another right-bank tributary of the Hyères; their confluence at an altitude of 80 metres, at the level of the road bridge on the D 764 (former RN 764, now the Lorient-Roscoff axis, which runs along the western boundary of the commune), constitutes the lowest point of the commune, on a gentle slope facing south (the highest point, at an altitude of 164 metres, is located in the far north of the commune with Poullaouen, near Kerviolet. The town, in a relatively central location within the communal territory, is around 120 metres above sea level.

== Population ==
Inhabitants of Plounévézel are called in French Plounévézelois.

Historical population

Year	Pop.	±% p.a.
1793	916	—
1800	958	+0.64%
1806	983	+0.43%
1821	855	−0.93%
1831	975	+1.32%
1836	1,076	+1.99%
1841	1,041	−0.66%
1846	1,070	+0.55%
1851	1,072	+0.04%
1856	1,024	−0.91%
1861	1,030	+0.12%
1866	988	−0.83%
1872	1,039	+0.84%
1876	1,074	+0.83%
1881	1,081	+0.13%
1886	1,111	+0.55%
1891	1,254	+2.45%
1896	1,284	+0.47%
1901	1,299	+0.23%

Year	Pop.	±% p.a.
1906	1,269	−0.47%
1911	1,259	−0.16%
1921	1,298	+0.31%
1926	1,201	−1.54%
1931	1,098	−1.78%
1936	1,018	−1.50%
1946	1,007	−0.11%
1954	845	−2.17%
1962	760	−1.32%
1968	658	−2.37%
1975	714	+1.17%
1982	829	+2.16%
1990	1,017	+2.59%
1999	1,015	−0.02%
2007	1,093	+0.93%
2012	1,204	+1.95%
2017	1,227	+0.38%
2023	1,157	−0.97%

Source: EHESS and INSEE (1968-2023)

== See also ==
- Communes of the Finistère department
