= Brennilis =

Brennilis Brenniliz
- Commune
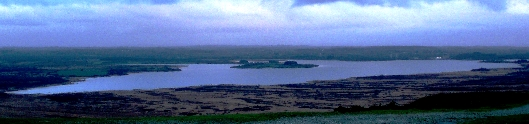
- The Saint-Michel reservoir in Brennilis
- Location of Brennilis
- Location within France Location within Brittany
- Coordinates: 48°21′30″N 3°50′59″W
- Country: France
- Region: Brittany
- Department: Finistère
- Arrondissement: Châteaulin
- Canton: Carhaix-Plouguer
- Intercommunality: Monts d'Arrée Communauté

Government
  - Mayor (2020–2026): Alexis Manac'h
- Area^{1}: 18.69 km^{2} (7.22 sq mi)
- Highest elevation: 278 m (912 ft)
- Lowest elevation: 149 m (489 ft)
- Population (2023): 454
  - Density: 24.3/km^{2} (62.9/sq mi)
- Time zone: UTC+01:00 (CET)
  - Summer (DST): UTC+02:00 (CEST)
- INSEE/Postal code: 29018 /29690
- ^{1} French Land Register data, which excludes lakes, ponds, glaciers > 1 km^{2} (0.386 sq mi or 247 acres) and river estuaries.

Brennilis (French pronunciation: [bʁɛnilis]; Breton: Brenniliz) is a commune in the Finistère department of Brittany in northwestern France.

== Geography ==
=== Climate ===
Brennilis has an oceanic climate (Köppen climate classification Cfb). The average annual temperature in Brennilis is 10.6 °C (51.1 °F). The average annual rainfall is 1,508.2 mm (59.38 in) with January as the wettest month. The temperatures are highest on average in July, at around 16.7 °C (62.1 °F), and lowest in February, at around 5.3 °C (41.5 °F). The highest temperature ever recorded in Brennilis was 36.9 °C (98.4 °F) on 8 August 2003; the coldest temperature ever recorded was −15.0 °C (5.0 °F) on 12 January 1987.

Climate data for Brennilis (1981–2010 averages, extremes 1977−2020)
Month	Jan	Feb	Mar	Apr	May	Jun	Jul	Aug	Sep	Oct	Nov	Dec	Year
Record high °C (°F)	16.0 (60.8)	21.2 (70.2)	23.0 (73.4)	28.0 (82.4)	31.0 (87.8)	35.0 (95.0)	34.5 (94.1)	36.9 (98.4)	31.0 (87.8)	28.7 (83.7)	20.6 (69.1)	17.0 (62.6)	36.9 (98.4)
Mean daily maximum °C (°F)	8.3 (46.9)	8.6 (47.5)	11.0 (51.8)	13.1 (55.6)	16.5 (61.7)	19.5 (67.1)	21.3 (70.3)	21.3 (70.3)	19.2 (66.6)	15.1 (59.2)	11.3 (52.3)	8.8 (47.8)	14.5 (58.1)
Daily mean °C (°F)	5.4 (41.7)	5.3 (41.5)	7.3 (45.1)	8.8 (47.8)	12.1 (53.8)	14.9 (58.8)	16.7 (62.1)	16.6 (61.9)	14.6 (58.3)	11.5 (52.7)	8.2 (46.8)	5.9 (42.6)	10.6 (51.1)
Mean daily minimum °C (°F)	2.5 (36.5)	2.1 (35.8)	3.6 (38.5)	4.5 (40.1)	7.8 (46.0)	10.2 (50.4)	12.2 (54.0)	12.0 (53.6)	10.1 (50.2)	7.9 (46.2)	5.1 (41.2)	3.0 (37.4)	6.8 (44.2)
Record low °C (°F)	−15.0 (5.0)	−11.0 (12.2)	−6.4 (20.5)	−4.0 (24.8)	−2.0 (28.4)	2.0 (35.6)	5.0 (41.0)	2.0 (35.6)	2.5 (36.5)	−3.0 (26.6)	−5.0 (23.0)	−8.0 (17.6)	−15.0 (5.0)
Average precipitation mm (inches)	191.4 (7.54)	143.0 (5.63)	124.7 (4.91)	108.2 (4.26)	99.9 (3.93)	71.3 (2.81)	79.2 (3.12)	82.1 (3.23)	104.7 (4.12)	156.5 (6.16)	160.5 (6.32)	186.7 (7.35)	1,508.2 (59.38)
Average precipitation days (≥ 1.0 mm)	18.5	14.8	15.4	13.5	12.2	9.7	11.0	10.3	11.4	15.9	17.6	17.9	168.2
Source: Meteociel

== Population ==
Historical population
Year	Pop.	±% p.a.
1968	760	—
1975	654	−2.12%
1982	573	−1.87%
1990	439	−3.28%
1999	467	+0.69%
2007	437	−0.83%
2012	461	+1.08%
2017	444	−0.75%
2023	454	+0.37%
Source: INSEE

Inhabitants of Brennilis are called Brennilisiens in French.

== See also ==
- Communes of the Finistère department
- Brennilis Nuclear Power Plant
- Parc naturel régional d'Armorique
- Roland Doré sculptor
