= Jardin botanique des Montagnes Noires =

Botanical garden in Le Fell, Spezet, Finistère, Brittany, France

Coordinates: 48.1757°N 3.7274°W

The Jardin botanique des Montagnes Noires (Breton: Liorzh louzawouriezh ar Menezioù Du) (6 hectares) is a botanical garden specializing in conifers, located in Le Fell, Spezet, Finistère, Brittany, France. It is open daily; an admission fee is charged.

The garden was established in 1995 and dedicated primarily to conifers. It currently contains about 700 species in total, including 500 conifer taxa as well as bamboos, camellias, heather, magnolias, rhododendrons, and roses.

You can follow the informations of the botanical garden on its Facebook (https://www.facebook.com/people/Jardin-Botanique-des-Montagnes-Noires/61550715063839) in waiting that the new website which will offer an English version (in more of the French and Breton version).

== See also ==
- List of botanical gardens in France
