= Plonévez-du-Faou =

Plonévez-du-Faou Plonevez-ar-Faou
- Commune
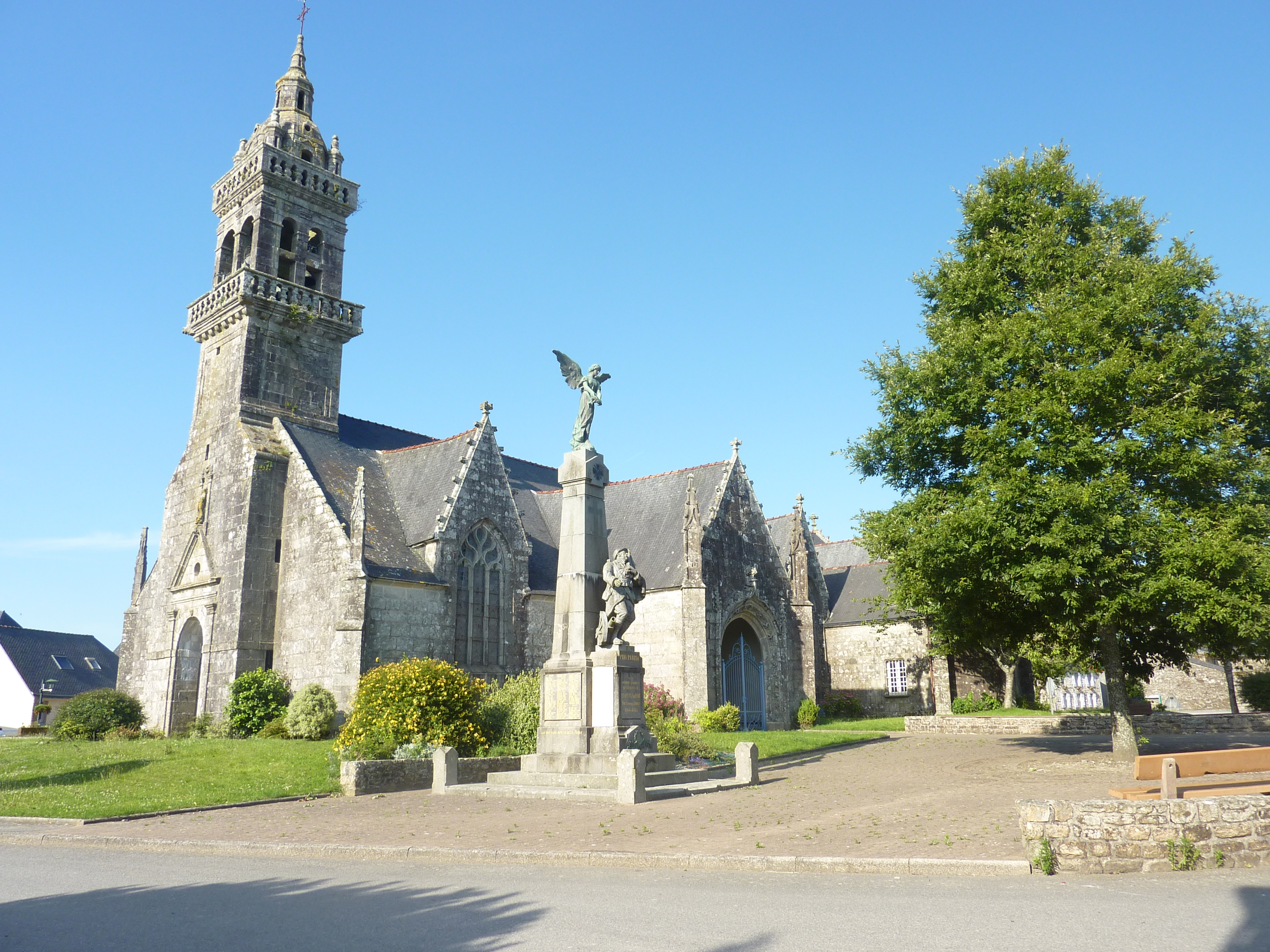
- The parish church in Plonévez-du-Faou

- Coat of arms
- Location of Plonévez-du-Faou
- Location within France Location within Brittany
- Coordinates: 48°15′15″N 3°49′26″W
- Country: France
- Region: Brittany
- Department: Finistère
- Arrondissement: Châteaulin
- Canton: Carhaix-Plouguer
- Intercommunality: Haute Cornouaille

Government
  - Mayor (2020–2026): Marguerite Bleuzen
- Area^{1}: 80.73 km^{2} (31.17 sq mi)
- Highest elevation: 275 m (902 ft)
- Lowest elevation: 50 m (160 ft)
- Population (2023): 2,160
  - Density: 26.8/km^{2} (69.3/sq mi)
- Time zone: UTC+01:00 (CET)
  - Summer (DST): UTC+02:00 (CEST)
- INSEE/Postal code: 29175 /29530
- ^{1} French Land Register data, which excludes lakes, ponds, glaciers > 1 km^{2} (0.386 sq mi or 247 acres) and river estuaries.

Plonévez-du-Faou (Breton: Plonevez-ar-Faou) is a commune in the Finistère department of Brittany in north-western France.

== Geography ==
=== Climate ===
Plonévez-du-Faou has an oceanic climate (Köppen climate classification Cfb). The average annual temperature in Plonévez-du-Faou is 11.7 °C (53.1 °F). The average annual rainfall is 1,143.7 mm (45.03 in) with December as the wettest month. The temperatures are highest on average in August, at around 17.8 °C (64.0 °F), and lowest in January, at around 6.4 °C (43.5 °F). The highest temperature ever recorded in Plonévez-du-Faou was 38.7 °C (101.7 °F) on 9 August 2003; the coldest temperature ever recorded was −10.0 °C (14.0 °F) on 2 January 1997.

Climate data for Plonévez-du-Faou (1981–2010 averages, extremes 1988−2017)
Month	Jan	Feb	Mar	Apr	May	Jun	Jul	Aug	Sep	Oct	Nov	Dec	Year
Record high °C (°F)	17.0 (62.6)	18.6 (65.5)	25.0 (77.0)	30.0 (86.0)	31.2 (88.2)	34.5 (94.1)	37.3 (99.1)	38.7 (101.7)	32.5 (90.5)	29.0 (84.2)	21.7 (71.1)	17.5 (63.5)	38.7 (101.7)
Mean daily maximum °C (°F)	8.9 (48.0)	10.0 (50.0)	12.4 (54.3)	14.2 (57.6)	18.3 (64.9)	21.0 (69.8)	22.4 (72.3)	23.0 (73.4)	20.4 (68.7)	16.3 (61.3)	12.1 (53.8)	9.2 (48.6)	15.7 (60.3)
Daily mean °C (°F)	6.4 (43.5)	6.8 (44.2)	8.6 (47.5)	9.9 (49.8)	13.5 (56.3)	15.9 (60.6)	17.5 (63.5)	17.8 (64.0)	15.6 (60.1)	12.7 (54.9)	9.0 (48.2)	6.5 (43.7)	11.7 (53.1)
Mean daily minimum °C (°F)	3.8 (38.8)	3.7 (38.7)	4.8 (40.6)	5.5 (41.9)	8.7 (47.7)	10.8 (51.4)	12.6 (54.7)	12.6 (54.7)	10.7 (51.3)	9.0 (48.2)	5.9 (42.6)	3.9 (39.0)	7.7 (45.9)
Record low °C (°F)	−10.0 (14.0)	−8.5 (16.7)	−5.5 (22.1)	−2.5 (27.5)	−0.5 (31.1)	3.2 (37.8)	5.7 (42.3)	4.5 (40.1)	3.0 (37.4)	−2.2 (28.0)	−5.3 (22.5)	−8.0 (17.6)	−10.0 (14.0)
Average precipitation mm (inches)	132.1 (5.20)	101.9 (4.01)	94.1 (3.70)	82.6 (3.25)	80.8 (3.18)	56.3 (2.22)	64.2 (2.53)	68.7 (2.70)	81.2 (3.20)	121.0 (4.76)	125.0 (4.92)	135.8 (5.35)	1,143.7 (45.03)
Average precipitation days (≥ 1.0 mm)	17.2	13.5	14.1	13.0	11.9	8.9	9.9	9.2	10.7	15.5	16.6	16.5	157.1
Source: Meteociel

== Population ==
Inhabitants of Plonévez-du-Faou are called in French Plonévéziens.

Historical population

Year	Pop.	±% p.a.
1793	2,750	—
1800	2,441	−1.69%
1806	2,788	+2.24%
1821	3,160	+0.84%
1831	3,532	+1.12%
1836	3,802	+1.48%
1841	3,703	−0.53%
1846	3,747	+0.24%
1851	3,688	−0.32%
1856	3,589	−0.54%
1861	4,416	+4.23%
1866	4,047	−1.73%
1872	3,571	−2.06%
1876	3,962	+2.63%
1881	4,142	+0.89%
1886	4,242	+0.48%
1891	4,485	+1.12%
1896	4,765	+1.22%
1901	4,825	+0.25%

Year	Pop.	±% p.a.
1906	4,964	+0.57%
1911	5,188	+0.89%
1921	5,193	+0.01%
1926	5,138	−0.21%
1931	4,568	−2.32%
1936	4,247	−1.45%
1946	4,041	−0.50%
1954	3,524	−1.70%
1962	3,319	−0.75%
1968	3,063	−1.33%
1975	2,733	−1.62%
1982	2,515	−1.18%
1990	2,257	−1.34%
1999	2,206	−0.25%
2007	2,096	−0.64%
2012	2,153	+0.54%
2017	2,105	−0.45%
2023	2,160	+0.43%

Source: EHESS and INSEE (1968-2023)

== See also ==
- Communes of the Finistère department
- Calvary at Saint-Herbot near Plonévez-du-Faou and the Chapelle Saint-Herbot.
- List of works of the two Folgoët ateliers
