= Cléden-Poher =

Cléden-Poher Kledenn-Poc'hêr
- Commune
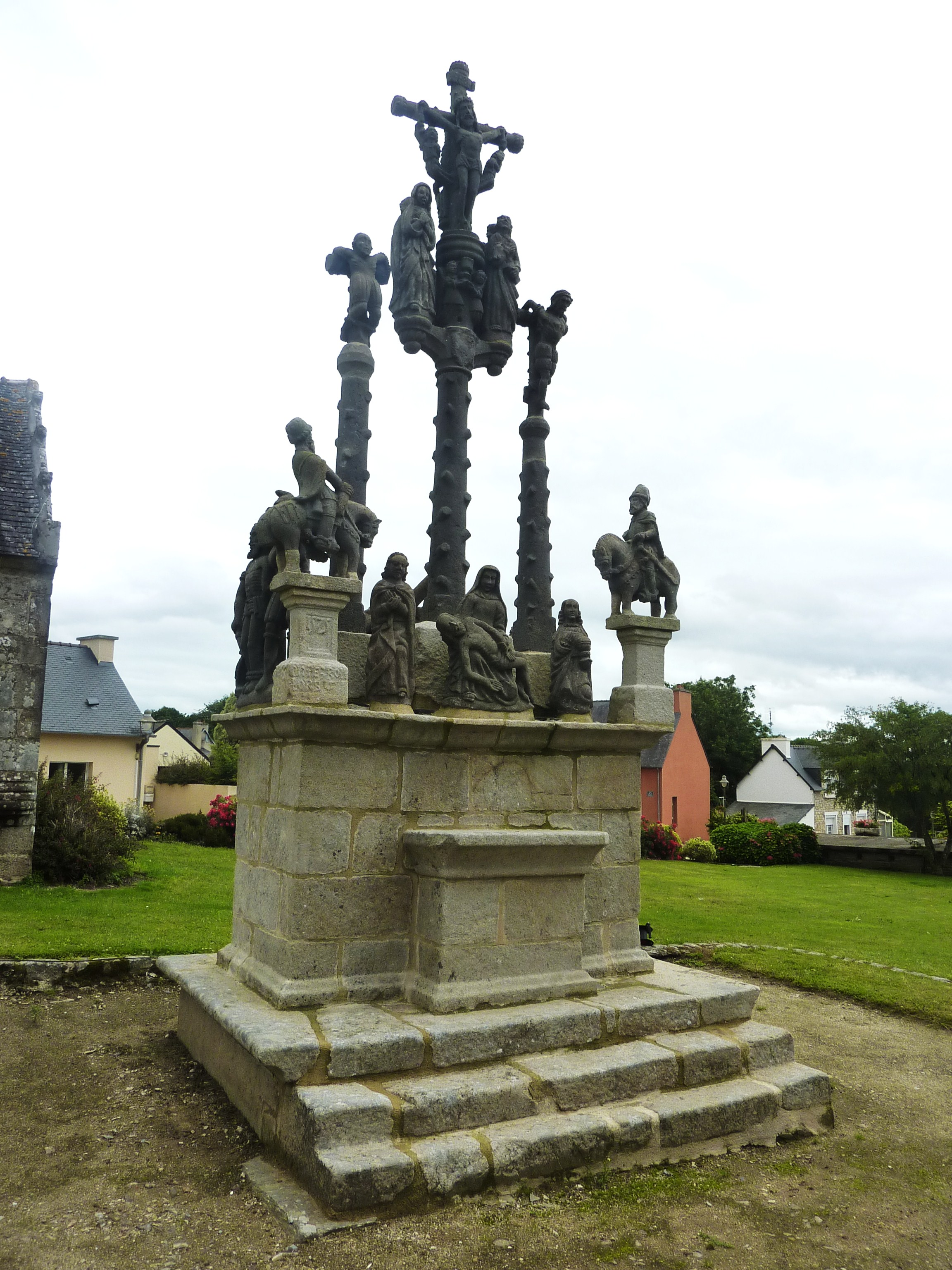
- The calvary in Cléden-Poher
- Location of Cléden-Poher
- Location within France Location within Brittany
- Coordinates: 48°14′11″N 3°40′02″W
- Country: France
- Region: Brittany
- Department: Finistère
- Arrondissement: Châteaulin
- Canton: Carhaix-Plouguer
- Intercommunality: Poher

Government
  - Mayor (2020–2026): Jacques Quiltu
- Area^{1}: 29.81 km^{2} (11.51 sq mi)
- Highest elevation: 155 m (509 ft)
- Lowest elevation: 53 m (174 ft)
- Population (2023): 1,130
  - Density: 37.9/km^{2} (98.2/sq mi)
- Time zone: UTC+01:00 (CET)
  - Summer (DST): UTC+02:00 (CEST)
- INSEE/Postal code: 29029 /29270
- ^{1} French Land Register data, which excludes lakes, ponds, glaciers > 1 km^{2} (0.386 sq mi or 247 acres) and river estuaries.

Cléden-Poher (French pronunciation: [kledɛ̃ pɔɛʁ]; Breton: Kledenn-Poc'hêr) is a commune in the Finistère department of Brittany in north-western France.

== Population ==
Historical population
Year	Pop.	±% p.a.
1968	1,064	—
1975	1,011	−0.73%
1982	1,118	+1.45%
1990	1,130	+0.13%
1999	1,047	−0.84%
2007	1,046	−0.01%
2012	1,109	+1.18%
2017	1,158	+0.87%
2023	1,130	−0.41%
Source: INSEE

Inhabitants of Cléden-Poher are called in French Clédinois.

== Map ==
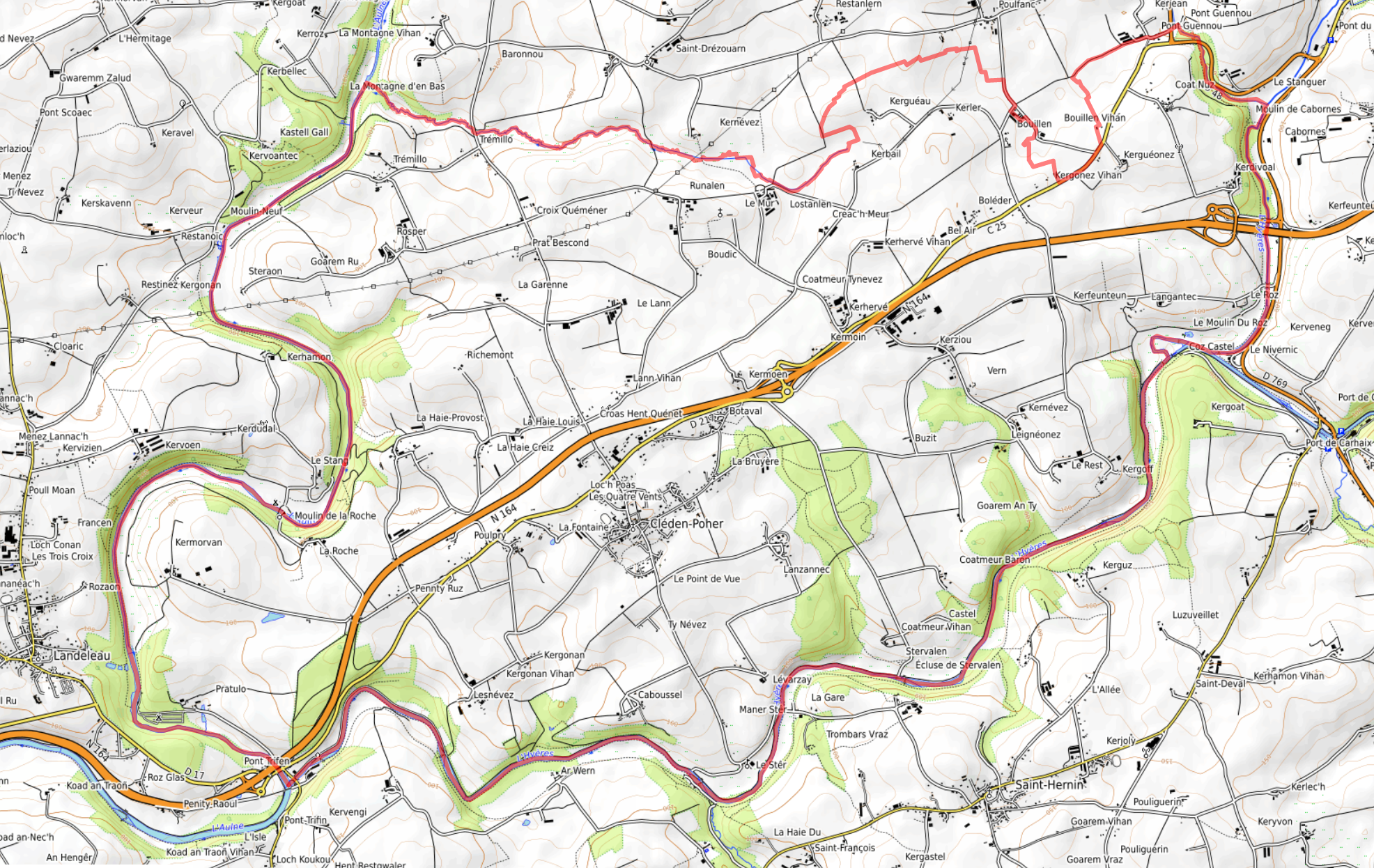
Topographic map

== See also ==
- Communes of the Finistère department
