= Saint-Rivoal =

Saint-Rivoal Sant-Riwal
- Commune
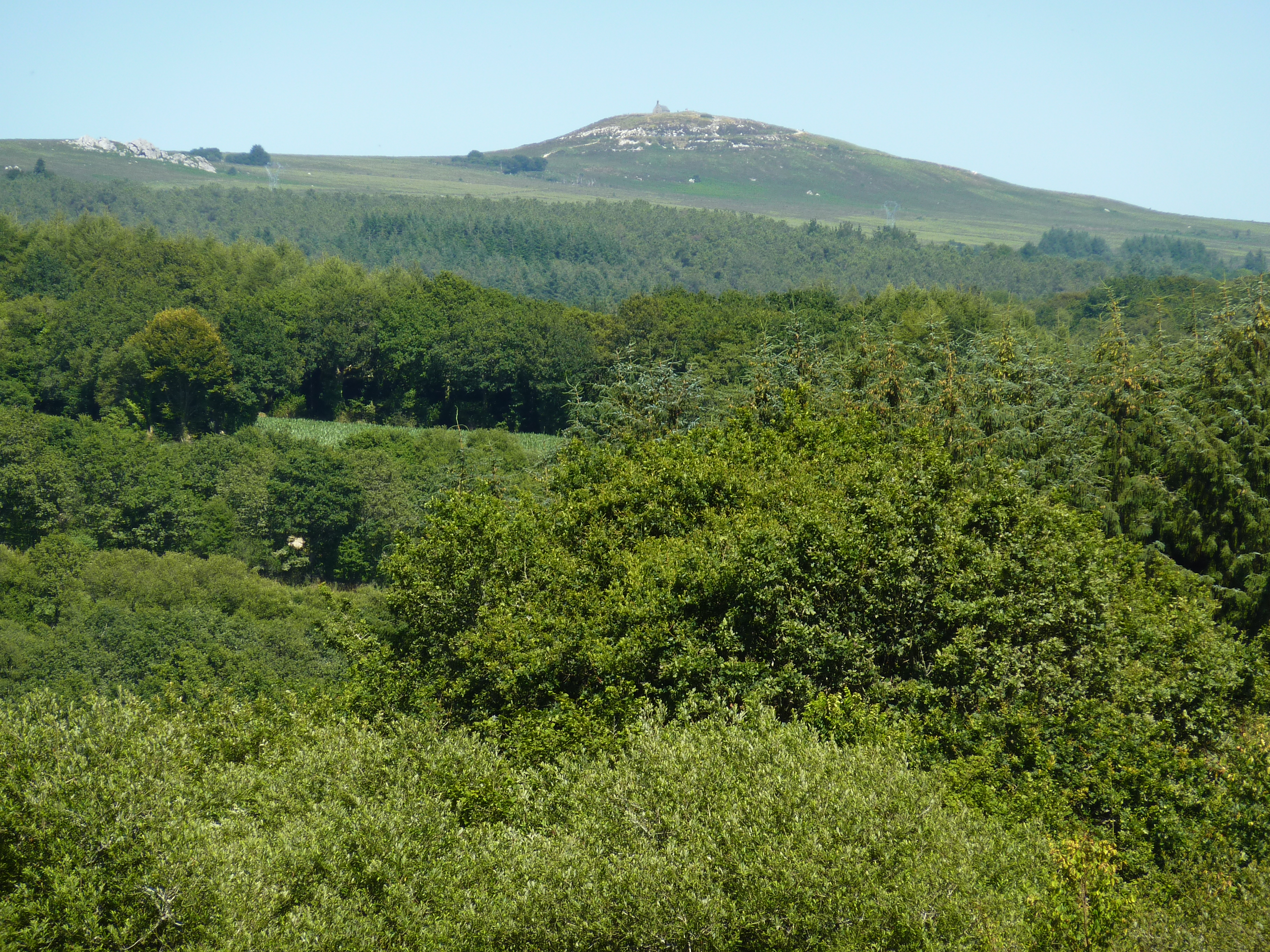
- Mont Saint-Michel-de-Brasparts, seen from Glujeau Ty Riou to the west
- Location of Saint-Rivoal
- Location within France Location within Brittany
- Coordinates: 48°20′59″N 3°59′40″W
- Country: France
- Region: Brittany
- Department: Finistère
- Arrondissement: Châteaulin
- Canton: Carhaix-Plouguer
- Intercommunality: Monts d'Arrée Communauté

Government
  - Mayor (2020–2026): Mickaël Toullec
- Area^{1}: 18.69 km^{2} (7.22 sq mi)
- Highest elevation: 381 m (1,250 ft)
- Lowest elevation: 110 m (360 ft)
- Population (2023): 223
  - Density: 11.9/km^{2} (30.9/sq mi)
- Time zone: UTC+01:00 (CET)
  - Summer (DST): UTC+02:00 (CEST)
- INSEE/Postal code: 29261 /29190
- ^{1} French Land Register data, which excludes lakes, ponds, glaciers > 1 km^{2} (0.386 sq mi or 247 acres) and river estuaries.

Saint-Rivoal (French pronunciation: [sɛ̃ ʁivwal]; Breton: Sant-Riwal) is a commune in the Finistère department of Brittany in north-western France.

== Population ==
Historical population
Year	Pop.	±% p.a.
1968	257	—
1975	225	−1.88%
1982	208	−1.12%
1990	172	−2.35%
1999	164	−0.53%
2007	172	+0.60%
2012	170	−0.23%
2017	194	+2.68%
2023	223	+2.35%
Source: INSEE

Inhabitants of Saint-Rivoal are called in French Saint-Rivoaliens.

== Breton language ==
As of 2010 and previous years, all primary-school children (numbering about 30), attended the bilingual public school, where Breton language is taught alongside French.

== See also ==
- Communes of the Finistère department
- Parc naturel régional d'Armorique
