= Landeleau =

Landeleau Landelo
- Commune
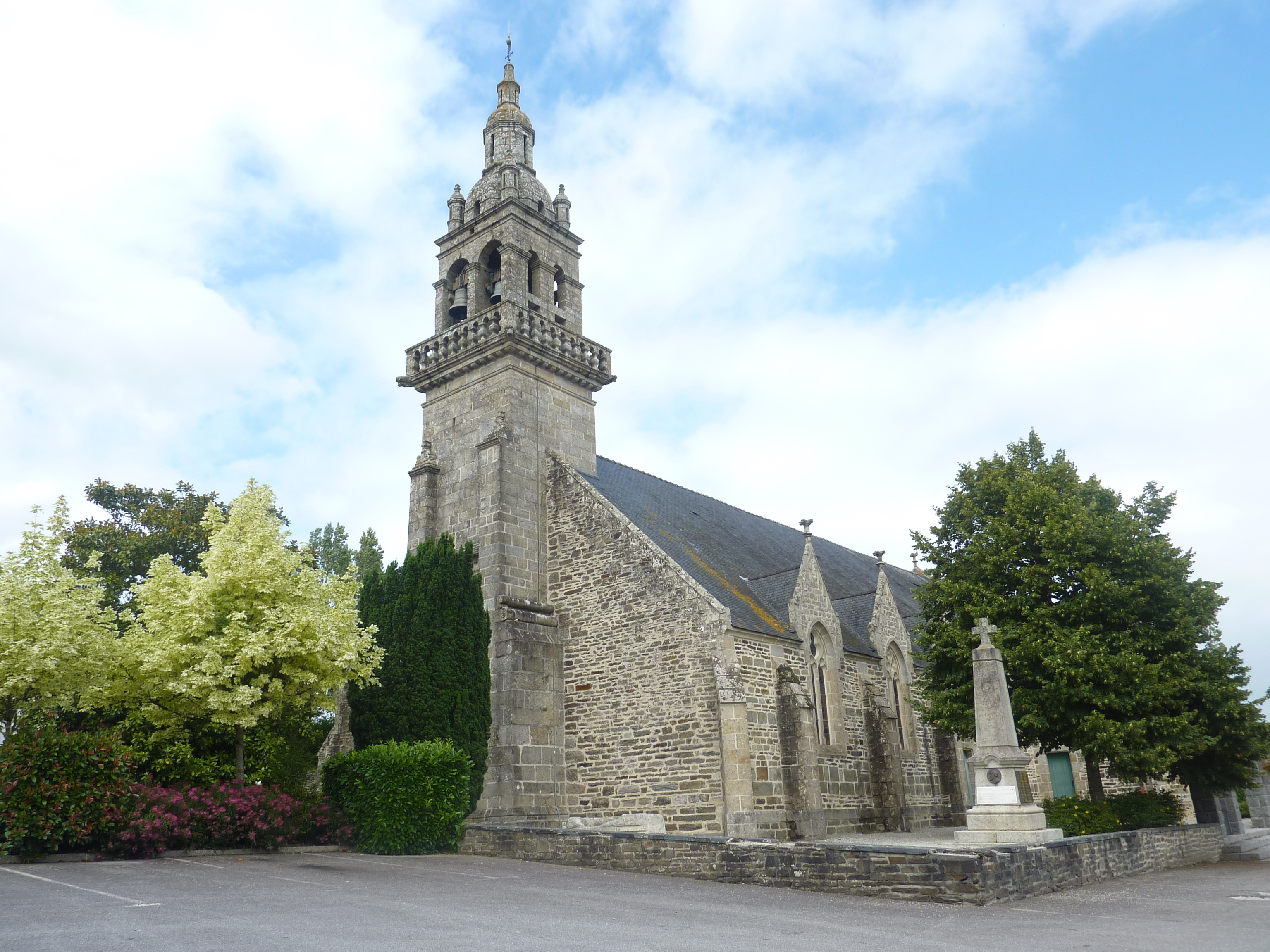
- The parish church of Saint-Thélo and the war memorial
- Location of Landeleau
- Location within France Location within Brittany
- Coordinates: 48°13′44″N 3°43′38″W
- Country: France
- Region: Brittany
- Department: Finistère
- Arrondissement: Châteaulin
- Canton: Carhaix-Plouguer
- Intercommunality: Haute Cornouaille

Government
  - Mayor (2020–2026): Yvon Coquil
- Area^{1}: 30.41 km^{2} (11.74 sq mi)
- Highest elevation: 183 m (600 ft)
- Lowest elevation: 51 m (167 ft)
- Population (2023): 993
  - Density: 32.7/km^{2} (84.6/sq mi)
- Time zone: UTC+01:00 (CET)
  - Summer (DST): UTC+02:00 (CEST)
- INSEE/Postal code: 29102 /29530
- ^{1} French Land Register data, which excludes lakes, ponds, glaciers > 1 km^{2} (0.386 sq mi or 247 acres) and river estuaries.

Landeleau (French pronunciation: [lɑ̃dlo]; Breton: Landelo) is a commune in the Finistère department of Brittany in north-western France.

== Population ==
Historical population
Year	Pop.	±% p.a.
1968	1,250	—
1975	1,148	−1.21%
1982	1,088	−0.76%
1990	1,028	−0.71%
1999	1,042	+0.15%
2007	1,036	−0.07%
2012	983	−1.04%
2017	937	−0.95%
2023	993	+0.97%
Source: INSEE

Inhabitants of Landeleau are called in French Landeleausiens.

== Map ==
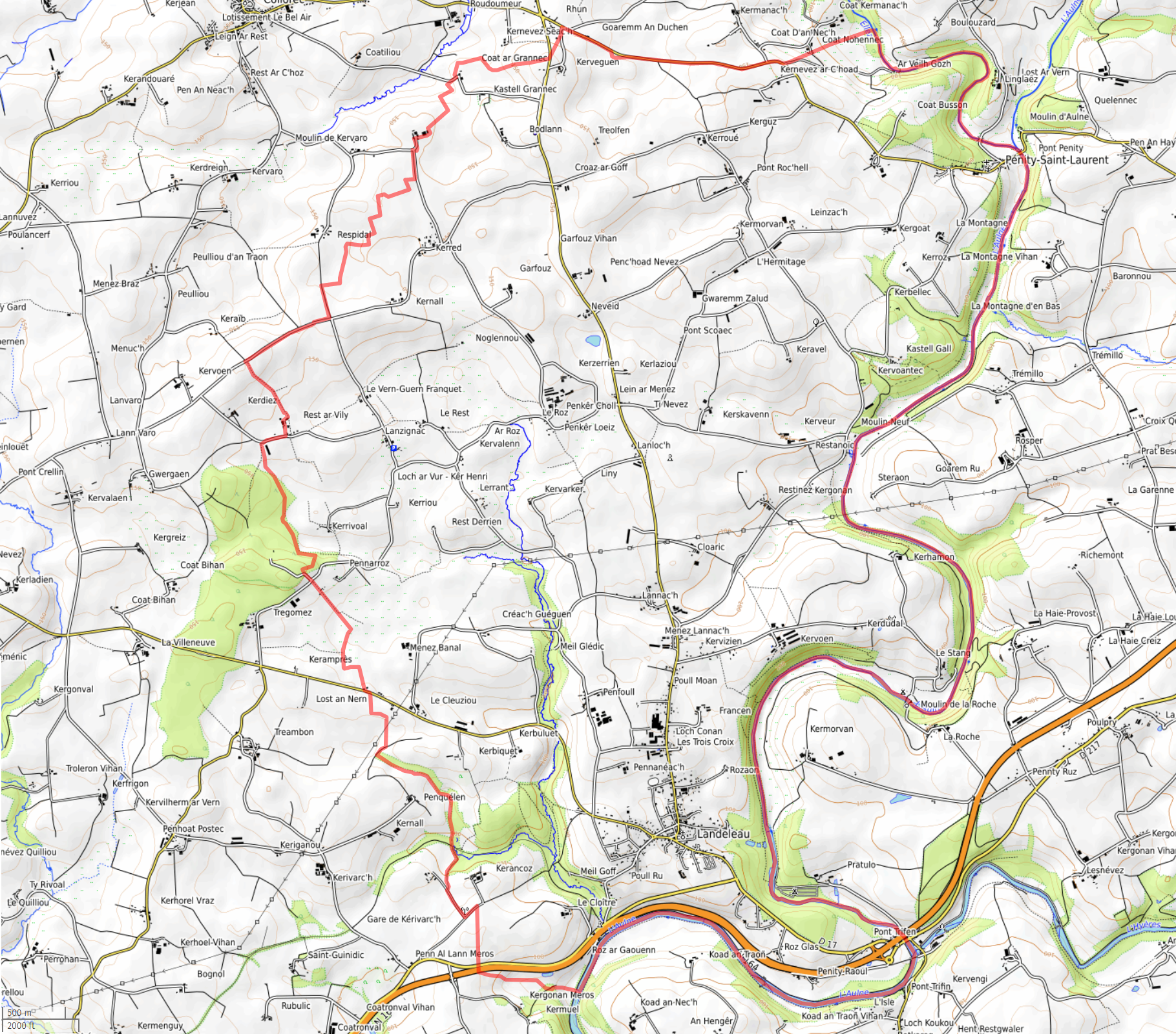
Topographic map.

== See also ==
- Communes of the Finistère department
