= Berrien, Finistère =

Berrien Berrien
- Commune
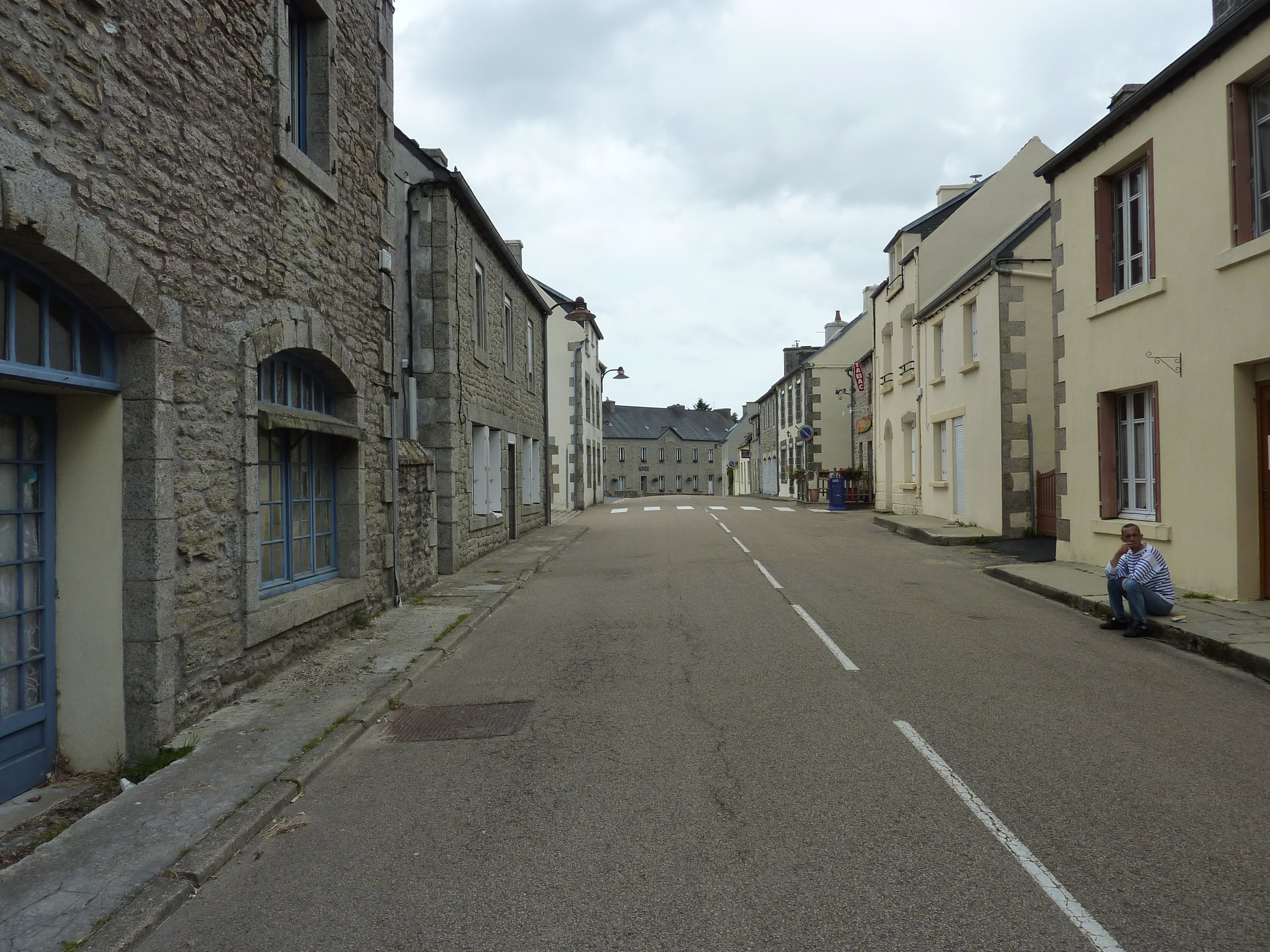
- The main road in the village

- Coat of arms
- Location of Berrien
- Location within France Location within Brittany
- Coordinates: 48°24′18″N 3°45′02″W
- Country: France
- Region: Brittany
- Department: Finistère
- Arrondissement: Châteaulin
- Canton: Carhaix-Plouguer
- Intercommunality: Monts d'Arrée

Government
  - Mayor (2020–2026): Hubert Le Lann
- Area^{1}: 56.42 km^{2} (21.78 sq mi)
- Highest elevation: 355 m (1,165 ft)
- Lowest elevation: 92 m (302 ft)
- Population (2023): 943
  - Density: 16.7/km^{2} (43.3/sq mi)
- Time zone: UTC+01:00 (CET)
  - Summer (DST): UTC+02:00 (CEST)
- INSEE/Postal code: 29007 /29690
- ^{1} French Land Register data, which excludes lakes, ponds, glaciers > 1 km^{2} (0.386 sq mi or 247 acres) and river estuaries.

Berrien (French pronunciation: [bɛʁjɛ̃]; Breton: Berrien) is a commune in the Finistère department of Brittany in north-western France.

== Population ==
Historical population
Year	Pop.	±% p.a.
1968	1,179	—
1975	1,069	−1.39%
1982	1,018	−0.70%
1990	1,005	−0.16%
1999	940	−0.74%
2007	953	+0.17%
2012	967	+0.29%
2017	919	−1.01%
2023	943	+0.43%
Source: INSEE

Inhabitants of Berrien are called Berriennois in French.

== See also ==
- Communes of the Finistère department
- Parc naturel régional d'Armorique
