= Canton of Carhaix-Plouguer =

Coordinates: 48.28°N 3.57°W

The canton of Carhaix-Plouguer is an administrative division of the Finistère department, northwestern France. Its borders were modified at the French canton reorganisation which came into effect in March 2015. Its seat is in Carhaix-Plouguer.

It consists of the following communes:

1. Berrien
2. Bolazec
3. Botmeur
4. Brasparts
5. Brennilis
6. Carhaix-Plouguer
7. Cléden-Poher
8. Collorec
9. La Feuillée
10. Huelgoat
11. Kergloff
12. Landeleau
13. Lopérec
14. Loqueffret
15. Motreff
16. Plonévez-du-Faou
17. Plounévézel
18. Plouyé
19. Poullaouen
20. Saint-Hernin
21. Saint-Rivoal
22. Scrignac
23. Spézet
