= Edern =

Edern may refer to Saint Edern or to:

- Edern, Carinthia, Austria
- Edern, Finistère, France
- Edern, Gwynedd, Wales

== See also ==
- Edern ap Nudd, Arthurian knight and also called "St Edern"
- name : Jean-Edern Hallier
