= Charles Belle =

French painter

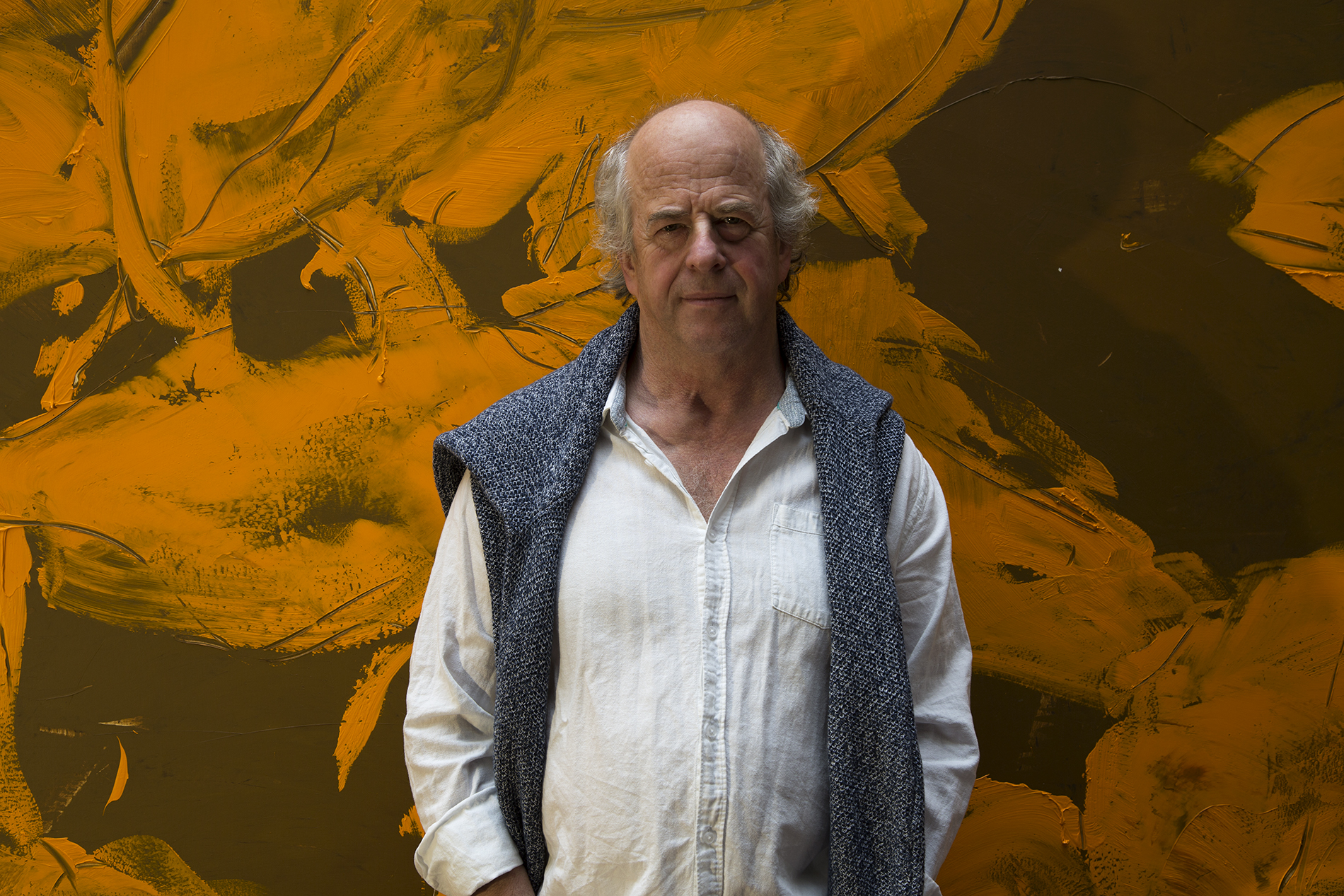
- Charles Belle
- Born: April 15, 1956 (age 70); Rochejean
- Occupation: Painter

Charles Belle is a French painter. He is known for his outspoken paintings.

== Biography ==
Belle was born on April 15, 1956, in Rochejean. He studied at the Tunis Institute of Fine Arts and obtained his DNSEP, a high-level art education diploma in 1979. He started hi career as a photographer. Charles Belle's works has been exhibited at many contemporary art fairs such as Art Basel, Art Basel-Miami, Foire Internationale d'Art Contemporain, Art Brussels, Art Paris, and are regularly exhibited in Paris, Switzerland, New York, Seoul and Beirut.

== Selected exhibitions ==
=== Solo ===
- 2021: Regard d’Artiste, Château de Trévarez, Saint-Goazec, France
- 2017: Sens figurés, Contemporary Art Center, Nanterre, France
- 2009: arbres divers, La Cohue - Vannes Museum of Fine Arts, Vannes, France
- 2009: ce doux chemin silencieux, La Cohue - Vannes Museum of Fine Arts, Vannes, France
- 2003: Art Paris, Denise Cadé Gallery, New York, USA
- 2000: FIAC, Paris, France
- 1996: CRAC Alsace, Alsace, France

=== Group ===
- 2022: Destins de Cirque, Royal Saltworks at Arc-et-Senans, Doubs, France
- 2016: Gallery of the imaginary, Lascaux International Center of Parietal Art, Lascaux, Montignac, France
- 2013:Il était une forêt, by Luc Jacquet, Parc André Citroën, Paris, France
- 2006: Art Basel Miami Beach, Miami, USA
- 2000: Art Brussels, Brussels, Belgium
- From 1994 to 2000: Traveling Exhibition of Contemporary Art as part of the UNESCO Slave Route Project
