= Lannédern Parish close =

Coordinates: 48.3026°N 3.8945°W

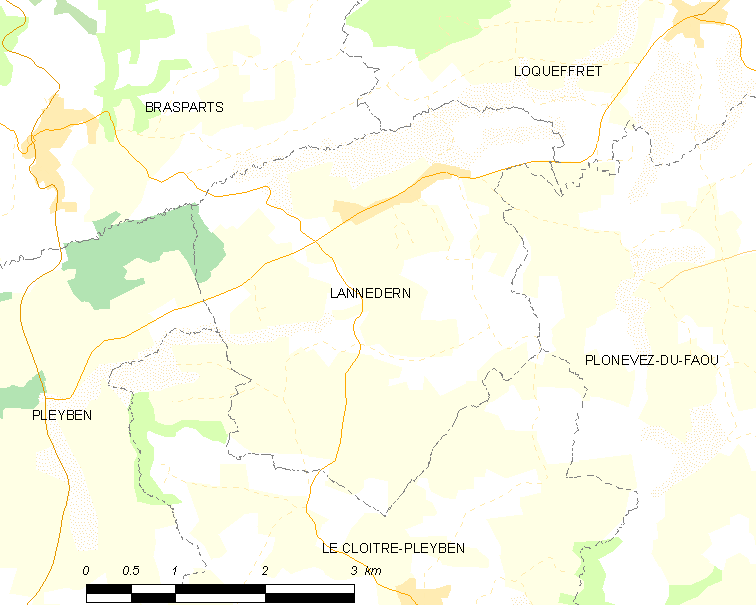
Map showing location Lannédern

The Lannédern Parish close (Enclos paroissial) is located at Lannédern in the Châteaulin arrondissement within Brittany in north-western France. The parish close comprises the parish church of Saint-Edern dating to the 16th/17th century and the Saint Anne chapel, originally an ossuary. The church's south porch dates to 1662, the pulpit is 17th century as is the altar and altarpiece. The ossuary stands to the west of the church. The church, calvary and ossuary are listed historical monuments since 1915.

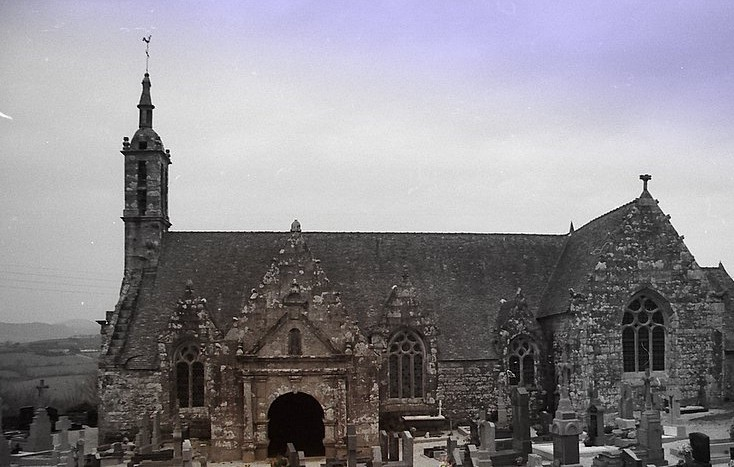
The church at Lannédern

== The ossuary ==
This building dates to between 1660 and 1662 and became the chapel of Saint-Anne in 1668. It also served as a library. Above the ossuary windows and door are carvings depicting the heads of angels alternating with skulls and bones and on the building's gables are two angels holding banners which declare " COGITA . MORI — RESPICE . FINEM". Inside the ossuary/chapel, furnishings include a statue of Saint Anne.

== The calvary ==
This calvary dates to the 16th/17th-century. On the shaft of the crucifixion cross there is a sculpture depicting Saint Edern riding a deer. Apart from Jesus and the two robbers, the calvary also includes an 'Ecce-Homo' composition and back to back (adossées) depictions of the Virgin Mary and Saint Peter and John the Evangelist and Mary Magdalene.

== Furnishings ==
The church holds Saint Edern's tomb (gisant) and a statue of Saint Edern riding his deer. The church holds a bronze stoup dating to 1578. Over the porch there is a statue of Jesus Christ holding a globe with the Virgin Mary on one side and John the Evangelist on the other.

== Saint Edern ==
Legend states that he was originally from Great Britain, probably Wales, and was a companion of King Arthur before becoming a recluse in Armonica, an area in Brittany. He lived as a hermit and the parish church was built where he was said to be buried.

== Miscellaneous ==
- The church has an elaborate wooden chest serving as a reliquary. It is meant to represent a house and at each corner of the chest is a buttress with a statue of Saint Peter, Saint Paul, Saint Andrew and John the Evangelist. It is reckoned to be one of the oldest reliquaries in Brittany.
- In the church are six bas-relief panels, previously held in the ossuary, these depicting scenes from the life of Saint Edern.
- The main stained glass window originally held twelve panels. Seven have survived. In one we see Saint Edern riding a deer, in another Jesus carrying the cross, then Jesus washing the disciples' feet, Jesus taken before Pontius Pilate, Judas' kiss of betrayal, a pietà and the entry into Jerusalem and in the remaining lancette are depictions of Saint Edern and Saint Veronica.
- In the church there is a painting of the Virgin Mary handing a rosary to Saint Dominic and Saint Catherine of Sienne. It is signed by Y Quintin and dated 1660. This artist came from Saint-Pol-de-Léon and his work can be seen in Brasparts, Bodilis, Saint-Pol-de-Léon and Saint-Thégonnec.
- The church's master altar, with a painting depicting the pascal lamb, dates to the 19th-century and has a reredos which dates to the 17th-century. The altar's tabernacle is decorated with a "Christ in Majesty" and has two niches containing statuettes of Saint Peter and Saint Paul.
- The church has a 'poutre de gloire' with depictions of Jesus, the Virgin Mary and John the Evangelist, this on a highly decorated rood beam.

== Gallery of images ==
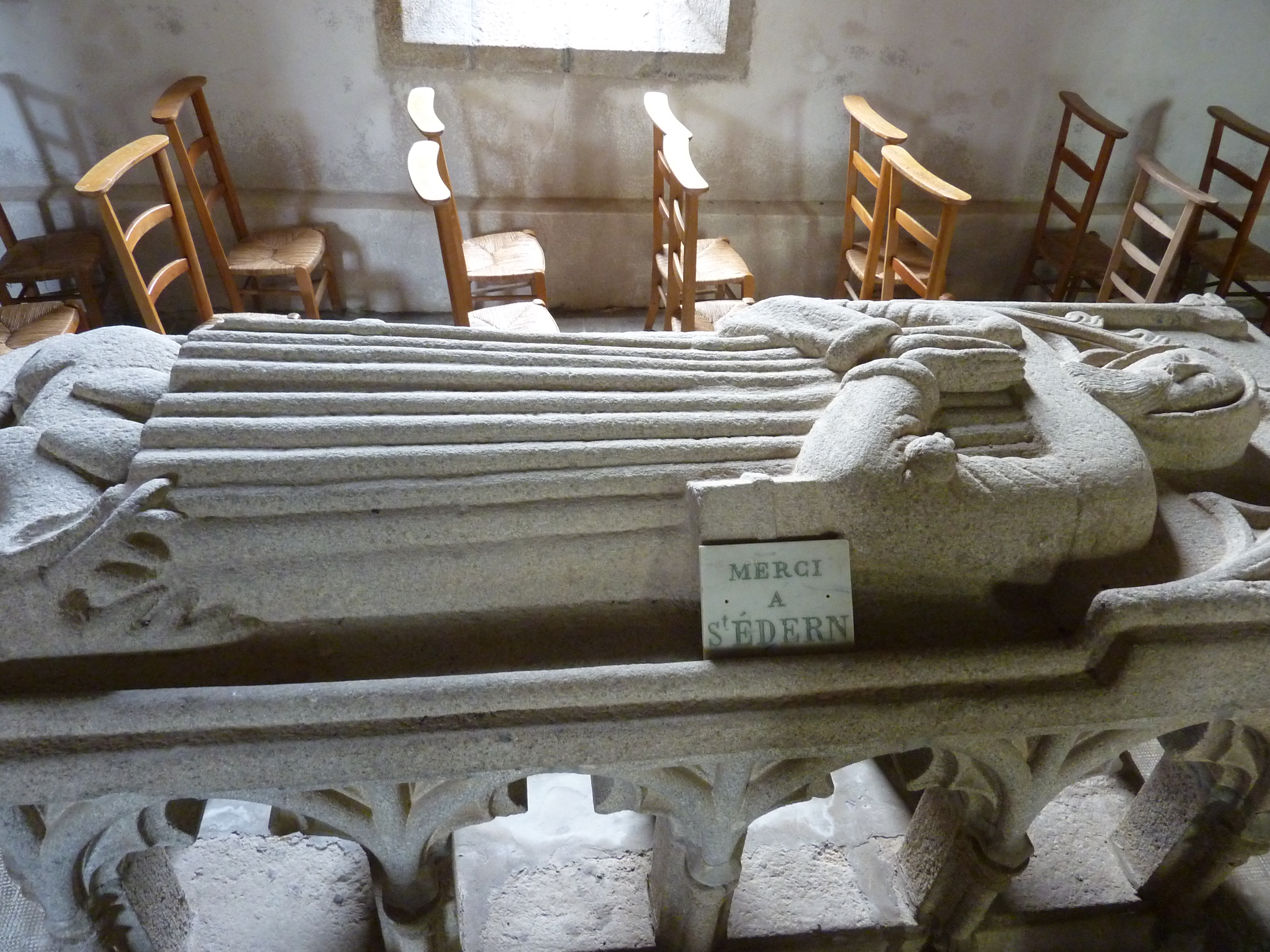
Gisant of Saint Edern in the nave of the church

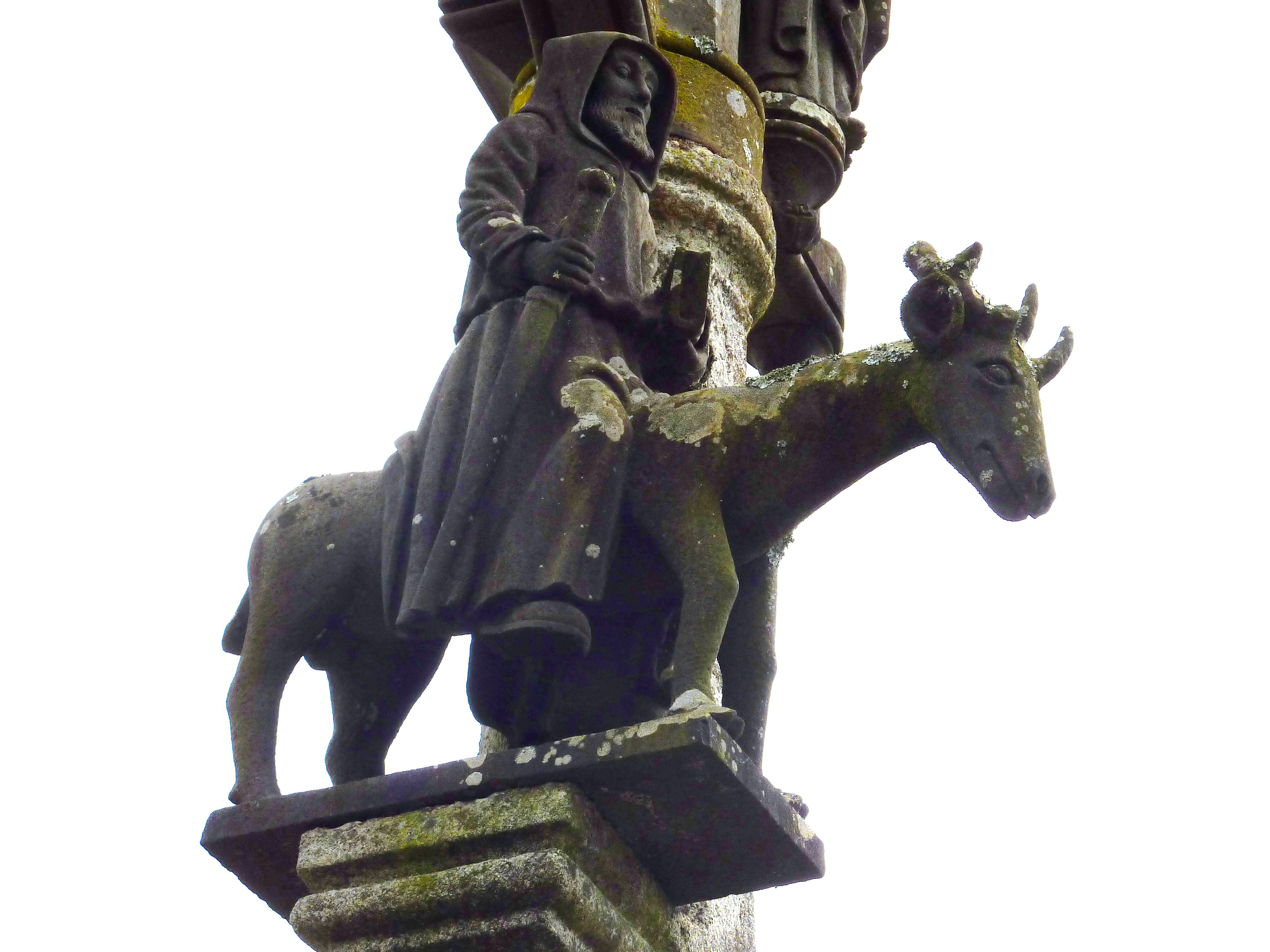
Saint Edern rides his deer

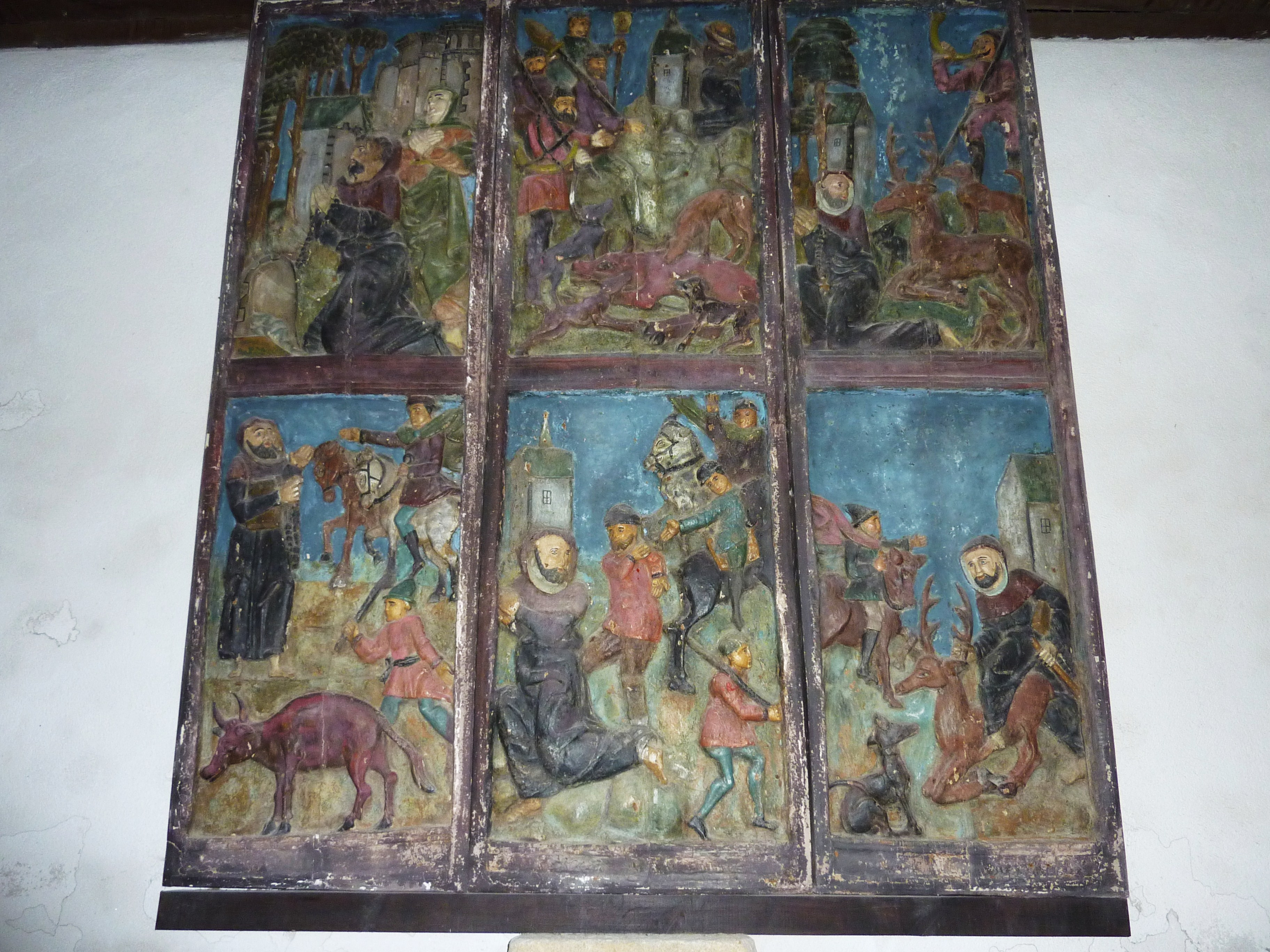
Scenes from Saint Edern's life. Part of the altarpiece

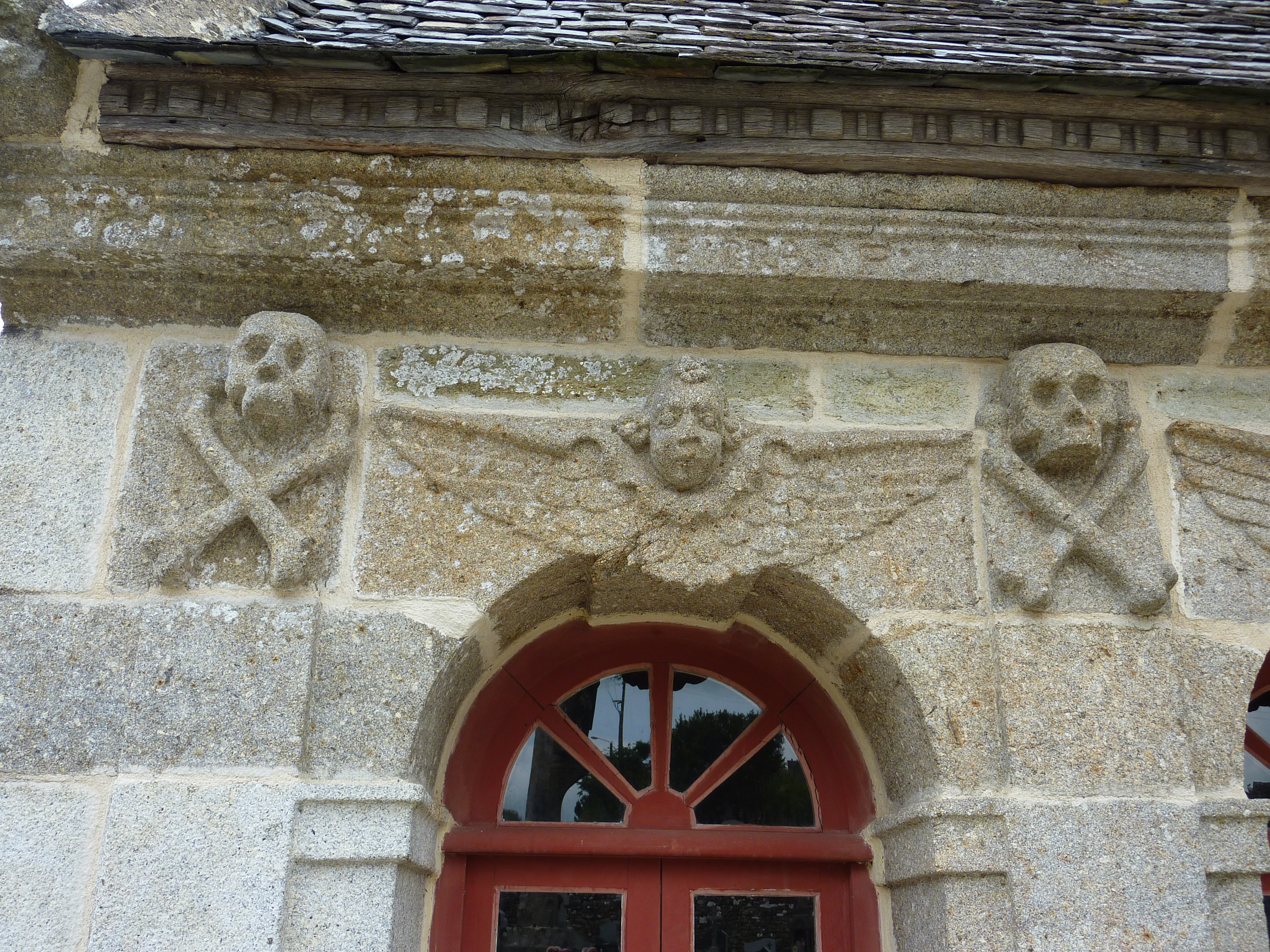
Ankou and winged angels decorate the ossuary
