= Hippolyte Destailleur =

French architect (1822–1893)

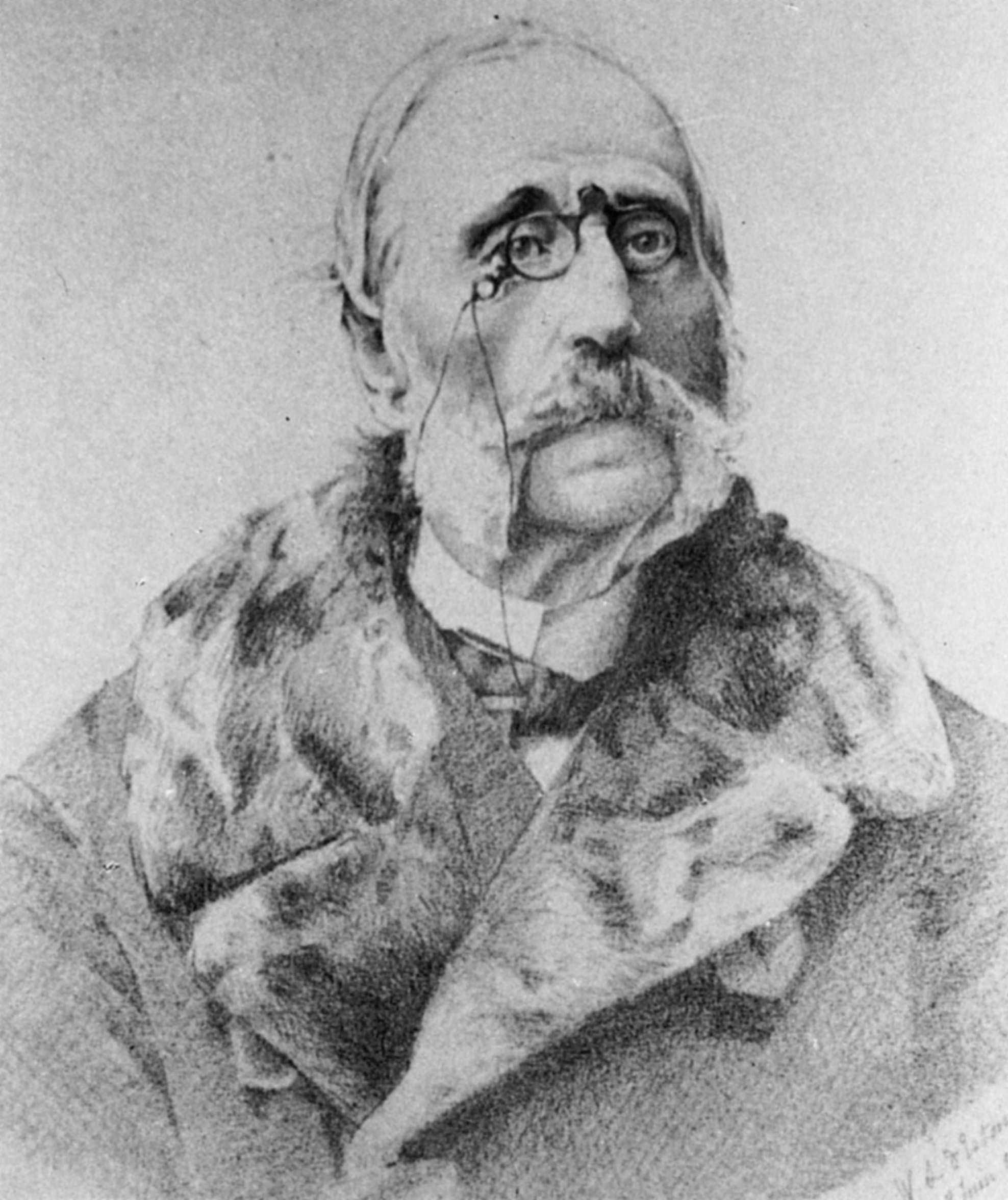
- Born: Hippolyte-Alexandre-Gabriel-Walter Destailleur; September 27, 1822; Paris, France
- Died: November 17, 1893 (aged 71); Paris, France
- Occupations: Architect Interior Designer, Collector

Hippolyte Destailleur (27 September 1822 – 17 November 1893) was a French architect, interior designer, and collector. He is noted for his designs and restoration work for great châteaux in France and in England, as well as his collection of books, prints, and drawings, covering French artists of the 18th and 19th centuries, much of which is now in the Cabinet des Estampes of the Bibliothèque Nationale, Paris (Destailleur Collection).

== Early life and career ==
Born Hippolyte-Alexandre-Gabriel-Walter Destailleur in Paris, he was the son of François-Hippolyte Destailleur (born Paris, 22 March 1787; died Paris, 15 February 1852), also a noted French architect, who studied with Charles Percier and became architect to the Ministère de la Justice in 1819. Hippolyte studied with François-René Leclère at the École des Beaux-Arts in Paris (1842–1846), after which he worked with his father and with Étienne-Hippolyte Godde. In 1853 he became the head of the family practice and succeeded his father at the Ministère de la Justice.

== Later career ==
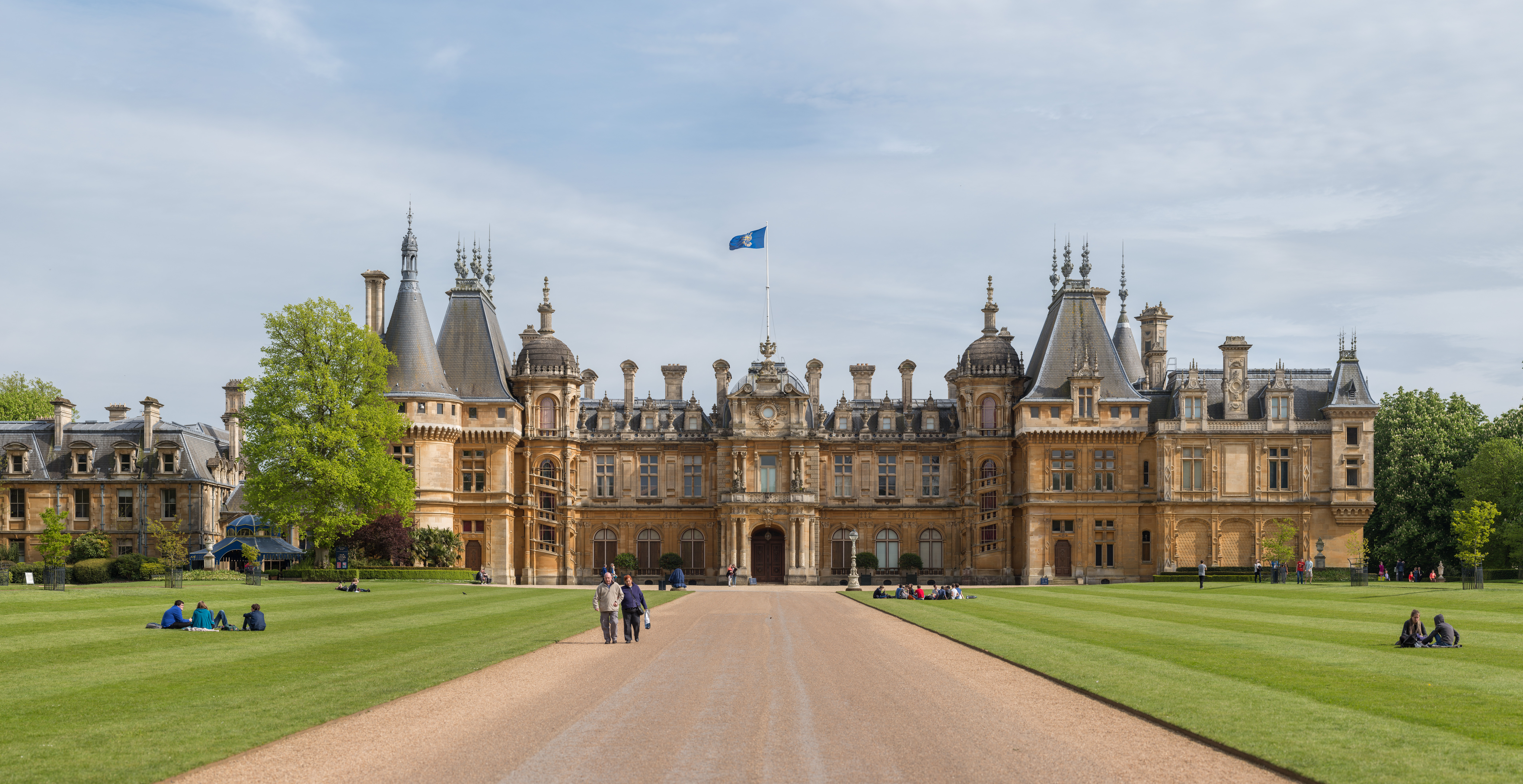
Waddesdon Manor

Hippolyte Destailleur became a fashionable architect, catering to rich and titled clients. He mimicked French styles of the 16th to 18th centuries, distinguishing himself from many of his contemporaries, who favored medieval, Italian Renaissance, or antique models. Among his creations were: Rococo Revival interiors for the Hôtel de Pourtalès in Paris (1865); the reconstruction of Pless Castle (1870–1876); the town house of Graf Hans Heinric von Pless in Berlin (1874–1876); and the Palais Rothschild of Baron Albert de Rothschild in Vienna (1876–1882).

He is one of the best-known foreign architects to have worked in 19th century England, where he designed Waddesdon Manor in Buckinghamshire for Baron Ferdinand de Rothschild (1874–1882) and the Imperial Mausoleum at Saint Michael's Abbey in Farnborough, Hampshire.

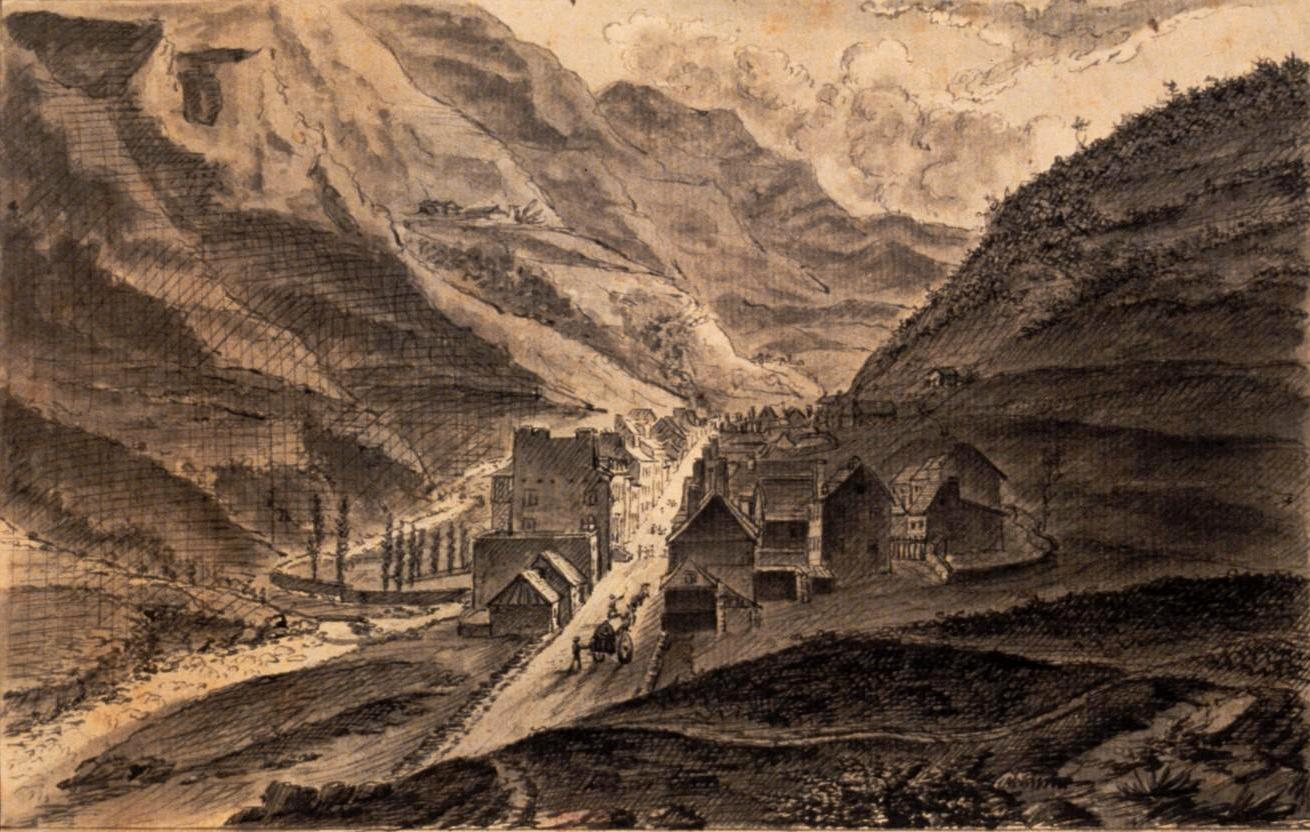
Barèges au XIXéme siècle (collection Hippolyte Destailleur)

He oversaw the designwork and restoration of the Château de Courances and Château de Vaux-le-Vicomte beginning in 1875. He designed the Hôtel de Béhague in Paris (1866–1867) and the Château de Franconville in Oise for the Duc de Massa (1880–1885).

His son Walter-André Destailleur was also an architect, who built the Château de Trévarez.

Hippolyte Destailleur died in Paris.
