= Hôtel de Crillon =

Historic luxury hotel in Paris

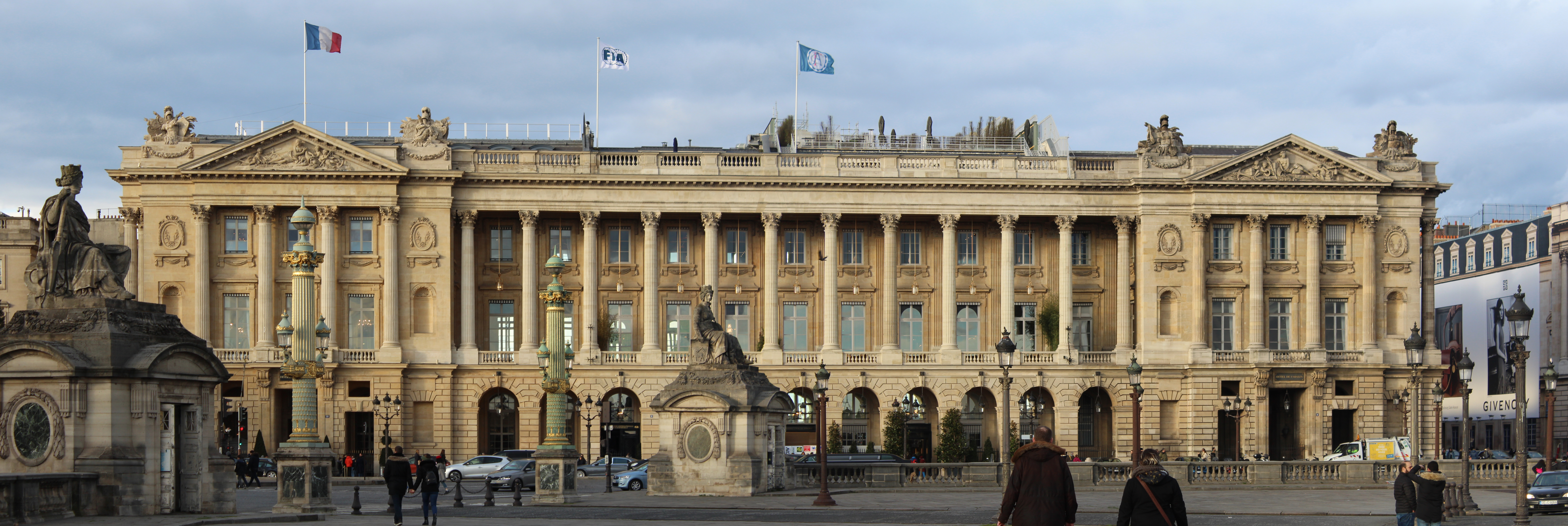
- Hôtel de Crillon
- Interactive map of the Hôtel de Crillon area

General information
- Location: Paris, France, 10, place de la Concorde; 75008 Paris, France
- Opened: 11 March 1909
- Owner: Prince Mutaib bin Abdullah bin Abdulaziz Al Saud
- Operator: Rosewood Hotels & Resorts

Design and construction
- Architects: Ange-Jacques Gabriel; Louis-François Trouard; Walter-André Destailleur

Other information
- Number of rooms: 78
- Number of suites: 46

Website
- www.crillon.com

Hôtel de Crillon, A Rosewood Hotel (French: [otɛl də kʁijɔ̃]) is a historic luxury hotel in Paris which opened in 1909 in a building dating to 1758. Located at the foot of the Champs-Élysées, the Crillon, along with the Hôtel de la Marine, is one of two identical stone palaces on the Place de la Concorde. Since 1900, the French Ministry of Culture has listed the Hôtel de Crillon as a monument historique.

With 78 guest rooms and 46 suites, the hotel also features three restaurants, a bar, outdoor terrace, gym, and health club on the premises. The hotel was renovated from 2013 to 2017. In September 2018, Hôtel de Crillon was officially designated by Atout France as a Palace grade of hotel.

== History ==
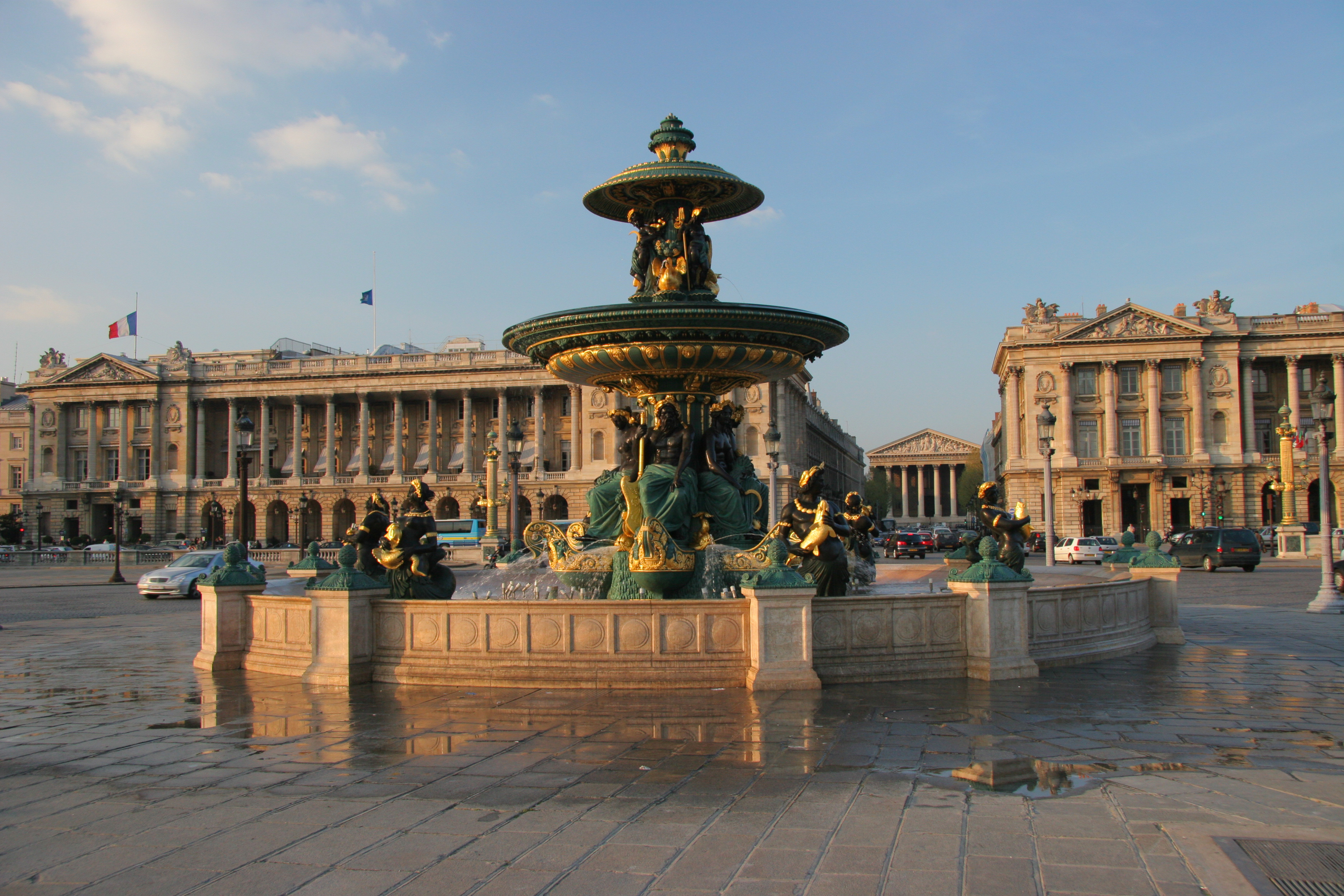
Hôtel de Crillon on the left, with the Hôtel de la Marine on the right

The building that is now the hotel was constructed in 1758, after King Louis XV commissioned the most prolific architect Ange-Jacques Gabriel to build two neoclassical palaces in what would become the Place de la Concorde. The two identical buildings, separated by the Rue Royale, were initially designed to be offices of the French state. The eastern building, Hôtel de la Marine, housed the headquarters of the French Navy until 2015. The western building that would become Hôtel de Crillon was first occupied by Louis Marie Augustin, Duke of Aumont, a famous patron of the arts. The building was further enhanced by its second owner, the architect Louis-François Trouard, who had the Salon de Aigles built in 1775.

On 6 February 1778, the building was the venue where the newly founded United States and France signed their first treaties. Americans Benjamin Franklin, Silas Deane, and Arthur Lee met French diplomat Conrad Alexandre Gérard de Rayneval to conclude the French-American treaty that recognised the Declaration of Independence of the United States and a trade agreement.

In 1788, François Félix de Crillon (son of Louis de Crillon, Duke of Crillon) acquired the building for his home. However, the government of the French Revolution confiscated the property in 1791. During this period, the home was used by King Louis XVI and Queen Marie Antoinette. Two years later in 1793, Louis and Marie were guillotined in the Place de la Concorde directly in front of the building.

Eventually, the building was returned to the Crillon family, whose descendants lived there for more than a century until 1904. In 1906, the Société du Louvre purchased the property and transformed it into a hotel in 1907. The building then underwent a two-year refurbishment under the supervision of architect Walter-André Destailleur. This included the purchase of two neighbouring buildings on the rue Boissy d'Anglas to enlarge the property. The new Hôtel de Crillon opened on 11 March 1909.

The hotel housed members of the American delegation to the Paris Peace Conference after World War I, including President Wilson's key advisor, Edward House.

From 1992 to 2012, the hotel was the venue of the Bal des débutantes, an annual fashion event which was cited by Forbes in 2005 as one of the world's ten best parties. The hotel has been visited by many notable figures over the years, including Theodore Roosevelt, Winston Churchill, Madonna, Taylor Swift, and Roger Federer.

In March 2013, Hôtel de Crillon closed for a series of renovations led by Aline Asmar d'Amman. This project was designed to renovate and modernize the space. The renovation combined the hotel's protected landmark features, such as the 19th-century grand staircase and saloons, with modern styles and amenities. Tristan Auer, Chahan Minassian, Cyril Vergniol and Karl Lagerfeld worked alongside d'Amman on this €200 million project. Karl Lagerfeld designed Les Grands Apartements, the most extravagant suites on the property. The 2013 renovations lasted until July 2017.

== Ownership ==
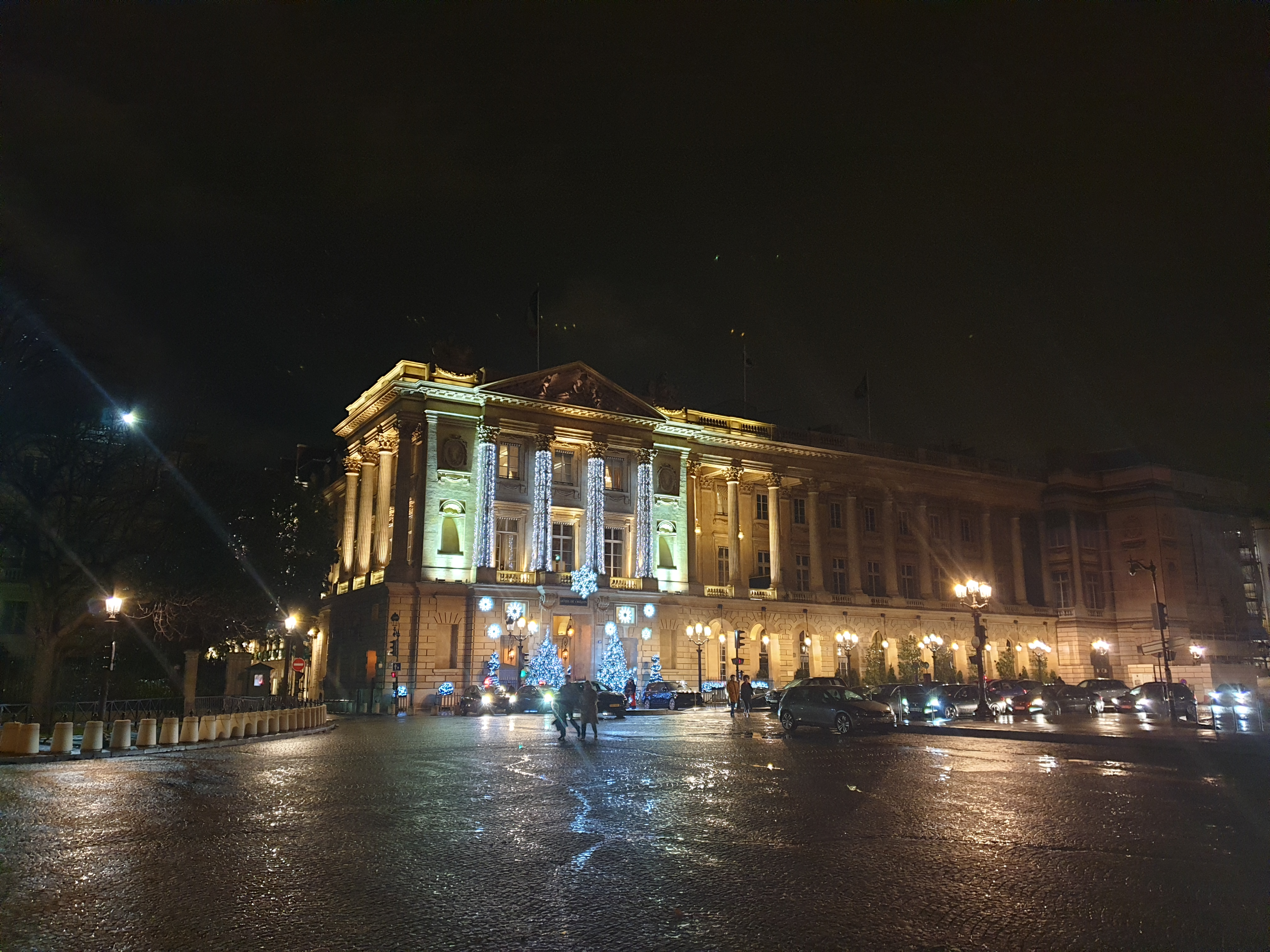
Hôtel de Crillon in 2019

Until 2005, through Concorde Hotels & Resorts, the Hôtel de Crillon was part of the Société du Louvre (whose shares were listed on the Paris Stock Exchange) and was controlled by the Taittinger family holding company. The Starwood Capital Group bought the hotel from the former Taittinger group in 2005.

On 1 November 2010, Le Figaro reported that a sale was in final negotiations to a Saudi group related to the Saudi Arabian royal family. On 23 November 2010, Starwood announced the sale of the hotel to a Saudi Arabian royal family member, Prince Mutaib bin Abdullah bin Abdulaziz Al Saud.

In December 2013, Rosewood Hotels & Resorts announced that it would manage the property, which reopened on 5 July 2017.

== In literature ==
In Ernest Hemingway's The Sun Also Rises (1926), Jake Barnes, the novel's main protagonist, writes letters in the lobby of the Crillon while waiting for his lover, Lady Brett Ashley. Later he enjoys a Jack Rose cocktail at the bar, realizing she has stood him up. It is also mentioned in Hemingway's The Snows of Kilimanjaro.

George Orwell's Down and Out in Paris and London described his working in near-slavery conditions as a dishwasher at a Paris restaurant in 1929, later revealed to be the Crillon.

Jack Maye in Ian McEwan's The Children Act (2014) has a Ne Pas Déranger sign from the Hôtel de Crillon in his office, taken at the end of his honeymoon.

== See also ==
- Albert Champion
- Prince Mutaib bin Abdullah Al Saud
