= Trégourez =

Trégourez Tregoures
- Commune
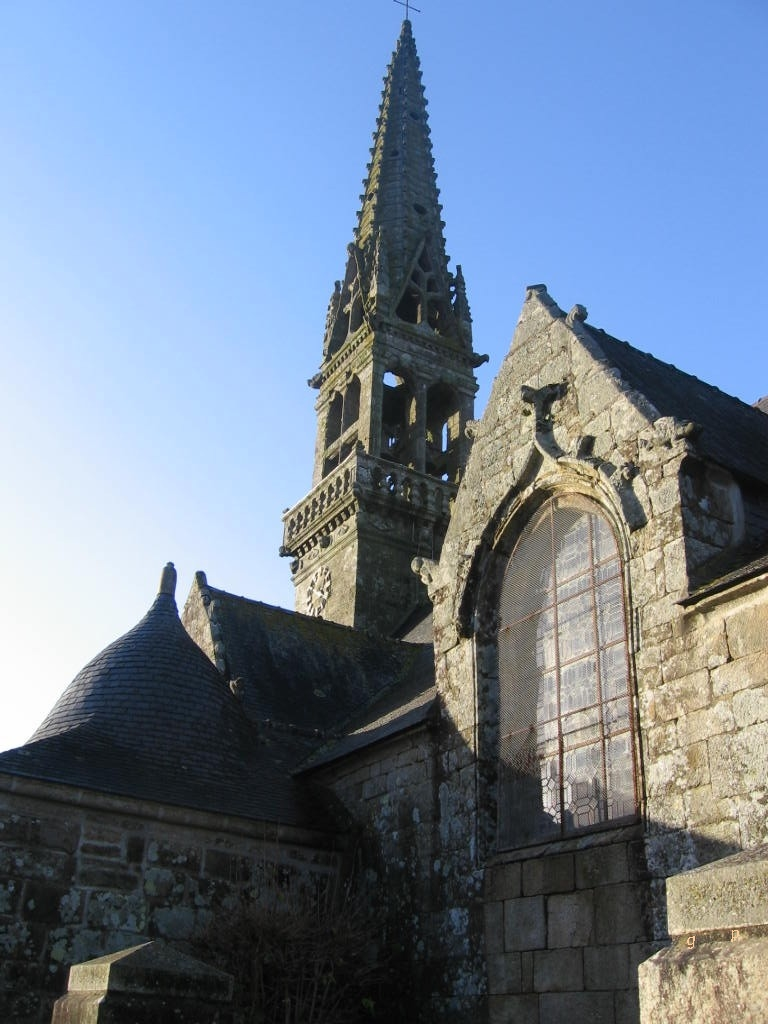
- The parish church of Saint-Idunet

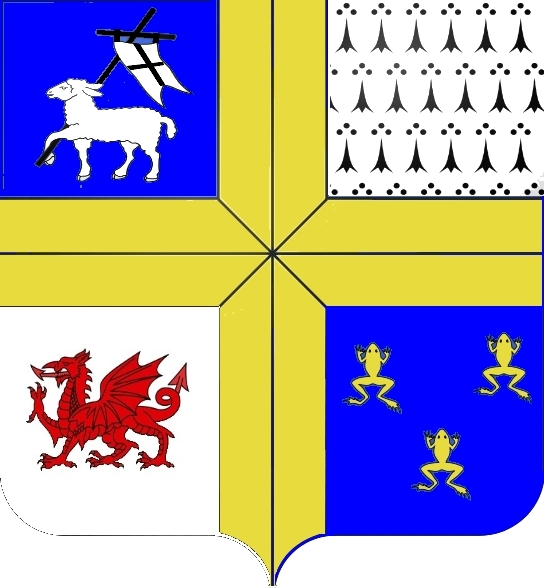
- Coat of arms
- Location of Trégourez
- Location within France Location within Brittany
- Coordinates: 48°06′23″N 3°51′42″W
- Country: France
- Region: Brittany
- Department: Finistère
- Arrondissement: Châteaulin
- Canton: Briec
- Intercommunality: Haute Cornouaille

Government
  - Mayor (2022–2026): Lenaïk Bourhis-Jourdren
- Area^{1}: 17.72 km^{2} (6.84 sq mi)
- Highest elevation: 227 m (745 ft)
- Lowest elevation: 85 m (279 ft)
- Population (2023): 947
  - Density: 53.4/km^{2} (138/sq mi)
- Time zone: UTC+01:00 (CET)
  - Summer (DST): UTC+02:00 (CEST)
- INSEE/Postal code: 29291 /29970
- ^{1} French Land Register data, which excludes lakes, ponds, glaciers > 1 km^{2} (0.386 sq mi or 247 acres) and river estuaries.

Trégourez (Breton: Tregoures) is a commune in the Finistère department of Brittany in north-western France.

== Population ==
Inhabitants of Trégourez are called in French Trégourézois.

Historical population

Year	Pop.	±% p.a.
1793	891	—
1800	948	+0.89%
1806	920	−0.50%
1821	1,008	+0.61%
1831	1,058	+0.49%
1836	1,085	+0.51%
1841	1,074	−0.20%
1846	1,065	−0.17%
1851	1,081	+0.30%
1856	1,101	+0.37%
1861	1,115	+0.25%
1866	1,255	+2.39%
1872	1,122	−1.85%
1876	1,170	+1.05%
1881	1,190	+0.34%
1886	1,185	−0.08%
1891	1,255	+1.15%
1896	1,256	+0.02%
1901	1,292	+0.57%

Year	Pop.	±% p.a.
1906	1,470	+2.62%
1911	1,502	+0.43%
1921	1,410	−0.63%
1926	1,336	−1.07%
1931	1,275	−0.93%
1936	1,313	+0.59%
1946	1,213	−0.79%
1954	1,129	−0.89%
1962	1,111	−0.20%
1968	1,004	−1.67%
1975	921	−1.23%
1982	878	−0.68%
1990	939	+0.84%
1999	949	+0.12%
2007	944	−0.07%
2012	981	+0.77%
2017	972	−0.18%
2023	947	−0.43%

Source: EHESS and INSEE (1968-2023)

== Map ==
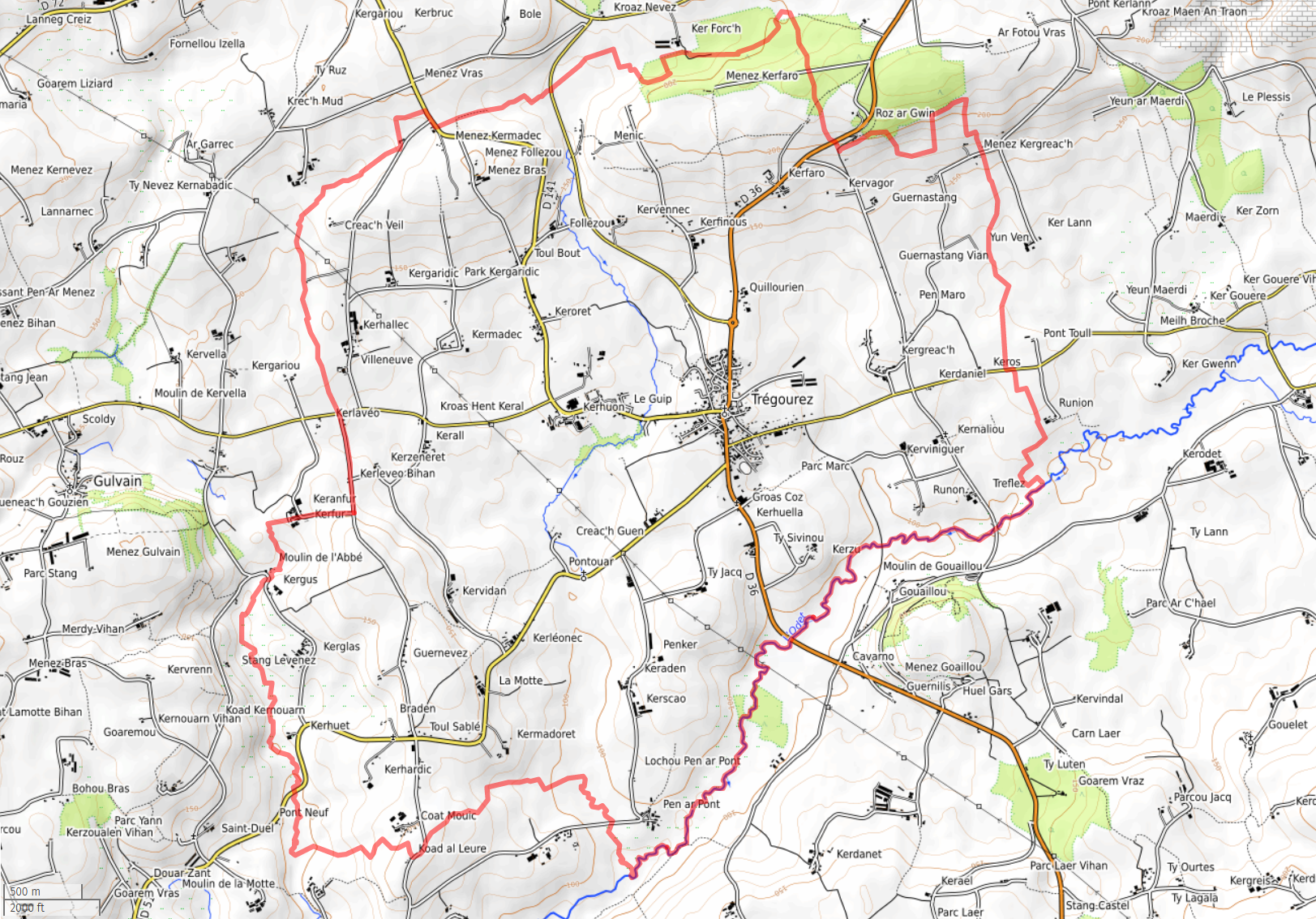
Topographic map

== See also ==
- Communes of the Finistère department
