= Lennon, Finistère =

Lennon Lennon
- Commune
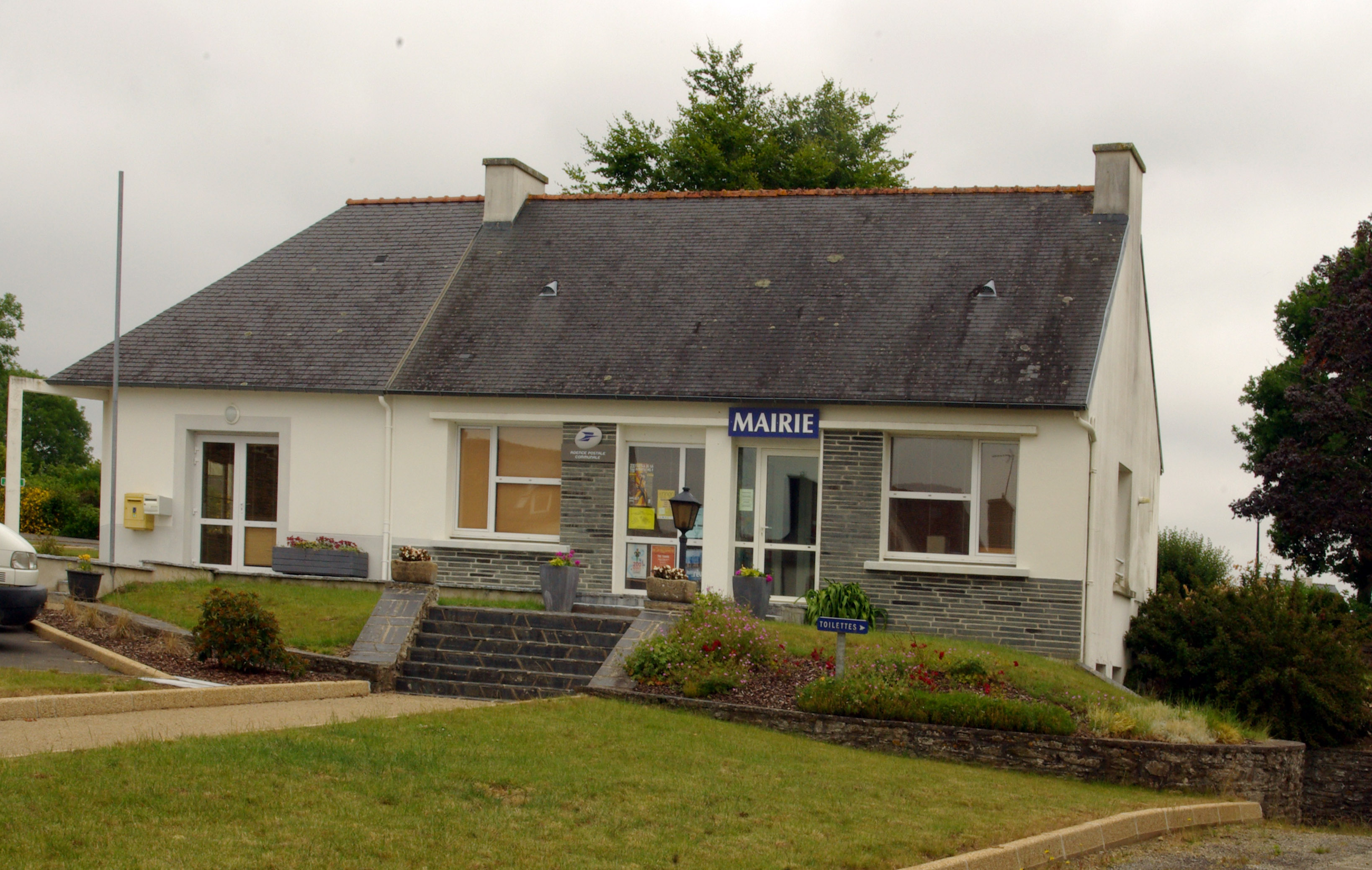
- The town hall and post office in Lennon
- Location of Lennon
- Location within France Location within Brittany
- Coordinates: 48°11′34″N 3°53′50″W
- Country: France
- Region: Brittany
- Department: Finistère
- Arrondissement: Châteaulin
- Canton: Briec

Government
  - Mayor (2020–2026): Jean-Luc Vigouroux
- Area^{1}: 22.94 km^{2} (8.86 sq mi)
- Highest elevation: 151 m (495 ft)
- Lowest elevation: 27 m (89 ft)
- Population (2023): 812
  - Density: 35.4/km^{2} (91.7/sq mi)
- Time zone: UTC+01:00 (CET)
  - Summer (DST): UTC+02:00 (CEST)
- INSEE/Postal code: 29123 /29190
- ^{1} French Land Register data, which excludes lakes, ponds, glaciers > 1 km^{2} (0.386 sq mi or 247 acres) and river estuaries.

Lennon (French pronunciation: [lɛnɔ̃]; Breton: Lennon) is a commune in the Finistère department of Brittany in north-western France.

== Population ==
Inhabitants of Lennon are called in French Lennonais.

Historical population

Year	Pop.	±% p.a.
1793	1,204	—
1800	1,307	+1.18%
1806	1,147	−2.15%
1821	1,219	+0.41%
1831	1,229	+0.08%
1836	1,354	+1.96%
1841	1,395	+0.60%
1846	1,508	+1.57%
1851	1,502	−0.08%
1856	1,450	−0.70%
1861	1,456	+0.08%
1866	1,512	+0.76%
1872	1,568	+0.61%
1876	1,667	+1.54%
1881	1,655	−0.14%
1886	1,723	+0.81%
1891	1,759	+0.41%
1896	1,816	+0.64%
1901	1,841	+0.27%

Year	Pop.	±% p.a.
1906	1,763	−0.86%
1911	1,756	−0.08%
1921	1,560	−1.18%
1926	1,427	−1.77%
1931	1,418	−0.13%
1936	1,354	−0.92%
1946	1,383	+0.21%
1954	1,087	−2.97%
1962	1,042	−0.53%
1968	922	−2.02%
1975	770	−2.54%
1982	652	−2.35%
1990	646	−0.12%
1999	645	−0.02%
2007	751	+1.92%
2012	822	+1.82%
2017	788	−0.84%
2023	812	+0.50%

Source: EHESS and INSEE (1968-2023)

== See also ==
- Communes of the Finistère department
