= Le Cloître-Pleyben =

Le Cloître-Pleyben Kloastr-Pleiben
- Commune
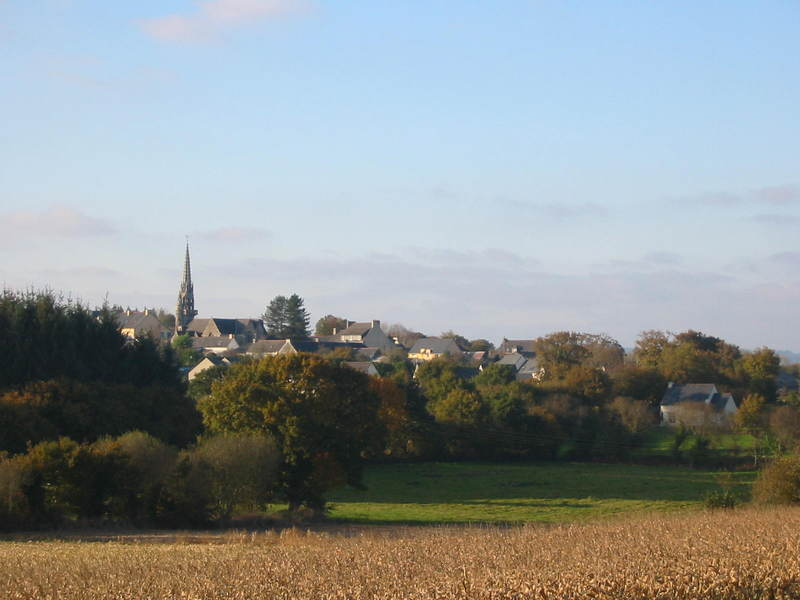
- A general view of Le Cloître-Pleyben
- Location of Le Cloître-Pleyben
- Location within France Location within Brittany
- Coordinates: 48°15′28″N 3°53′21″W
- Country: France
- Region: Brittany
- Department: Finistère
- Arrondissement: Châteaulin
- Canton: Briec

Government
  - Mayor (2020–2026): Dominique Bilirit
- Area^{1}: 20.42 km^{2} (7.88 sq mi)
- Highest elevation: 167 m (548 ft)
- Lowest elevation: 65 m (213 ft)
- Population (2023): 502
  - Density: 24.6/km^{2} (63.7/sq mi)
- Time zone: UTC+01:00 (CET)
  - Summer (DST): UTC+02:00 (CEST)
- INSEE/Postal code: 29033 /29190
- ^{1} French Land Register data, which excludes lakes, ponds, glaciers > 1 km^{2} (0.386 sq mi or 247 acres) and river estuaries.

Le Cloître-Pleyben (French pronunciation: [lə klwatʁ plɛbɛ̃]; Breton: Kloastr-Pleiben) is a commune in the Finistère department of Brittany in north-western France.

== Population ==
Historical population
Year	Pop.	±% p.a.
1968	791	—
1975	673	−2.28%
1982	588	−1.91%
1990	512	−1.72%
1999	536	+0.51%
2007	567	+0.71%
2012	576	+0.32%
2017	531	−1.61%
2023	502	−0.93%
Source: INSEE

Inhabitants of Le Cloître-Pleyben are called in French Cloîtriens.

== See also ==
- Communes of the Finistère department
