= Lothey =

Lothey Lotei
- Commune
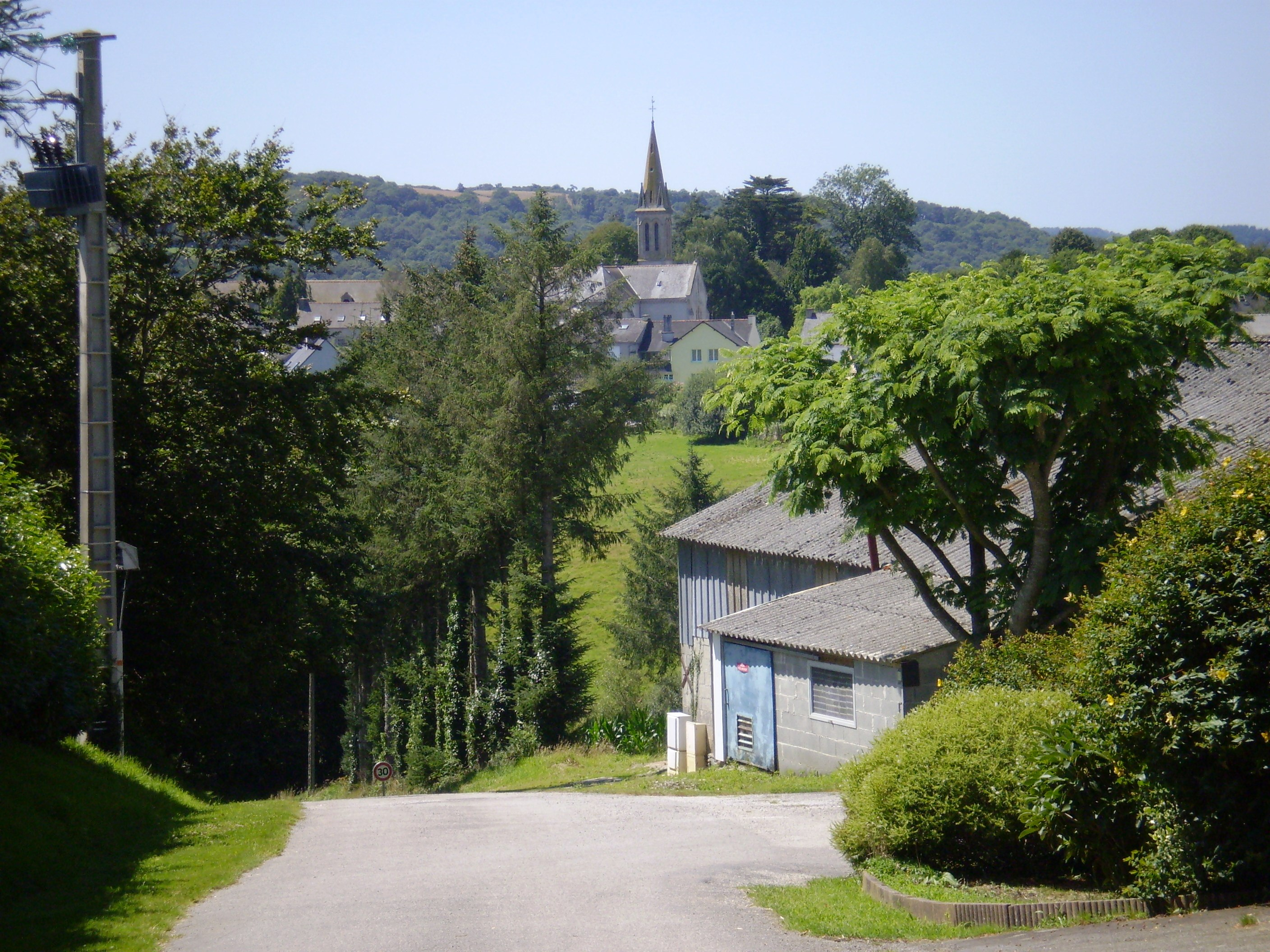
- Lothey, with a general view of Landremel
- Location of Lothey
- Location within France Location within Brittany
- Coordinates: 48°10′58″N 4°01′34″W
- Country: France
- Region: Brittany
- Department: Finistère
- Arrondissement: Châteaulin
- Canton: Briec
- Intercommunality: Pleyben-Châteaulin-Porzay

Government
  - Mayor (2020–2026): Aurelie Macaclin
- Area^{1}: 13.48 km^{2} (5.20 sq mi)
- Highest elevation: 166 m (545 ft)
- Lowest elevation: 12 m (39 ft)
- Population (2023): 424
  - Density: 31.5/km^{2} (81.5/sq mi)
- Time zone: UTC+01:00 (CET)
  - Summer (DST): UTC+02:00 (CEST)
- INSEE/Postal code: 29142 /29190
- ^{1} French Land Register data, which excludes lakes, ponds, glaciers > 1 km^{2} (0.386 sq mi or 247 acres) and river estuaries.

Lothey (French pronunciation: [lɔtɛj]; Breton: Lotei) is a commune in the Finistère department of Brittany in north-western France.

== Population ==
Inhabitants of Lothey are called in French Lotheyens.

== See also ==
- Communes of the Finistère department
