= Saint-Goazec =

Saint-Goazec Sant-Wazeg
- Commune
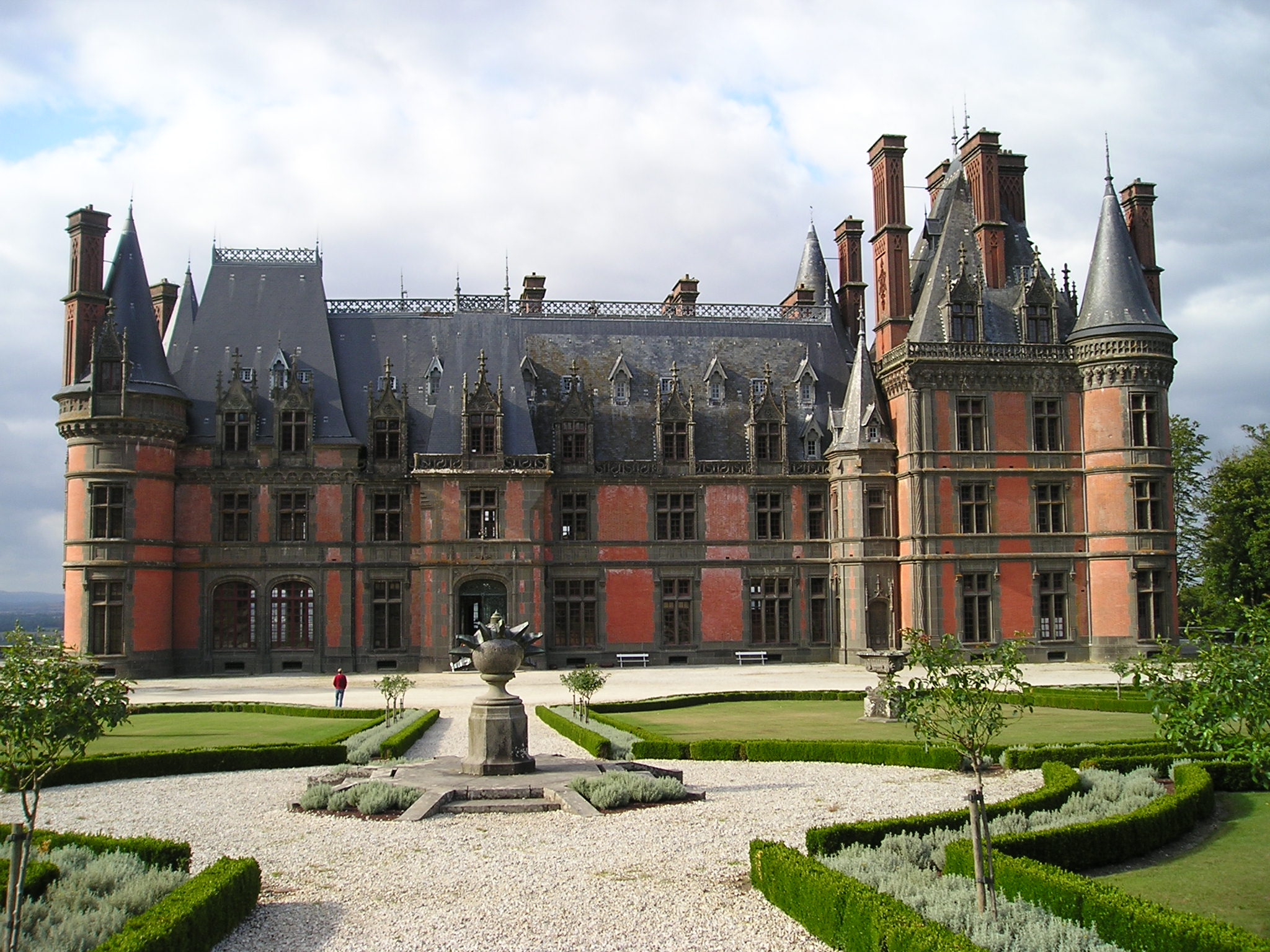
- The Château de Trévarez
- Location of Saint-Goazec
- Location within France Location within Brittany
- Coordinates: 48°09′52″N 3°46′51″W
- Country: France
- Region: Brittany
- Department: Finistère
- Arrondissement: Châteaulin
- Canton: Briec
- Intercommunality: Haute Cornouaille

Government
  - Mayor (2020–2026): Stéphane Guillou
- Area^{1}: 33.76 km^{2} (13.03 sq mi)
- Highest elevation: 295 m (968 ft)
- Lowest elevation: 33 m (108 ft)
- Population (2023): 739
  - Density: 21.9/km^{2} (56.7/sq mi)
- Time zone: UTC+01:00 (CET)
  - Summer (DST): UTC+02:00 (CEST)
- INSEE/Postal code: 29249 /29520
- ^{1} French Land Register data, which excludes lakes, ponds, glaciers > 1 km^{2} (0.386 sq mi or 247 acres) and river estuaries.

Saint-Goazec (French pronunciation: [sɛ̃ ɡwazɛk]; Breton: Sant-Wazeg) in commune in the Finistère department of Brittany in northwestern France.

== Population ==
Inhabitants of Saint-Goazec are called in French Saint-Goaziens. The commune's population peaked in 1906.

Historical population

Year	Pop.	±% p.a.
1793	1,075	—
1800	898	−2.54%
1806	986	+1.57%
1821	815	−1.26%
1831	1,104	+3.08%
1836	1,135	+0.56%
1841	1,104	−0.55%
1846	1,121	+0.31%
1851	1,105	−0.29%
1856	1,053	−0.96%
1861	1,099	+0.86%
1866	1,230	+2.28%
1872	1,201	−0.40%
1876	1,307	+2.14%
1881	1,362	+0.83%
1886	1,420	+0.84%
1891	1,480	+0.83%
1896	1,555	+0.99%
1901	1,740	+2.27%

Year	Pop.	±% p.a.
1906	1,860	+1.34%
1911	1,774	−0.94%
1921	1,605	−1.00%
1926	1,569	−0.45%
1931	1,562	−0.09%
1936	1,439	−1.63%
1946	1,510	+0.48%
1954	1,121	−3.66%
1962	1,042	−0.91%
1968	976	−1.08%
1975	845	−2.04%
1982	876	+0.52%
1990	771	−1.58%
1999	725	−0.68%
2007	705	−0.35%
2012	713	+0.23%
2017	706	−0.20%
2023	739	+0.76%

Source: EHESS and INSEE (1968-2023)

== Geography ==
Saint-Goazec lies on the northern slope of the Montagnes Noires (french, Black Mountains). The canal de Nantes à Brest, which is the canalized river Aulne, forms the commune's northern border.

== Map ==
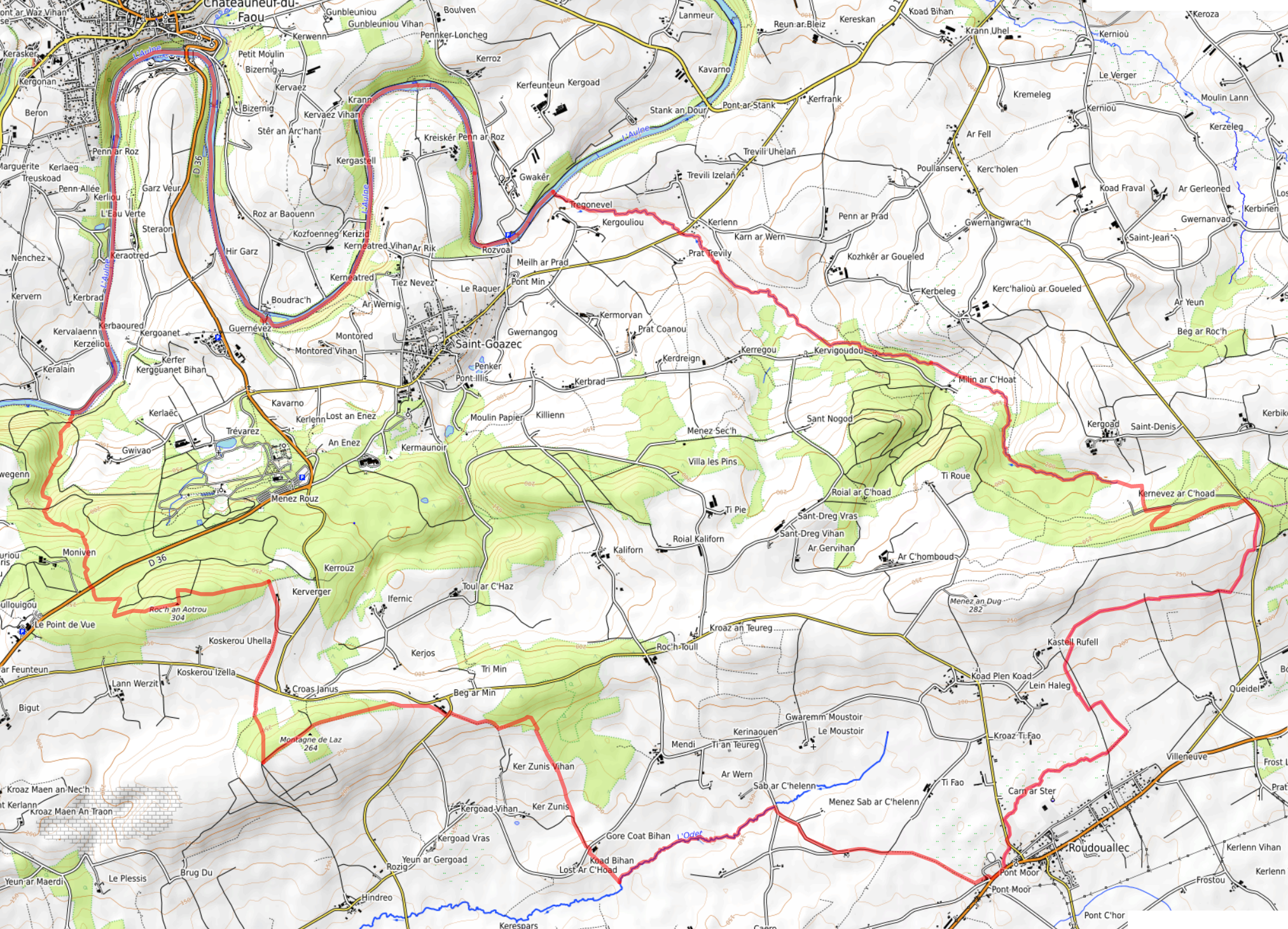
Topographic map

== See also ==
- Communes of the Finistère department
- Listing of the works of the atelier of the Maître de Tronoën
