= Saint Edern =

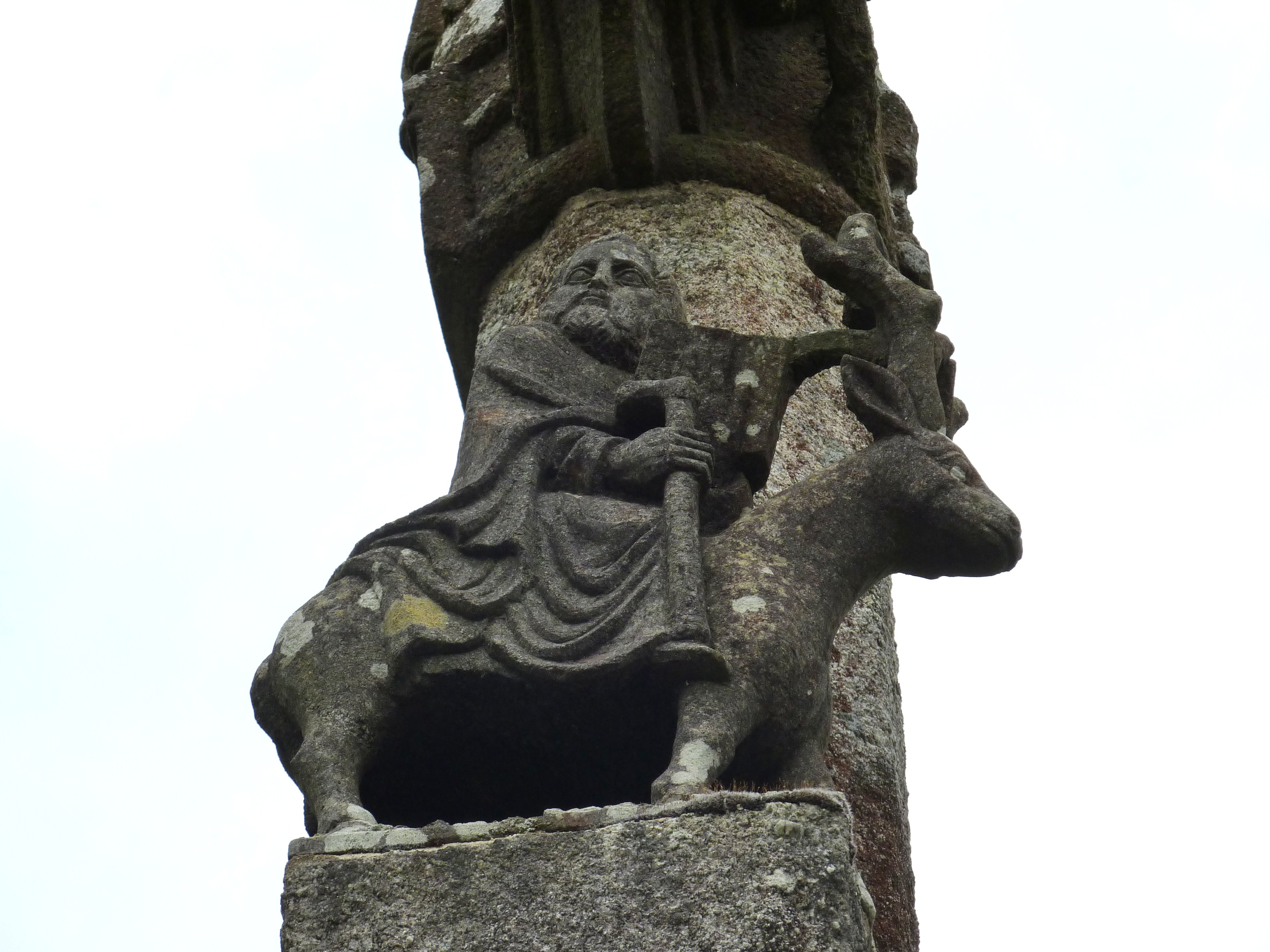
- Born: 9th century Wales
- Died: 10th century Lannedern, Brittany
- Venerated in: Roman Catholic Church
- Canonized: pre-congregation
- Feast: 26 August
- Attributes: riding a stag

Saint Edern was a monk of the end of the ninth century, feast 26 August (31 August or 1 September by the old liturgical calendar). The Welsh Edern ap Nudd appears to be identical with Edern of Brittany, whose cult was important in Finistère.

== Biography ==
After living in two hermitages in Wales, Edern settled in Brittany. He first evangelised Plouédern. Accompanied by his sister Jenovefa (who could be a figure of St. Genevieve, or St. Genevieve herself), he then settled in Ker ar Zant in Edern. They took a road leading to a high summit on which he built a house for his sister and a simple hut for himself. The name of Edern, Finistère comes from the hermitage of Saint Edern.

== Legends ==
Three main legendary stories concern him:

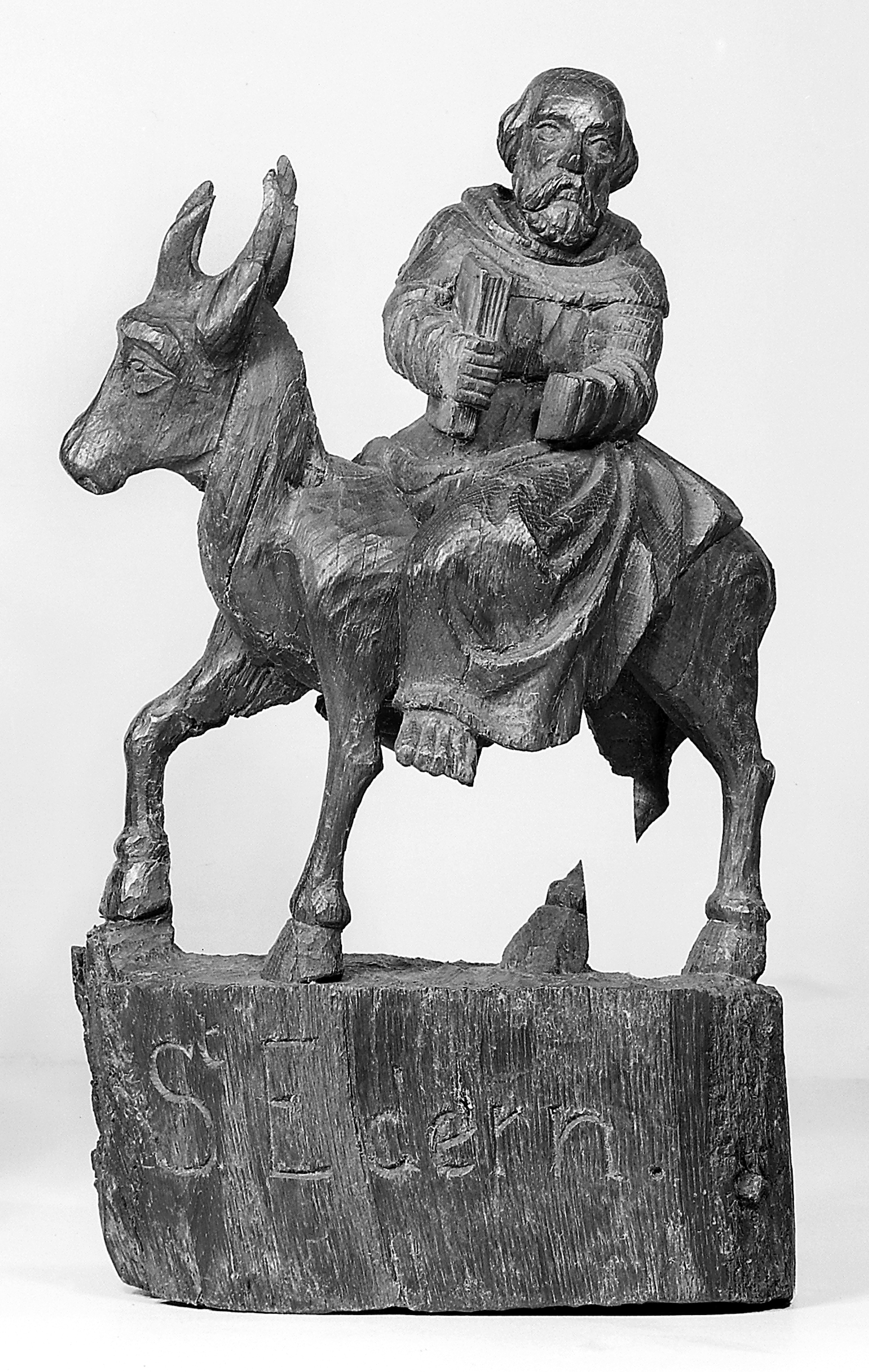
Saint Edeyrn

- Saint Edern's stag: pursued by a gentleman and his dogs, a stag took refuge under Edern's monastic robe, seeming to ask him asylum to escape death. Tamed, the stag never left him, remaining his companion until death. This is why St. Edern is almost always represented riding a deer. The fall and regrowth of antlers could symbolize death and resurrection. According to another version, he met this deer one evening, and riding all night on the back of the animal, delimited the borders of the country he was to Christianize.
- The cow of St. Edern: the hermit had a poor cow that had gone astray on the lands of the lord of Quistinit, a neighboring castle. The cow had been left for dead, attacked on his orders by the dogs of this lord. The hermit brought her back to life. Had the lord been more insightful, he would have noticed that where this cow grazed, wheat grew in greater abundance.
- His meeting with the duke of Brittany and his troops: passing by the Bois de Coat-ar-Roch where the hermit lived, a soldier of the duke struck on the right cheek Edern who did not answer his request for information fast enough because he was looking for his way. In accordance with the Gospel, Edern offered his left cheek. But the divine chastisement struck the entire throng with blindness until it reached Leon. The Duke having vowed to build a church where he would recover his sight, it happened at the place henceforth called Plouedern, where a church was erected in honor of St. Edern.

Edern died at Lannedern, where his tomb is located, at an unknown date, on 1 September.

== Veneration ==
There is a church dedicated to Saint Edern in Edern, Gwynedd. St. Edern was invoked under the name of Sancti Egidii, especially to combat eye diseases.
