= Gouézec =

Gouézec Gouezeg
- Commune
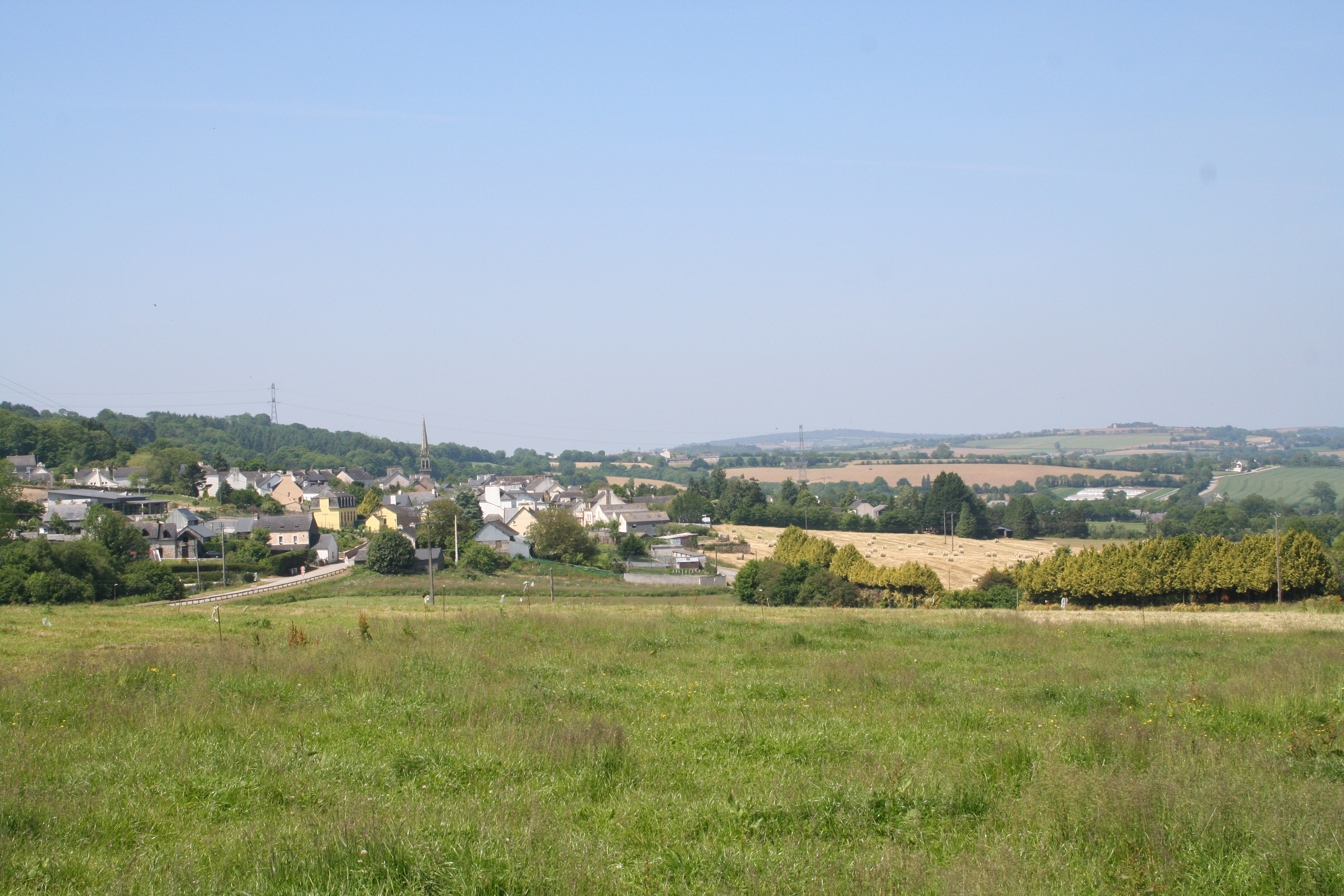
- A general view of Gouézec
- Location of Gouézec
- Location within France Location within Brittany
- Coordinates: 48°10′12″N 3°58′15″W
- Country: France
- Region: Brittany
- Department: Finistère
- Arrondissement: Châteaulin
- Canton: Briec
- Intercommunality: Pleyben-Châteaulin-Porzay

Government
  - Mayor (2020–2026): Cécile Nay
- Area^{1}: 30.94 km^{2} (11.95 sq mi)
- Highest elevation: 270 m (890 ft)
- Lowest elevation: 19 m (62 ft)
- Population (2023): 1,111
  - Density: 35.91/km^{2} (93.00/sq mi)
- Time zone: UTC+01:00 (CET)
  - Summer (DST): UTC+02:00 (CEST)
- INSEE/Postal code: 29062 /29190
- ^{1} French Land Register data, which excludes lakes, ponds, glaciers > 1 km^{2} (0.386 sq mi or 247 acres) and river estuaries.

Gouézec (French pronunciation: [ɡwezɛk]; Breton: Gouezeg) is a commune in the Finistère department of Brittany in north-western France.

== Population ==
Historical population
Year	Pop.	±% p.a.
1968	1,212	—
1975	1,062	−1.87%
1982	1,070	+0.11%
1990	1,076	+0.07%
1999	984	−0.99%
2007	1,063	+0.97%
2012	1,125	+1.14%
2017	1,100	−0.45%
2023	1,111	+0.17%
Source: INSEE

Inhabitants of Gouézec are called in French Gouézécois.

== Geography ==
The river Aulne forms the commune's northern border. The Kareg an Tan (270 meters above sea level) is the highest peak in the village.

== Map ==
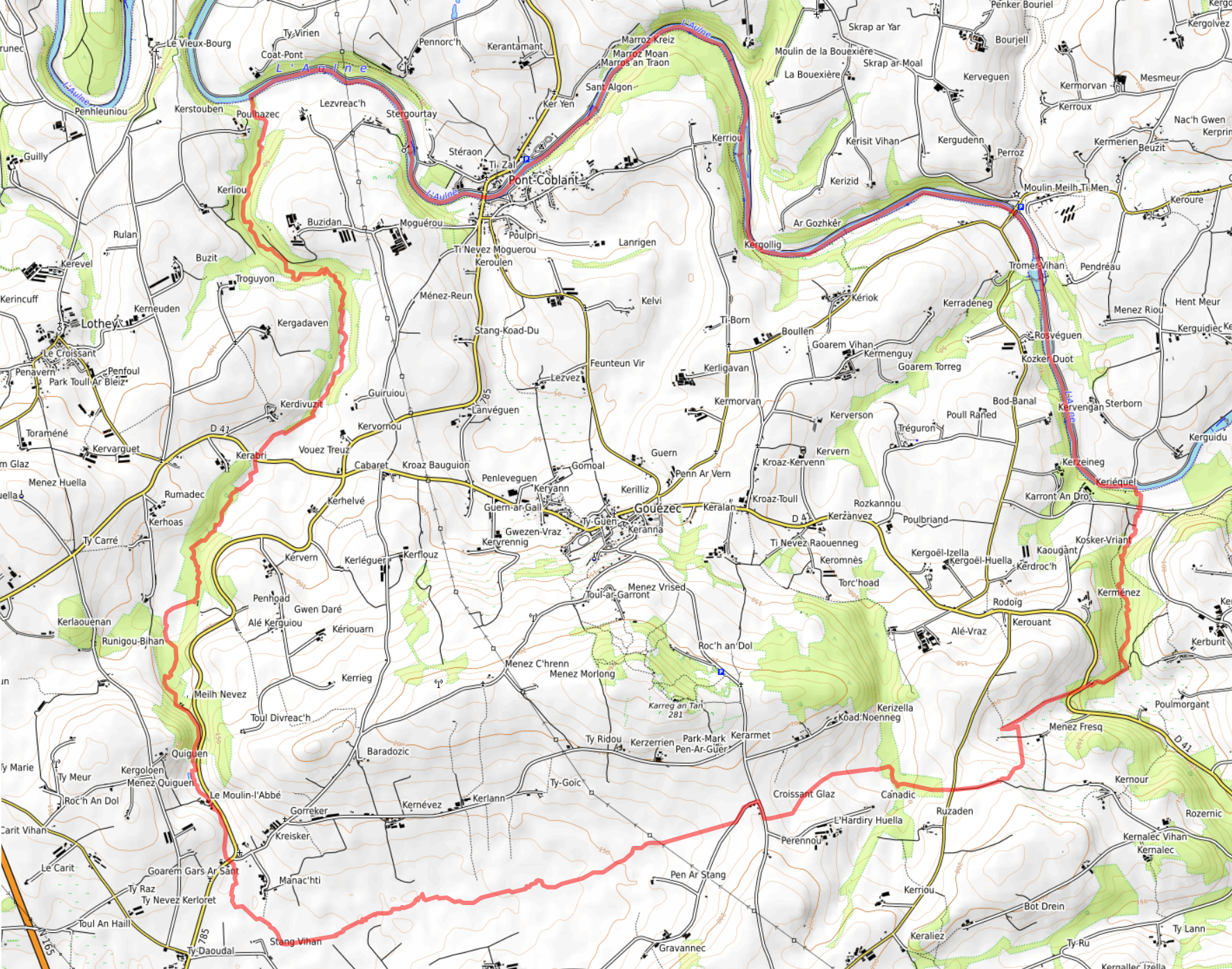
Topographic map

== See also ==
- Communes of the Finistère department
