= Canton of Briec =

Coordinates: 48°05′08″N 3°59′02″W

Briec
- Canton
- Interactive map of Briec
- Country: France
- Region: Brittany
- Department: Finistère
- No. of communes: {{{nbcomm}}}

Government
  - Representatives (2021–2028): Raymond Messager and Amélie Caro
- Area: 548.74 km^{2} (211.87 sq mi)
- Population (2023): 27,939
  - Density: 50.915/km^{2} (131.87/sq mi)
- INSEE code: 29 06

The Canton of Briec is a French canton, located in the arrondissement of Quimper, in the Finistère département (Brittany région). Since the French canton reorganisation which came into effect in March 2015, the communes of the canton of Briec are:

- Briec (seat)
- Châteauneuf-du-Faou
- Le Cloître-Pleyben
- Coray
- Edern
- Gouézec
- Landrévarzec
- Landudal
- Langolen
- Lannédern
- Laz
- Lennon
- Leuhan
- Lothey
- Pleyben
- Saint-Goazec
- Saint-Thois
- Trégourez

== See also ==
- Cantons of the Finistère department
- List of cantons of France
- Arrondissements of the Finistère department
