= James Marie-Antoine Monjaret de Kerjégu =

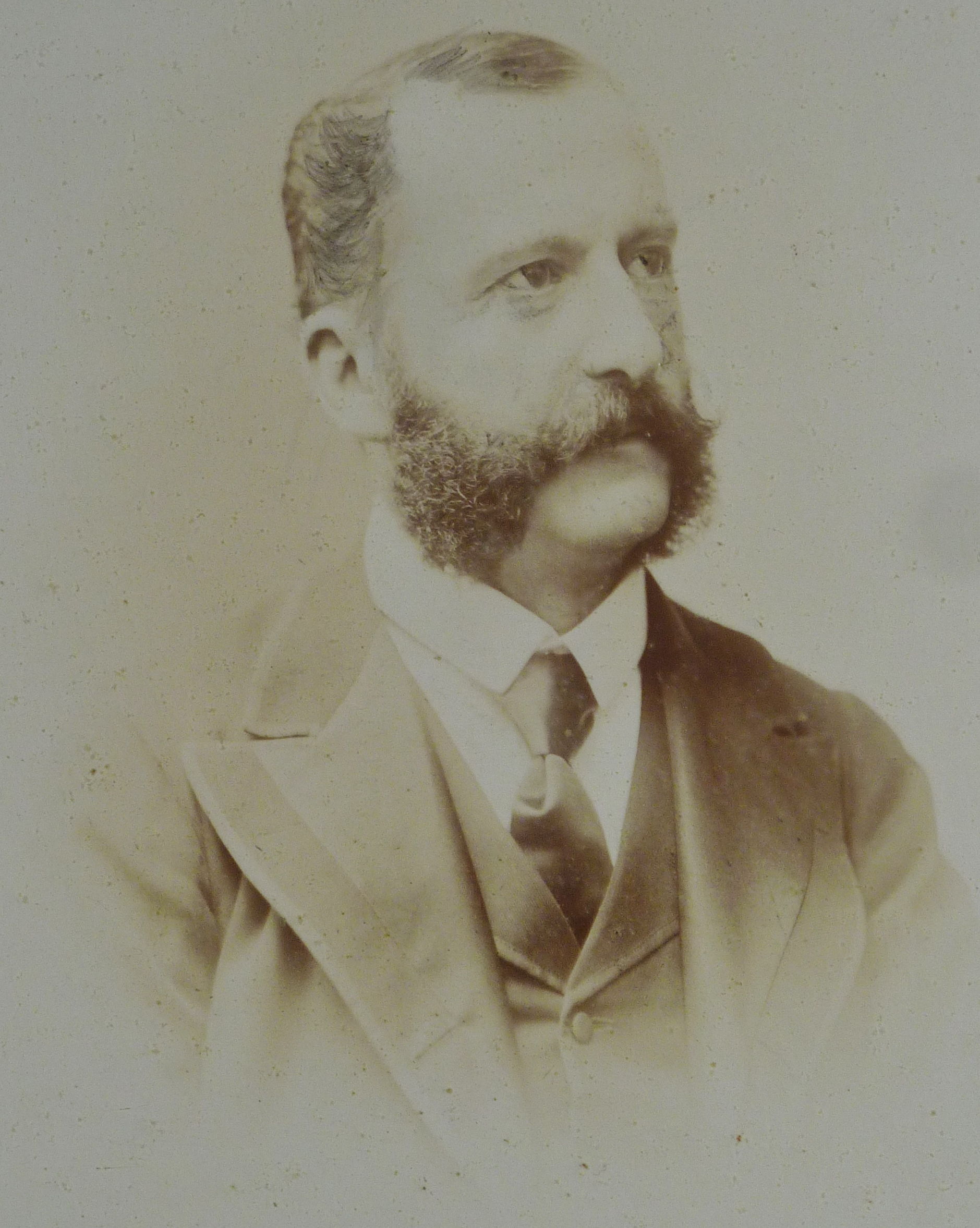

James Marie-Antoine Monjaret de Kerjégu (27 February 1846 – 23 December 1908), French diplomat and politician, was born in Trévarez-Saint-Goazec (Finistère) to an ancient Breton family; his father, François-Marie Jacques de Kerjégu, was a member of the Chamber of Deputies and later a senator; two of his uncles had also been members of parliament.

After a stint in the diplomatic service of the Second Empire from 1867 until 1870, he saw service during the siege of Paris in the Franco-Prussian War. He then returned to the diplomatic service, occupying posts in Germany, Serbia, Russia, and Switzerland.

Kerjégu stood in the election of 1889 as a republican candidate, winning election with some 94% of the votes cast in his constituency in the Finistère. A committed republican, he was dedicated to law and order and governmental stability. He concerned himself particularly with economic and agricultural issues, and supported progressive causes, including welfare and public disability insurance. On the other hand, he opposed the progressive income tax and the separation of church and state, and he favoured a strong military.

He died in Paris during his fifth term in the Chamber.

== Sources ==
- Jolly, Jean, dir. Dictionnaire des parlementaires français: Notices biographiques sur les ministres, députés et sénateurs français de 1889 à 1940. 6 vols. Paris: Presses universitaires de France, 1960–70.
