= Walter-André Destailleur =

French architect

Walter-André Destailleur (born in Thais, Seine, 12 June 1867 – died March 1940) was a French architect, who designed and built the Château de Trévarez (1893–1907). He was the son of the architect Hippolyte Destailleur.
