= Lannédern =

Lannédern Lannedern
- Commune
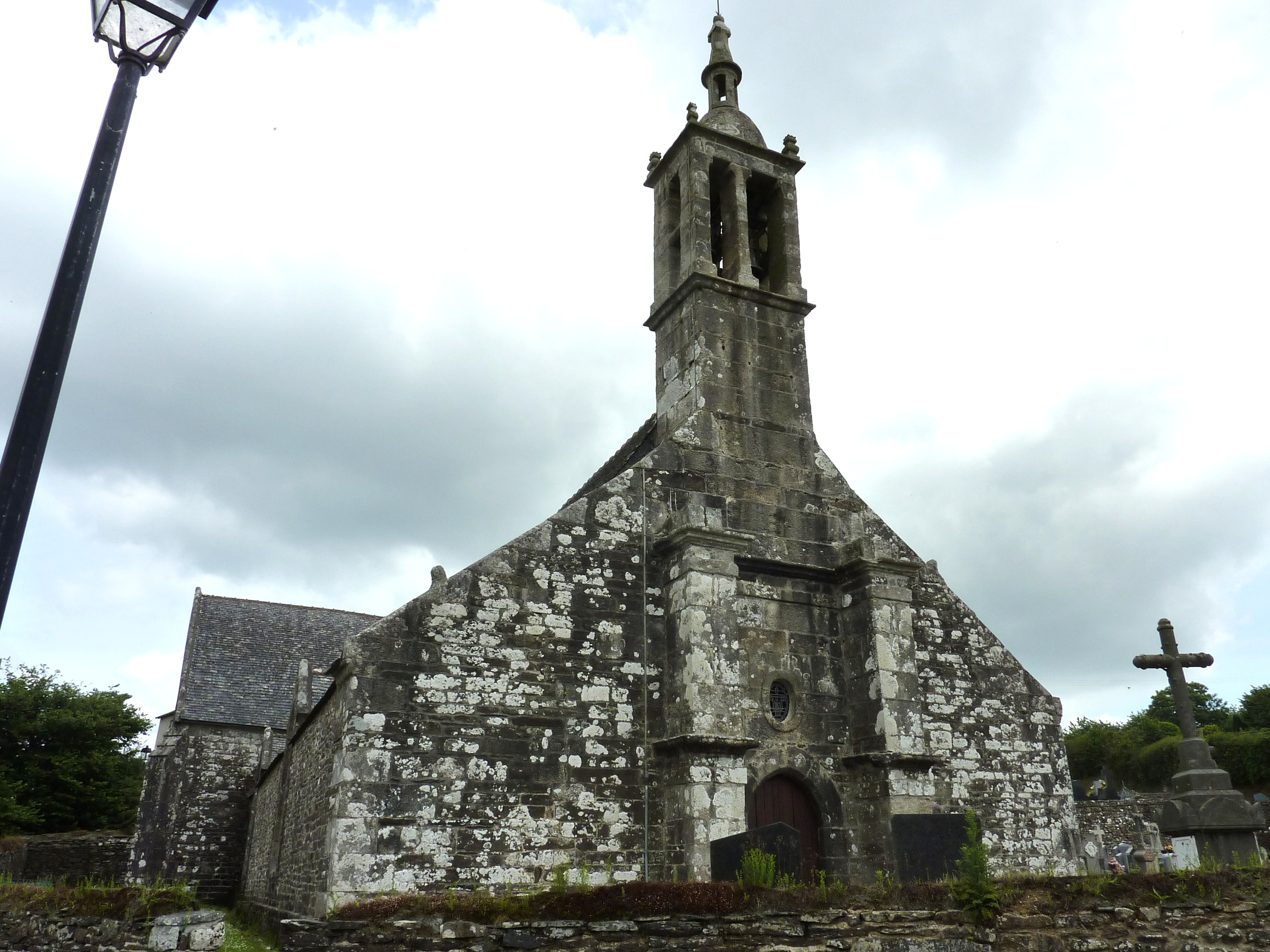
- The church of Saint-Edern, in Lannédern
- Location of Lannédern
- Location within France Location within Brittany
- Coordinates: 48°18′05″N 3°53′46″W
- Country: France
- Region: Brittany
- Department: Finistère
- Arrondissement: Châteaulin
- Canton: Briec
- Intercommunality: Pleyben-Châteaulin-Porzay

Government
  - Mayor (2020–2026): Pauline Caro
- Area^{1}: 12.43 km^{2} (4.80 sq mi)
- Highest elevation: 201 m (659 ft)
- Lowest elevation: 80 m (260 ft)
- Population (2023): 321
  - Density: 25.8/km^{2} (66.9/sq mi)
- Time zone: UTC+01:00 (CET)
  - Summer (DST): UTC+02:00 (CEST)
- INSEE/Postal code: 29115 /29190
- ^{1} French Land Register data, which excludes lakes, ponds, glaciers > 1 km^{2} (0.386 sq mi or 247 acres) and river estuaries.

Lannédern (French pronunciation: [lanedɛʁn]; Breton: Lannedern) is a commune in the Finistère department of Brittany in north-western France.

== Population ==
Historical population
Year	Pop.	±% p.a.
1968	477	—
1975	409	−2.17%
1982	361	−1.77%
1990	309	−1.93%
1999	272	−1.41%
2007	302	+1.32%
2012	317	+0.97%
2017	293	−1.56%
2023	321	+1.53%
Source: INSEE

== See also ==
- Communes of the Finistère department
- Roland Doré sculptor
- Lannédern Parish close
