= Château de Trévarez =

Stately home in Finistère, Brittany, France

Coordinates: 48°09′10″N 3°48′24″W

- Saint-Goazec, Finistère, Brittany in France
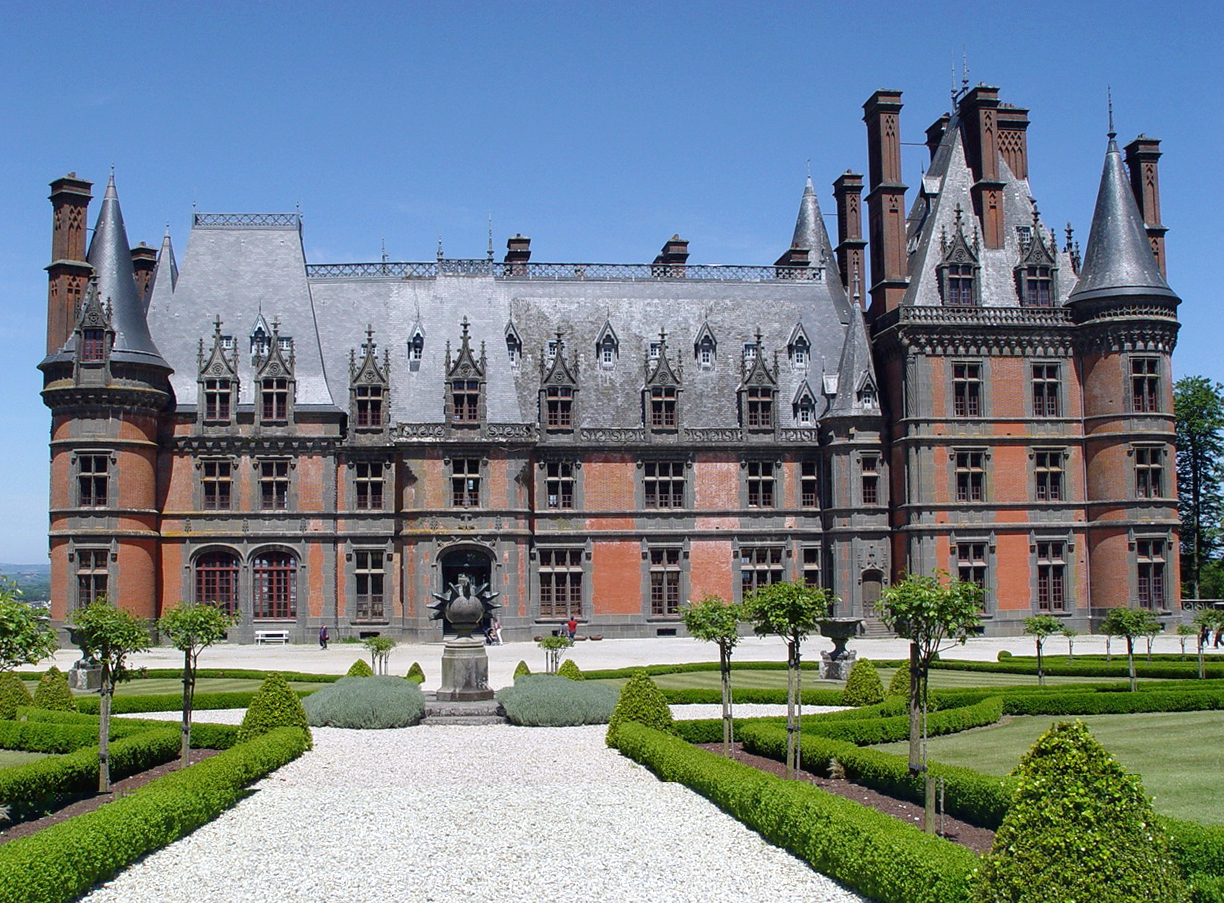
- Front view of Trévarez

Site information
- Type: Palace
- Owner: General Council of Finistère
- Controlled by: Monument historique
- Open to the public: Yes
- Condition: Good
- Website: Domaine de Trévarez

Location

Site history
- Built: 1893
- Built by: Walter-André Destailleur
- In use: 1907

The Château de Trévarez is a stately home in the commune of Saint-Goazec in Finistère, in Brittany, France.

The former manor house was built in the 16th century (the west part) and the 17th century (the east part). The present structure was commissioned by James de Kerjégu, Chairman of the General Council of Finistère, and built at the end of the 19th century by the French architect Walter-André Destailleur.

Trévarez is one of the most recent châteaux built in France. Construction was completed around the beginning of the twentieth century. In 1941, the château was taken over by the German occupying forces. The castle was bombed on 30 July 1944 by the Royal Air Force.

== Location and style ==
The château is located on a promontory overlooking the valley of the River Aulne, canalised as part of the Nantes-Brest Canal. Its architecture is a combination of traditional style and technological innovations.

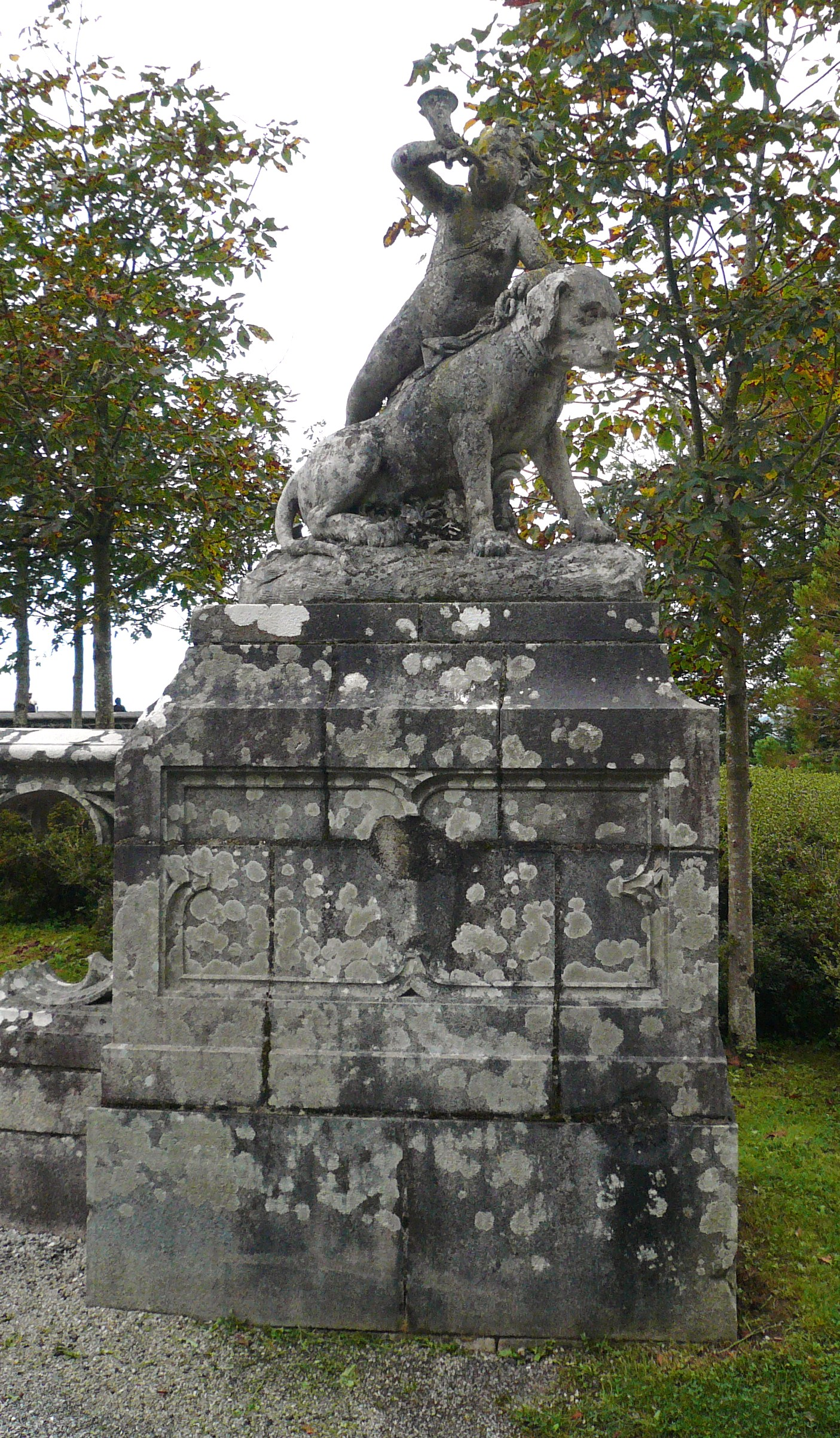
A statue on the terrace.

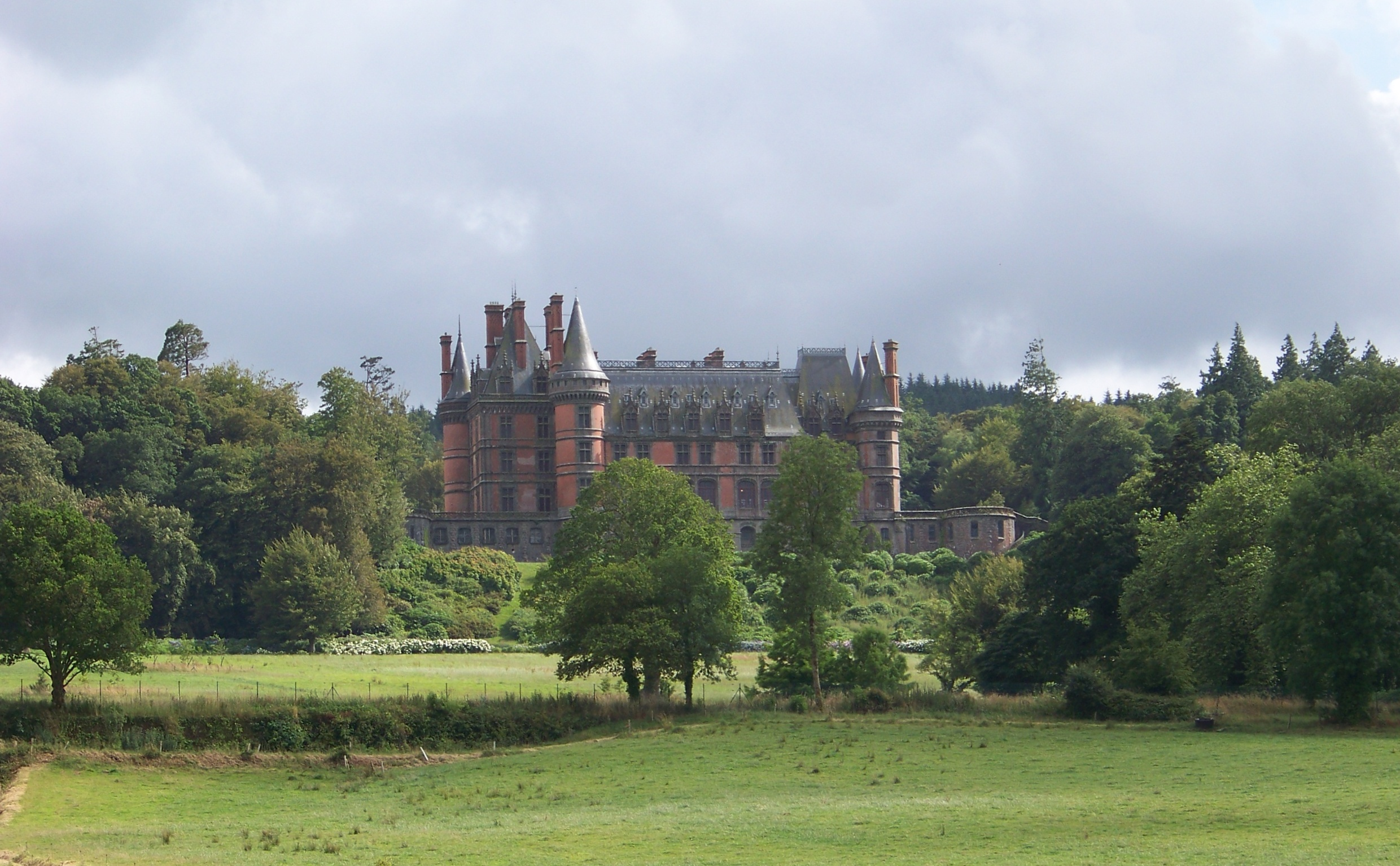
Château de Trévarez

== Protection ==
The château is partly listed as a monument historique by the French Ministry of Culture. The park and gardens are also listed on the Ministry's database and are open to the public.

== See also ==
- List of châteaux in Brittany
