= Edern, Finistère =

Edern Edern
- Commune
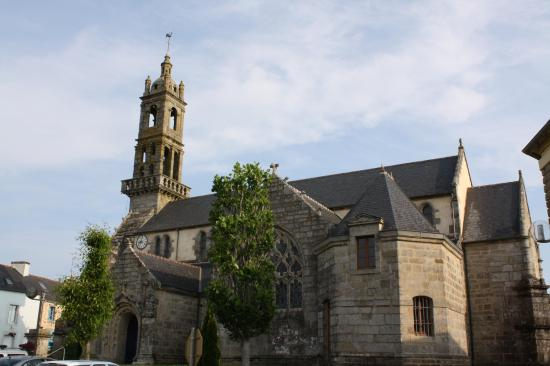
- The church in Edern
- Location of Edern
- Location within France Location within Brittany
- Coordinates: 48°06′14″N 3°58′33″W
- Country: France
- Region: Brittany
- Department: Finistère
- Arrondissement: Quimper
- Canton: Briec
- Intercommunality: Quimper Bretagne Occidentale

Government
  - Mayor (2020–2026): Jean-Paul Cozien
- Area^{1}: 39.98 km^{2} (15.44 sq mi)
- Highest elevation: 256 m (840 ft)
- Lowest elevation: 82 m (269 ft)
- Population (2023): 2,186
  - Density: 54.68/km^{2} (141.6/sq mi)
- Time zone: UTC+01:00 (CET)
  - Summer (DST): UTC+02:00 (CEST)
- INSEE/Postal code: 29048 /29510
- ^{1} French Land Register data, which excludes lakes, ponds, glaciers > 1 km^{2} (0.386 sq mi or 247 acres) and river estuaries.

Edern (French pronunciation: [edɛʁn]; Breton: Edern) is a commune in the Finistère department of Brittany in northwestern France.

== Geography ==
=== Climate ===
Edern has an oceanic climate (Köppen climate classification Cfb). The average annual temperature in Edern is 11.8 °C (53.2 °F). The average annual rainfall is 1,327.9 mm (52.28 in) with January as the wettest month. The temperatures are highest on average in August, at around 18.0 °C (64.4 °F), and lowest in January, at around 6.5 °C (43.7 °F). The highest temperature ever recorded in Edern was 38.0 °C (100.4 °F) on 9 August 2003; the coldest temperature ever recorded was −10.5 °C (13.1 °F) on 2 January 1997.

Climate data for Edern (1981–2010 averages, extremes 1989−2016)
| Month | Jan | Feb | Mar | Apr | May | Jun | Jul | Aug | Sep | Oct | Nov | Dec | Year |
|---|---|---|---|---|---|---|---|---|---|---|---|---|---|
| Record high °C (°F) | 17.0 (62.6) | 19.0 (66.2) | 25.0 (77.0) | 28.7 (83.7) | 31.8 (89.2) | 34.5 (94.1) | 36.6 (97.9) | 38.0 (100.4) | 31.5 (88.7) | 29.5 (85.1) | 21.6 (70.9) | 16.7 (62.1) | 38.0 (100.4) |
| Mean daily maximum °C (°F) | 9.3 (48.7) | 10.3 (50.5) | 12.6 (54.7) | 14.7 (58.5) | 18.5 (65.3) | 21.3 (70.3) | 22.6 (72.7) | 23.1 (73.6) | 20.8 (69.4) | 16.6 (61.9) | 12.4 (54.3) | 9.6 (49.3) | 16.0 (60.8) |
| Daily mean °C (°F) | 6.5 (43.7) | 6.9 (44.4) | 8.6 (47.5) | 10.2 (50.4) | 13.6 (56.5) | 16.1 (61.0) | 17.7 (63.9) | 18.0 (64.4) | 15.7 (60.3) | 12.7 (54.9) | 9.1 (48.4) | 6.6 (43.9) | 11.8 (53.2) |
| Mean daily minimum °C (°F) | 3.6 (38.5) | 3.5 (38.3) | 4.7 (40.5) | 5.6 (42.1) | 8.6 (47.5) | 10.9 (51.6) | 12.7 (54.9) | 12.9 (55.2) | 10.6 (51.1) | 8.9 (48.0) | 5.9 (42.6) | 3.6 (38.5) | 7.6 (45.7) |
| Record low °C (°F) | −10.5 (13.1) | −9.5 (14.9) | −6.4 (20.5) | −2.0 (28.4) | −1.0 (30.2) | 2.5 (36.5) | 5.0 (41.0) | 6.0 (42.8) | 2.0 (35.6) | −1.5 (29.3) | −3.7 (25.3) | −7.5 (18.5) | −10.5 (13.1) |
| Average precipitation mm (inches) | 160.9 (6.33) | 132.8 (5.23) | 96.7 (3.81) | 101.2 (3.98) | 83.6 (3.29) | 65.7 (2.59) | 78.3 (3.08) | 72.4 (2.85) | 88.0 (3.46) | 135.0 (5.31) | 153.2 (6.03) | 160.1 (6.30) | 1,327.9 (52.28) |
| Average precipitation days (≥ 1.0 mm) | 16.6 | 14.0 | 13.6 | 13.5 | 10.8 | 9.4 | 11.4 | 10.1 | 10.7 | 15.1 | 17.2 | 15.9 | 158.2 |
Source: Meteociel

== Population ==
Inhabitants of Edern are called in French Édernois.

Historical population
| Year | Pop. | ±% p.a. |
|---|---|---|
| 1968 | 1,567 | — |
| 1975 | 1,590 | +0.21% |
| 1982 | 1,690 | +0.88% |
| 1990 | 1,759 | +0.50% |
| 1999 | 1,804 | +0.28% |
| 2007 | 2,021 | +1.43% |
| 2012 | 2,170 | +1.43% |
| 2017 | 2,224 | +0.49% |
| 2023 | 2,186 | −0.29% |
Source: INSEE

== See also ==
- Communes of the Finistère department
