= Édouard Le Jeune =

French politician (1921–2017)

- Born: 20 February 1921; Berrien, Finistère, France
- Died: 9 April 2017 (aged 96); Dinéault, Finistère, France
- Occupation: Politician
- Political party: Union of Democrats and Independents – UC; Union for French Democracy
- Spouse: Marie-Thérèse Le Jeune

Édouard Le Jeune (French pronunciation: [edwaʁ lə ʒœn]; 20 February 1921 – 9 April 2017) was a French World War II veteran and politician. He was the mayor of Dinéault from 1953 to 1989, and a senator for Finistère from 1971 to 1998. He was the founding president of the Parc naturel régional d'Armorique.

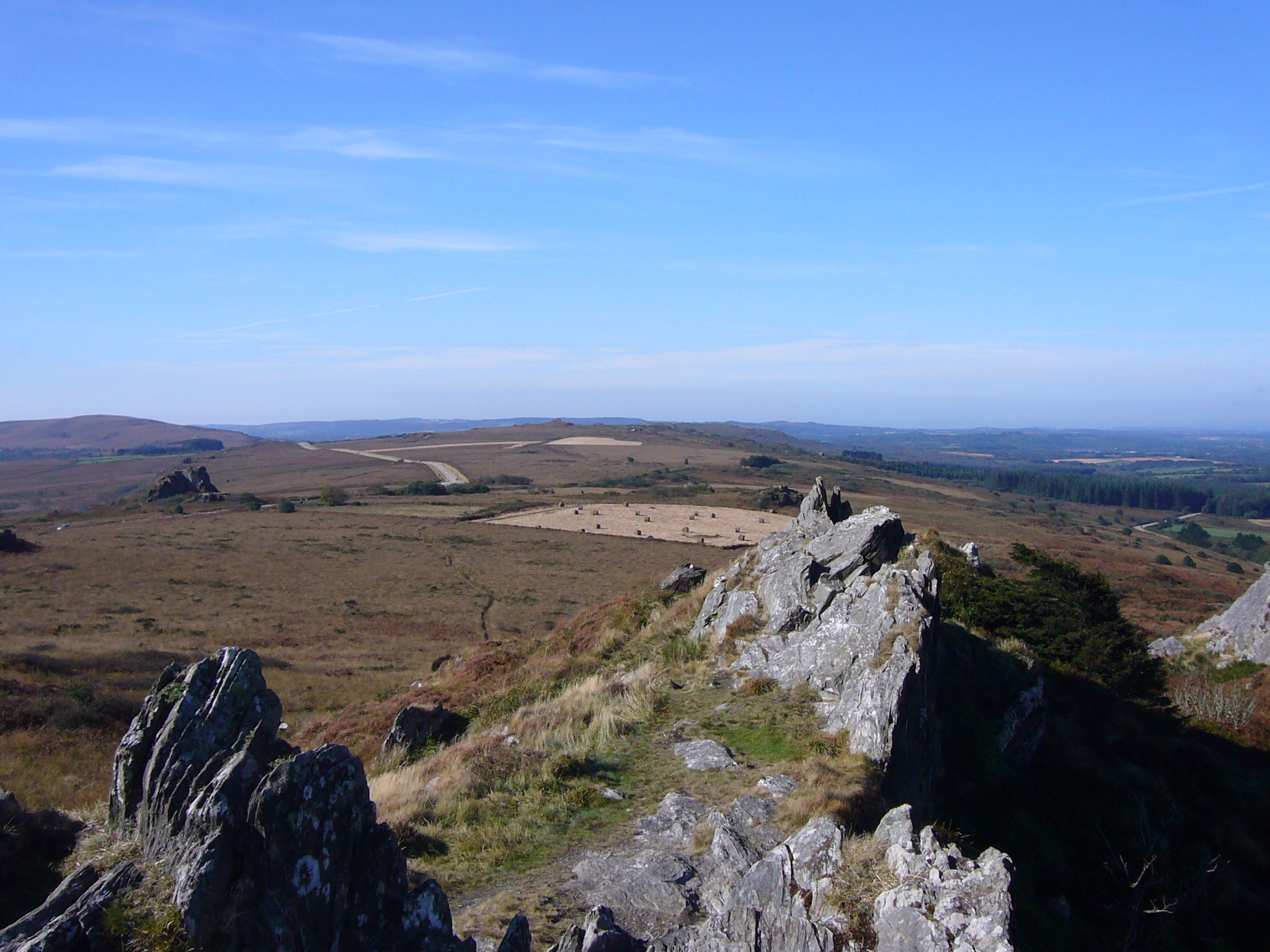
View of the Parc naturel régional d'Armorique, founded by Le Jeune in 1969.

== Early life ==
Édouard Le Jeune was born on 20 February 1921 in Berrien, France. In 1943, after the Germans had invaded France during World War II, he joined the French Resistance. After the war, he was awarded the Resistance Medal and the Cross of the resistance volunteer combatant.

== Career ==
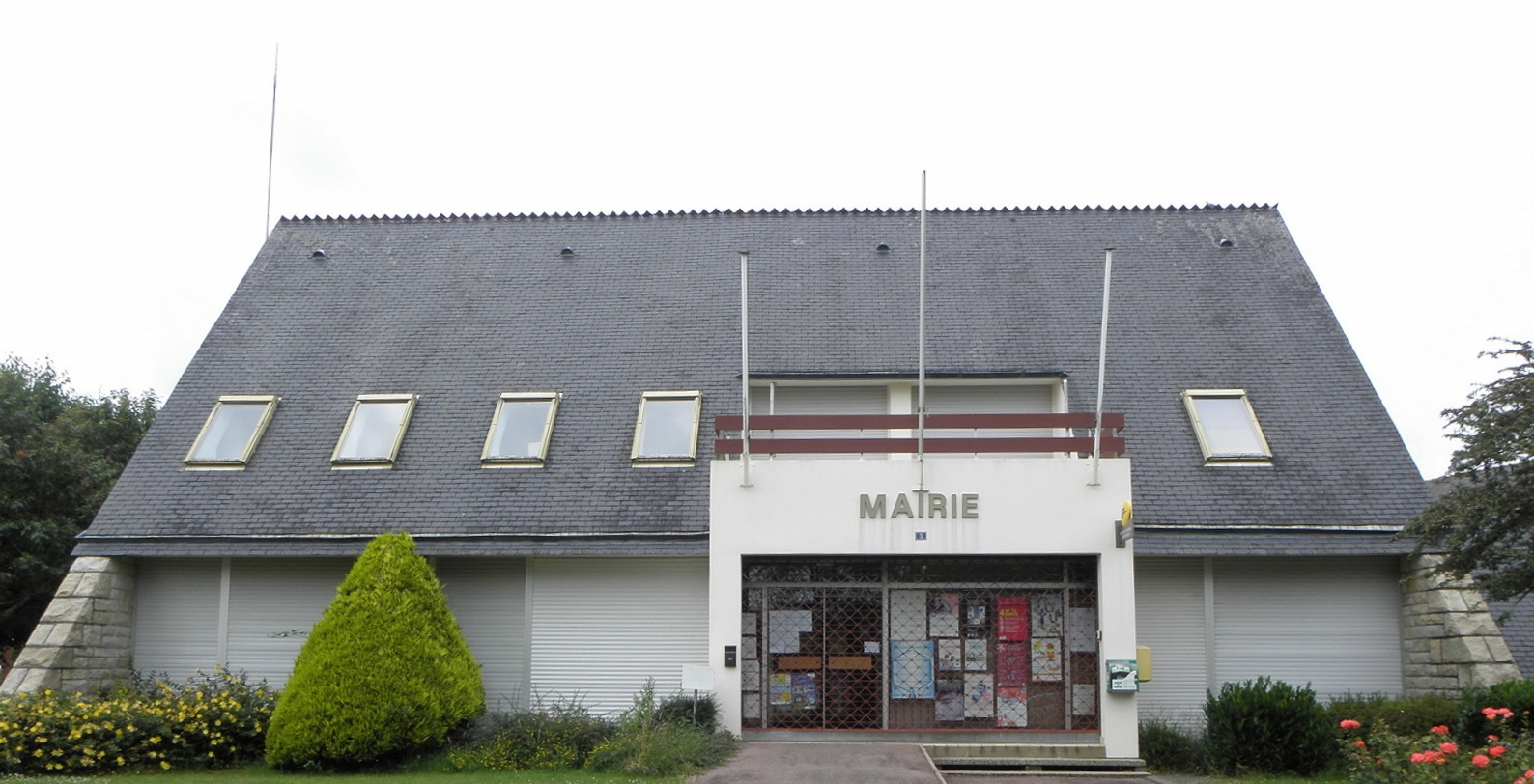
The new townhall of Dinéault, dedicated by Le Jeune in 1979.

Le Jeune first joined the Union of Democrats and Independents – UC, and later the Union for French Democracy. He served as the mayor of Dinéault from 1953 to 1989. He dedicated a new townhall in 1979. He established the Parc naturel régional d'Armorique in 1969, and he served as its founding president. He served as a member of the French Senate, where he represented Finistère from 1971 to 1998.

Le Jeune received the Legion of Honour in 1999.

== Personal life and death ==
Le Jeune married a native of Dinéault, Marie-Thérèse, in 1951. He died on 9 April 2017 in Dinéault. His funeral was held at the Church in Dinéault on 13 April 2017.
