= Locmaria (disambiguation) =

Locmaria may refer to several places in France:

- Locmaria, a commune in the Morbihan department
- Locmaria-Grand-Champ, a commune in the Morbihan department
- Locmaria-Berrien, a commune in the Finistère department
- Locmaria-Plouzané, a commune in the Finistère department
