= Plonévez-Porzay =

Plonévez-Porzay Plonevez-Porzhe
- Commune
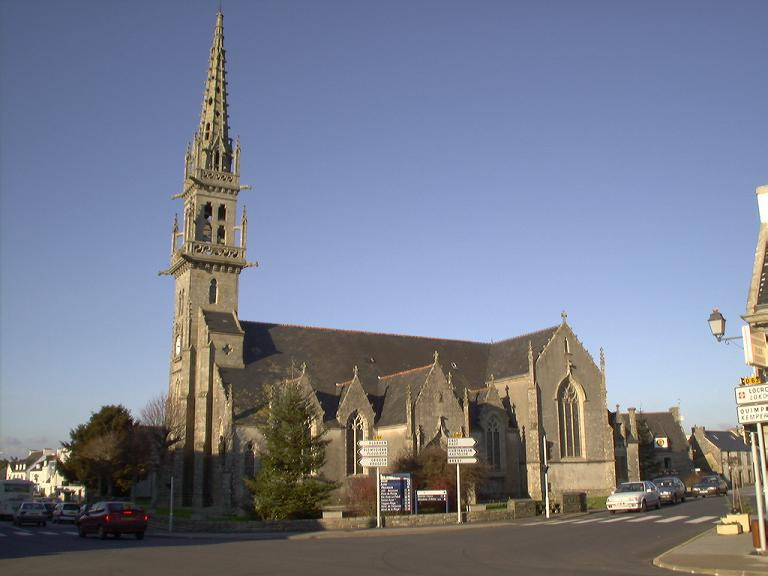
- The church in Plonévez-Porzay

- Coat of arms
- Location of Plonévez-Porzay
- Location within France Location within Brittany
- Coordinates: 48°07′35″N 4°13′07″W
- Country: France
- Region: Brittany
- Department: Finistère
- Arrondissement: Châteaulin
- Canton: Crozon
- Intercommunality: Pleyben-Châteaulin-Porzay

Government
  - Mayor (2020–2026): Paul Divanac'h
- Area^{1}: 29.23 km^{2} (11.29 sq mi)
- Highest elevation: 126 m (413 ft)
- Lowest elevation: 0 m (0 ft)
- Population (2023): 1,781
  - Density: 60.93/km^{2} (157.8/sq mi)
- Time zone: UTC+01:00 (CET)
  - Summer (DST): UTC+02:00 (CEST)
- INSEE/Postal code: 29176 /29550
- ^{1} French Land Register data, which excludes lakes, ponds, glaciers > 1 km^{2} (0.386 sq mi or 247 acres) and river estuaries.

Plonévez-Porzay (French pronunciation: [plɔneve pɔʁzɛ]; Breton: Plonevez-Porzhe) is a commune in the Finistère department of Brittany in north-western France.

== Population ==
Inhabitants of Plonévez-Porzay are called in French Plonévéziens.

Historical population
Year	Pop.	±% p.a.
1968	1,527	—
1975	1,533	+0.06%
1982	1,643	+0.99%
1990	1,663	+0.15%
1999	1,582	−0.55%
2007	1,666	+0.65%
2012	1,794	+1.49%
2017	1,758	−0.40%
2023	1,781	+0.22%
Source: INSEE

== See also ==
- Communes of the Finistère department
