= Canton of Crozon =

French administrative division

Coordinates: 48.25°N 4.49°W

The canton of Crozon is an administrative division of the Finistère department, northwestern France. Its borders were modified at the French canton reorganisation which came into effect in March 2015. Its seat is in Crozon.

It consists of the following communes:

1. Argol
2. Camaret-sur-Mer
3. Cast
4. Châteaulin
5. Crozon
6. Dinéault
7. Landévennec
8. Lanvéoc
9. Ploéven
10. Plomodiern
11. Plonévez-Porzay
12. Port-Launay
13. Quéménéven
14. Roscanvel
15. Saint-Coulitz
16. Saint-Nic
17. Telgruc-sur-Mer
18. Trégarvan
