= Cast, Finistère =

Cast Kast
- Commune
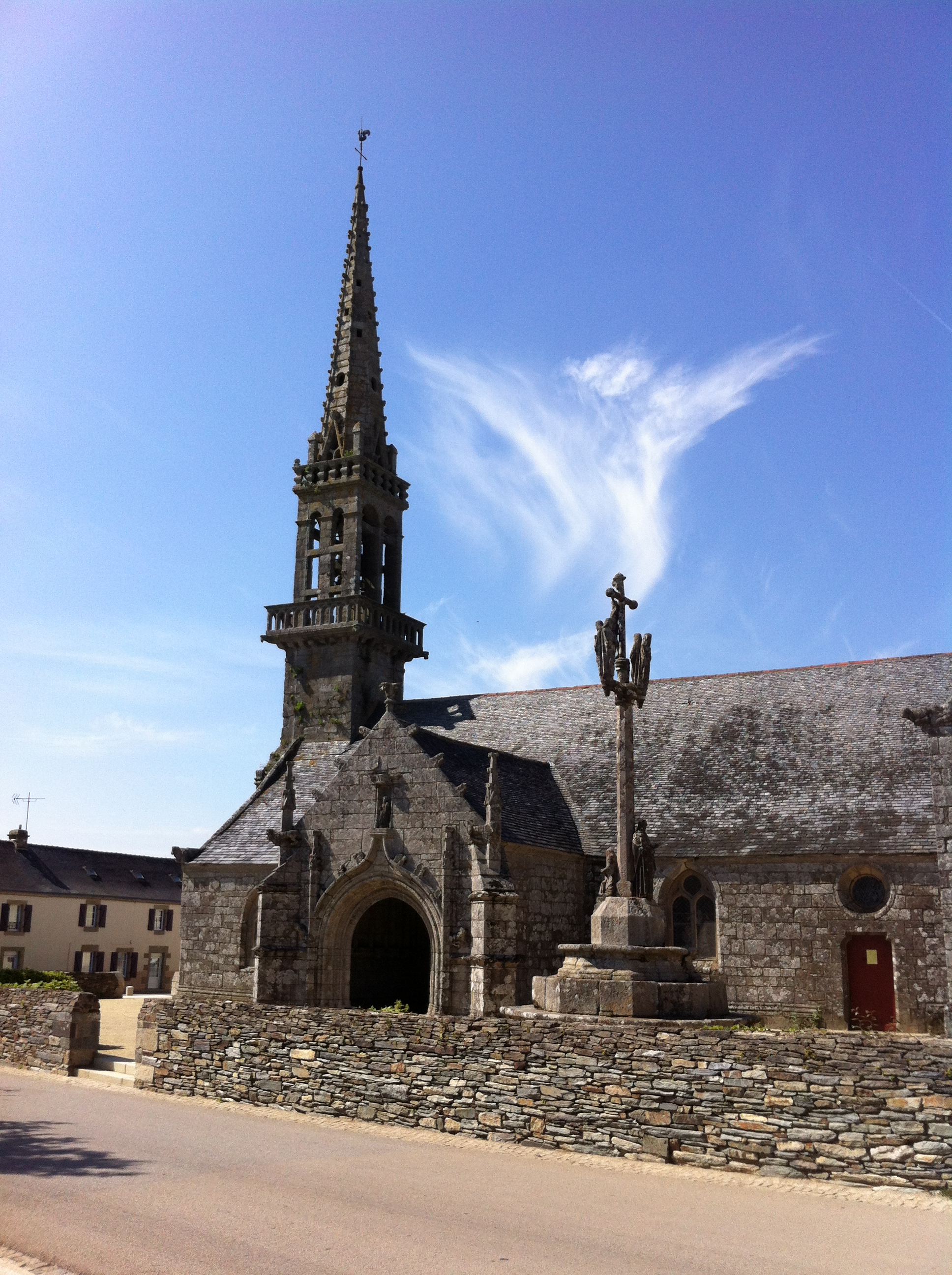
- The parish church of Saint-Jérôme, in Cast
- Location of Cast
- Location within France Location within Brittany
- Coordinates: 48°09′29″N 4°08′18″W
- Country: France
- Region: Brittany
- Department: Finistère
- Arrondissement: Châteaulin
- Canton: Crozon
- Intercommunality: Pleyben-Châteaulin-Porzay

Government
  - Mayor (2020–2026): Jacques Gouérou
- Area^{1}: 37.66 km^{2} (14.54 sq mi)
- Highest elevation: 252 m (827 ft)
- Lowest elevation: 44 m (144 ft)
- Population (2023): 1,570
  - Density: 41.7/km^{2} (108/sq mi)
- Time zone: UTC+01:00 (CET)
  - Summer (DST): UTC+02:00 (CEST)
- INSEE/Postal code: 29025 /29150
- ^{1} French Land Register data, which excludes lakes, ponds, glaciers > 1 km^{2} (0.386 sq mi or 247 acres) and river estuaries.

Cast (French pronunciation: [kast]; Breton: Kast) is a commune in the Finistère department of Brittany in north-western France.

== Population ==
Inhabitants of Cast are called in French Castois.

== See also ==
- Communes of the Finistère department
- Roland Doré sculptor
