= Lanvéoc =

Lanvéoc Lañveog
- Commune
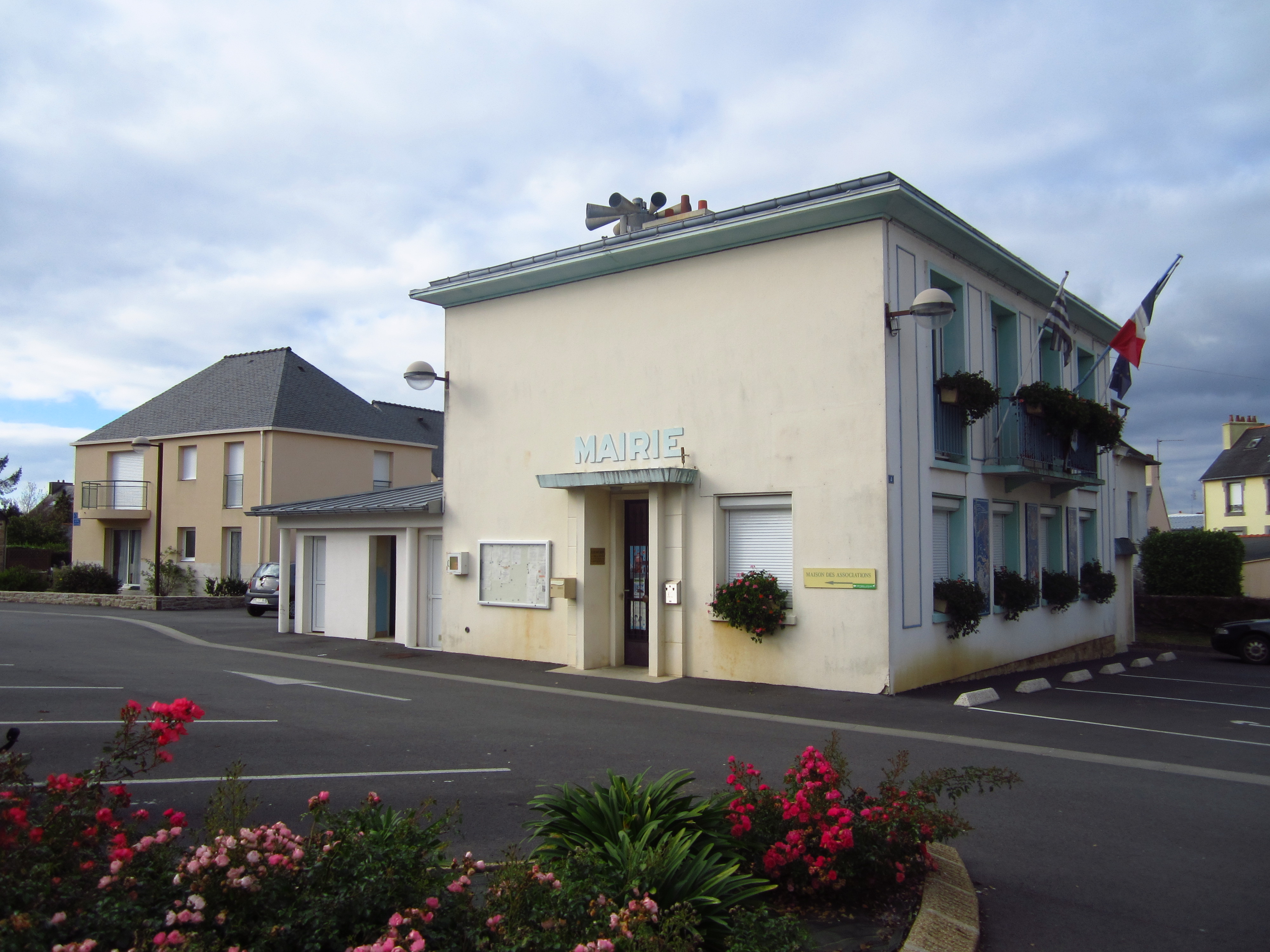
- The town hall in Lanvéoc

- Coat of arms
- Location of Lanvéoc
- Location within France Location within Brittany
- Coordinates: 48°17′12″N 4°27′39″W
- Country: France
- Region: Brittany
- Department: Finistère
- Arrondissement: Châteaulin
- Canton: Crozon
- Intercommunality: Presqu'île de Crozon-Aulne maritime

Government
  - Mayor (2020–2026): Christine Lastennet
- Area^{1}: 19.21 km^{2} (7.42 sq mi)
- Highest elevation: 87 m (285 ft)
- Lowest elevation: 0 m (0 ft)
- Population (2023): 2,044
  - Density: 106.4/km^{2} (275.6/sq mi)
- Time zone: UTC+01:00 (CET)
  - Summer (DST): UTC+02:00 (CEST)
- INSEE/Postal code: 29120 /29160
- ^{1} French Land Register data, which excludes lakes, ponds, glaciers > 1 km^{2} (0.386 sq mi or 247 acres) and river estuaries.

Lanvéoc (French pronunciation: [lɑ̃veɔk]; Breton: Lañveog) is a commune in the Finistère department of Brittany in north-western France. The École Navale, the French naval academy, is located here.

== Climate ==
Lanvéoc has an oceanic climate (Köppen climate classification Cfb). The average annual temperature in Lanvéoc is 12.2 °C (54.0 °F). The average annual rainfall is 1,030.1 mm (40.56 in) with December as the wettest month. The temperatures are highest on average in August, at around 17.5 °C (63.5 °F), and lowest in January and February, at around 7.5 °C (45.5 °F). The highest temperature ever recorded in Lanvéoc was 37.3 °C (99.1 °F) on 18 July 2022; the coldest temperature ever recorded was −12.5 °C (9.5 °F) on 21 February 1948.

Comparison of local Meteorological data with other cities in France
Town	Sunshine (hours/yr)	Rain (mm/yr)	Snow (days/yr)	Storm (days/yr)	Fog (days/yr)
National average	1,973	770	14	22	40
Lanvéoc	1,692.2	1,008.1	4.2	6.5	34.4
Paris	1,661	637	12	18	10
Nice	2,724	767	1	29	1
Strasbourg	1,693	665	29	29	56
Brest	1,605	1,211	7	12	75

Climate data for Lanvéoc (1991–2020 normals, extremes 1948–present)
Month	Jan	Feb	Mar	Apr	May	Jun	Jul	Aug	Sep	Oct	Nov	Dec	Year
Record high °C (°F)	15.7 (60.3)	20.1 (68.2)	24.4 (75.9)	27.3 (81.1)	29.0 (84.2)	34.5 (94.1)	37.3 (99.1)	35.2 (95.4)	32.5 (90.5)	28.0 (82.4)	20.5 (68.9)	17.9 (64.2)	37.3 (99.1)
Mean daily maximum °C (°F)	9.8 (49.6)	10.1 (50.2)	12.0 (53.6)	14.1 (57.4)	16.8 (62.2)	19.2 (66.6)	20.9 (69.6)	21.0 (69.8)	19.5 (67.1)	16.1 (61.0)	12.7 (54.9)	10.5 (50.9)	15.2 (59.4)
Daily mean °C (°F)	7.5 (45.5)	7.5 (45.5)	9.0 (48.2)	10.6 (51.1)	13.2 (55.8)	15.7 (60.3)	17.4 (63.3)	17.5 (63.5)	16.0 (60.8)	13.3 (55.9)	10.3 (50.5)	8.2 (46.8)	12.2 (54.0)
Mean daily minimum °C (°F)	5.2 (41.4)	4.8 (40.6)	5.9 (42.6)	7.1 (44.8)	9.7 (49.5)	12.1 (53.8)	13.8 (56.8)	14.0 (57.2)	12.5 (54.5)	10.5 (50.9)	7.9 (46.2)	5.9 (42.6)	9.1 (48.4)
Record low °C (°F)	−10.8 (12.6)	−12.5 (9.5)	−4.6 (23.7)	−1.3 (29.7)	0.8 (33.4)	4.3 (39.7)	6.8 (44.2)	7.4 (45.3)	4.8 (40.6)	0.6 (33.1)	−2.1 (28.2)	−7.2 (19.0)	−12.5 (9.5)
Average precipitation mm (inches)	118.1 (4.65)	97.8 (3.85)	71.8 (2.83)	75.2 (2.96)	61.3 (2.41)	55.6 (2.19)	57.3 (2.26)	61.8 (2.43)	69.8 (2.75)	108.0 (4.25)	126.9 (5.00)	126.5 (4.98)	1,030.1 (40.56)
Average precipitation days (≥ 1.0 mm)	16.3	14.2	12.7	12.0	9.7	8.7	9.1	8.8	9.8	14.1	16.7	16.9	148.9
Mean monthly sunshine hours	61.4	81.1	124.3	163.6	191.9	207.6	193.5	190.4	174.7	111.9	70.7	64.5	1,635.5
Source 1: Météo France
Source 2: Meteociel

== Population ==
Inhabitants of Lanvéoc are called in French Lanvéociens.

Historical population
Year	Pop.	±% p.a.
1968	1,964	—
1975	1,957	−0.05%
1982	1,945	−0.09%
1990	1,857	−0.58%
1999	1,876	+0.11%
2007	2,220	+2.13%
2012	2,224	+0.04%
2017	2,095	−1.19%
2023	2,044	−0.41%
Source: INSEE

== See also ==
- Communes of the Finistère department
- Parc naturel régional d'Armorique
