= Argol, Finistère =

Argol Argol
- Commune
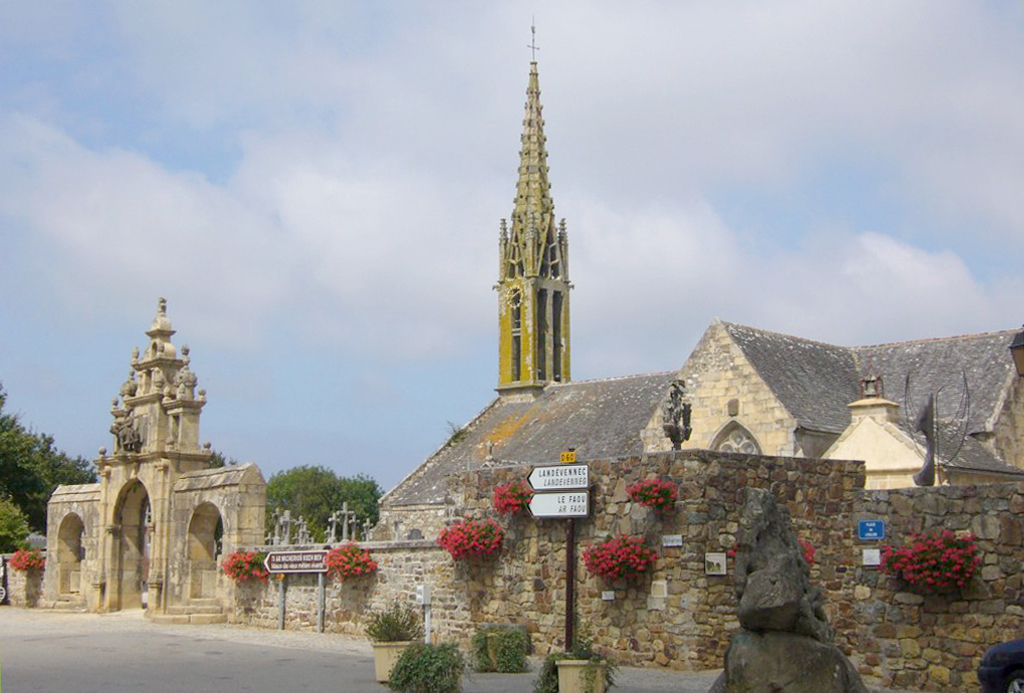
- Town square and parish church

- Coat of arms
- Location of Argol
- Location within France Location within Brittany
- Coordinates: 48°14′47″N 4°18′55″W
- Country: France
- Region: Brittany
- Department: Finistère
- Arrondissement: Châteaulin
- Canton: Crozon
- Intercommunality: CC Presqu'île Crozon-Aulne Maritime

Government
  - Mayor (2020–2026): Henri Le Pape
- Area^{1}: 31.73 km^{2} (12.25 sq mi)
- Population (2023): 1,065
  - Density: 33.56/km^{2} (86.93/sq mi)
- Time zone: UTC+01:00 (CET)
  - Summer (DST): UTC+02:00 (CEST)
- INSEE/Postal code: 29001 /29560
- ^{1} French Land Register data, which excludes lakes, ponds, glaciers > 1 km^{2} (0.386 sq mi or 247 acres) and river estuaries.

Argol (French pronunciation: [aʁɡɔl]; Breton: Argol) is a commune in the Finistère department and administrative region of Brittany in north-western France.

== Population ==
Historical population
Year	Pop.	±% p.a.
1968	819	—
1975	766	−0.95%
1982	700	−1.28%
1990	698	−0.04%
1999	746	+0.74%
2007	802	+0.91%
2012	996	+4.43%
2017	991	−0.10%
2023	1,065	+1.21%
Source: INSEE

In French the inhabitants of Argol are known as Argoliens.

== See also ==
- Communes of the Finistère department
- Parc naturel régional d'Armorique
- Argol Parish close
