= Argol Parish close =

Coordinates: 48.2464°N 4.3170°W

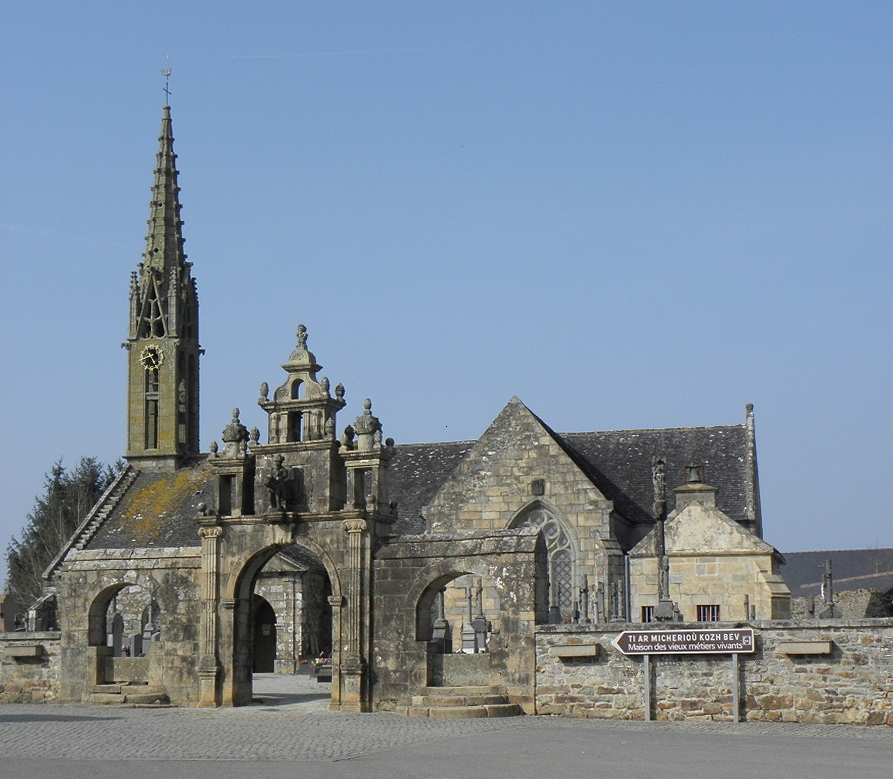
The parish church at Argol

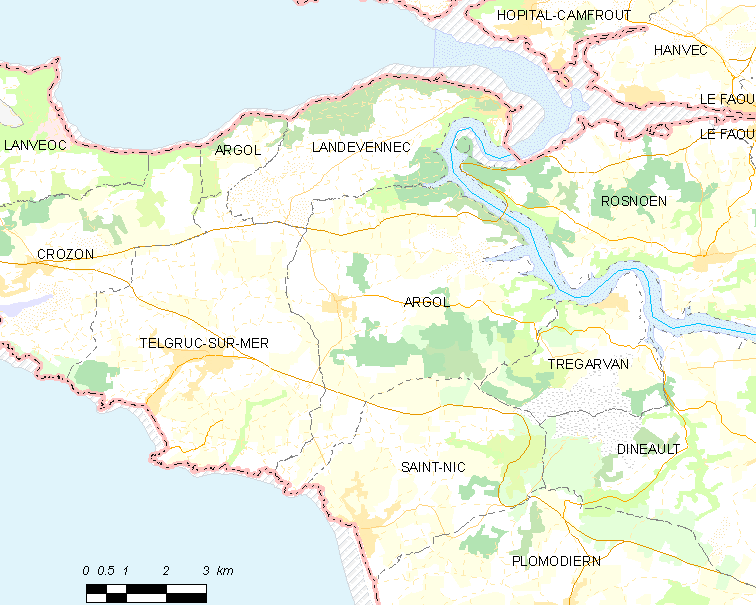
Map showing the location of Argol

The Argol Parish close (Enclos paroissial), including the Église Saint-Pierre et Saint-Paul, is located in Argol in the arrondissement of Châteaulin in Finistère in Brittany in north-western France. The parish church of Saint Peter and Saint Paul was built in 1575, restored in 1617 and enlarged in 1674. In 1784, the side walls were completely reconstructed as was the porch in 1839. The lintel of the belfry on the west gable of the church records the date 1582, Both the church and the "arc de triomphe" were listed as historical monument in 1914. The church is also associated with Saint Geneviève who was nominated as the secondary patron in 1634. Records show that there was a priory run from the Benedictine abbey at Landévennec in the Middle Ages.

In Breton, Argol means "in danger of dying" and legend has it that it was here that King Gradlon's daughter Dahut died when the legendary city of Ys was engulfed by the sea.

== The ossuary ==
This ossuary is an arcaded building, was built in the Renaissance style in 1665 and restored in 1922 and 1981. The building's decoration includes a stoup.

== The monumental entrance ==
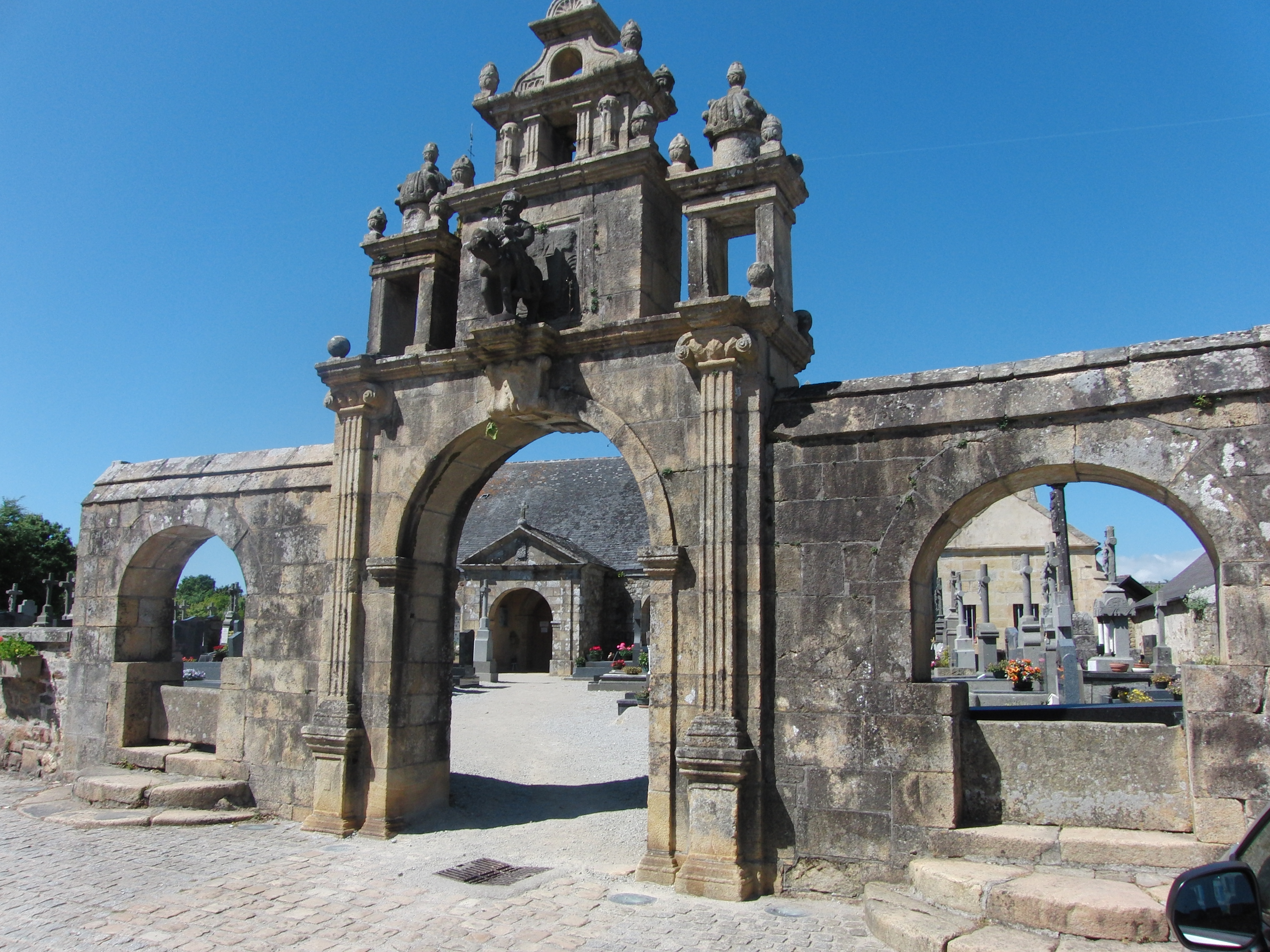
The entrance to the Argol cemetery

The "arc de triomphe" style entrance to the enclos' cemetery has a semicircular central arch with fluted pilasters with ionic capitals, flanked by two semicircular side arches, above which are square turrets and a pediment inscribed with the date '1659'. In front of the pediment is a small equestrian statue of King Gradlon and at the very top of the pediment there is a bust of Saint Clément, one of the patrons of the parish.

== The statue of King Gradlon ==
There is a 3 metre high equestrian statue just outside the enclos which depicts King Gradlon and celebrates the Breton legend of the city of Ys. On the right side of the monument there is an account of the legend from a Christian point of view and on the left the pagan version is given.

== The calvary ==
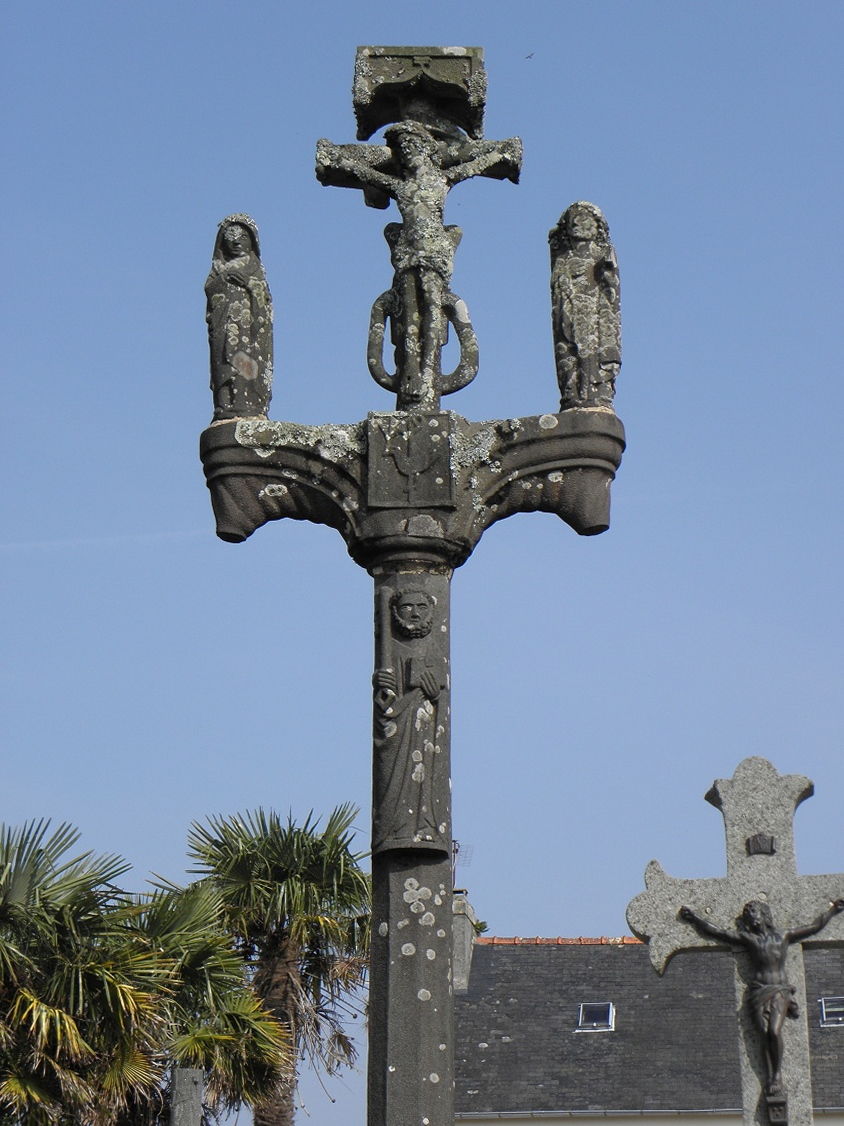
The calvary at Argol

The Argol calvary was built in 1593 and is 4.50 metres in height. It is carved from kersanton stone and stands on a granite base in the enclos' cemetery. The pedestal carries references to

" L’AN 1909 MISSION. L’AN 1891 MISSION. L’AN 1593 POSEE. L’AN 1891 RESTAUREE"

The octagonal shaft carries a statue of either Saint Peter or Saint Clément and above his head an escutcheon carries the depiction of a dove who holds a twig in his beak. This was the coat of arms of Abbot Briant, the Abbot of Landévennec from 1608 to 1632. The crosspiece also bears the arms of abbot Tanguy and an inscription reading "IAN GVEN-QUALEC, Y. GAL 1617". On the crosspiece and on either side of the depiction of Jesus on the cross are statues of the Virgin Mary, her hands clasped and her eyes tearful (she is back to back with a statue depicting an apostle) and John the Evangelist whose head is turned slightly towards Jesus. He is paired back to back with a female saint. On the reverse of Jesus on the cross is a depiction of him seated on a globe, his hands raised. He wears a sash bearing the words "GARDE QU’IL FERA LE ROY ESTANT JUGERA". To his right an angel blows on a trumpet and on his left a supplicant wrapped in a shroud stands awaiting judgement, his eyes closed. At the foot of the calvary is a small kersanton stone altar added in 1617.

== Statues of Saint Peter and Saint Paul ==
There are 17th-century statues of both these saints in the sanctuary.

== The master altar ==
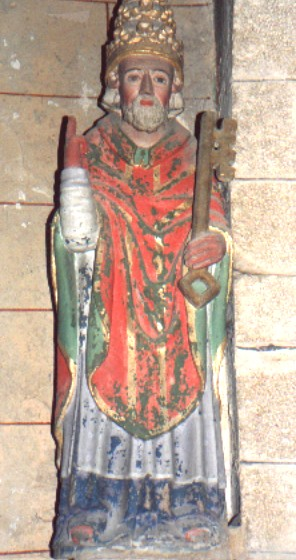
Statue of Saint Peter

This includes a stained glass window dedicated to Saint Peter and a 1.20m statue of Saint Peter carved from wood and dating to the 16th century. He holds an open book in one hand and a key in the other.

== The altarpiece dedicated to Saint Geneviève ==
This 17th century work in wood depicts Saint Geneviève with statues of Saint Corentin and the Virgin Mary with child.

== Other stained glass ==
The church also has a stained glass window dedicated to Saint Geneviève. It depicts her caring for her flock of sheep and around her are ten tableaux showing scenes from her life.

== Painting depicting Saint Louis ==
Louis IX of France is depicted wearing an ermine cape. In his right hand he holds the crown of thorns and in his left hand three nails.

== Statue of John the Evangelist ==
This statue carved from wood dates to the 17th century. John holds a cross and a book.

== Gallery of images ==
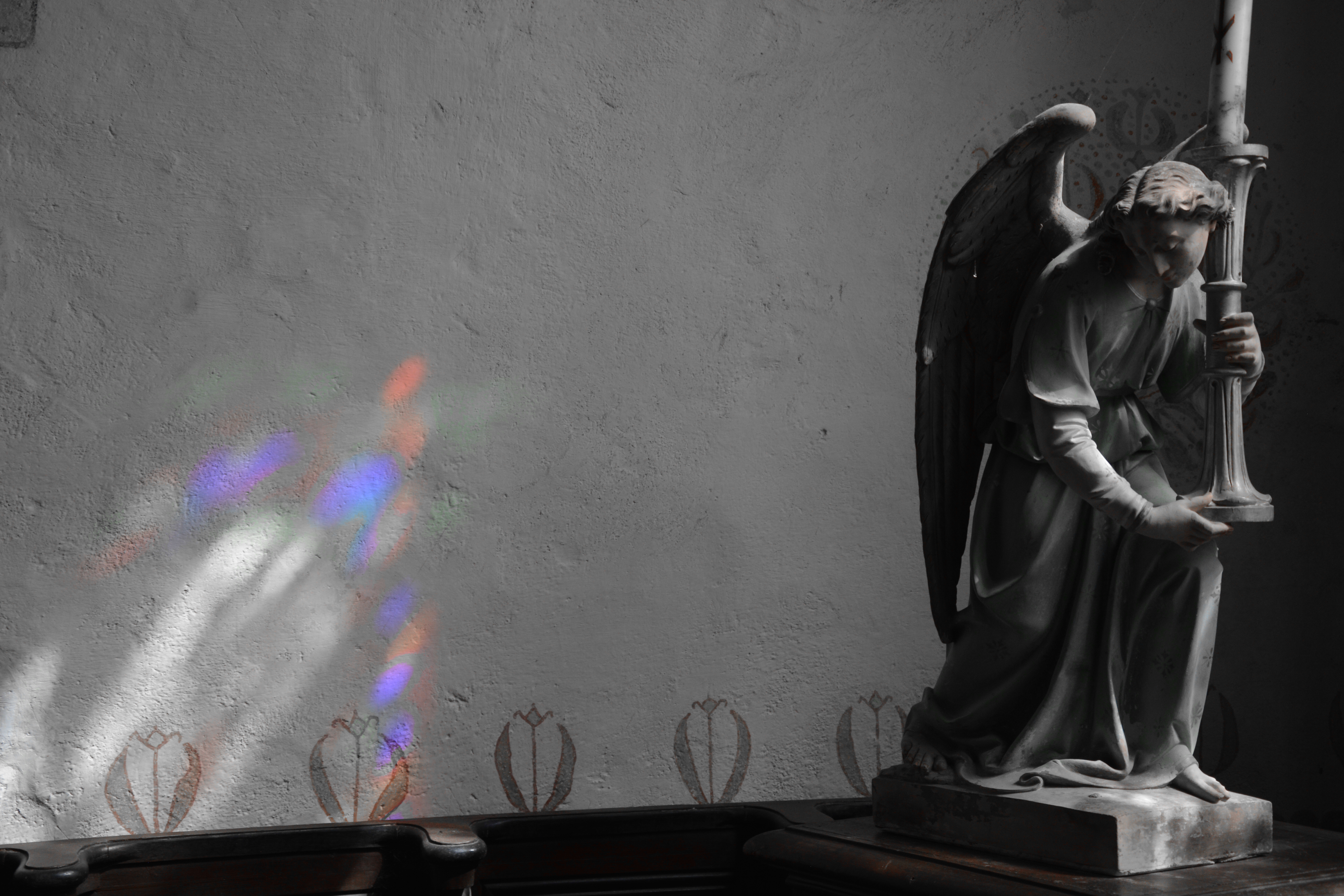
Gralon on the monumental arch

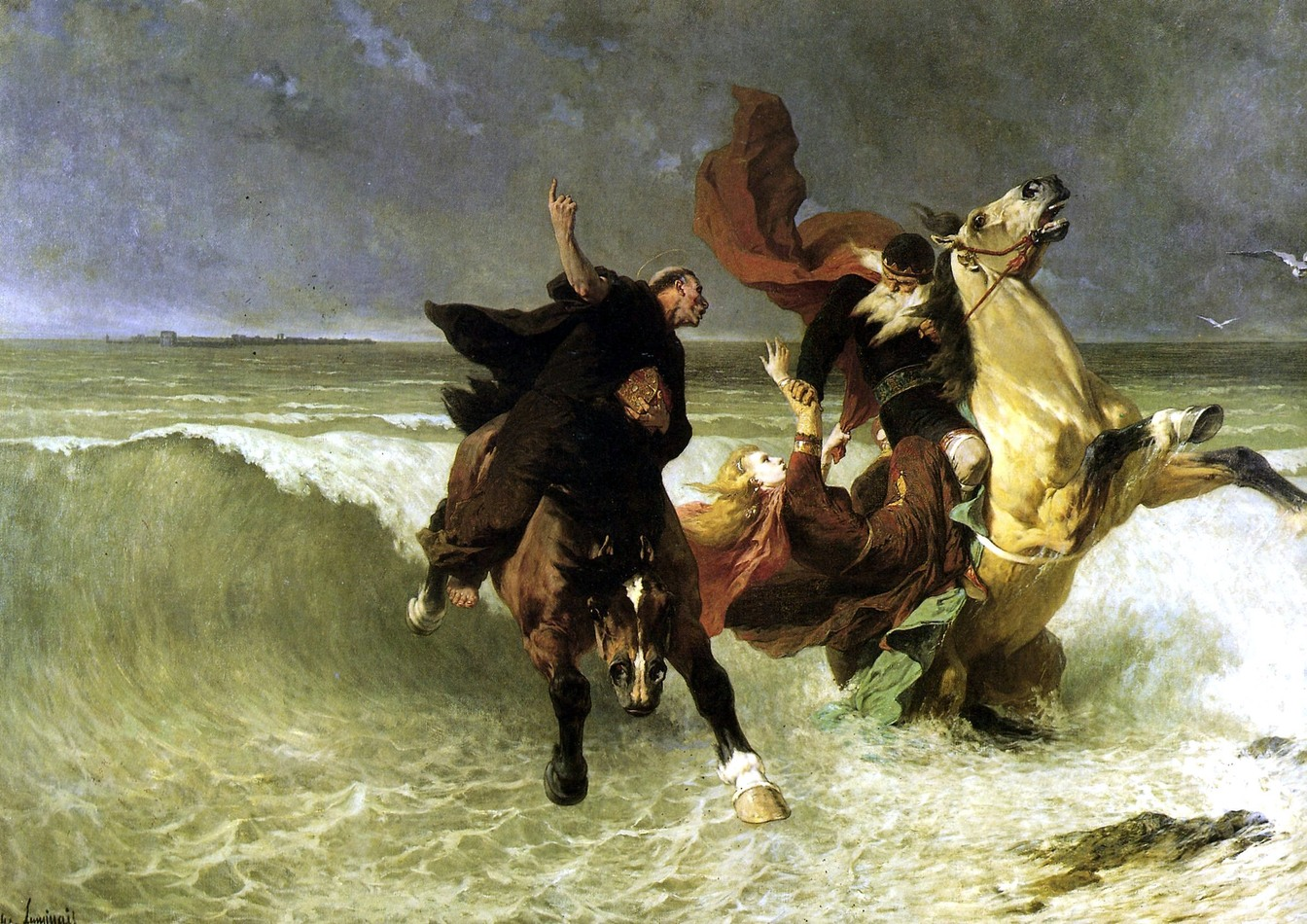
The painting "La Fuite de Gradlon" by Evariste-Vital Luminais. This work is held in Quimper's Musée de beaux-arts. In the legend Gradlon's daughter Dahut was possessed by a half-fairy, half-woman. He rejected her and she became the most evil woman in Brittany. She stole keys to the sluice gates and caused the seas to engulf the city of Caer Ys. Gradlon tried to rescue his daughter, unaware of her evil, but St. Gwendole pushed Dahut into the sea. She drowned and the waves calmed.

== The confessional box ==
This dates to 1838. On the door is a medallion depicting Saint Peter fishing, with open collar and sleeves rolled up. He has two keys hanging around his neck and, symbolically, is listening to a cockerel crowing.

== The presbytery ==
Above the door to the presbytery are three statues. In the centre is a "piéta" believed to have been part of a calvary. The other sculptures are a statue of Saint Tugen in the dress of a bishop and holding a bunch of keys and a statue depicting John the Baptist.

== See also ==
- Culture of France
- French architecture
- History of France
- Religion in France
- Roman Catholicism in France
