= Telgruc-sur-Mer =

Telgruc-sur-Mer Terrug
- Commune
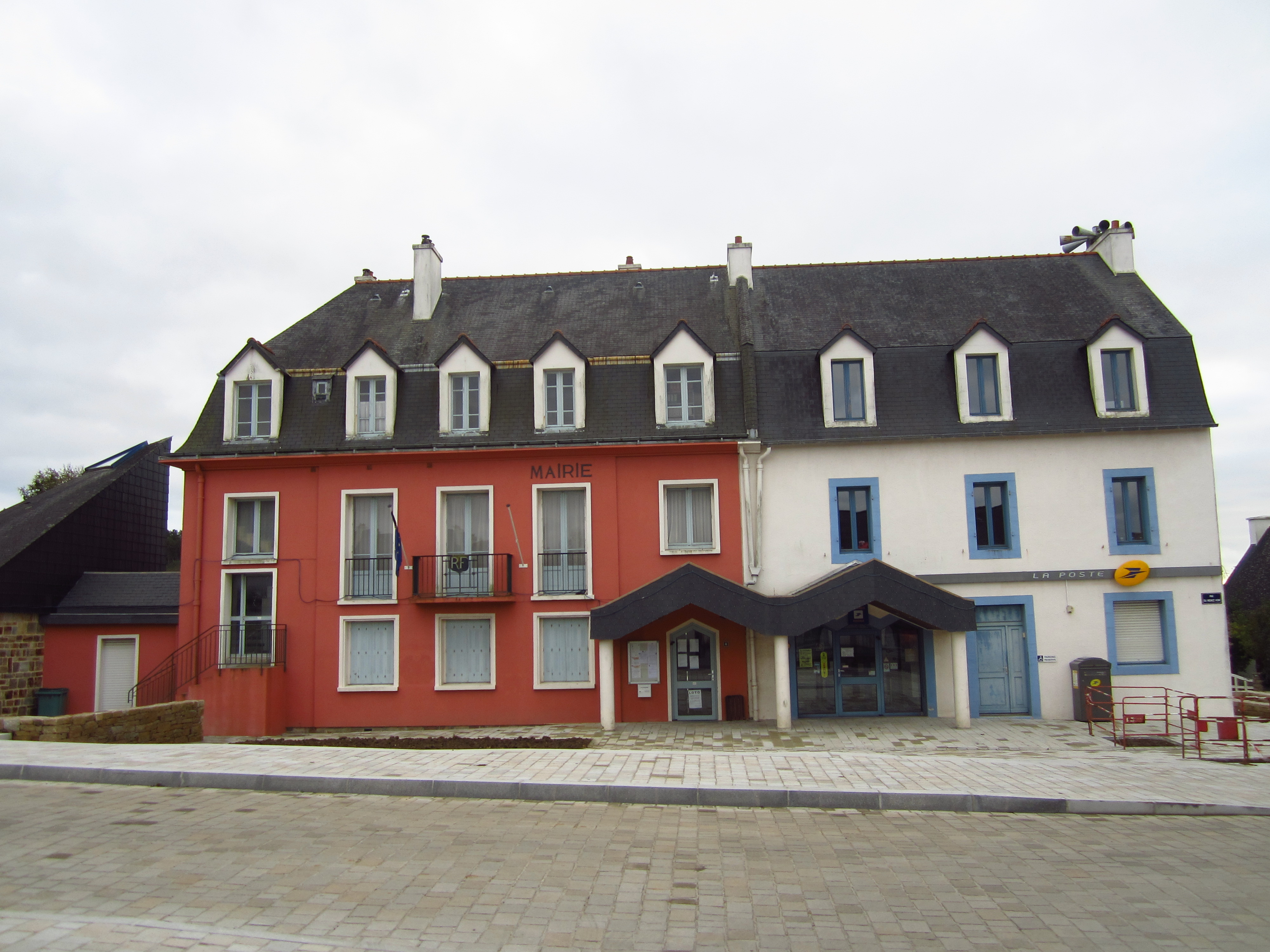
- The town hall in Telgruc-sur-Mer

- Coat of arms
- Location of Telgruc-sur-Mer
- Location within France Location within Brittany
- Coordinates: 48°13′57″N 4°21′18″W
- Country: France
- Region: Brittany
- Department: Finistère
- Arrondissement: Châteaulin
- Canton: Crozon
- Intercommunality: Presqu'île de Crozon-Aulne maritime

Government
  - Mayor (2022–2026): Mathilde Paillot-Pouliquen
- Area^{1}: 28.29 km^{2} (10.92 sq mi)
- Highest elevation: 145 m (476 ft)
- Lowest elevation: 0 m (0 ft)
- Population (2023): 2,167
  - Density: 76.60/km^{2} (198.4/sq mi)
- Time zone: UTC+01:00 (CET)
  - Summer (DST): UTC+02:00 (CEST)
- INSEE/Postal code: 29280 /29560
- Website: telgruc-sur-mer.bzh
- ^{1} French Land Register data, which excludes lakes, ponds, glaciers > 1 km^{2} (0.386 sq mi or 247 acres) and river estuaries.

Telgruc-sur-Mer (French pronunciation: [tɛlɡʁyk syʁ mɛʁ], literally Telgruc on Sea; Breton: Terrug) is a commune in the Finistère department of Brittany in north-western France.

== History ==
On 3 September 1944, during World War II, the village was subjected to heavy bombing by American B17s even though the occupying German soldiers had moved out on 30 August and the village was in the hands of American troops. 108 deaths were recorded spread between French civilians, resistance fighters and the US Army 17th Cavalry Reconnaissance Squadron. The 16th century St. Magloire Church was partly destroyed; however the bell tower remained standing. The church has been remodelled and rebuilt and was consecrated in 1951.

== Population ==
Inhabitants of Telgruc-sur-Mer are called in French Telgruciens.

Historical population
Year	Pop.	±% p.a.
1968	1,901	—
1975	1,873	−0.21%
1982	1,838	−0.27%
1990	1,811	−0.18%
1999	1,822	+0.07%
2007	2,002	+1.18%
2012	2,101	+0.97%
2017	2,085	−0.15%
2023	2,167	+0.64%
Source: INSEE

== Geography and geology ==
Telgruc-sur-Mer is located off the D887 road 21 km (13 mi) west of Châteaulin on the Crozon Peninsula. Historically, it belongs to Cornouaille. On the coastline at Pointe de Beg ar Gwin is an exposure of geological unconformity between the Paleozoic, Cap de la Chèvre formation and the shales and sandstones of the Proterozoic, Briovérien. Quartzite and quartz sandstone is mined at Menéz Luz quarry.

== Features ==
Moulin de Luzeoc, a restored stone tower windmill stands not far from the coast, near Penquer - Le Caon. The height of the windmill to the top of its conical roof is 8.4 metres (28 ft). The roof was originally thatched but has been remade with Chestnut shingles. The sails have a span of 13.15 metres (43 ft). The original mill was built circa 1835 and milling took place until about 1915. Abandoned, its condition deteriorated but a replica has been constructed, which first opened to visitors in 2016.

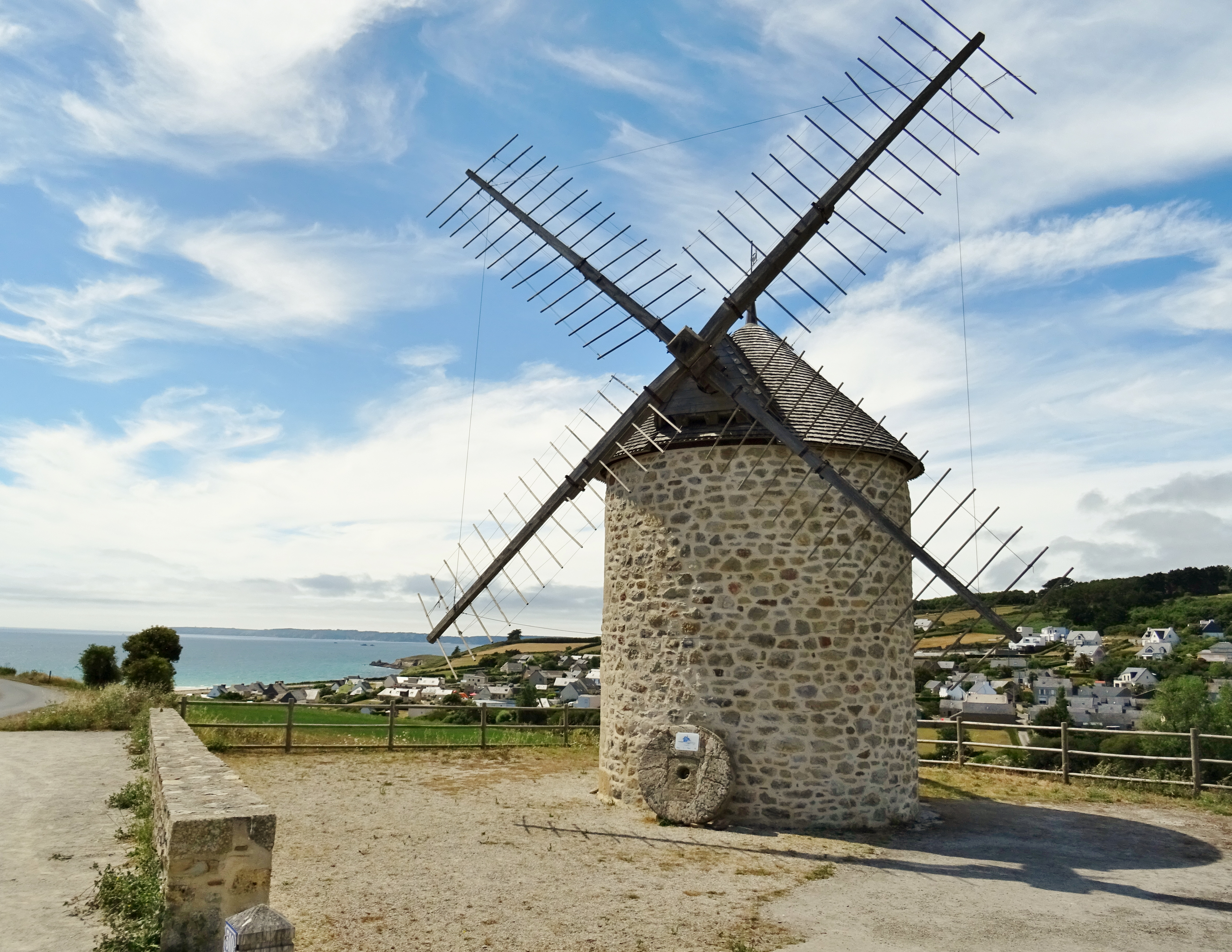
Luzeoc windmill

A project to document and restore the commune's outdoor fountains and wash houses has been ongoing since 2021.

== Map ==
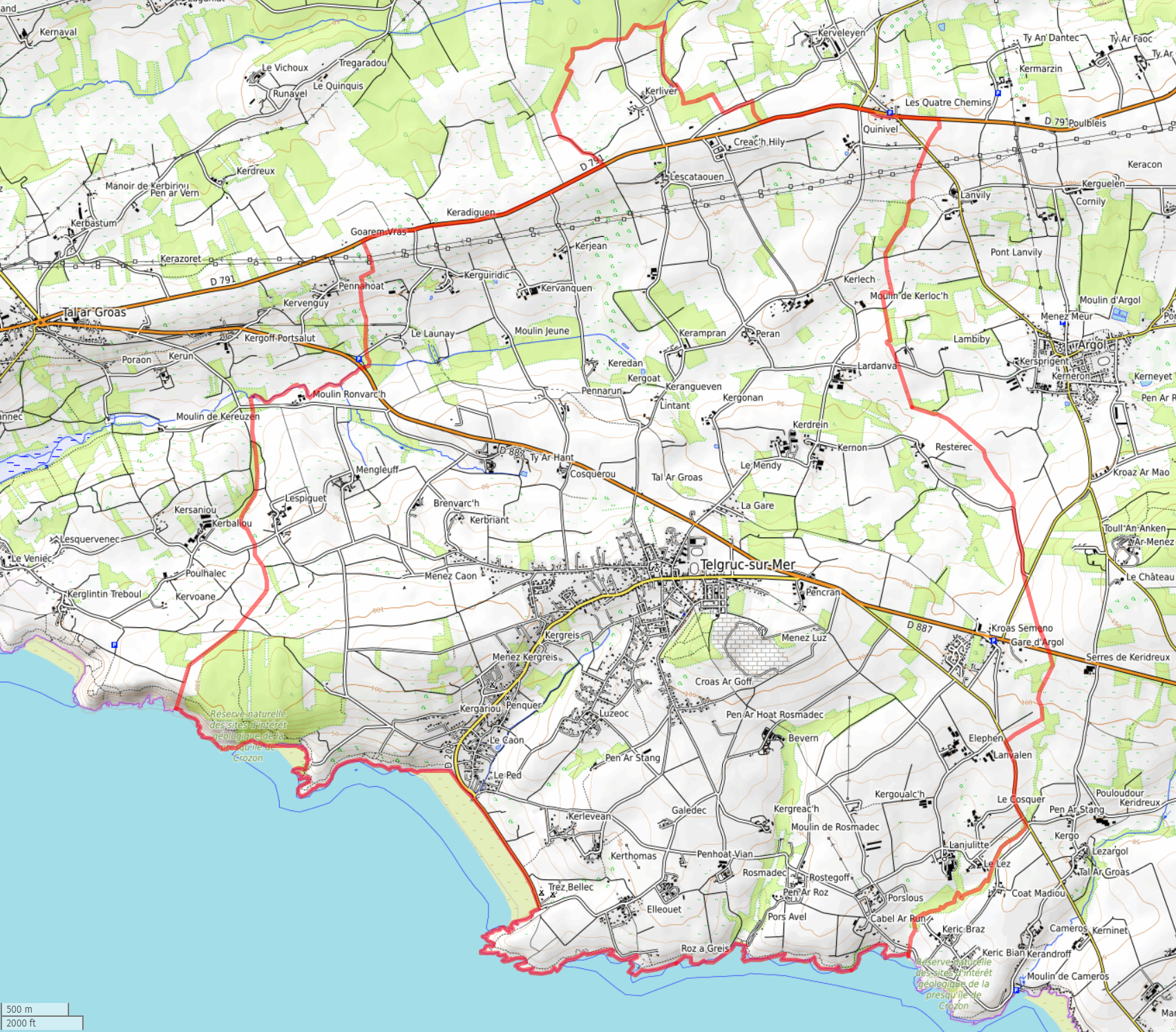
Topographic map

== See also ==
- Communes of the Finistère department
- Parc naturel régional d'Armorique
