= Poullaouen =

Poullaouen Poullaouen
- Commune
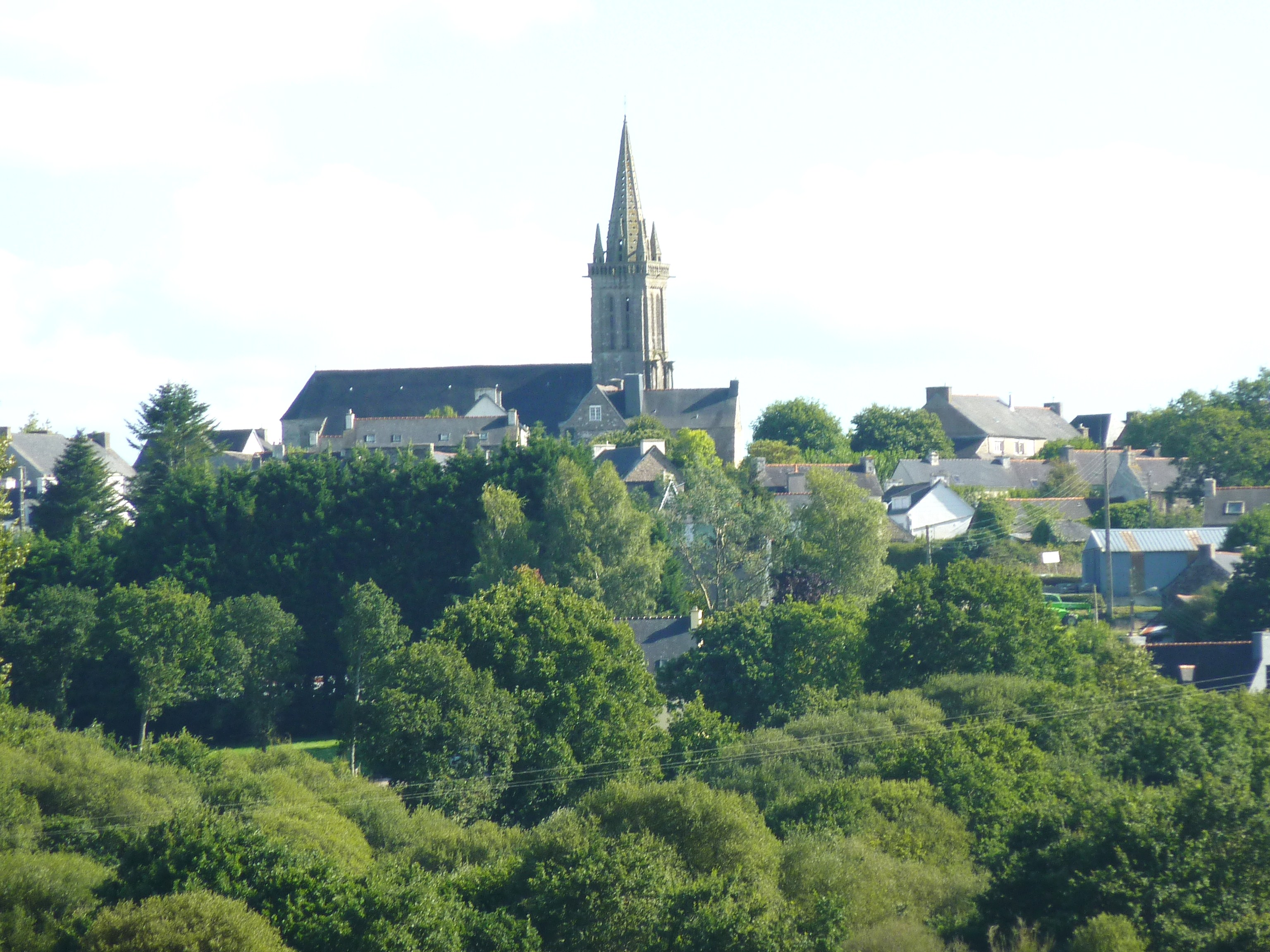
- A general view of Poullaouen

- Coat of arms
- Location of Poullaouen
- Location within France Location within Brittany
- Coordinates: 48°20′27″N 3°38′29″W
- Country: France
- Region: Brittany
- Department: Finistère
- Arrondissement: Châteaulin
- Canton: Carhaix-Plouguer
- Intercommunality: Poher

Government
  - Mayor (2020–2026): Didier Goubil
- Area^{1}: 88.56 km^{2} (34.19 sq mi)
- Highest elevation: 218 m (715 ft)
- Lowest elevation: 69 m (226 ft)
- Population (2023): 1,470
  - Density: 16.6/km^{2} (43.0/sq mi)
- Time zone: UTC+01:00 (CET)
  - Summer (DST): UTC+02:00 (CEST)
- INSEE/Postal code: 29227 /29246
- ^{1} French Land Register data, which excludes lakes, ponds, glaciers > 1 km^{2} (0.386 sq mi or 247 acres) and river estuaries.

Poullaouen (French pronunciation: [pulawɛn]; Breton: Poullaouen) is a commune in the Finistère department of Brittany in north-western France. On 1 January 2019, the former commune Locmaria-Berrien was merged into Poullaouen.

== Population ==
Inhabitants of Poullaouen are called in French Poullaouenais. The population data in the table below refer to the commune of Poullaouen proper, in its geography at the given years.

Historical population

Year	Pop.	±% p.a.
1793	3,421	—
1800	3,611	+0.78%
1806	3,355	−1.22%
1821	3,142	−0.44%
1831	3,544	+1.21%
1836	3,685	+0.78%
1841	3,700	+0.08%
1846	3,733	+0.18%
1851	3,723	−0.05%
1856	3,662	−0.33%
1861	3,720	+0.31%
1866	3,380	−1.90%
1872	3,158	−1.13%
1876	3,176	+0.14%
1881	2,966	−1.36%
1886	3,172	+1.35%
1891	3,220	+0.30%
1896	3,232	+0.07%
1901	3,353	+0.74%

Year	Pop.	±% p.a.
1906	3,468	+0.68%
1911	3,640	+0.97%
1921	3,635	−0.01%
1926	3,640	+0.03%
1931	3,434	−1.16%
1936	3,316	−0.70%
1946	3,016	−0.94%
1954	2,586	−1.90%
1962	2,327	−1.31%
1968	2,075	−1.89%
1975	1,793	−2.07%
1982	1,731	−0.50%
1990	1,574	−1.18%
1999	1,498	−0.55%
2007	1,385	−0.98%
2012	1,371	−0.20%
2017	1,265	−1.60%
2023	1,470	+2.53%

Source: EHESS and INSEE (2007-2023)

== See also ==
- Communes of the Finistère department
