= Saint-Coulitz =

Saint-Coulitz Sant-Kouled
- Commune
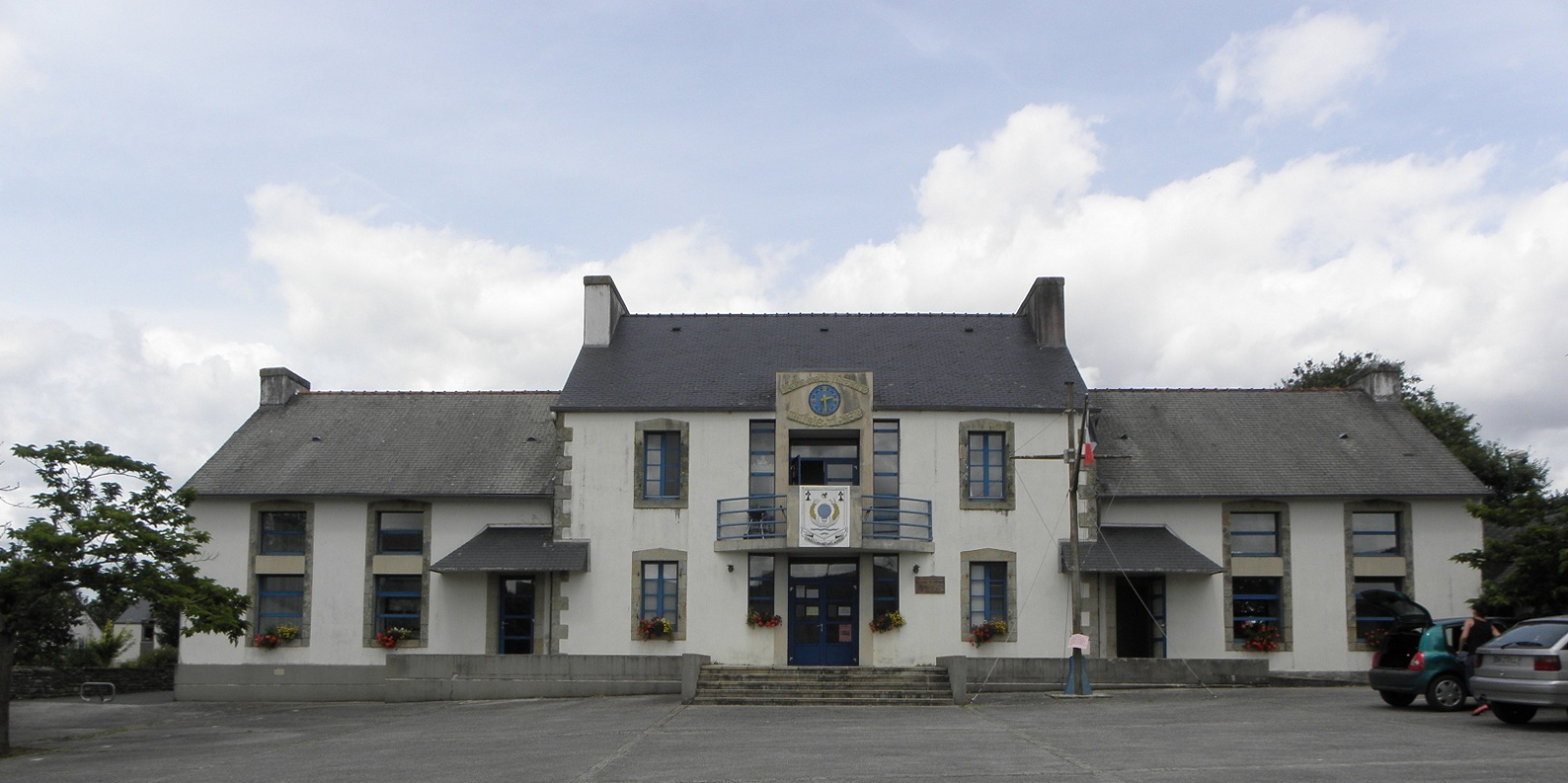
- The town hall in Saint-Coulitz
- Location of Saint-Coulitz
- Location within France Location within Brittany
- Coordinates: 48°11′28″N 4°03′36″W
- Country: France
- Region: Brittany
- Department: Finistère
- Arrondissement: Châteaulin
- Canton: Crozon
- Intercommunality: Pleyben-Châteaulin-Porzay

Government
  - Mayor (2020–2026): Gilles Salaün
- Area^{1}: 11.22 km^{2} (4.33 sq mi)
- Highest elevation: 212 m (696 ft)
- Lowest elevation: 6 m (20 ft)
- Population (2023): 475
  - Density: 42.3/km^{2} (110/sq mi)
- Time zone: UTC+01:00 (CET)
  - Summer (DST): UTC+02:00 (CEST)
- INSEE/Postal code: 29243 /29150
- ^{1} French Land Register data, which excludes lakes, ponds, glaciers > 1 km^{2} (0.386 sq mi or 247 acres) and river estuaries.

Saint-Coulitz (French pronunciation: [sɛ̃ kuli]; Breton: Sant-Kouled) is a commune in the Finistère department in the region of Brittany, northwestern France.

== Population ==
Inhabitants of Saint-Coulitz are called in French Saint-Coulitziens.

== See also ==
- Communes of the Finistère department
- Kofi Yamgnane (b. 1945), former mayor of the village.
- Parc naturel régional d'Armorique
