= Trégarvan =

Trégarvan Tregarvan
- Commune
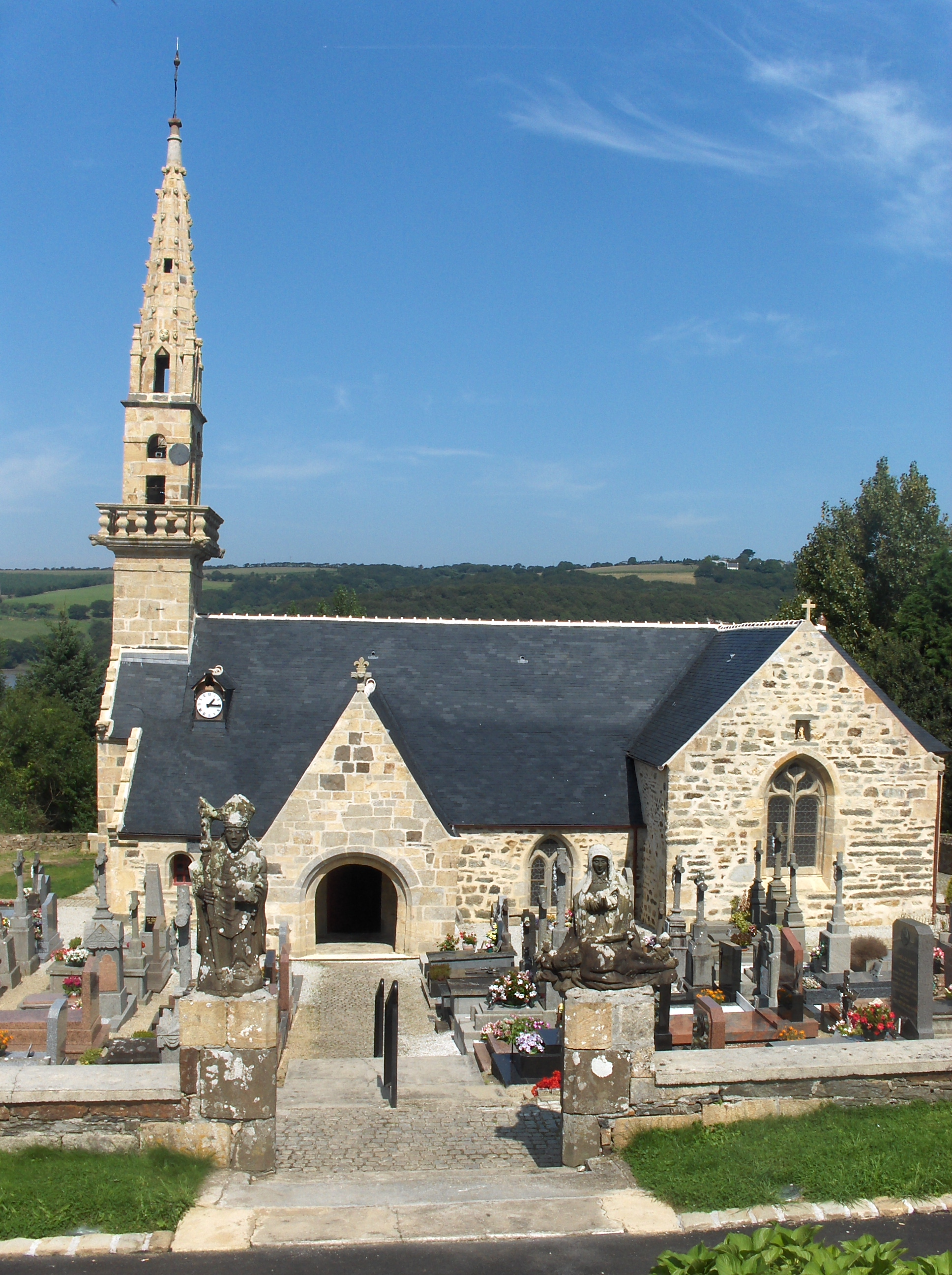
- The church in Trégarvan

- Coat of arms
- Location of Trégarvan
- Location within France Location within Brittany
- Coordinates: 48°15′07″N 4°13′20″W
- Country: France
- Region: Brittany
- Department: Finistère
- Arrondissement: Châteaulin
- Canton: Crozon
- Intercommunality: Pleyben-Châteaulin-Porzay

Government
  - Mayor (2020–2026): Remi Carpentier
- Area^{1}: 9.68 km^{2} (3.74 sq mi)
- Highest elevation: 223 m (732 ft)
- Lowest elevation: 0 m (0 ft)
- Population (2023): 134
  - Density: 13.8/km^{2} (35.9/sq mi)
- Time zone: UTC+01:00 (CET)
  - Summer (DST): UTC+02:00 (CEST)
- INSEE/Postal code: 29289 /29560
- ^{1} French Land Register data, which excludes lakes, ponds, glaciers > 1 km^{2} (0.386 sq mi or 247 acres) and river estuaries.

Trégarvan (French pronunciation: [tʁeɡaʁvɑ̃]; Breton: Tregarvan) is a commune in the Finistère department of Brittany in north-western France.

== See also ==
- Communes of the Finistère department
- Parc naturel régional d'Armorique
