= Ploéven =

Ploéven Ploeven
- Commune
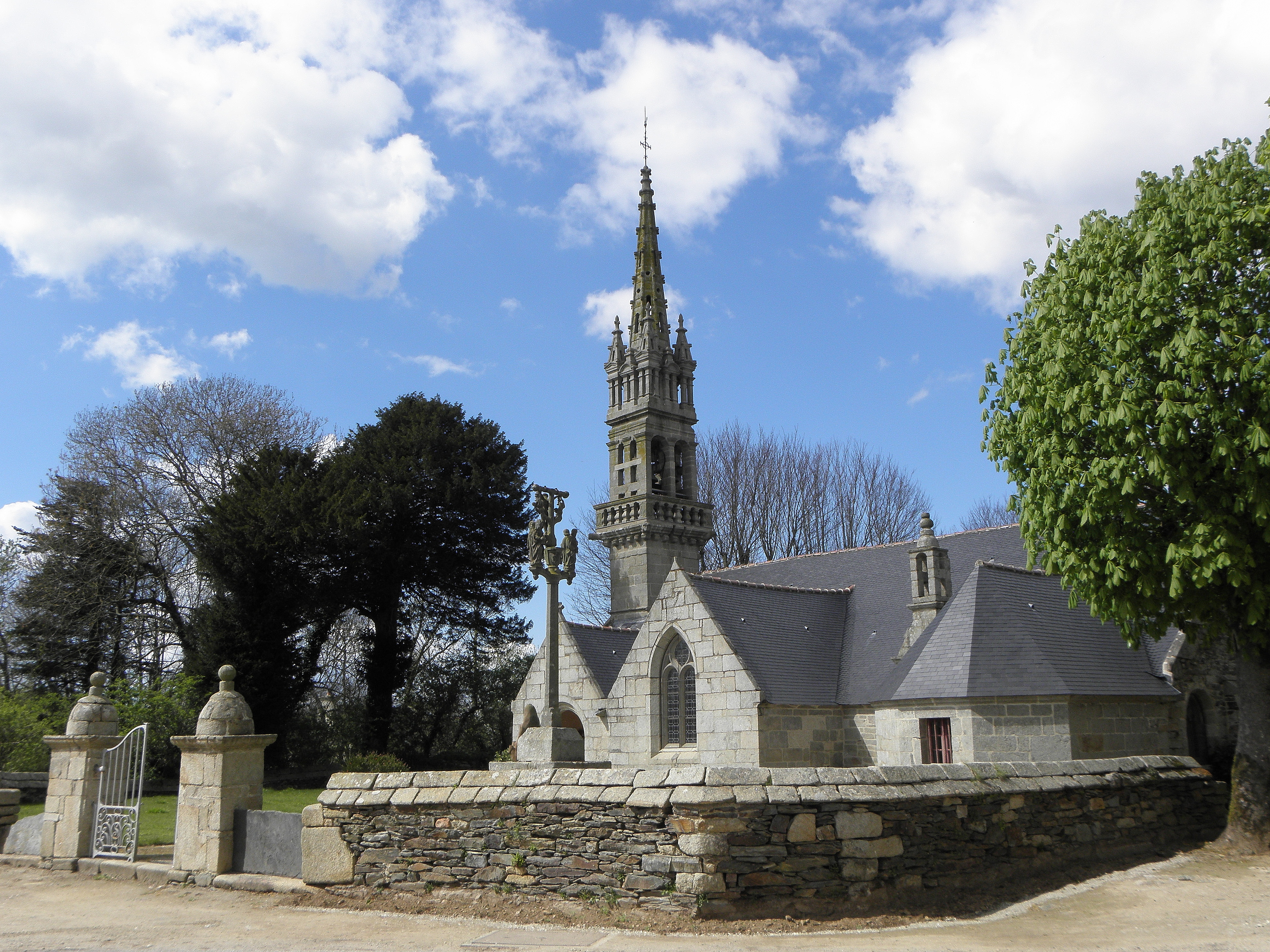
- The church in Ploéven
- Location of Ploéven
- Location within France Location within Brittany
- Coordinates: 48°09′29″N 4°13′57″W
- Country: France
- Region: Brittany
- Department: Finistère
- Arrondissement: Châteaulin
- Canton: Crozon
- Intercommunality: Pleyben-Châteaulin-Porzay

Government
  - Mayor (2020–2026): Didier Planté
- Area^{1}: 13.00 km^{2} (5.02 sq mi)
- Highest elevation: 96 m (315 ft)
- Lowest elevation: 0 m (0 ft)
- Population (2023): 550
  - Density: 42/km^{2} (110/sq mi)
- Time zone: UTC+01:00 (CET)
  - Summer (DST): UTC+02:00 (CEST)
- INSEE/Postal code: 29166 /29550
- ^{1} French Land Register data, which excludes lakes, ponds, glaciers > 1 km^{2} (0.386 sq mi or 247 acres) and river estuaries.

Ploéven (French pronunciation: [plɔevɛ̃]; Breton: Ploeven) is a commune in the Finistère department of Brittany in north-western France.

== Population ==
Historical population
Year	Pop.	±% p.a.
1968	445	—
1975	423	−0.72%
1982	438	+0.50%
1990	450	+0.34%
1999	436	−0.35%
2007	480	+1.21%
2012	514	+1.38%
2017	518	+0.16%
2023	550	+1.00%
Source: INSEE

Inhabitants of Ploéven are called in French Ploévenois.

== See also ==
- Communes of the Finistère department
- Roland Doré sculptor
