= Port-Launay =

Port-Launay Meilh-ar-Wern
- Commune
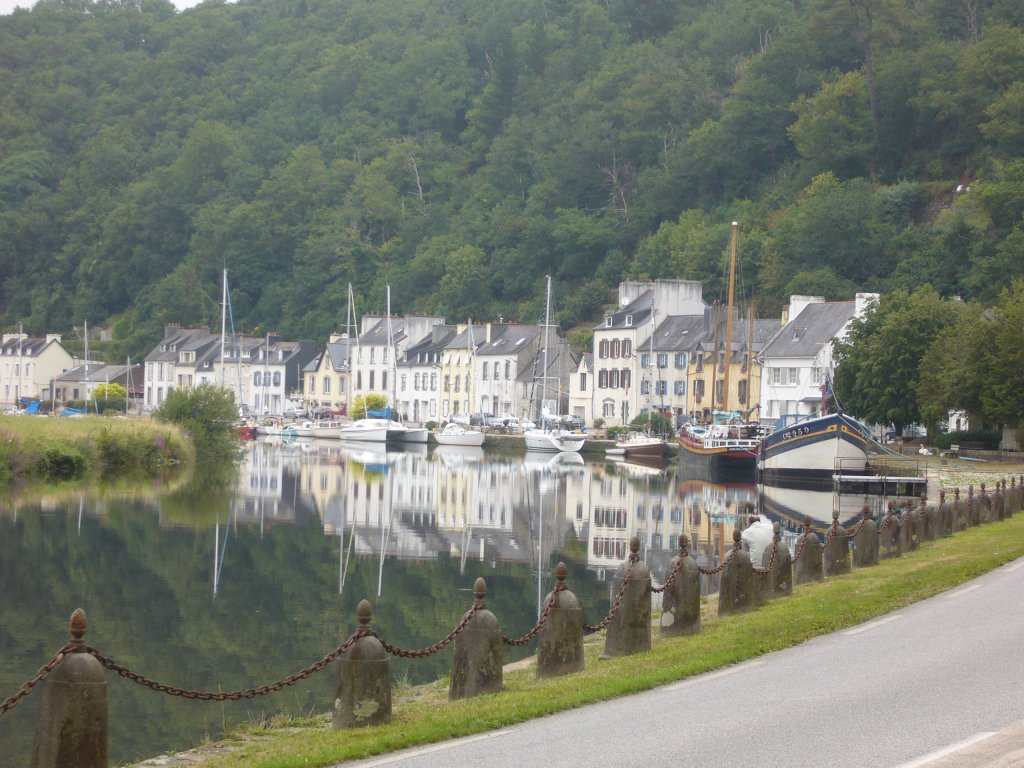
- Port-Launay and the river Aulne
- Location of Port-Launay
- Location within France Location within Brittany
- Coordinates: 48°12′59″N 4°04′10″W
- Country: France
- Region: Brittany
- Department: Finistère
- Arrondissement: Châteaulin
- Canton: Crozon
- Intercommunality: Pleyben-Châteaulin-Porzay

Government
  - Mayor (2020–2026): Gaël Calvar
- Area^{1}: 2.00 km^{2} (0.77 sq mi)
- Highest elevation: 86 m (282 ft)
- Lowest elevation: 2 m (6.6 ft)
- Population (2023): 404
  - Density: 202/km^{2} (523/sq mi)
- Time zone: UTC+01:00 (CET)
  - Summer (DST): UTC+02:00 (CEST)
- INSEE/Postal code: 29222 /29150
- ^{1} French Land Register data, which excludes lakes, ponds, glaciers > 1 km^{2} (0.386 sq mi or 247 acres) and river estuaries.

Port-Launay (French pronunciation: [pɔʁ lonɛ]; Breton: Meilh-ar-Wern) is a commune in the Finistère department of Brittany in north-western France.

== Population ==
Inhabitants of Port-Launay are called in French Port-Launistes.

Historical population

Year	Pop.	±% p.a.
1841	778	—
1846	858	+1.98%
1851	926	+1.54%
1856	898	−0.61%
1861	944	+1.00%
1866	1,329	+7.08%
1872	1,140	−2.52%
1876	1,115	−0.55%
1881	1,115	+0.00%
1886	1,147	+0.57%
1891	1,062	−1.53%
1896	1,063	+0.02%
1901	1,006	−1.10%
1906	1,069	+1.22%
1911	953	−2.27%
1921	829	−1.38%

Year	Pop.	±% p.a.
1926	800	−0.71%
1931	700	−2.64%
1936	668	−0.93%
1946	756	+1.25%
1954	616	−2.53%
1962	648	+0.64%
1968	599	−1.30%
1975	543	−1.39%
1982	505	−1.03%
1990	395	−3.02%
1999	464	+1.80%
2007	476	+0.32%
2012	422	−2.38%
2017	391	−1.51%
2023	404	+0.55%

Source: EHESS and INSEE (1968-2023)

== See also ==
- Communes of the Finistère department
- Parc naturel régional d'Armorique
