= Dinéault =

Dinéault Dineol
- Commune
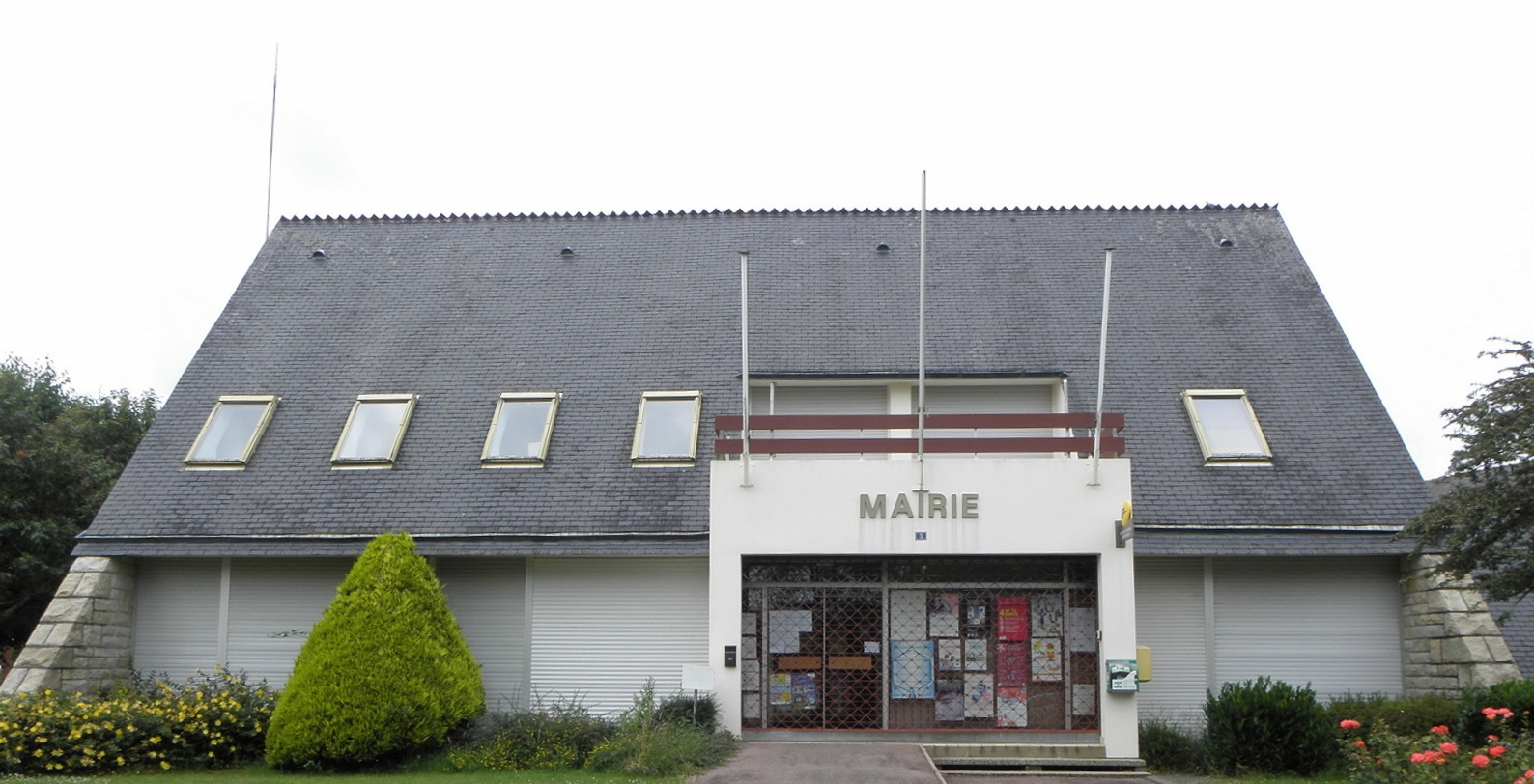
- The town hall in Dinéault

- Coat of arms
- Location of Dinéault
- Location within France Location within Brittany
- Coordinates: 48°13′13″N 4°09′50″W
- Country: France
- Region: Brittany
- Department: Finistère
- Arrondissement: Châteaulin
- Canton: Crozon
- Intercommunality: Pleyben-Châteaulin-Porzay

Government
  - Mayor (2020–2026): Christian Horellou
- Area^{1}: 45.96 km^{2} (17.75 sq mi)
- Highest elevation: 326 m (1,070 ft)
- Lowest elevation: 0 m (0 ft)
- Population (2023): 1,853
  - Density: 40.32/km^{2} (104.4/sq mi)
- Time zone: UTC+01:00 (CET)
  - Summer (DST): UTC+02:00 (CEST)
- INSEE/Postal code: 29044 /29150
- ^{1} French Land Register data, which excludes lakes, ponds, glaciers > 1 km^{2} (0.386 sq mi or 247 acres) and river estuaries.

Dinéault (French pronunciation: [dineɔl]; Breton: Dineol) is a commune in the Finistère department and administrative region of Brittany in north-western France.

== Population ==
In French the inhabitants of Dinéault are known as Dinéaultais.

== Geography ==
The Menez Hom, a mountain that offers an exceptional panoramic view of the Finistère, is located in the commune.

== Map ==
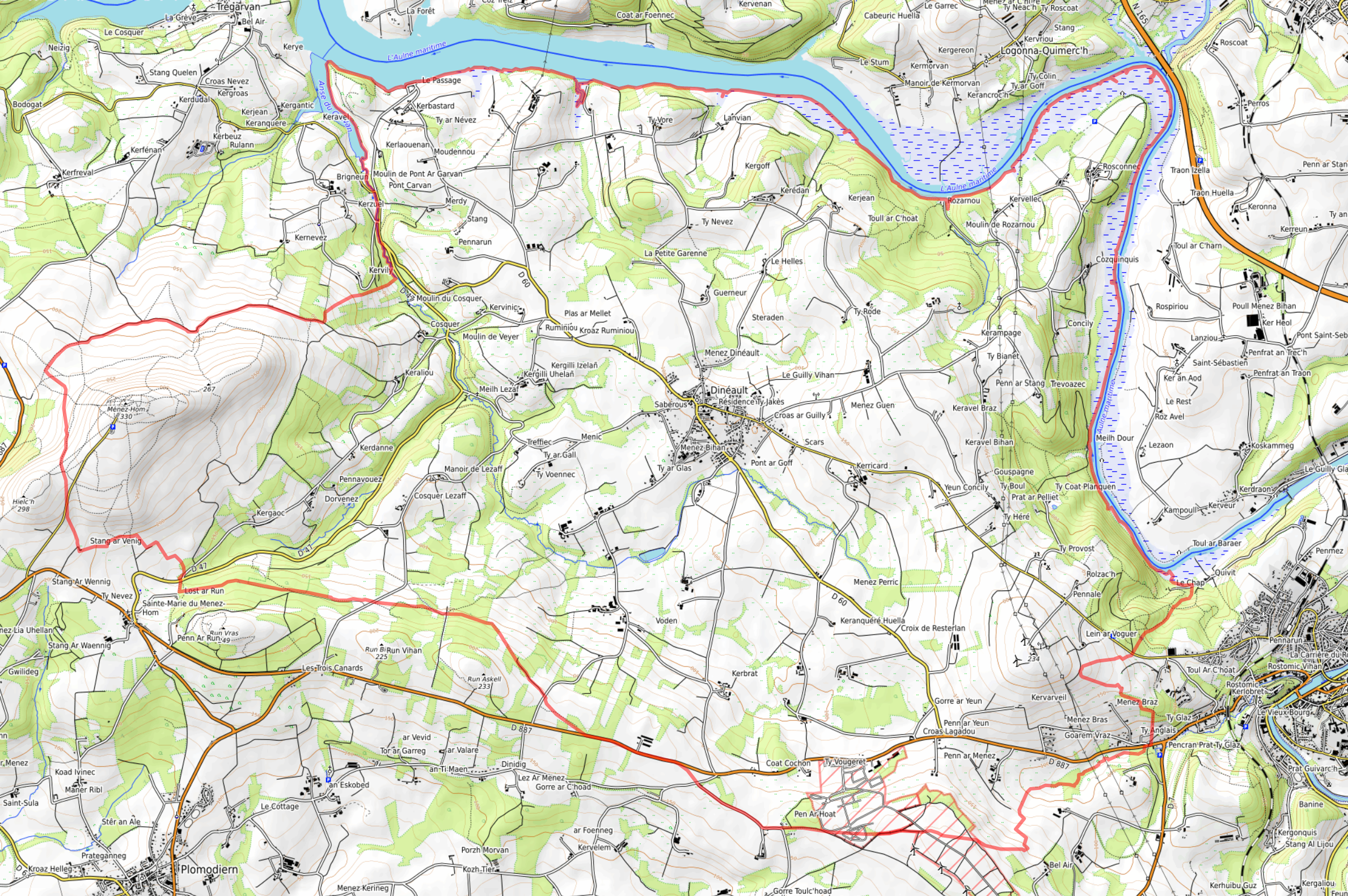
Topographic map

== See also ==
- Communes of the Finistère department
- Parc naturel régional d'Armorique
- Roland Doré sculptor
