= Parc naturel régional d'Armorique =

Regional natural park of France

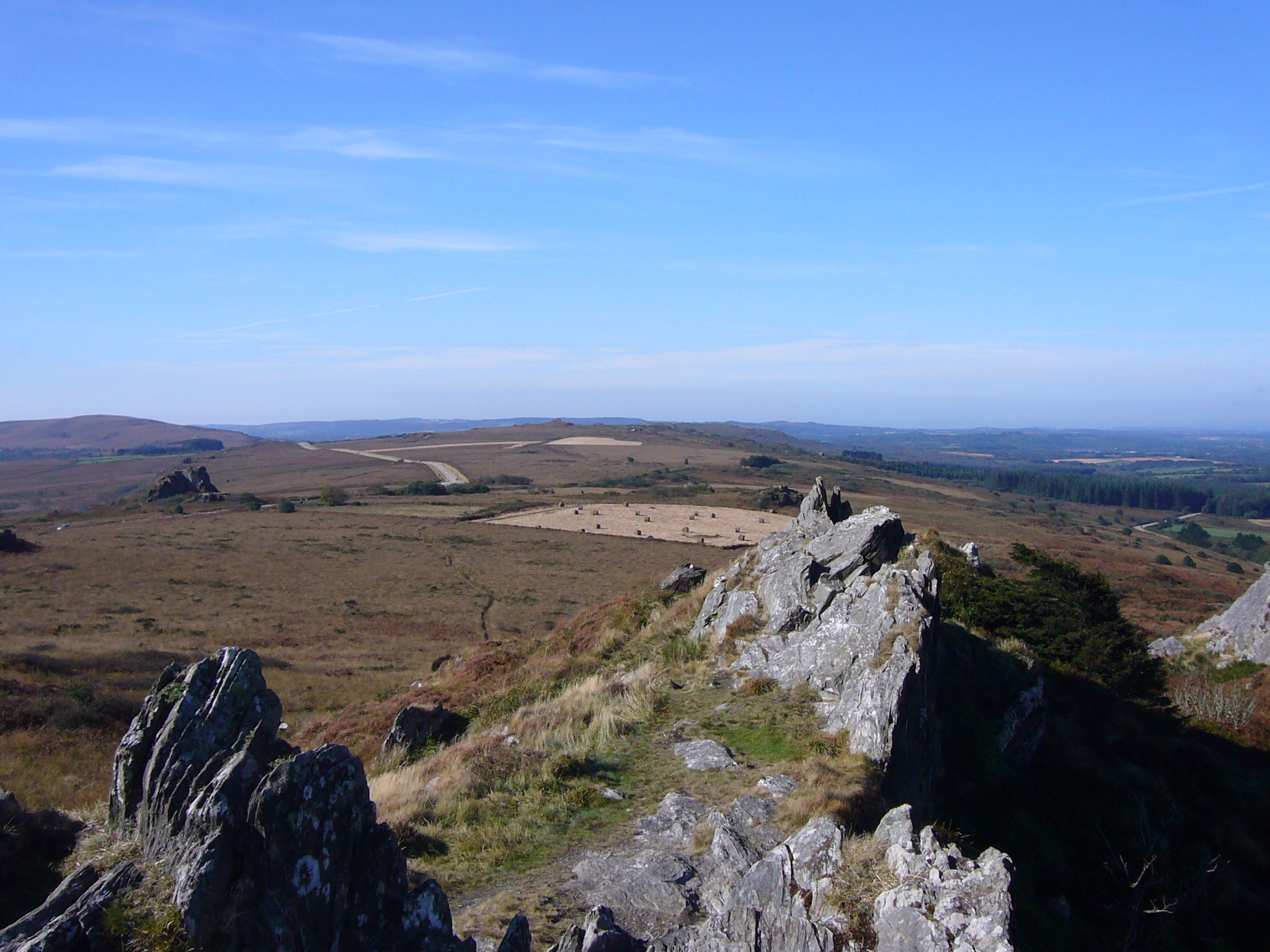
- View along Monts d'Arrée, in Parc naturel régional d'Armorique

- Location within France
- Location: Brittany, France
- Coordinates: 48°15′23″N 4°27′55″W
- Area: 1,250 km^{2} (480 sq mi)
- Website: www.pnr-armorique.fr/fr/index.html

The Parc naturel régional d'Armorique (French pronunciation: [paʁk natyʁɛl ʁeʒjɔnal daʁmɔʁik]; Breton: Park an Arvorig), or Armorica Regional Natural Park, is a rural protected area located in Brittany. The park land reaches from the Atlantic Ocean to hilly inland countryside. There are sandy beaches, swamps, rock formations, fast-flowing rivers and the hills of Monts d'Arrée, all blended into one landscape. The park also includes three islands: Île de Sein, Molène and Ouessant.

The wildlife of the park is diverse and interesting to naturalists. There are sea birds on the islands, European otters and beavers in the rivers and swamps, and interesting birds of prey. In the marshes lives a species of rare carnivorous plant, the sundew, which captures unwary insects.

== History ==
The Armorica regional natural park was founded through a partnership of local and national government in 1969. The park's three islands of Sein, Molène and Ouessant were collectively deemed a UNESCO biosphere reserve in 1988.

== Geology ==
The area is formed largely from sedimentary rocks of Palaeozoic age which have been faulted and folded during the Variscan Orogeny. Several granite plutons such as that at Huelgoat were also emplaced at that time. The Armorican Sandstone is a striking white/light grey rock which forms the cliffs at Pen Hir and Cap de Chevre. Islands and rocks within the Iroise Sea are in the main formed from granite and Carboniferous age limestone. The regional natural park is currently (2018) working towards Geopark status. A local geological museum known as the Maison des Mineraux near the Cap de la Chevre houses displays on the geology of the ‘Espace Remarquable de Bretagne’ or ‘ERB’ which has been designated to conserve the area’s geological heritage.

A series of geosites has been designated within the peninsular part of the regional park:

- Beg ar gwinn
- Enez Louarn
- Le Fort
- Le Fraternit
- Keric Bihan
- Le Loch
- Lostmarc'h
- Pen Hat
- Plage de la Source
- Pointe du Drezec
- Pointe de Gouin - Correjou
- Pointe de Raguenez
- Pointe Sainte Barbe
- Porz Koubou
- Porz Kregwenn
- Porz Nay
- Postolonnec
- Quilien
- Rozan
- Run ar C'hrank
- Saint Fiacre
- Sillon des Anglais
- Sillon du Pal
- Trez Bihan Nord
- Trez Rouz
- Veryac'h
- Le Zorn

== Geography ==
=== Crozon peninsula ===
Besides the islands, the Crozon peninsula forms the western section of the regional natural park. The principal town is Crozon whilst the coastal resorts of Morgat, Camaret-sur-Mer li to its southwest and northwest respectively. Tengruc-sur-Mer is situated in the southeastern part of the peninsula. Road access to the peninsula is provided by the D791 road from Route nationale 165 (E60) at Le Faou and the D887 from Chateaulin. The headlands of Cap de la Chevre and Pointe de Pen Hir are significant local attractions for their coastal scenery and historical associations.

=== Monts d'Arrée ===
Monts d'Arrée is an area where Celtic mythology and Christian traditions coexist peacefully. A local legend explains why the Monts d'Arrée are so bare: when Christ was born, God asked the trees from Monts d'Arrée to cross the sea in order to greet the newborn child. All trees except for the humble pine, gorse and heather refused to do this, and so they were wrenched from the ground as divine punishment.

Although the highest hill, Tuchen Gador, is only 384 meters high, it is easy to get lost. Low fog is frequent between the hills and above the swamps. The Monts are very irregular. The sharp rocks of Tuchen Gador create a striking contrast to the rounded hills of the Mont Saint Michel de Brasparts. Hiking on the Monts can be treacherous because of the ever-changing weather and the uneven and marshy ground.

=== Mont Saint-Michel de Brasparts and the Chapel of Saint-Michel ===
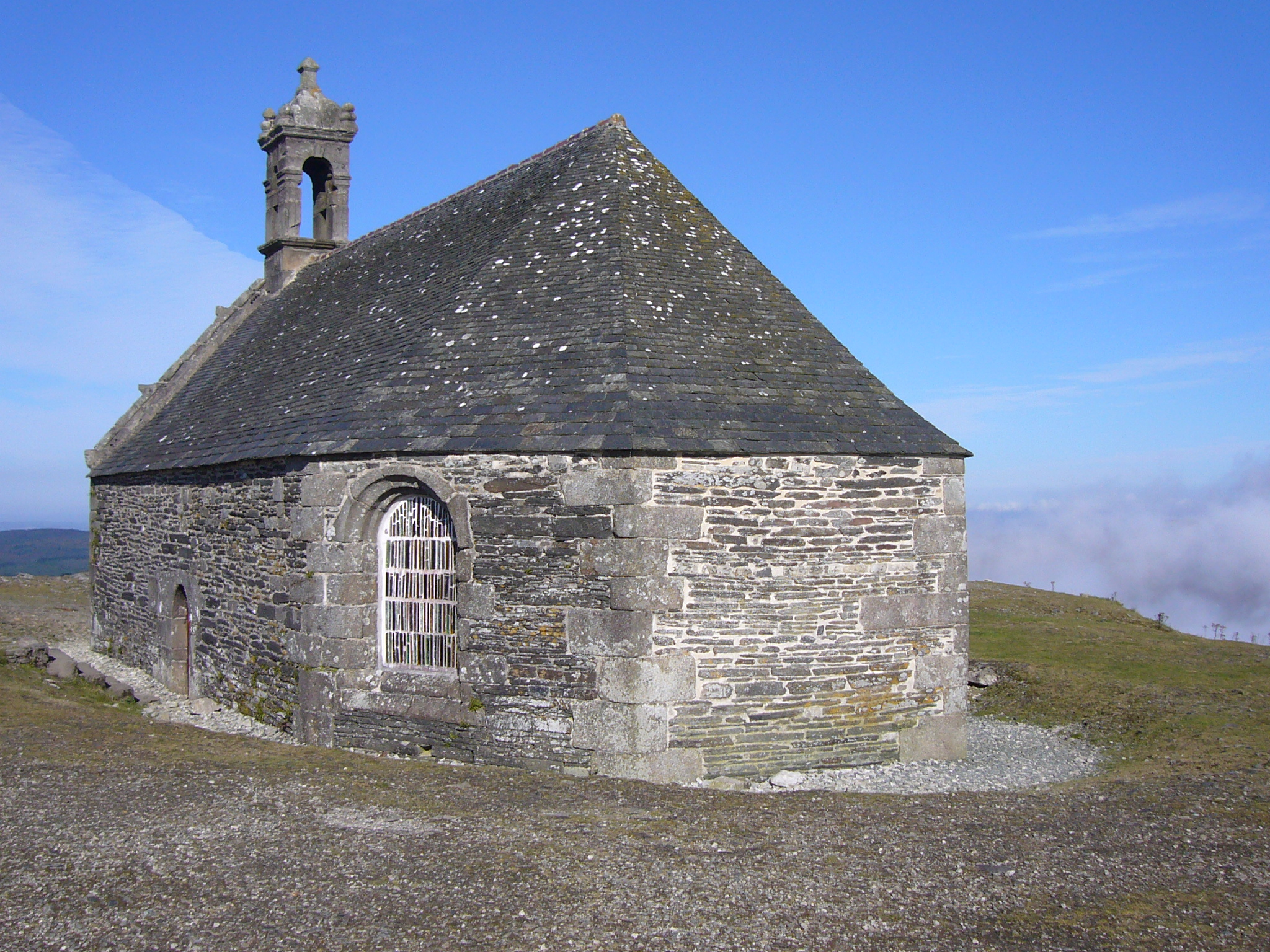
View of chapel of Saint-Michel at Mont Saint-Michel de Brasparts, in the Monts d'Arrée, in Parc naturel régional d'Armorique

Mont Saint-Michel de Brasparts, (Menez-Mikael in Breton) is the most famous hill in the range. The Mont is 380 meters high and is the second highest in the chain of Monts d'Arrée. The Mont was once claimed to be 391 meters high, but this is only true if the height of the Chapel of Saint-Michel is included.

One source claims that the top of the Chapel of Saint-Michel is the highest point in Brittany however the Émetteur de Roc'h Trédudon is 3 m higher at 383 m. If structures on top of these hills are included, the Émetteur de Roc'h Trédudon is even higher, with a 220m antenna on the summit.

The summit of Saint-Michel de Brasparts offers fine views of the bogs of Elez Yeun, and on to Lake Brennilis. When the weather permits, one can see the Pont de l'Iroise, and the Bay of Morlaix.

The Chapel of Saint-Michel was built in 1672. It is dedicated to Archangel Michael. It was vandalized in 1935, when the statue of the Archangel was removed from the chapel. Now the building is empty.

=== Elez Yeun ===
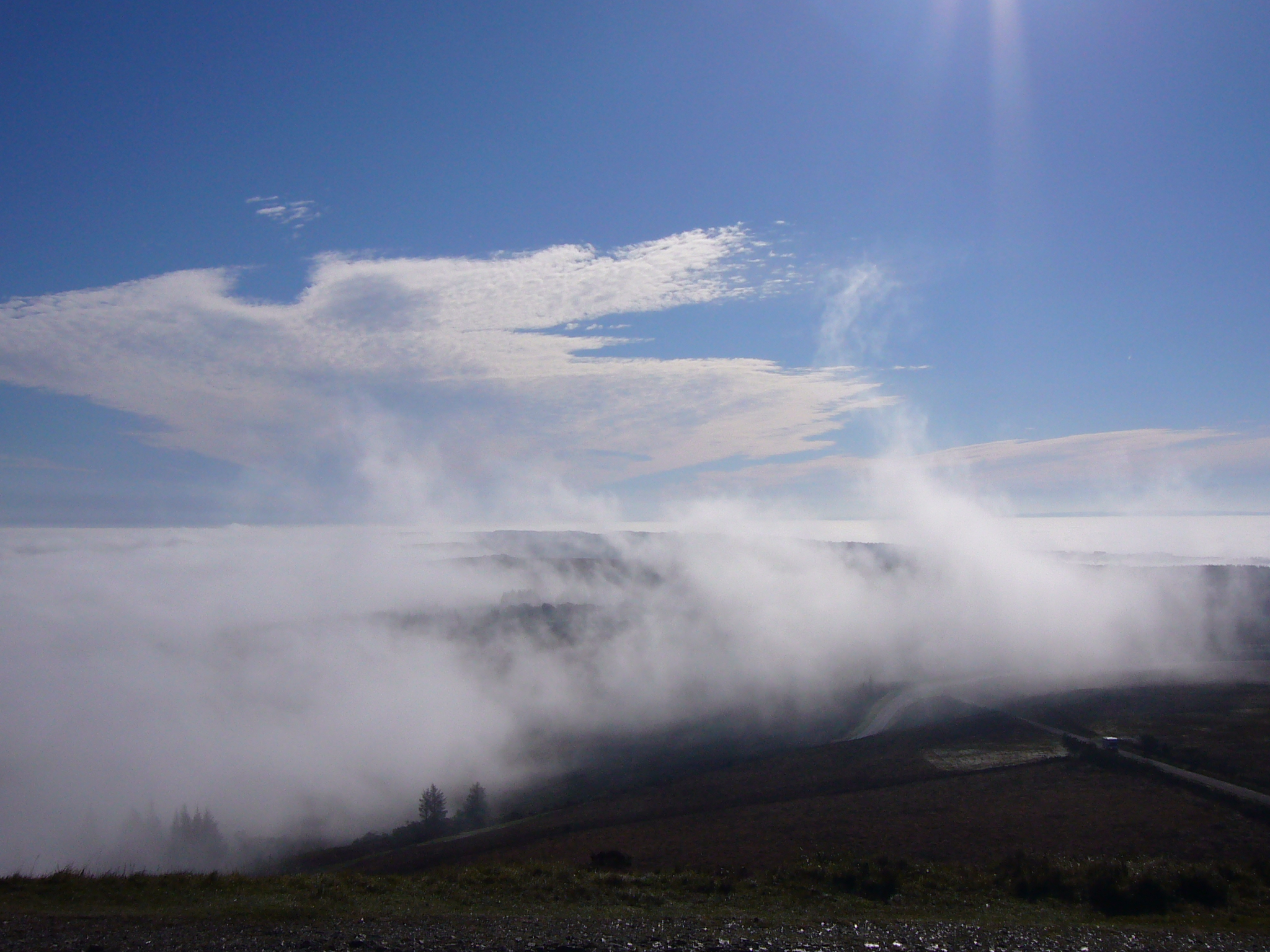
View over Monts d'Arrée in Brittany from Mont Saint-Michel de Brasparts. While it is sunny at the Mont, it is foggy at Elez Yeun

Elez Yeun is a marshy hollow, visible from the summit of Mont Saint-Michel de Brasparts. Ancient tradition claims that it is one of the gates of hell. The word "ellez" is found in few other names around the region, and comes from the same Indo-European root as the word "hell" in English.

==== Legends ====
Elez Yeun is surrounded by many legends and superstitions. It is said that hapless mortals peering into Elez Yeun risked being seized, and dragged down by unseen forces below. Malevolent fiends, often taking the form of a great black dog, are heard baying at night. Another sound heard floating on the night wind comes from the mad revels of lost souls. In Christian folklore, the Youdic (Elez Yeun) was thought to be a place to confine the possessed, but Saint Michael has the power to save souls from falling into it.

One legend describes what happened to a priest and a sexton by the name of Job, when they tried to cross Elez Yeun:

A vast desolation surrounded them. So dark was the night that it seemed to envelop them like a velvet curtain. Beneath their feet they heard the hissing and moaning of the bog, awaiting its prey like a restless and voracious wild beast. Through the dense blackness they could see the iridescent waters writhing and gleaming below. "Surely," said Job half to himself, "this must be the gateway to hell!" At that word the dog uttered a frightful howl-such a howl as froze Job's blood in his veins. It tugged and strained at the cord which held it with the strength of a demon, striving to turn on Job and rend him. "Hold on!" cried the priest in mortal terror, keeping at a safe distance, however. "Hold on, I entreat you, or else we are undone!" Job held on to the demon-dog with all his strength. Indeed, it was necessary to exert every thew and sinew if the animal were to be prevented from tearing him to pieces. Its howls were sufficient to strike terror to the stoutest heart. "Iou! Iou!" it yelled again and again. But Job held on desperately, although the cord cut his hands and blood ran from the scarified palms. Inch by inch he dragged the brute toward the Youdic. The creature in a last desperate effort turned and was about to spring on him open-mouthed, when all at once the priest, darting forward, threw his cloak over its head. It uttered a shriek which sounded through the night like the cry of a lost soul. "Quick!" cried the priest. "Lie flat on the earth and put your face on the ground!" Scarcely had the two men done so than a frightful tumult ensued. First there was the sound of a body leaping into the morass, then such an uproar as could only proceed from the mouth of the infernal regions. Shrieks, cries, hissings, explosions followed in quick succession for upward of half an hour; then gradually they died away and a horrible stillness took their place. The two men rose trembling and unnerved, and slowly took their way through the darkness, groping and stumbling until they had left the awful vicinity of the Yeun behind them.

— Lewis Spence, Legends and Romances of Brittany

The unusual chapel of Saint-Michel is considered to be the home of the Archangel Michael who acts as the protector of lost souls wandering in the marshland below his hill. Michael and the Devil had a long history of fighting and competitions. One of the stories says that the Devil was angry when Mont St. Michel and the chapel were built, probably because he knew that Archangel Michael would be protecting the lost from entering the gates of hell at Elez Yeun. The Devil told St Michael that Mont St. Michel was his, the Devil's, to reside in. Not surprisingly, St. Michael had a different opinion. To decide which one of them was going to keep the Mont, the Devil and St. Michael both agreed to a jumping competition. The Devil jumped and fell into a river, whereas St. Michael's wings carried him much farther away. In this way, St. Michael won the Mont for himself, except for the fact that the Devil still lives somewhere below the Mont.

== Member towns ==
The Armorique parkland contains the following communes:

- Argol
- Berrien
- Bolazec
- Botmeur
- Botsorhel
- Brasparts
- Brennilis
- Camaret-sur-Mer
- Cloître-St-Thégonnec
- Châteaulin
- Commana
- Crozon
- Daoulas
- Dinéault
- Guerlesquin
- Hanvec
- Hôpital-Camfrout
- Huelgoat
- Île de Sein
- La Feuillée
- Landévennec
- Lanvéoc
- Le Faou
- Locmaria-Berrien
- Logonna-Daoulas
- Lopérec
- Loqueffret
- Molène
- Ouessant
- Pleyben
- Plougonven
- Plounéour-Ménez
- Pont-de-Buis-lès-Quimerch
- Port-Launay
- Roscanvel
- Rosnoën
- Saint-Coulitz
- Saint-Eloy
- Saint-Rivoal
- Saint-Ségal
- Scrignac
- Sizun
- Telgruc-sur-Mer
- Trégarvan

== Huelgoat ==
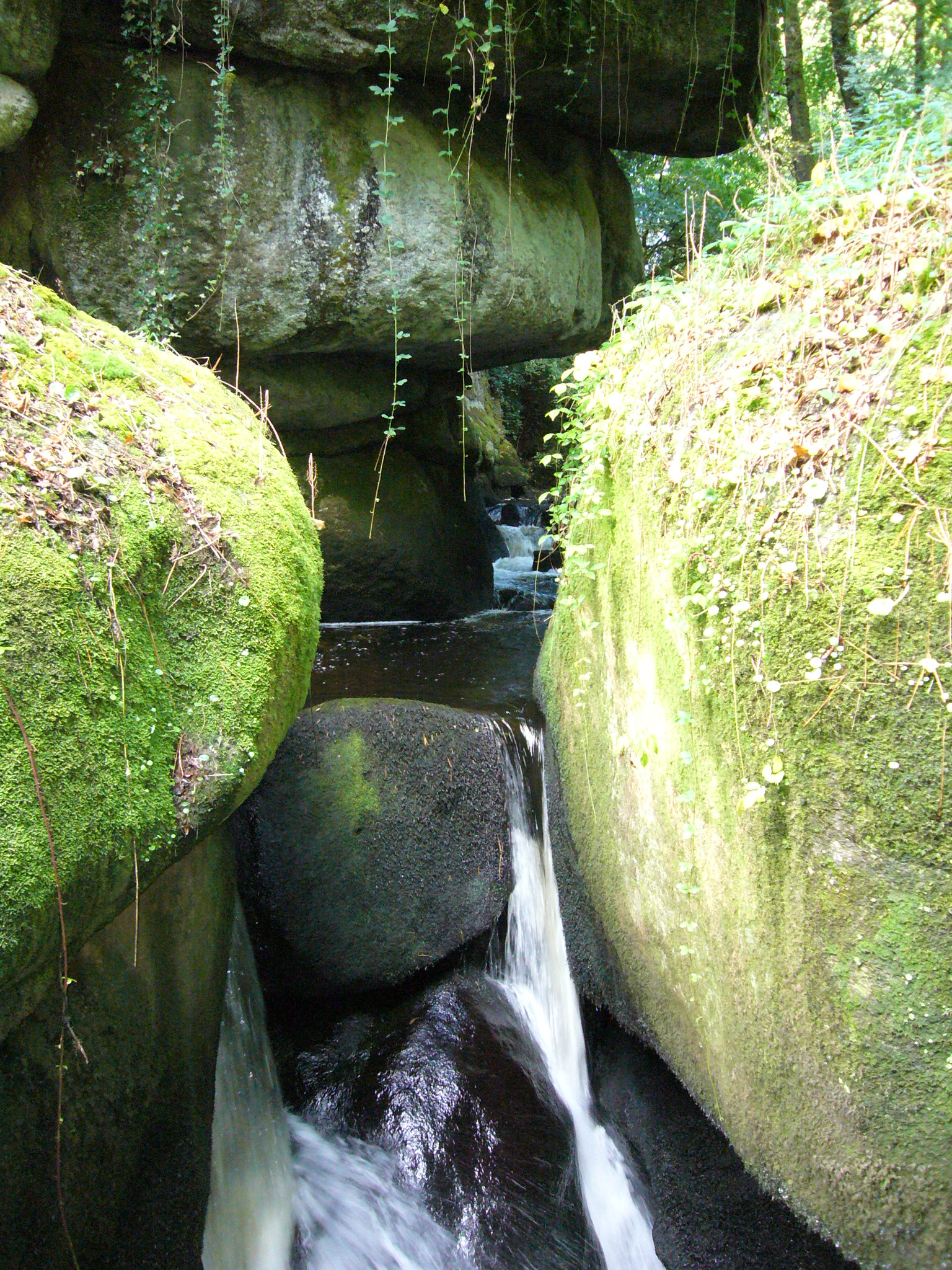
The rocks (French: les rochers) at Huelgoat.

In Huelgoat, unusual rock formations, fast and clear rivers, the lake, and the dark woods create a fairy tale atmosphere. It is said that King Arthur walked there, and even hid his treasures in La Grotte d'Artus, or Arthur's Cave.

== See also ==
- List of regional natural parks of France
