= Locmaria-Berrien =

Locmaria-Berrien Lokmaria-Berrien
- Part of Poullaouen
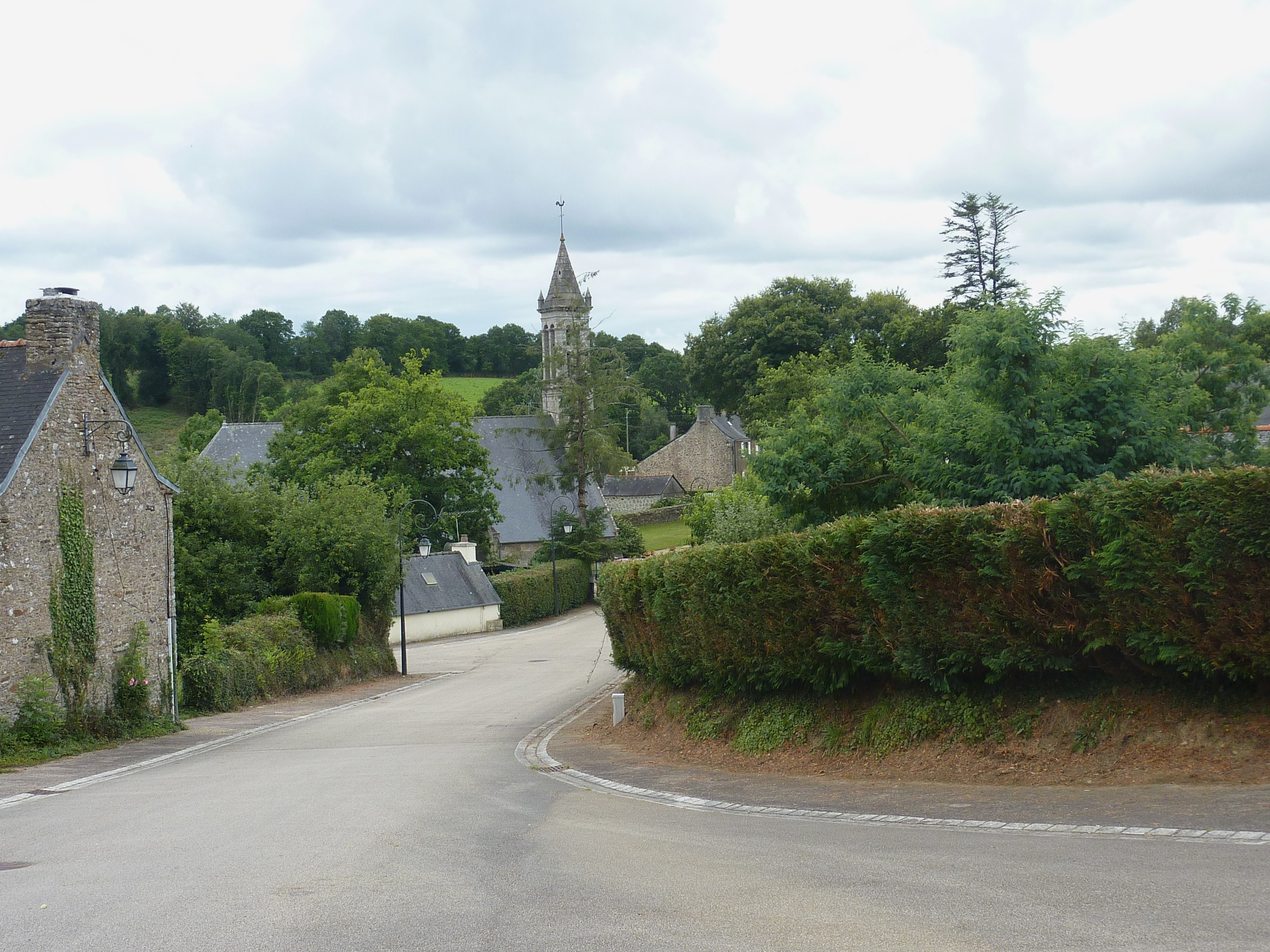
- A general view towards the church in Locmaria-Berrien
- Location of Locmaria-Berrien
- Location within France Location within Brittany
- Coordinates: 48°21′16″N 3°41′37″W
- Country: France
- Region: Brittany
- Department: Finistère
- Arrondissement: Châteaulin
- Canton: Carhaix-Plouguer
- Commune: Poullaouen
- Area^{1}: 17.20 km^{2} (6.64 sq mi)
- Highest elevation: 210 m (690 ft)
- Lowest elevation: 74 m (243 ft)
- Population (2022): 203
  - Density: 11.8/km^{2} (30.6/sq mi)
- Time zone: UTC+01:00 (CET)
  - Summer (DST): UTC+02:00 (CEST)
- Postal code: 29690
- ^{1} French Land Register data, which excludes lakes, ponds, glaciers > 1 km^{2} (0.386 sq mi or 247 acres) and river estuaries.

Locmaria-Berrien (French pronunciation: [lɔkmaʁja bɛʁjɛ̃]; Breton: Lokmaria-Berrien) is a former commune in the Finistère department of Brittany in north-western France. On 1 January 2019, it was merged into the commune Poullaouen.

== Population ==
Inhabitants of Locmaria-Berrien are called in French Locberrienois.

Historical population

Year	Pop.	±% p.a.
1793	1,385	—
1800	939	−5.40%
1806	883	−1.02%
1821	811	−0.57%
1831	992	+2.03%
1836	1,008	+0.32%
1841	996	−0.24%
1846	1,005	+0.18%
1851	1,120	+2.19%
1856	1,105	−0.27%
1861	1,124	+0.34%
1866	914	−4.05%
1872	812	−1.95%
1876	783	−0.91%
1881	805	+0.56%
1886	804	−0.02%
1891	812	+0.20%
1896	828	+0.39%

Year	Pop.	±% p.a.
1901	871	+1.02%
1906	891	+0.46%
1911	900	+0.20%
1921	910	+0.11%
1926	897	−0.29%
1931	877	−0.45%
1936	826	−1.19%
1946	802	−0.29%
1954	667	−2.28%
1962	533	−2.76%
1968	454	−2.64%
1975	325	−4.66%
1982	295	−1.37%
1990	272	−1.01%
1999	285	+0.52%
2007	238	−2.23%
2012	241	+0.25%
2022	203	−1.70%

Source: EHESS and INSEE (2007-2022)

== See also ==
- Communes of the Finistère department
- Parc naturel régional d'Armorique
