= Charles Louis Baptiste Lebreton =

French politician

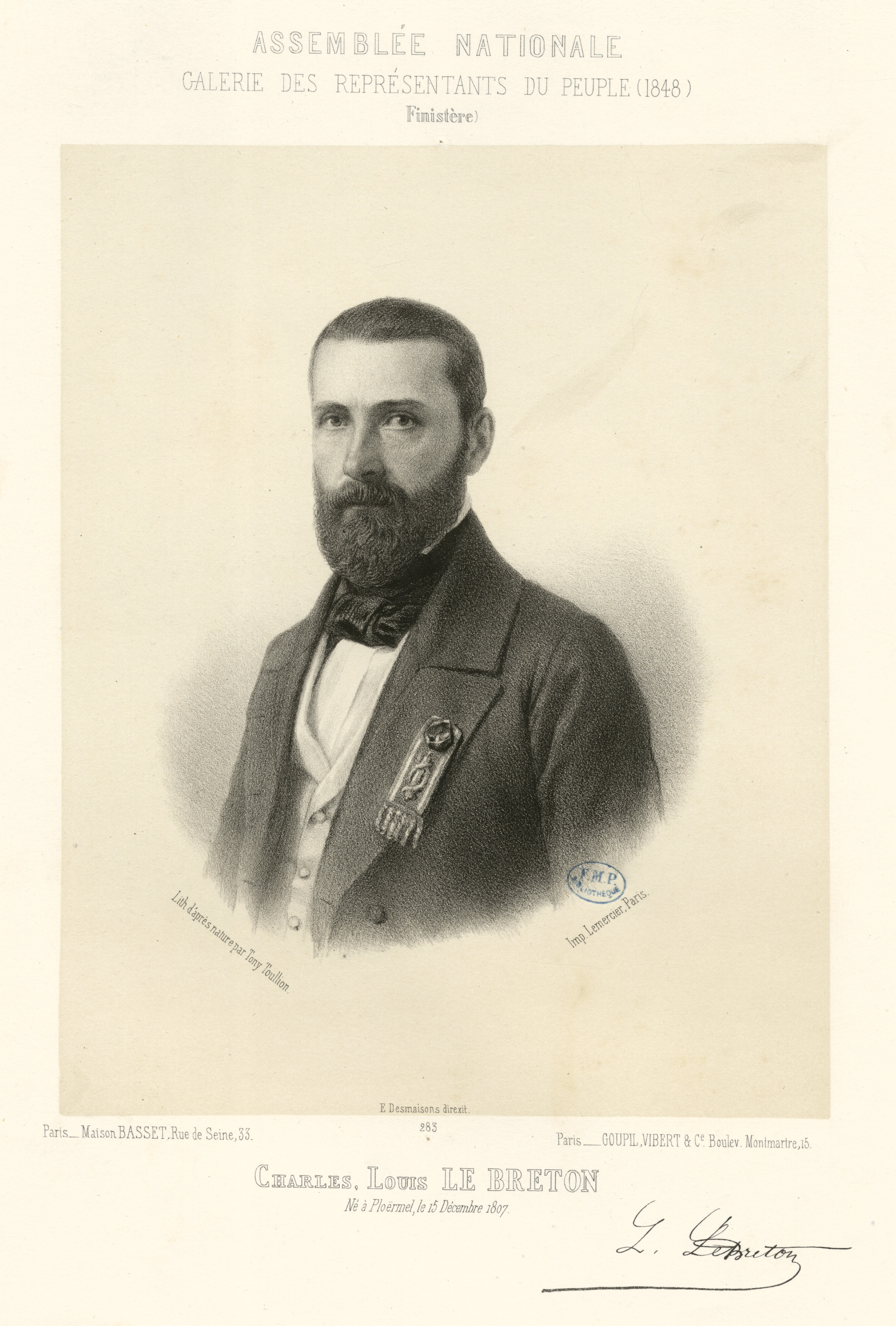

Charles Louis Baptiste Lebreton (born 15 December 1800) was a French politician born in Ploërmel (Morbihan). His date of death is unknown.

Marine surgeon in 1824, he became a medical doctor in 1834 and set up shop in Pleyben. In 1848, he was elected as the representative from Finistère to the Constituent assembly. After not being re-elected in 1849, he found a seat as a deputy in the complementary elections held on 2 July 1871, registered as a member of the Gauche républicaine. He was also General Counsel for the canton of Pleyben in 1871. He left political life in 1876.

According to the Dictionnaire des parlementaires français (1789–1889) by Adolphe Robert and Gaston Cougny, Lebreton was born in Ploërmel (Morbihan) on 15 December 1800, the son of a tax collector from Pleyben (Finistère). He entered the Brest naval school in 1824 as a student surgeon, served aboard the Gerrière, and after receiving his doctorate in Paris in 1834, settled as a physician in Pleyben. Of liberal opinion, he became a correspondent for Le National in his region and was responsible for collecting subscriptions in support of press offences and political detainees.

He was elected on 23 April 1848, representing Finistère in the Constituent Assembly, placing fifth of fifteen with 99,416 votes. He served as secretary of the Navy Committee and generally voted with the National Party. His votes included:

- for the banishment of the Orléans family,
- for the proceedings against Louis Blanc and Marc Caussidière,
- for the abolition of the death penalty,
- against progressive taxation,
- against incompatibility of functions,
- against the Grévy amendment,
- against the punishment of the Constitution by the people,
- for the Constitution as a whole,
- against the Rateau proposal,
- against the ban on clubs,
- against the expedition to Rome.

A moderate but firm opponent of the Élysée’s policy, he was not re-elected to the Legislature and returned to Brittany to resume his medical practice.

After the fall of the Empire, he again stood for election. He was unsuccessful in Finistère in the election of 8 February 1871, as a republican candidate, with 38,774 votes out of 76,988 cast. However, he was elected on 2 July 1871 in the same department, placing third of four on the Republican list, with 58,331 votes (93,916 voters, 169,980 registered). He sat with the Republican left and voted:

- for the return to Paris,
- for dissolution,
- for the proposal of the centre-left,
- against the resignation of Thiers,
- against the extension of the Marshal’s powers,
- against the law on mayors.

He also served as conseiller général of the canton of Pleyben (Finistère), beginning 8 October 1871, before retiring from political life following the dissolution of the National Assembly.
