= Calvary at Plougonven =

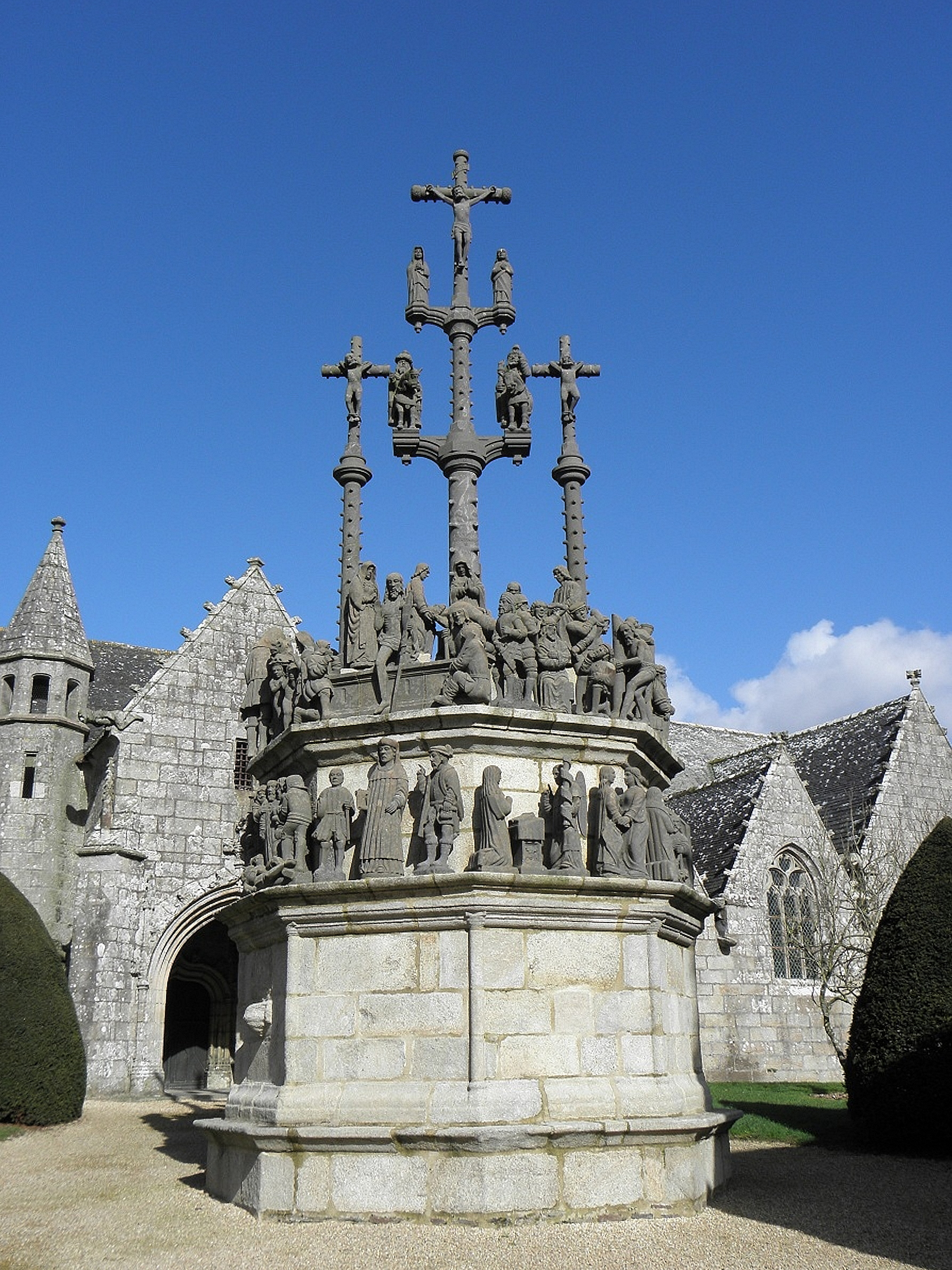
The Plougonven calvary. On the upper level is the resurrection scene, and on the left of that, the scene where Jesus is mocked and then where he is flogged. On the corniche below is St Yves standing between a rich man and a poor man. This is followed by a scene depicting the Annunciation then the visitation. St Yves was the patron saint of Plougonven

The Calvary at Plougonven (commune at Plougonven) is located within Brittany, France.

== Background ==
This calvary is part of the Plougonven "enclos paroissial". On an octagonal base, the structure is 4 metres high and on the two corniches running around this base are a series of sculptural groups which depict scenes from the life and death of Jesus Christ. Erected in 1554, the sculptural work was executed by the workshop of the "ymageurs", Bastien and Henry Prigent (see note 1) who also worked on the calvary at Pleyben. The calvary suffered considerable damage in 1794 during the aftermath of the French revolution after which the statues were hidden away in the cemetery grounds by the local people for safe-keeping. In 1810 the calvary was re-erected but with a wooden cross, this replaced in 1836 by a cross in stone. Then from 1897 to 1898, the sculptor Yann Larhantec carried out a substantial restoration, taken further in 2009 by Pierre Floc'h. The Calvary is dedicated to St Yves the parish's patron. The enclosure church itself dates to 1523 and is designed in the shape of a Latin cross with a nave and eight side chapels. It contains many sculptures and interesting features. The "enclos" was listed as an historic monument in 1916.

== The summit of the calvary ==
Three crosses reach up from the upper platform of the Calvary, that involving Jesus Christ's crucifixion and the crosses of the good and the bad robber. Jesus' cross has two crosspieces, on the first of which are back to back statues depicting the Virgin Mary with St Paul and his sword and John the Evangelist with St Peter and his key. On the second crosspiece are statues of two horsed cavaliers, St Longinus on the right of Jesus and St Stephaton, who reached up to Jesus with a sponge, on the left. These crosses and the statuary involved were created as part of Larhantec's restoration. There is a pietà at the base of the central cross showing the Virgin Mary distraught and in tears with the body of Jesus across her knee, her hands clasped together. She is surrounded by St John and Mary Magdalene. The pietà was the work of Bastien Prigent.

== The north west face ==
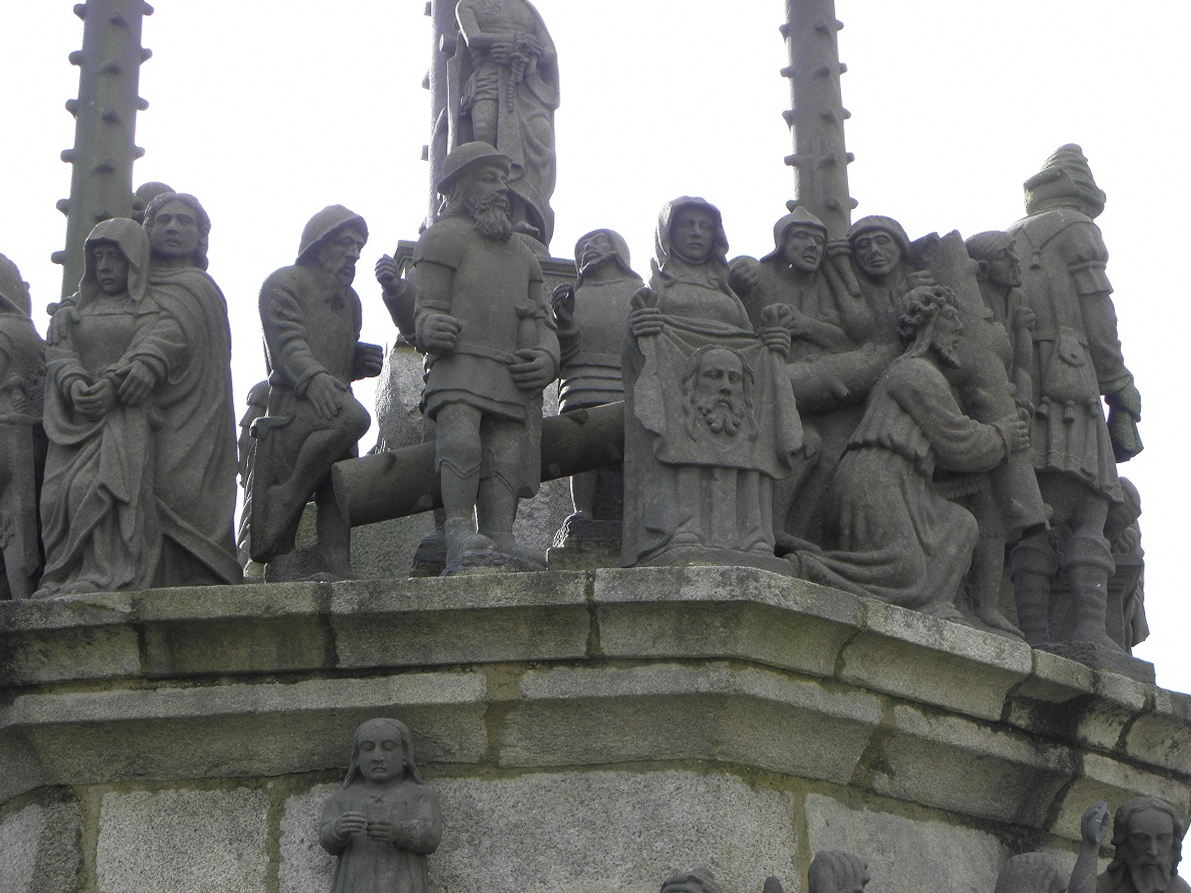
A closer view of the scene depicting Christ carrying the cross. John is supporting Mary, his right hand on her shoulder, then Jesus struggles to carry the cross helped by Simon of Cyrene surrounded by several soldiers. One soldier at the base of the cross rests his knee on the cross, no doubt to make it heavier. In the centre of this group, St Veronica holds up her veil that now carries Jesus' image. All the faces of the participants in the carrying of the cross scene were carved by Bastien Prigent.

On the upper platform, the subject dealt with is Christ carrying the cross, the composition including Jesus bending under the weight of the cross and accompanied by three Roman soldiers, Simon of Cyrene helping and holding a rope, St Veronica with her veil, another soldier, the Virgin Mary distraught and in tears, supported by John the Evangelist. To the right of the scene depicting Jesus carrying the cross is the "mise au tombeau"; Jesus being prepared for burial. On the lower corniche of the north west facing side, we commence with Jesus in discussion with the lawyers, John the Baptist baptizing Jesus (he wears an animal skin) whilst an angel holds Jesus' robe, Satan presenting bread to Jesus in the "temptation" scene and finally Jesus praying in Gethsemane with John the Evangelist asleep at his side.

- In the "mise au tombeau", seven people surround Jesus and against normal convention Nicodemus stands at Jesus' head whilst Joseph of Arimathea is at his feet. John the Evangelist, the Virgin Mary, a female saint and Mary Magdalene look down on the body whilst Gamaliel is shown to be speaking with his index finger placed on his thumb. All have three tears running down each cheek. The "mise au tombeau" is the work of Bastien Prigent.

== Images of statues on the north west face ==
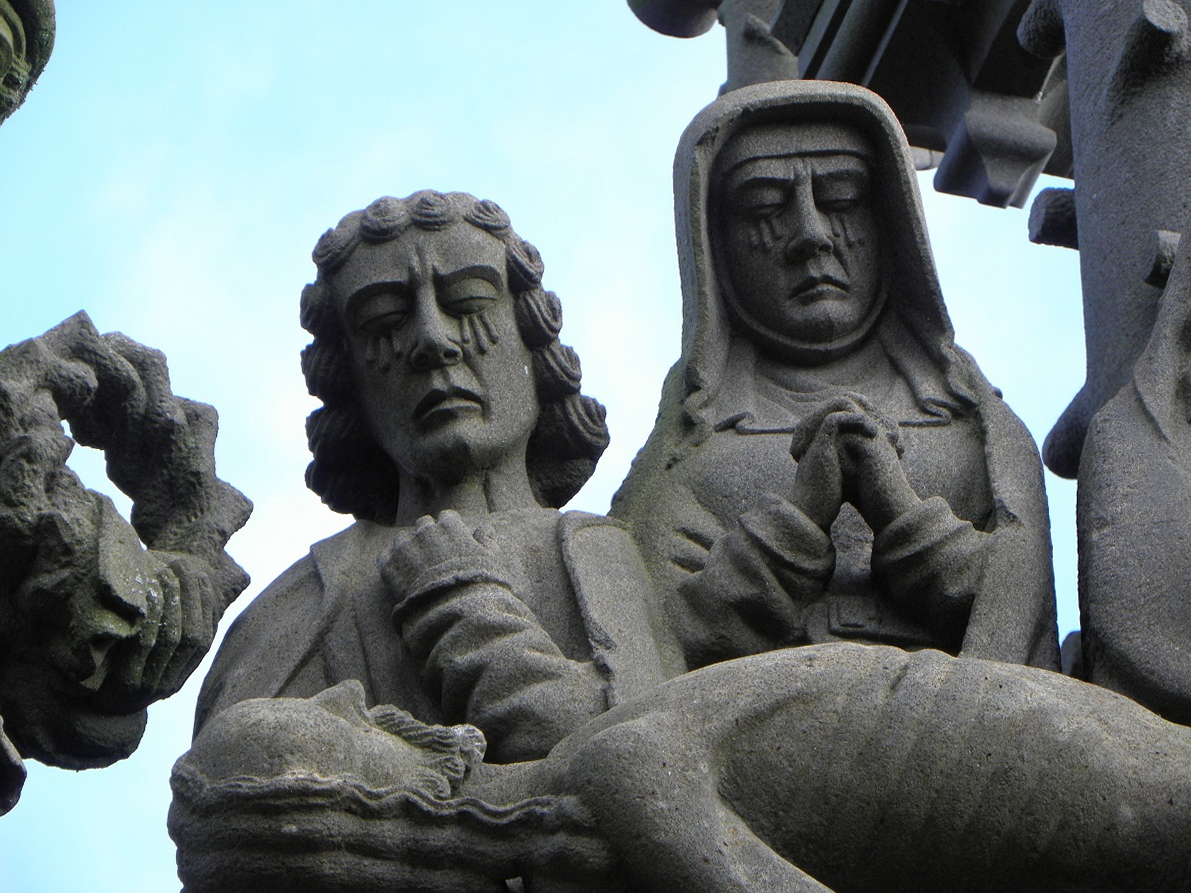
Tears run down the cheeks of two of the onlookers at the "mise au tombeau".

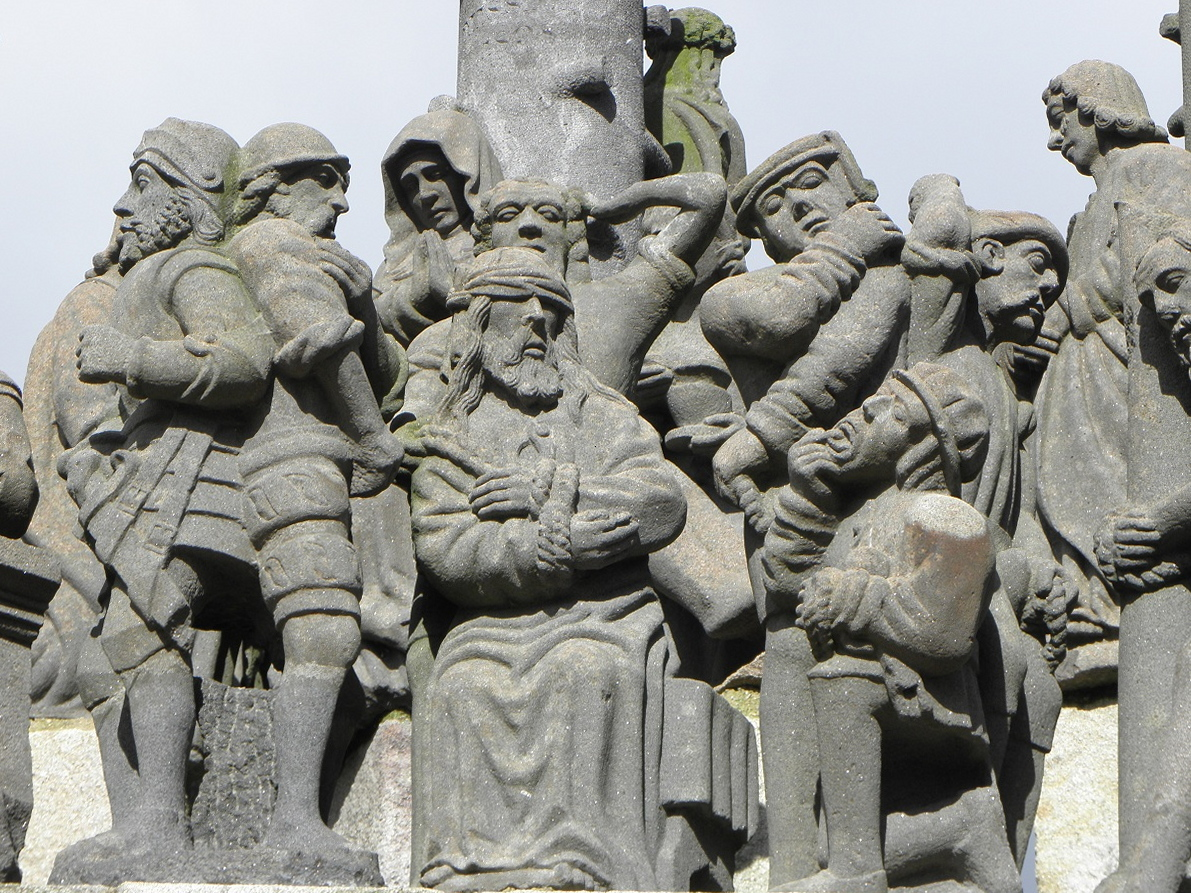
Christ is mocked by a group of soldiers ("Christ aux outrages")

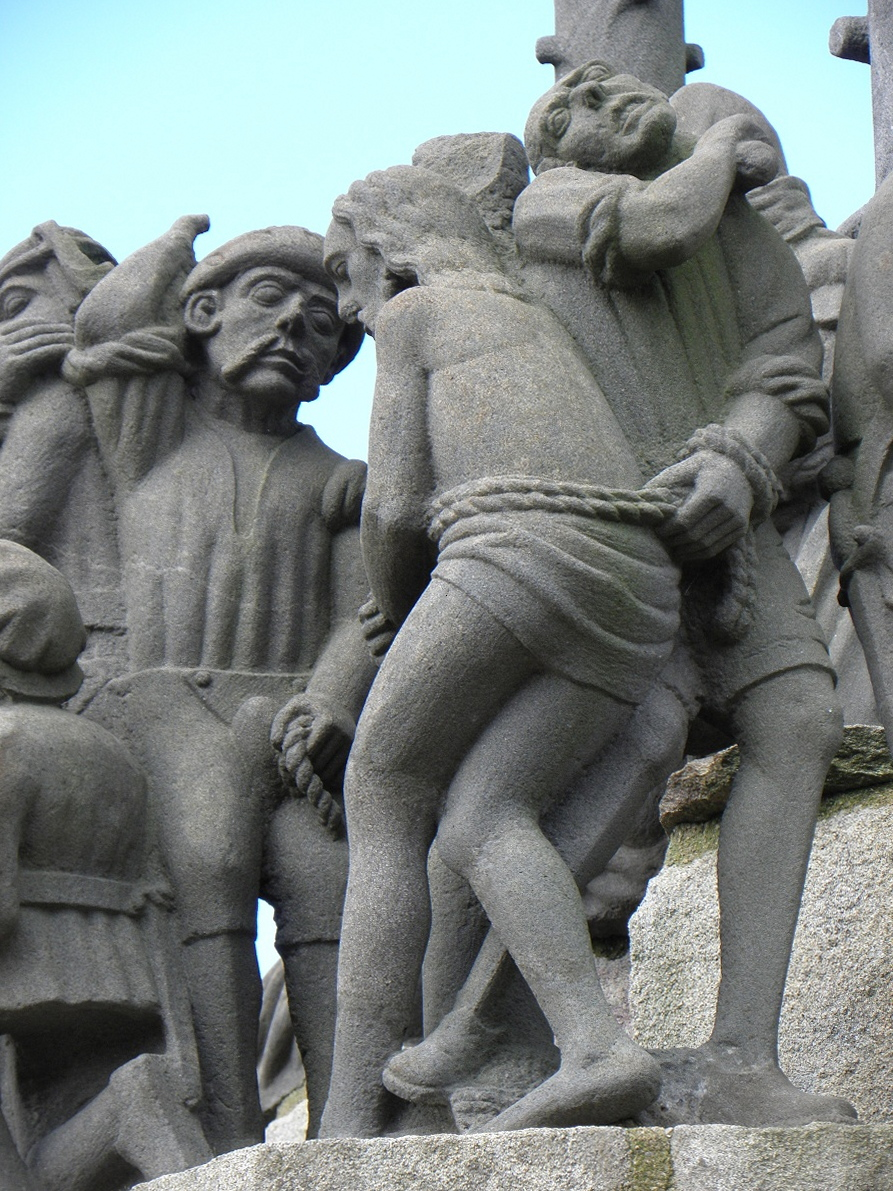
Jesus is flogged.

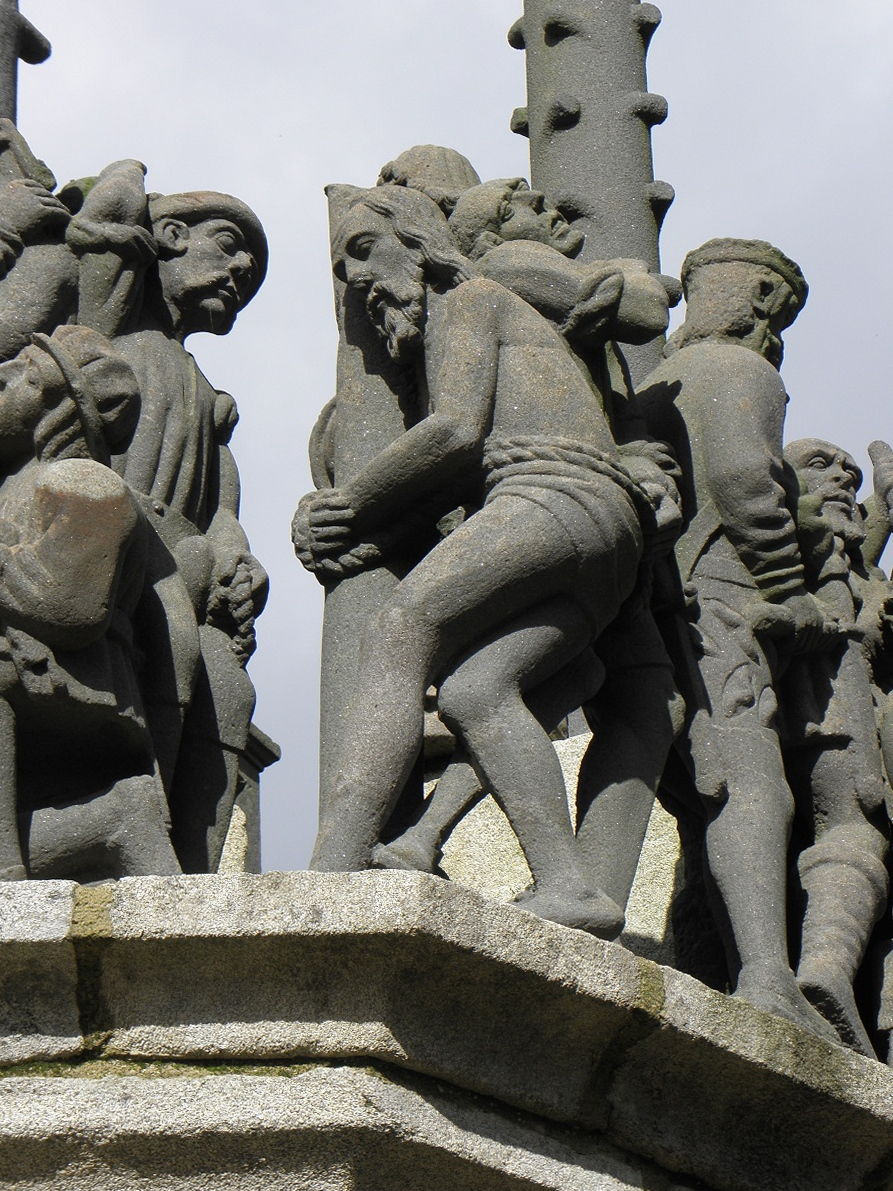
Another view of Jesus being flogged.

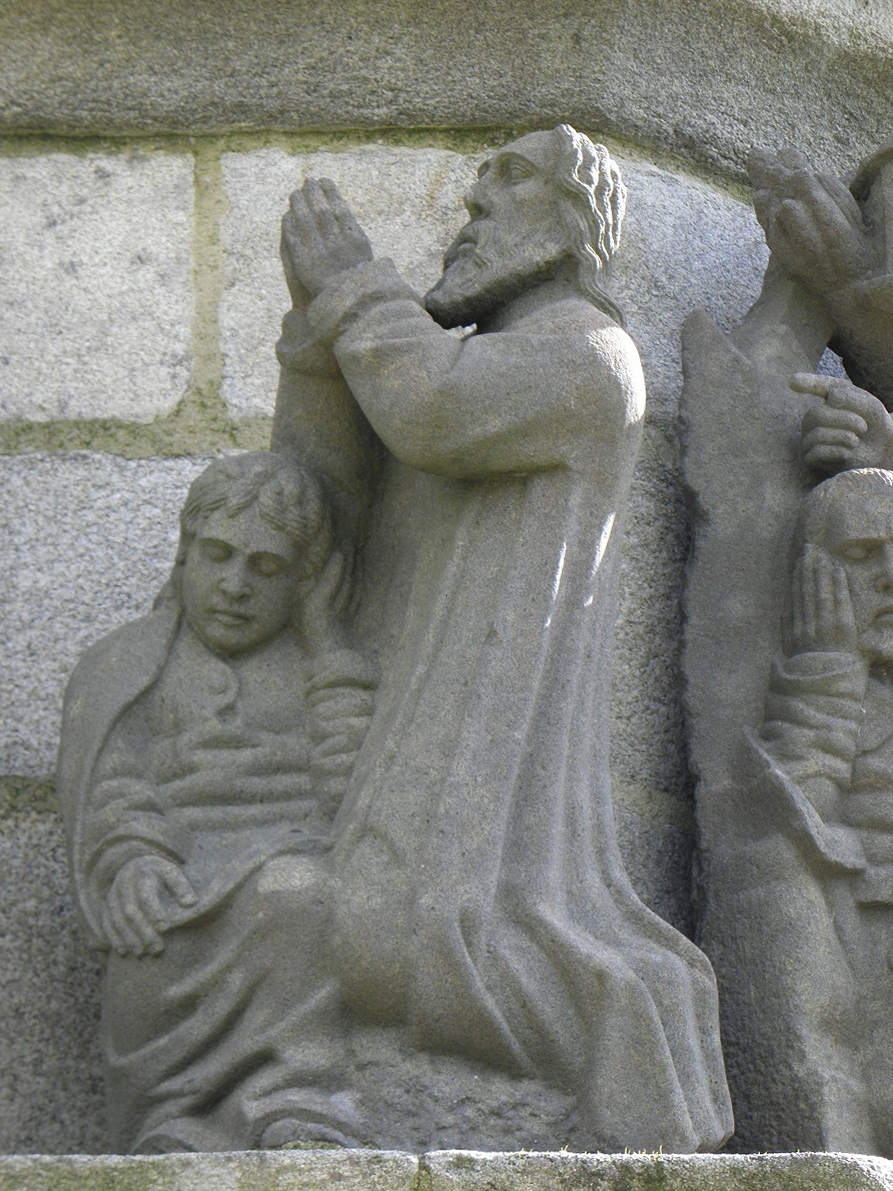
Jesus praying in the garden of Gethsemane.

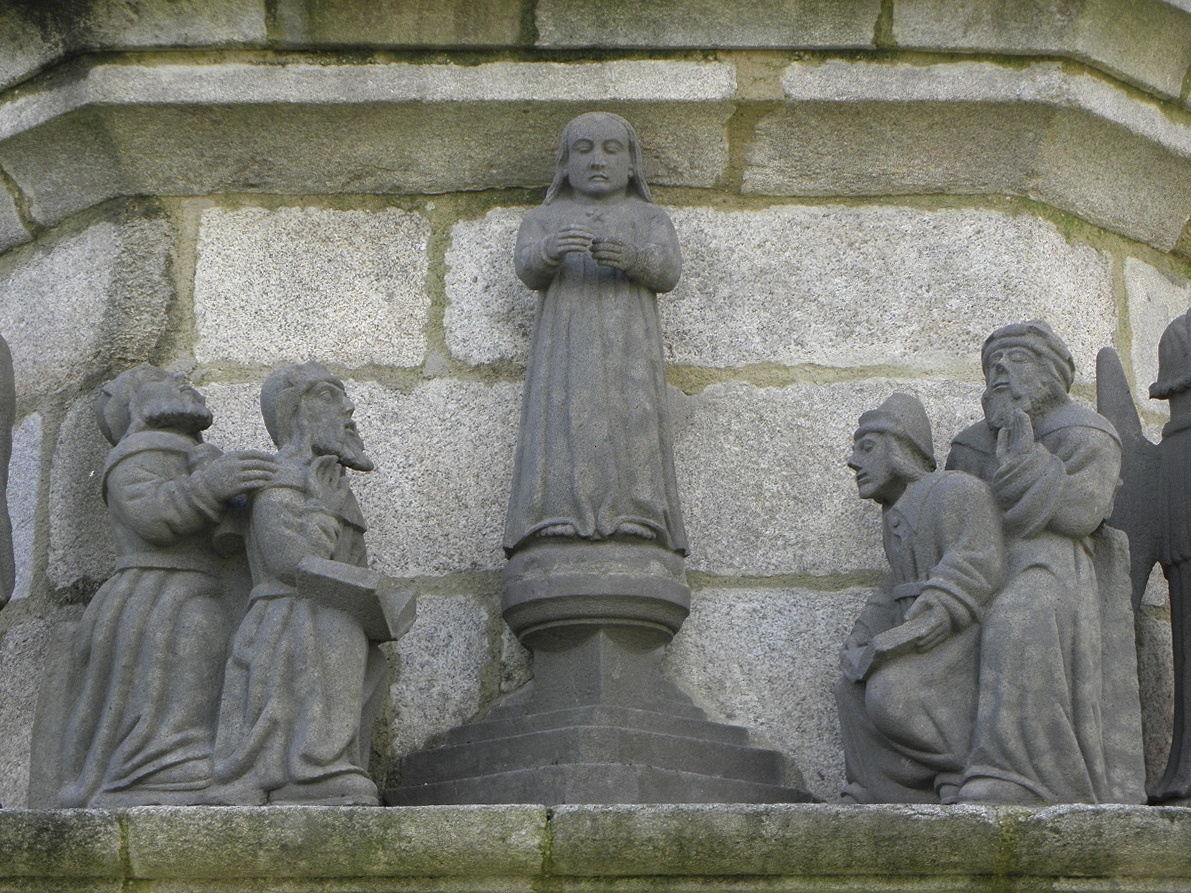
The young Jesus speaking with the lawyers in the temple

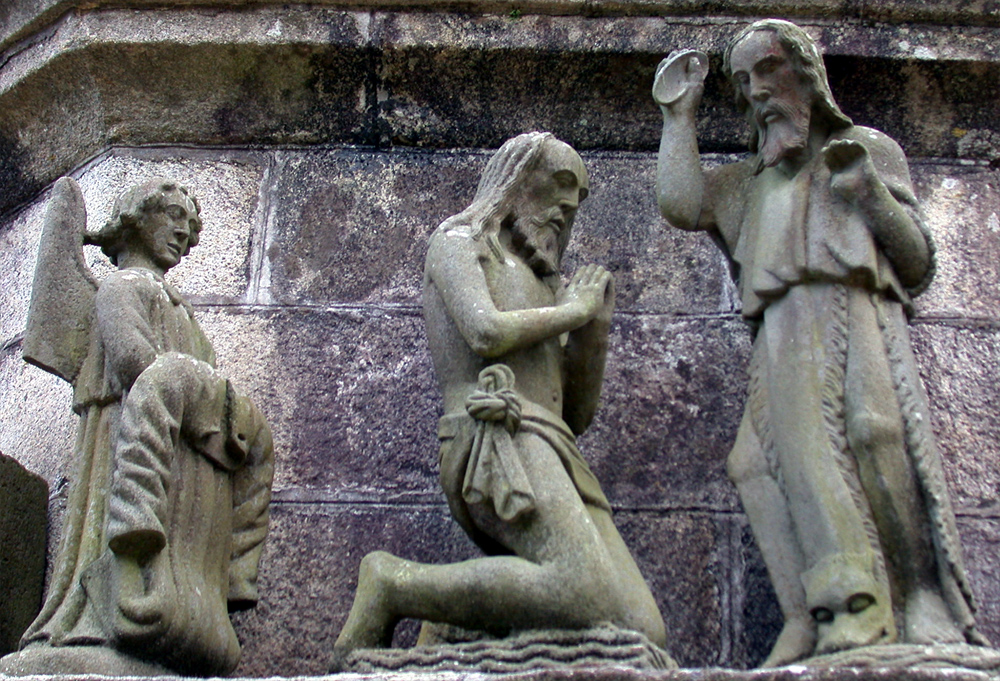
Jesus being baptized by John the Baptist who is wearing an animal skin. The animal's head is at John the Baptist's feet. An angel kneels on the left side of the scene. She is holding Jesus' robe.

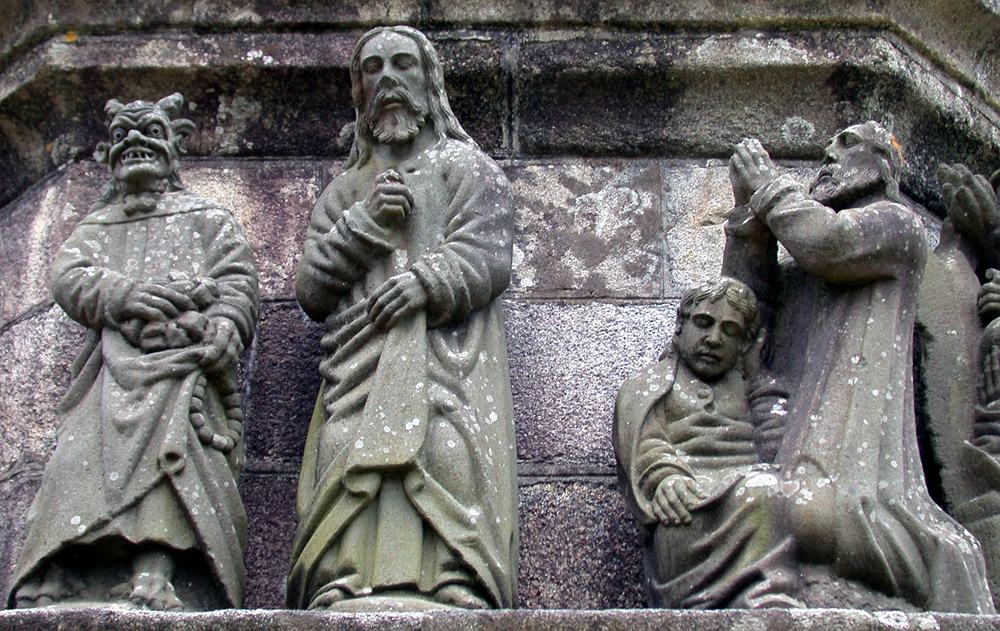
On the left is a depiction of Satan tempting Jesus and offering him bread. He has lifted his cloak and we can see his cloven feet. On the right is Jesus praying in the garden of Gethsemane. The apostle St John is fast asleep at his feet, his head cupped in his left hand. All the sculpture here is by Bastien Prigent although Yan Larhantec re-sculpted Satan's head.

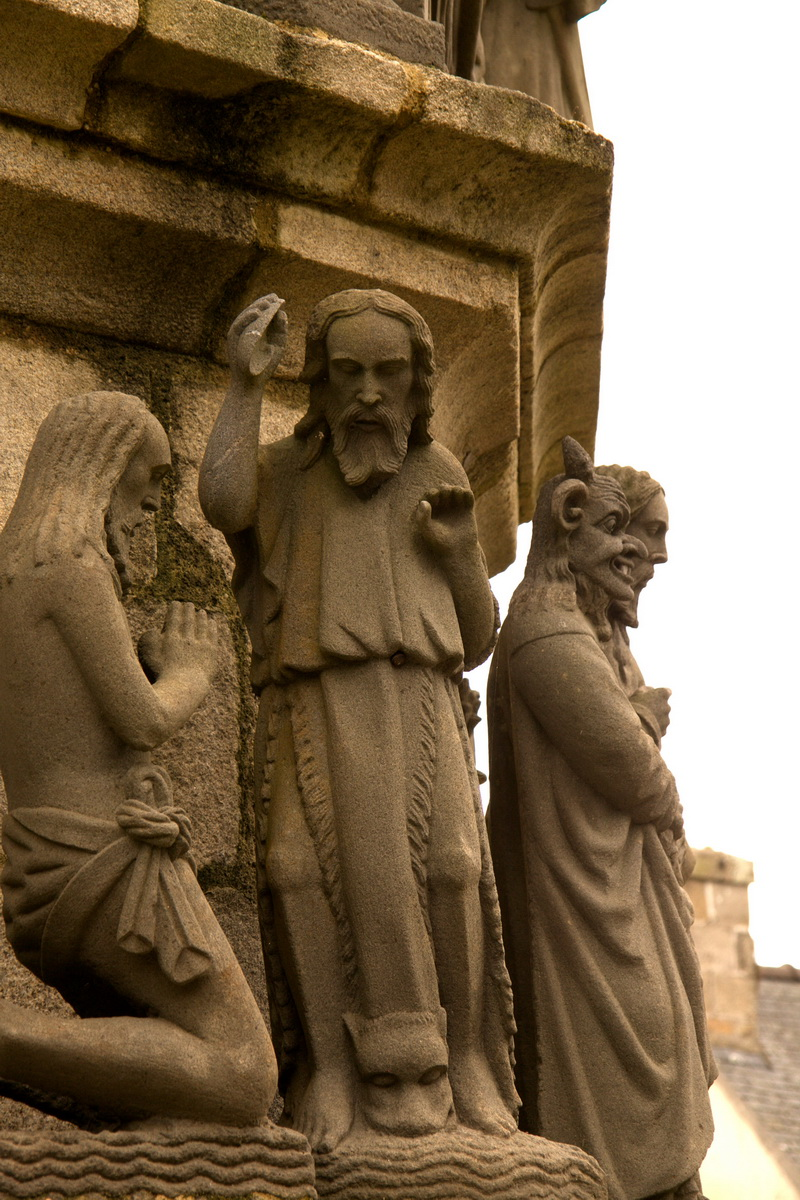
Jesus baptized by John the Baptist

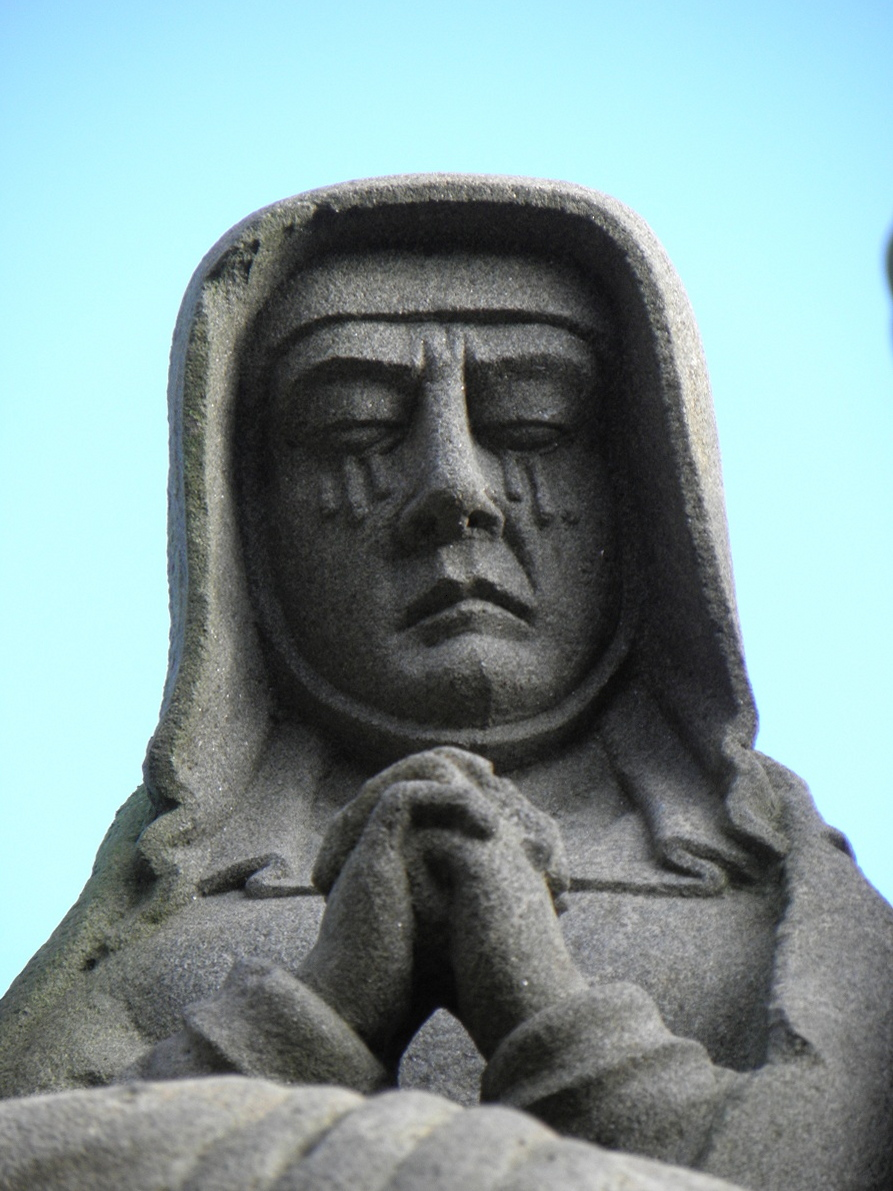
Tears falling at the "mise au tombeau"

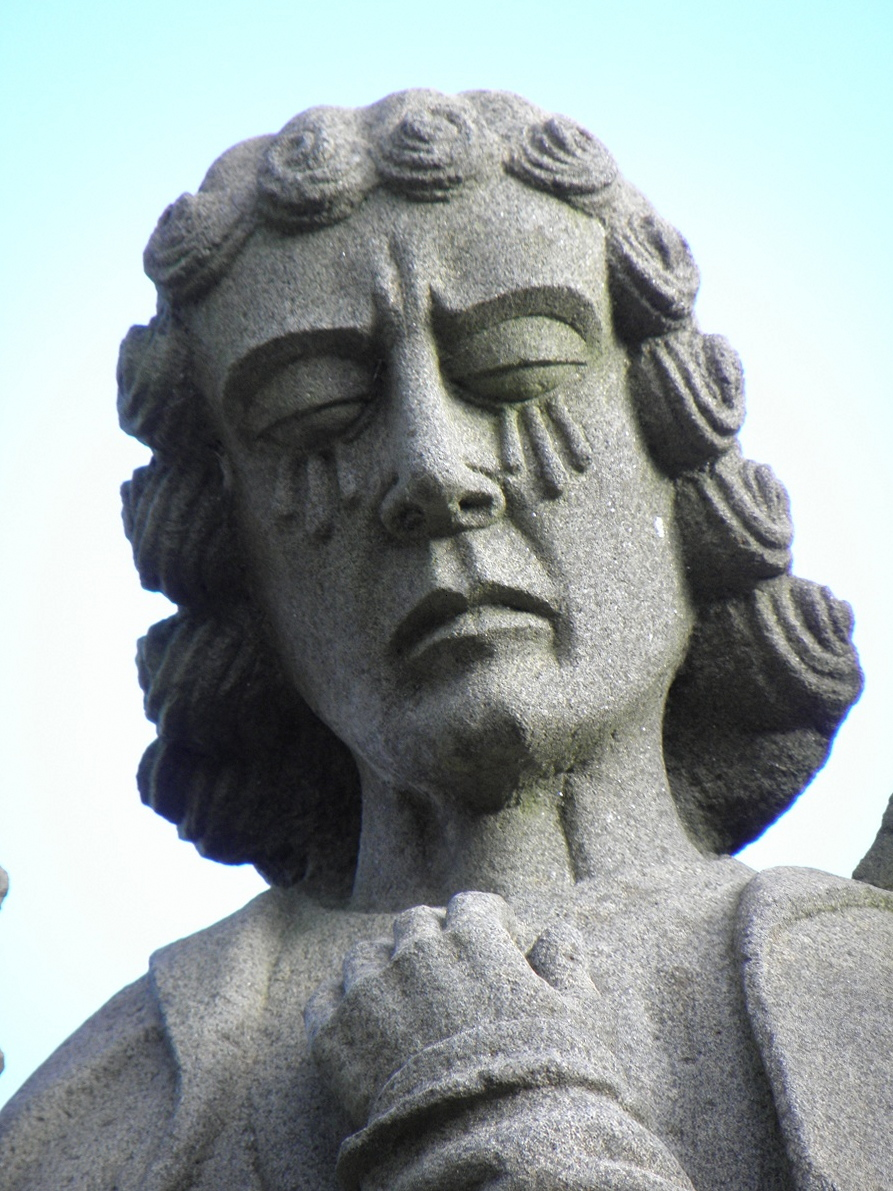
Tears falling at the "mise au tombeau"

== The south east face ==
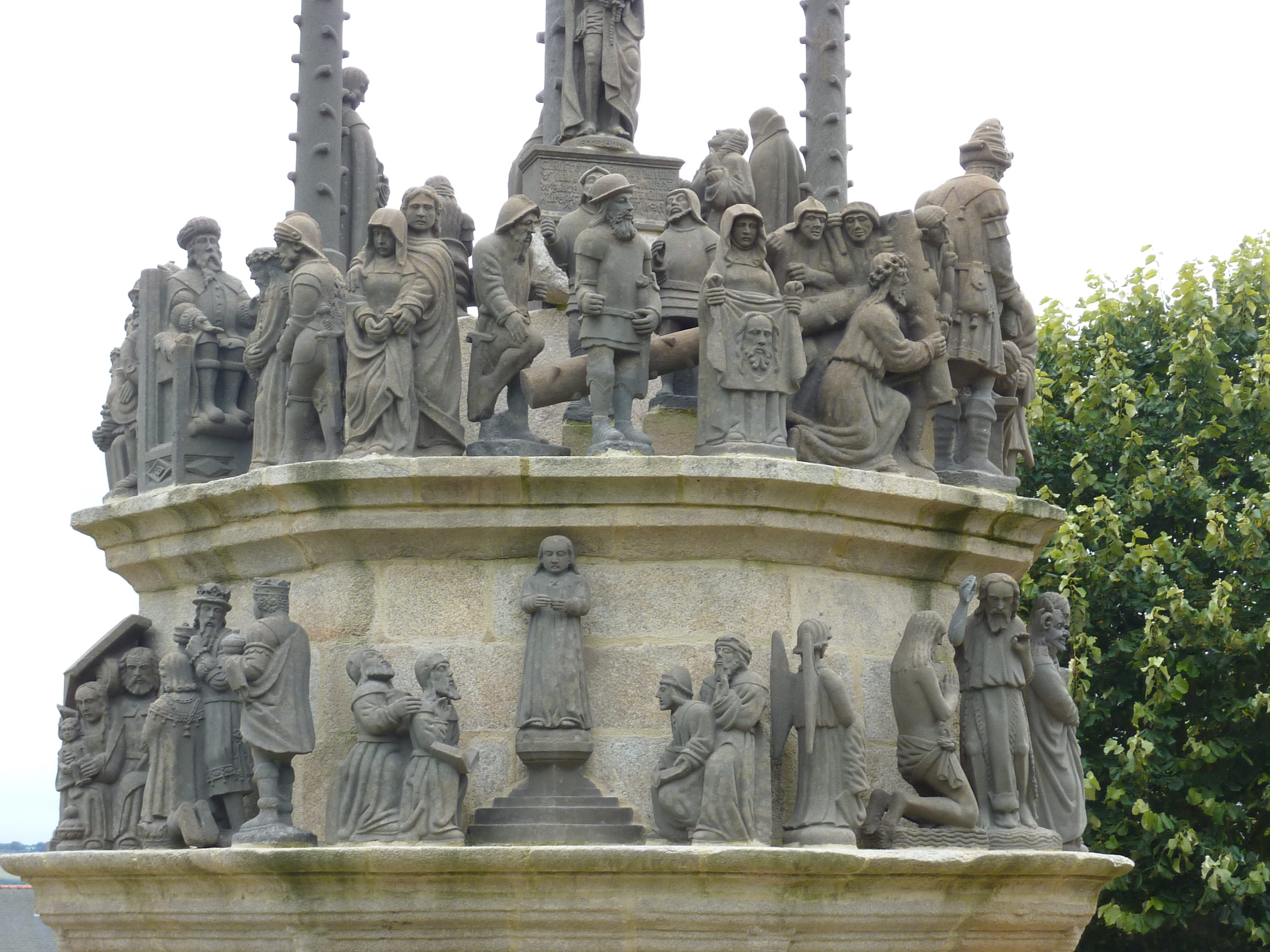
A view of part of the Plougonven calvary. On the upper level left is Jesus brought before Pontius Pilate by two guards. Pilate sits on his throne. This is followed by the scene depicting Christ carrying the cross commencing with John the Evangelist supporting the Virgin Mary. On the corniche below and starting on the left side we have the Nativity and the Adoration of the Magi scenes, then St Yves surrounded by a rich man and a poor man and finish on the right side with Jesus being baptized by John the Baptist watched by a kneeling angel who is carrying Jesus' robe. We finally catch the edge of the statue of Satan in the "temptation" scene

On the upper platform we have a scene showing four soldiers applying the Crown of thorns to Jesus' head, Jesus brought before Pontius Pilate behind whom a servant prepares a towel and a pitcher of water from which Pilate will subsequently wash his hands, whilst a soldier waits and we finish with three soldiers leading Jesus off, Pilate having declared his verdict. On the lower corniche we have depictions of the Nativity, the Adoration of the Magi and Jesus talking with the lawyers.

- In the Nativity scene Jesus lies on some straw surrounded by his parents who are kneeling. Jesus holds a terrestrial globe in his left hand and gives a blessing with his right hand. It was Bastien Prigent who executed the Nativity scene. Henry had sculpted that at Pleyben.
- The Adoration of the Magi scene is the work of Bastien Prigent, as was the case with the Pleyben calvary.
- In the scene where Jesus is in discussion with lawyers in the temple, Jesus is standing on a pedestal as was the case at Pleyben. This helps to underline his ascendancy. At Plougonven, there are four lawyers, two on each side of Jesus whilst at Pleyben there were just two, one each side of Jesus. At Plougonven the sculpture of this scene was divided between the two Prigent brothers, Bastien sculpted the figure of Jesus, Henry the rest.
- The scene showing Jesus being baptized by John the Baptist was not repeated at Pleyben. John pours the Jordan river water used in the ceremony from a shell. Jesus is kneeling and the sculptor carves stripes into the ground to suggest the waters of the river Jordan.
- In the scene depicting Satan tempting Jesus, Larhantec had to redo the devil's head and critics have been complimentary as to the way this head integrates with the existing body sculpted by the Prigents. The devil pulls up his robe slightly to show his cloven feet.
- In the scene depicting Jesus' arrest, Judas stands beneath Malchus' lantern holding his purse. Peter and James are sleeping but Peter's hand rests on his sword. Judas appears again when Jesus is shown standing between two soldiers who have arrested him. Judas leans towards Jesus ready to kiss him and thus betray his identity. Then is Peter with Malchus crying out in pain laying at his feet, a hand to the wound where Peter had cut off his ear.
- In the scene showing Jesus being mocked, one of the soldiers is carved back to back with another looking in at the "mise au tombeau" scene.

== Images of statues on the south east face ==
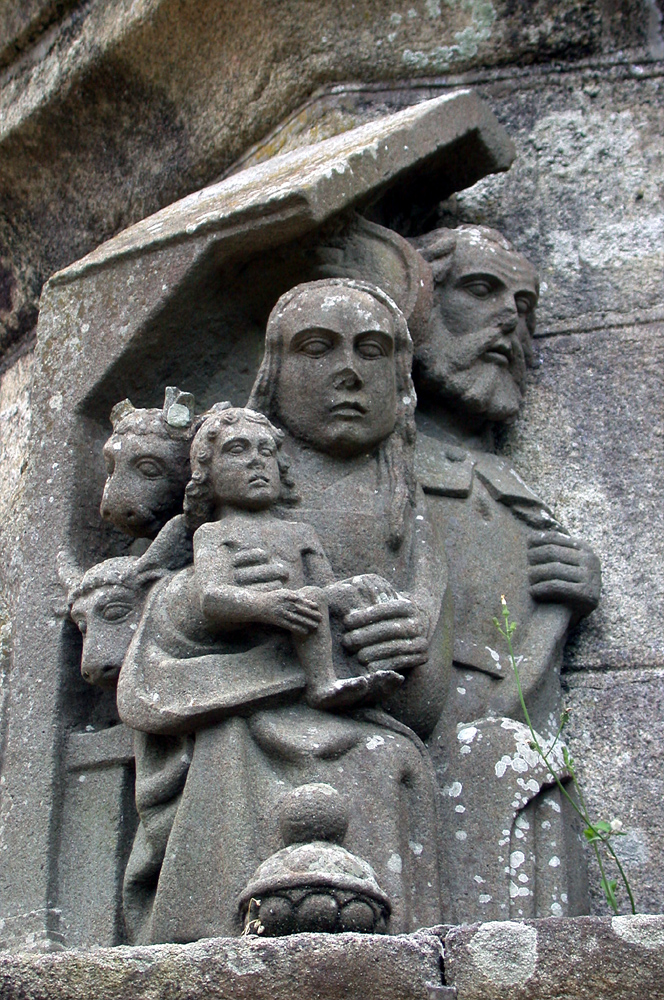
Mary and Joseph look out from the stable. Mary is holding the baby Jesus. The heads of the donkey and the cow poke out behind them

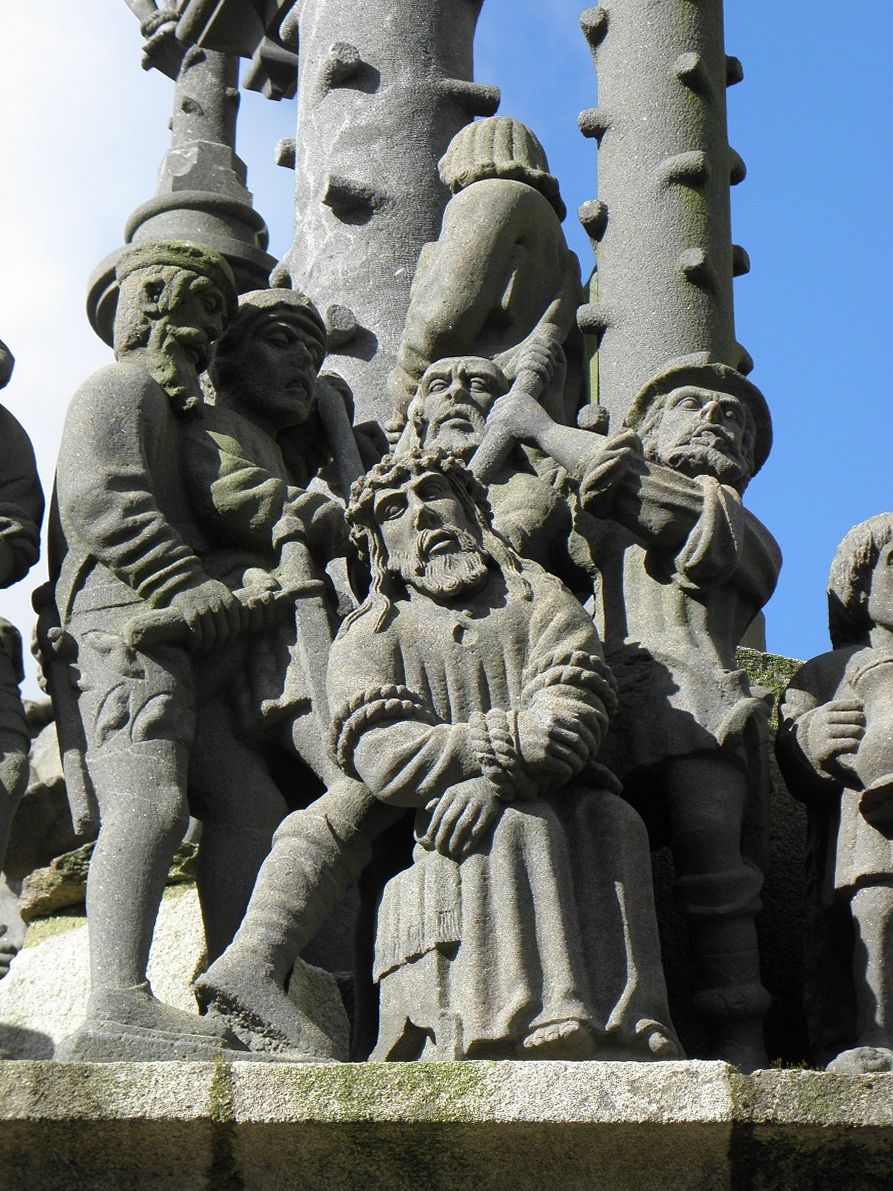
Soldiers manhandle Jesus and force the Crown of thorns down on his head

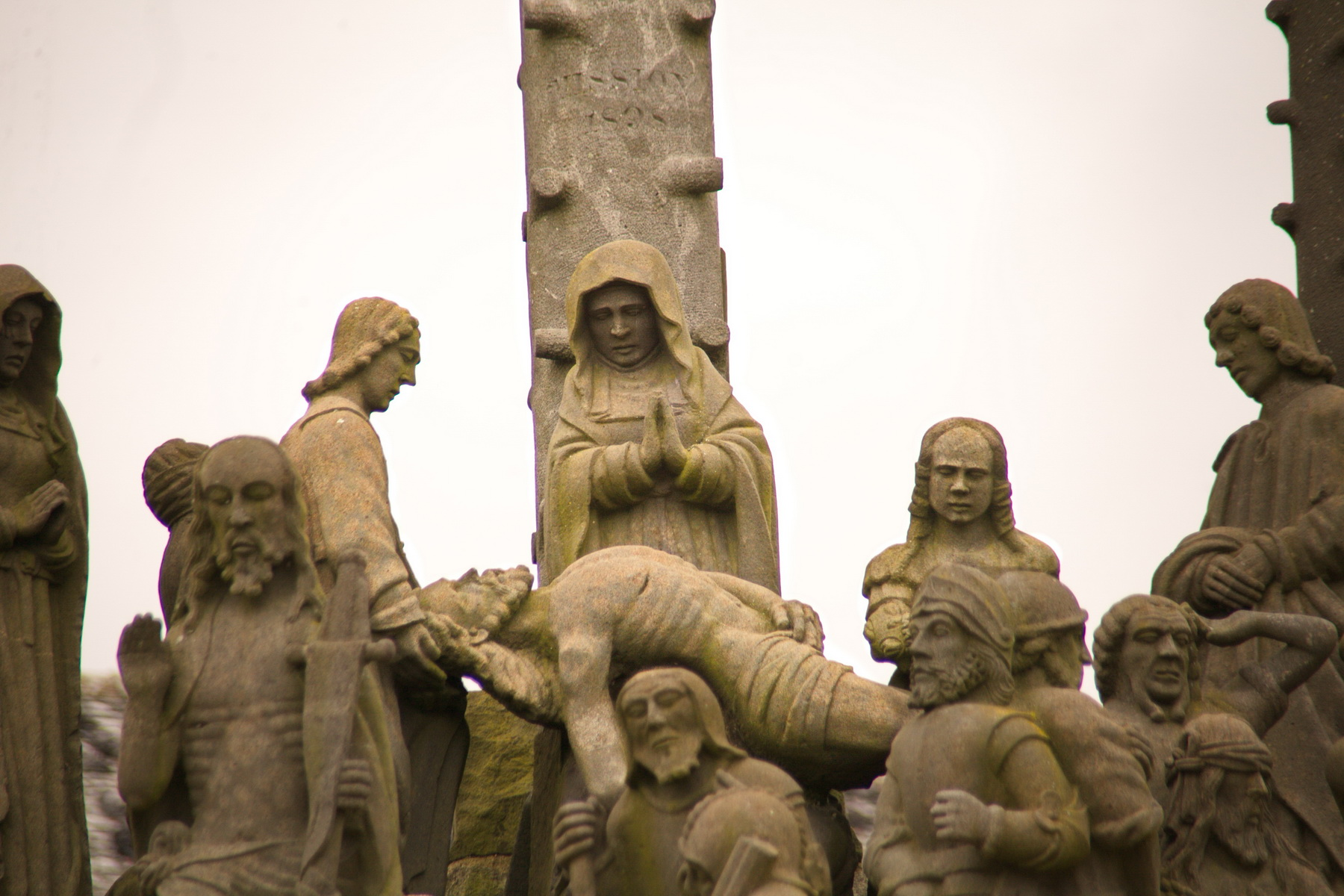
Jesus' body has been brought down from the cross

== The south face ==
At the foot of Jesus' cross there is a statue depicting a kneeling Mary Magdalene. In front of her is the Resurrection scene with Jesus emerging from his Sarcophagus, his right hand raised and giving a blessing and a "Resurrection cross" or "Triumphal cross" in his left hand. A kneeling soldier sleeps on the right hand side of the tomb and another soldier, also sleeping, sits to the right, holding on to a musket, an anachronism explained by the fact that this part of the scene was by Larhantec. Behind him two other soldiers look on. On the right of the resurrection scene is Jesus being mocked and ridiculed by four soldiers ("Christ aux outrages") and then a scene showing Jesus being flogged. Next to the depiction of Mary Magdalene at the foot of the cross is a pietà and around this are the figure of a standing man and John the Evangelist. On the other side of the cross from the pietả, there is an "Ecce Homo". To the right of the pietả there is a depiction of the open mouth of Hell Harrowing of Hell. Adam has already emerged but a demon is stopping Eve from joining him. On the lower corniche the depiction of Jesus' arrest includes Judas Iscariot shown holding a purse, St Peter asleep by the side of a colleague then Peter drawing his sword, Malchus struck and falling to the ground and Judas embracing Jesus. These sculptures are then followed by a depiction of St Yves standing between a depiction of a rich man and a poor man. We finish with a depiction of the Annunciation and finally the Visitation (Christianity)

- Bastien Prigent carried out the work on the scene depicting the descent into hell. The mouth has teeth unlike that at Pleyben and dragons guard it. A demon armed with a fork tries to stop Eve leaving. Adam is slumped in Jesus' arms having already left.
- In the Annunciation scene, the angel of the Annunciation leans on one knee and holds a banner saying " AVE MARIA GRATIA PLENA". The Virgin Mary kneels before a Prie-dieu with hands clasped. There is a face carved on the side of the Prie-dieu.
- The "Visitation" scene was the work of Henry Prigent who also executed this scene for the Pleyben calvary.

== Notes ==
Note 1. The brothers Bastien and Henry Prigent were sculptors whose workshop was active between 1527 and 1577. Best known for their work on the great monumental calvaries of Pleyben dedicated to St Yves and Plougonven dedicated to St Germain and statuary in the church porches of Pencran, Landivisiau and Guipavas plus the decoration to the upper part of the porch at Lampaul-Guimiliau. They were also responsible for sculptural decoration on some smaller calvaries and crosses. The Prigent workshop also worked on the gisant of Laurent Richard at Plouvien.

Note 2. Yan Larhantec's restoration involved work on up to thirty of the existing sculptures and the three crosses were entirely his work. Only the two cavaliers on one of the central crosses' crosspiece were original. Larhantec strove to replicate the style of the Prigent brothers. The dedication inscription has been moved during the various restorations and repairs and is now located at the back of the base of the central cross. It reads

"CESTE CROIX FVST FAYTE EN LAN MIL/VCL111 A L'HONNEUR DE DIEV ET N[O]TRE DA[M]E/DE PITIE ET MONSEIGNEVR SAINCT/YVES: PRIES DIEV P[O]VR LES TRESP/ASSES"

== Images of statues on the south face ==
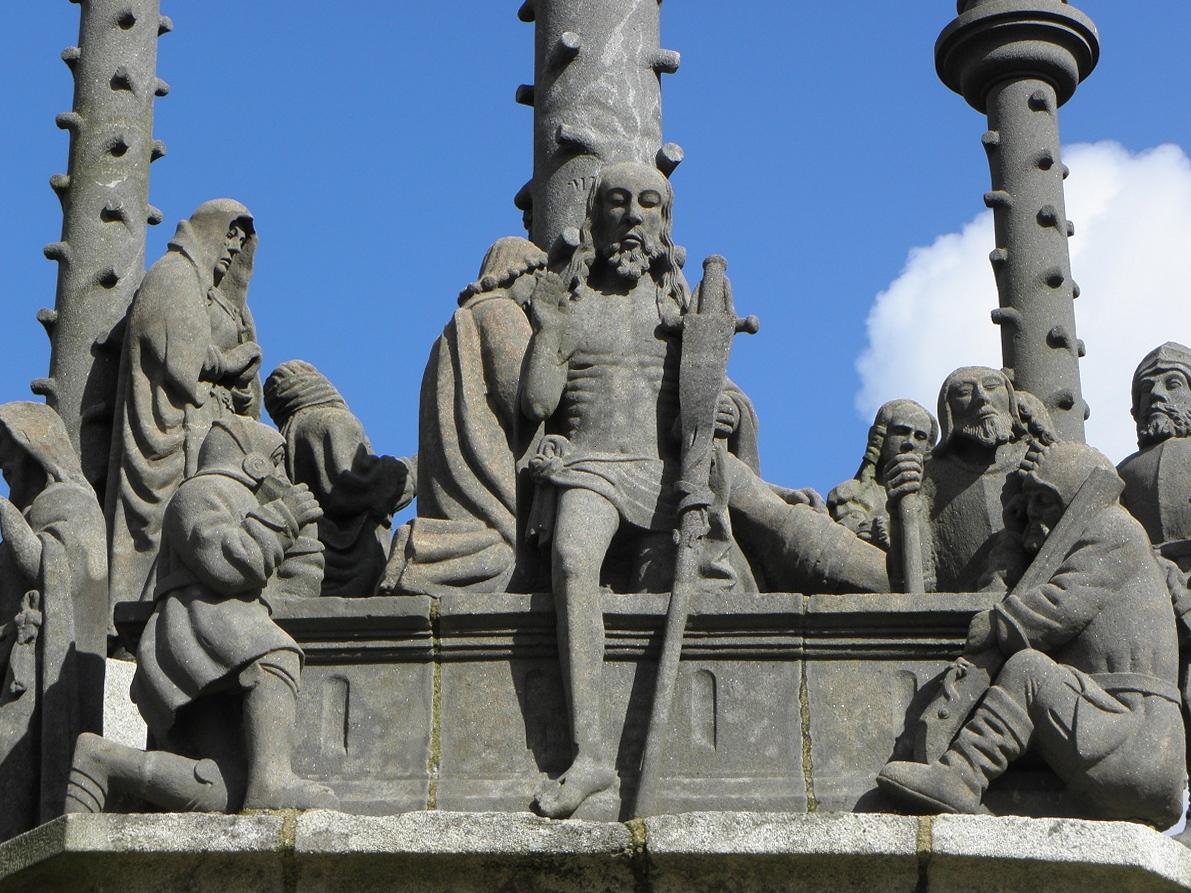
Jesus steps from his tomb in the scene at Plougonven depicting the resurrection. He gives a blessing with his right hand and he carries a cross in his left hand. Beside the tomb two soldiers sit sleeping.

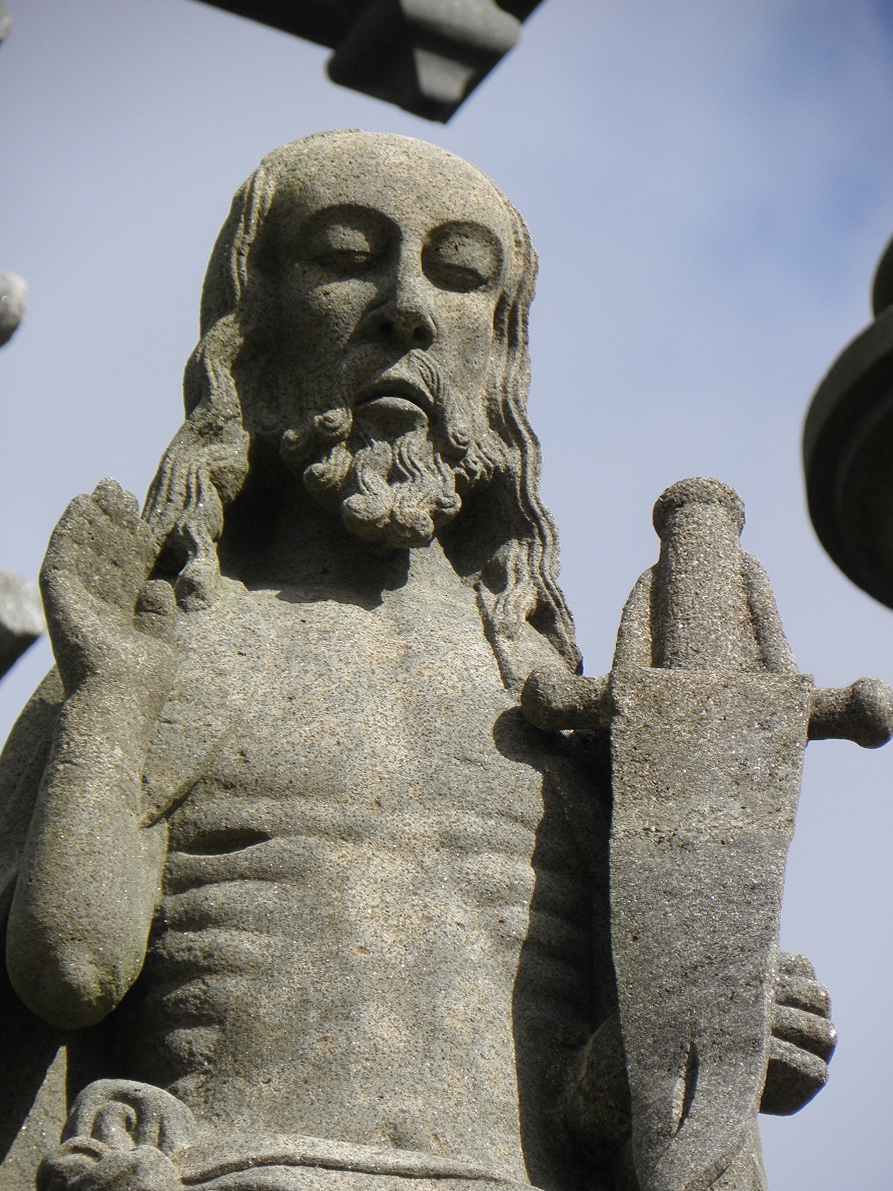
Jesus has emerged from the tomb and gives a blessing with his right hand whilst in his left hand he holds a "triumphal cross"

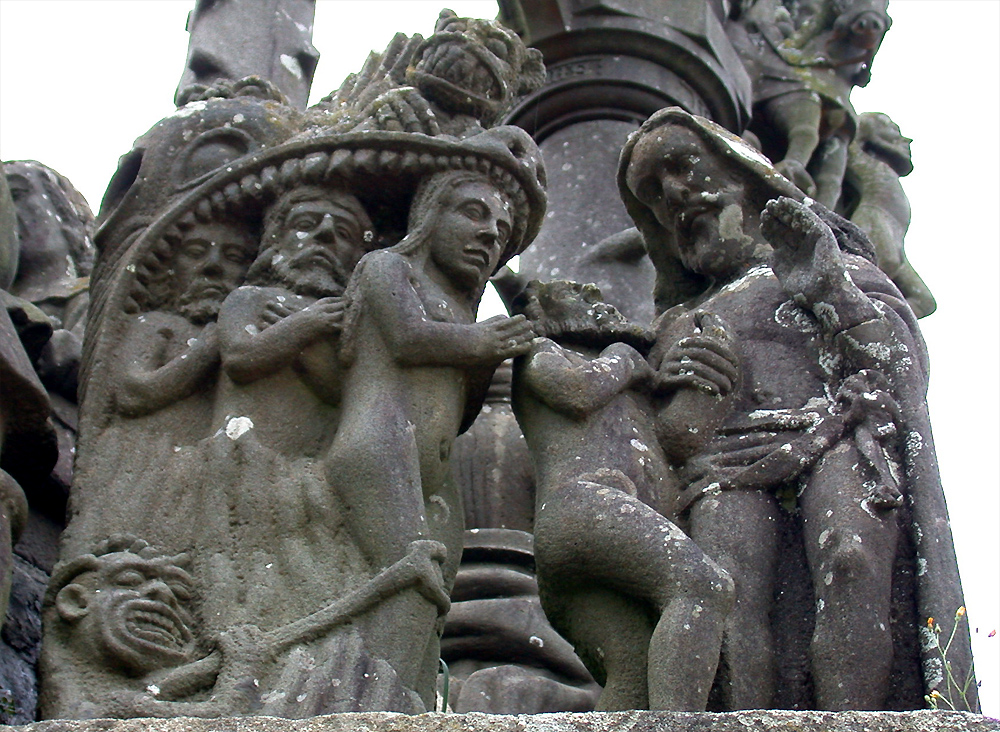
Jesus has already rescued Adam from the mouth of hell, and a demon wraps his fork around Eve's leg to try to stop her leaving. Two other lost souls wait their chance to escape. A dragon sits at the top of the mouth.

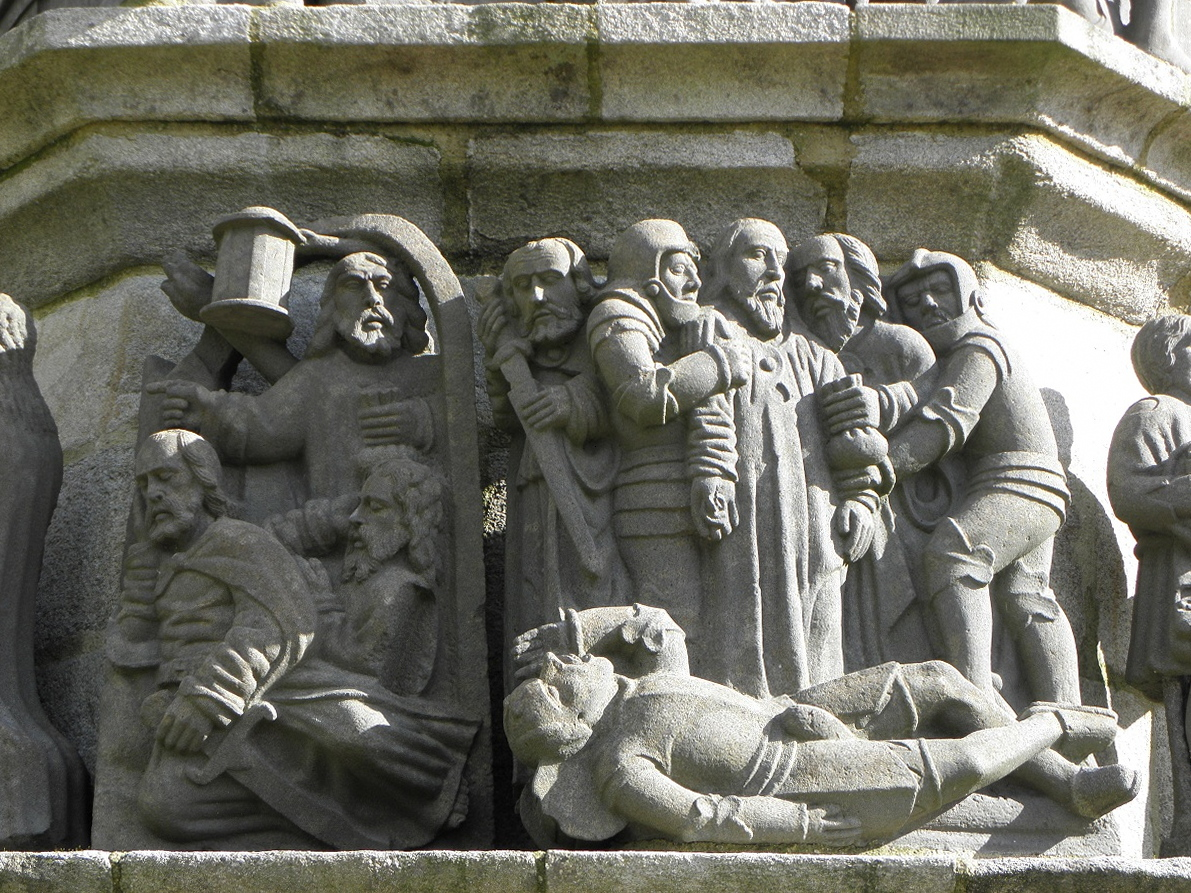
Jesus' arrest.This sculpture on the Plougonven calvary's south side depicts Jesus' arrest. On the left is Judas Iscariot holding a purse and below him an apostle sleeping, whilst a second, St Peter is also asleep his hand on his sword. Then is Judas embracing Jesus to identify him. He is held by two guards. St Peter now puts his sword back in its sheath having struck Malchus who lies on the floor

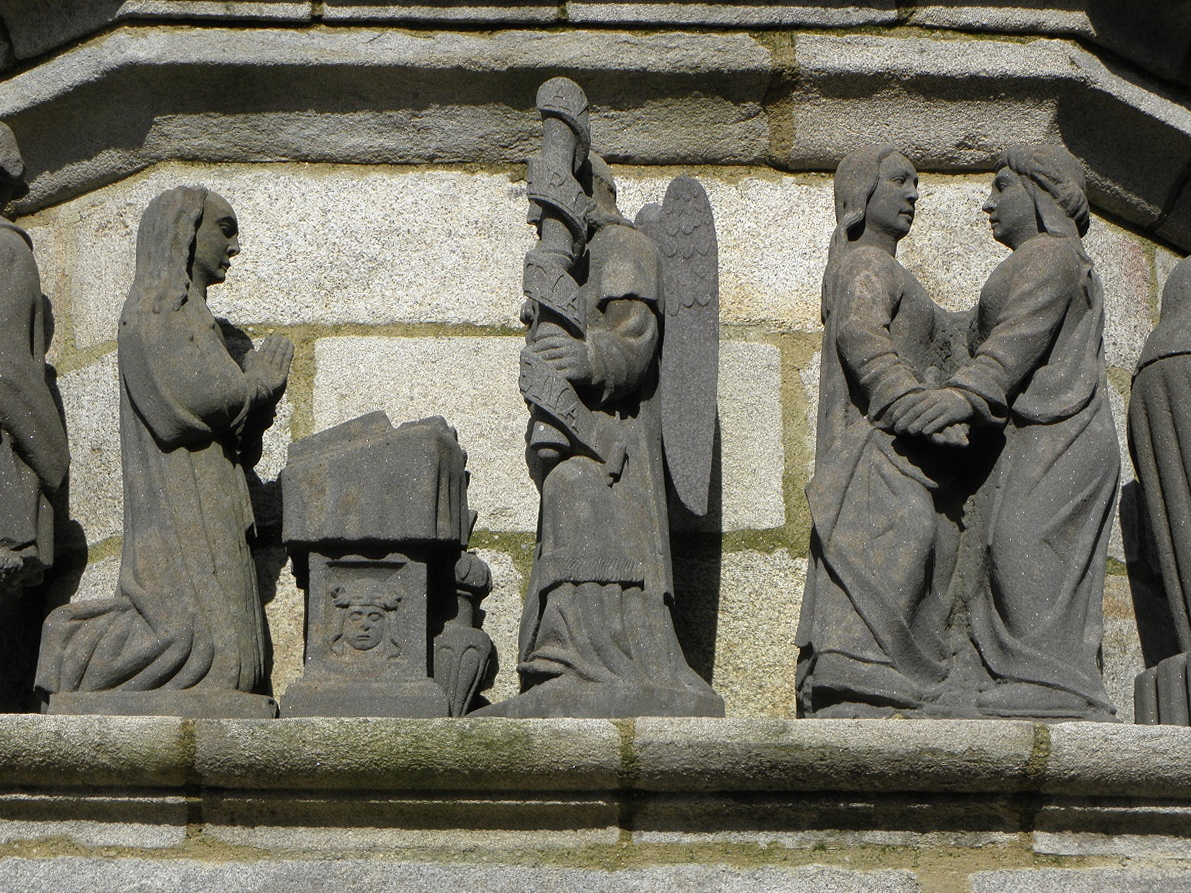
The Annunciation and the Visitation

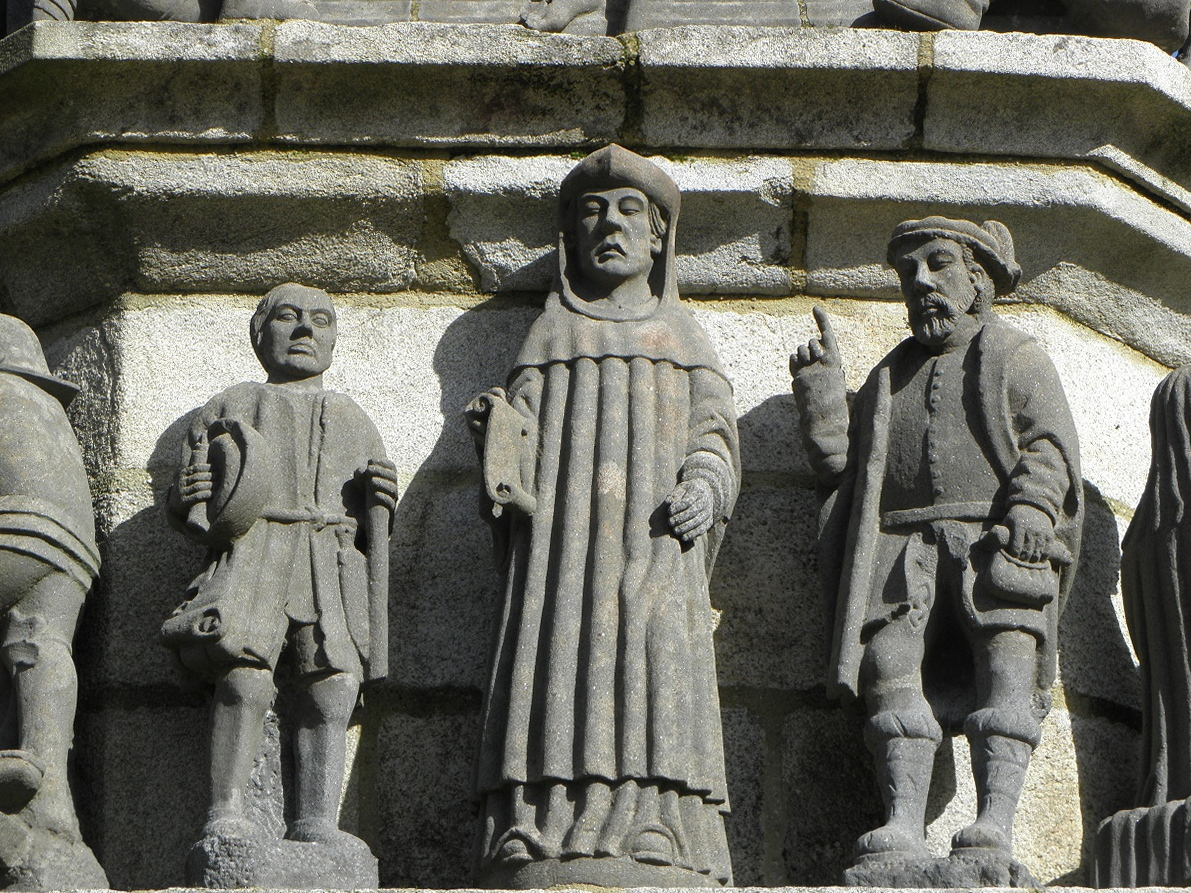
St Yves stands between a poor and a rich man.

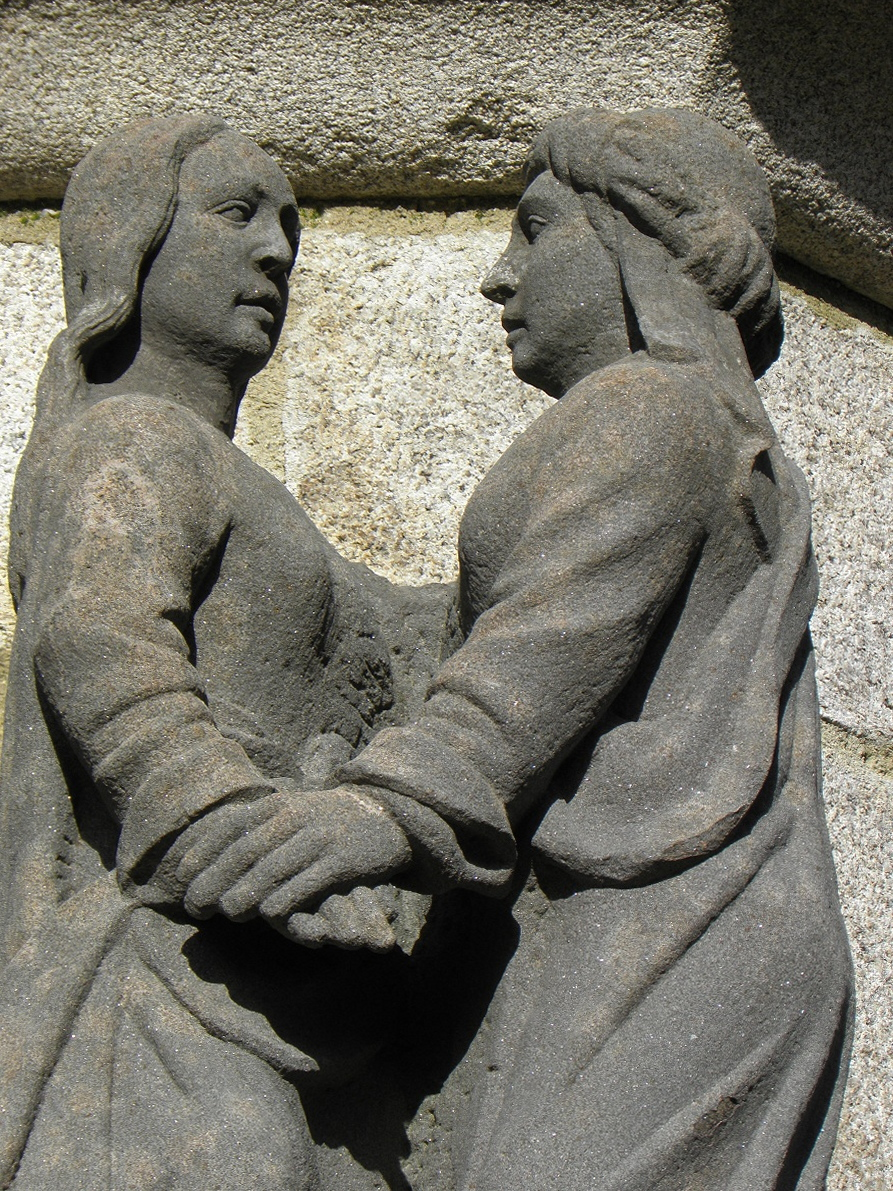
A depiction of the Visitation (Christianity) with Mary meeting Elizabeth.

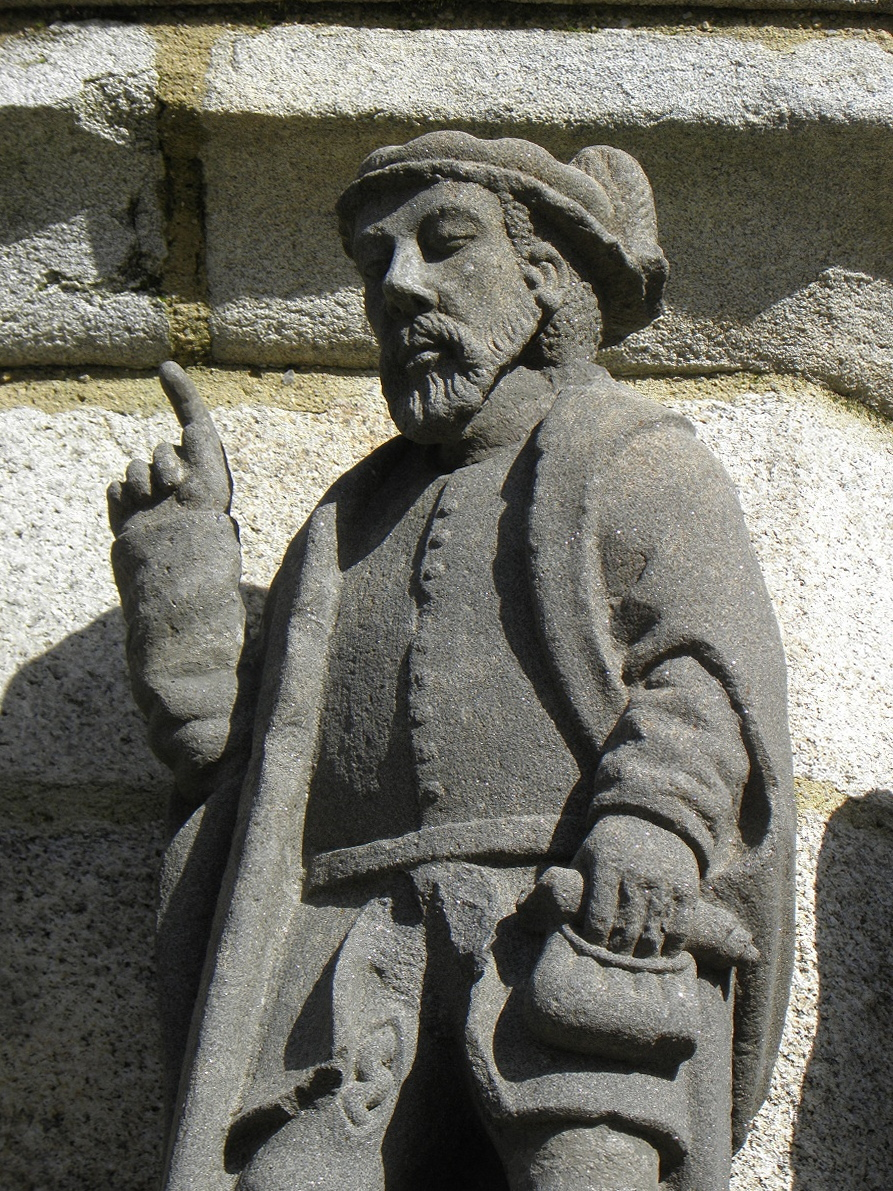
The rich man standing next to St Yves. Part of the scene where St Yves stands between a poor and a rich man.

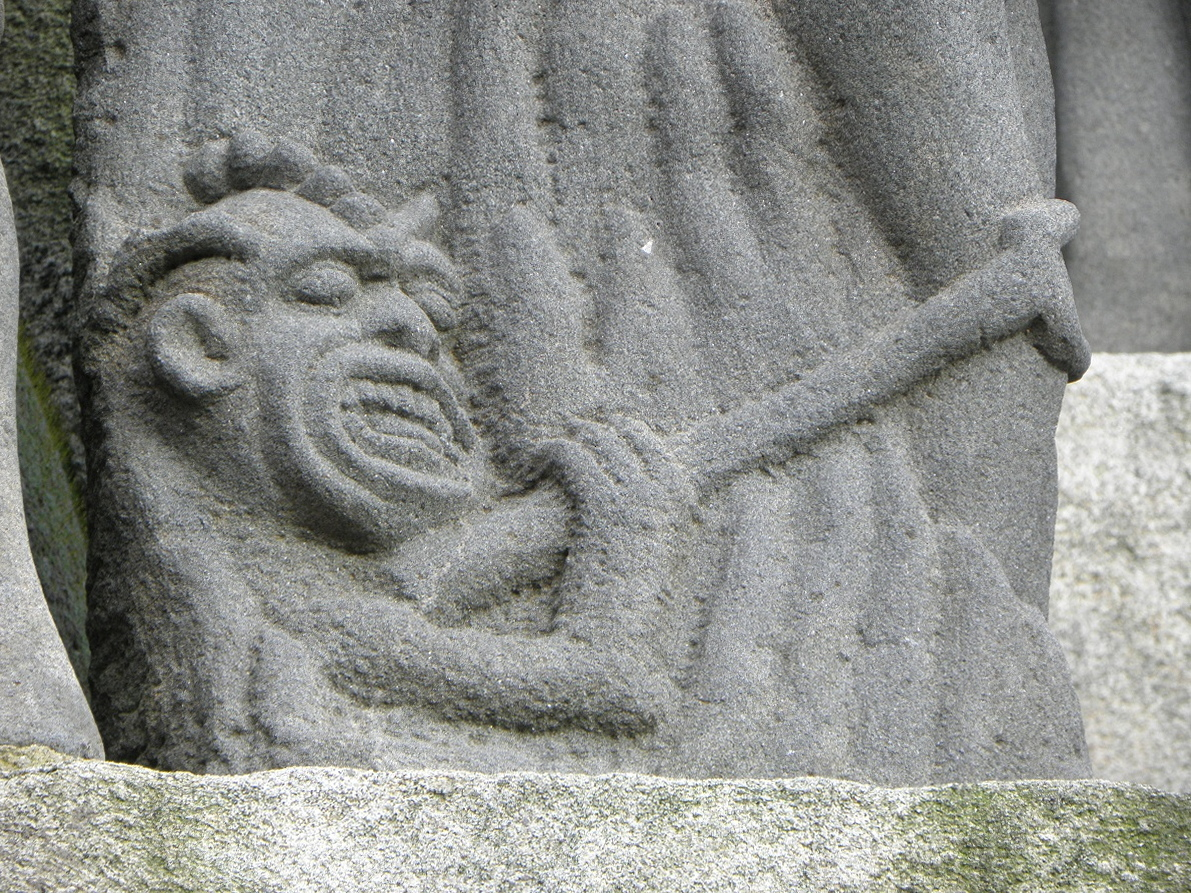
In the Harrowing of Hell scene, a demon hooks Eve's leg with his fork to stop her escaping

== See also ==
- List of the works of Bastien and Henry Prigent
- Plougonven Parish close

== Additional notes on the Calvary ==
In the folds of some of the clothes worn by the characters depicted in the calvary, traces of paint and gold gilding have been found suggesting that at one time the figures had been painted.

== Yann Larhantec's restoration ==
Larhantec was commissioned to carry out a restoration in July 1897. He created three new crosses. He repaired the horses and their riders, restored all the statuary and, under strict instruction from the clergy, he changed the order of the statues bringing them into line with the text of the gospel.

== The costumes ==
Apart from Jesus and the Virgin Mary, the characters depicted wear the clothes worn in the 16th century by Breton peasants and the bourgeoisie. The guards wear helmets, breastplates and leggings. Pontius Pilate wears ermine and has a mortar on his head looking much like a bailiff of the time. The depiction of the devil wears the attire of a pilgrim which he raises slightly to display his forked feet. Mary Magdalene wears the dress of a châtelaine of Henry II's time, with heavily pleated robe, slashed sleeves and a lace guimpe
