= Pleyben Parish close =

Coordinates: 48.2271°N 3.9697°W

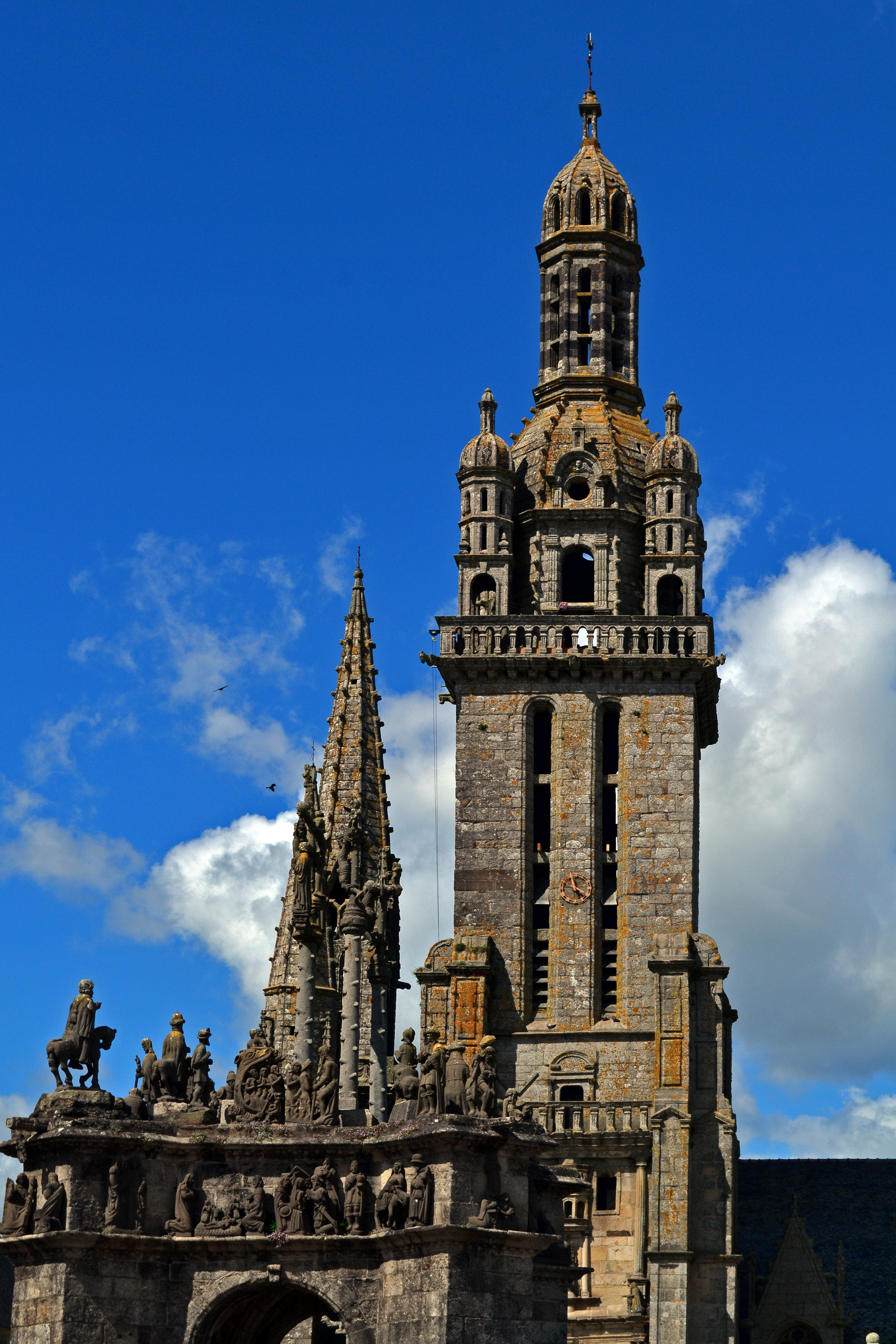
The bell-tower at Pleyben

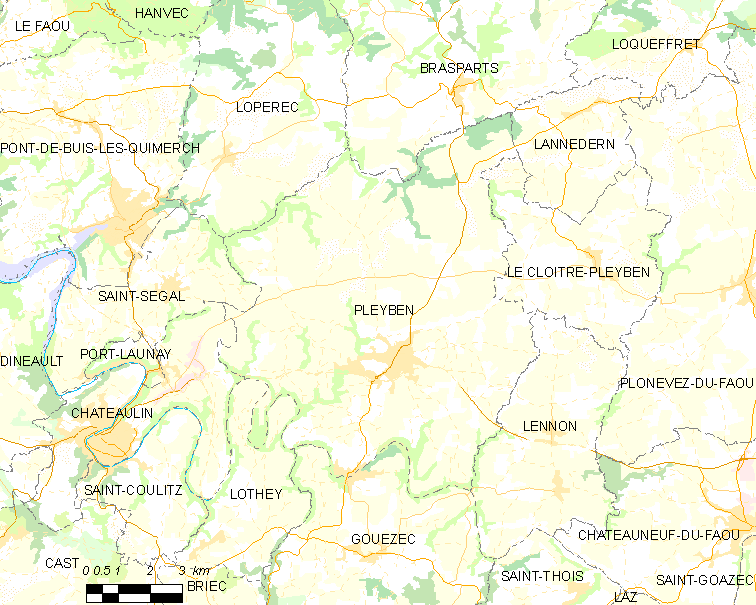
Map showing the location of Pleyben

The Pleyben Parish close (Enclos paroissial) is a historical cathedral complex at Pleyben in the Châteaulin arrondissement of Brittany in northwestern France. The enclosed paroissial comprises the parish church dedicated to Saint Germain of Auxerre, a funeral chapel/ossuary, a triumphal arch serving as the enclosed entrance, and the Calvary at Pleyben. The building is dominated by two bell towers. The rightmost, known as the Saint Germain, is in the Renaissance style and is topped by a lanterned dome; whilst the other has a Gothic style spire. Between the towers is a stair turret with pinnacles and an ornate spire. The close is a listed historical monument since 1846.

== The triumphal arch ==
This dates to 1725. Over the arch there is a statue of the Holy Father holding out his crucified son for the world to see. It would have been through this entrance that the bodies of the dead would be carried for burial in the enclos. In the Breton language these entrances are called "Porz ar maro" ("The gate of the dead").

== The ossuary ==
Whilst starting out as an ossuary in the 15th century, the building was restored in 1733 and in 1736 was named the "Chapelle des Trépassés" and dedicated to Saint Simon and Saint Jude.

== The porch ==
Above the bell-tower porch entrance there is a statue of Saint Germain which dates to 1555 and in the porch interior are statues of the apostles. Of these statues, that of John the Evangelist and James the Greater have been attributed to Roland Doré. The statue of St Germain is inscribed "EN L'HONNEUR DE DIEV ET DAE ET MONSIEVR S GERMAIN CESTE CROIX FVST COMENCE 1555". There are also two further statues on the outside of the porch, one of the "Virgin of the Annunciation" and the other the "Angel of the Annunciation". These two statues and that of Saint Germain are attributed to the Prigent atelier.

== The church interior ==
The nave is vaulted and decorated with painted and carved panels which date to the 16th century and carved horizontal beams. The church holds many fine statues. In the south transept there is a carving from wood dating to the 16th century which depicts Saint Yves standing between a rich man and a poor man. Also as one enters the choir there are niches containing statues of Saint Peter, Saint Corentin and Saint Germain, In the nave there is also a wooden carving depicting Christ on the cross with the Virgin Mary and John the Evangelist on either side. These date to the 17th century.

== The baptismal fonts ==
These date to the 17th century and are in front of an altarpiece depicting Jesus' baptism and John the Baptist's parents Zacharius and Elizabeth. There is also a statue of Saint Sernin holding Jesus' robe whilst he is baptized.

== The master altar ==
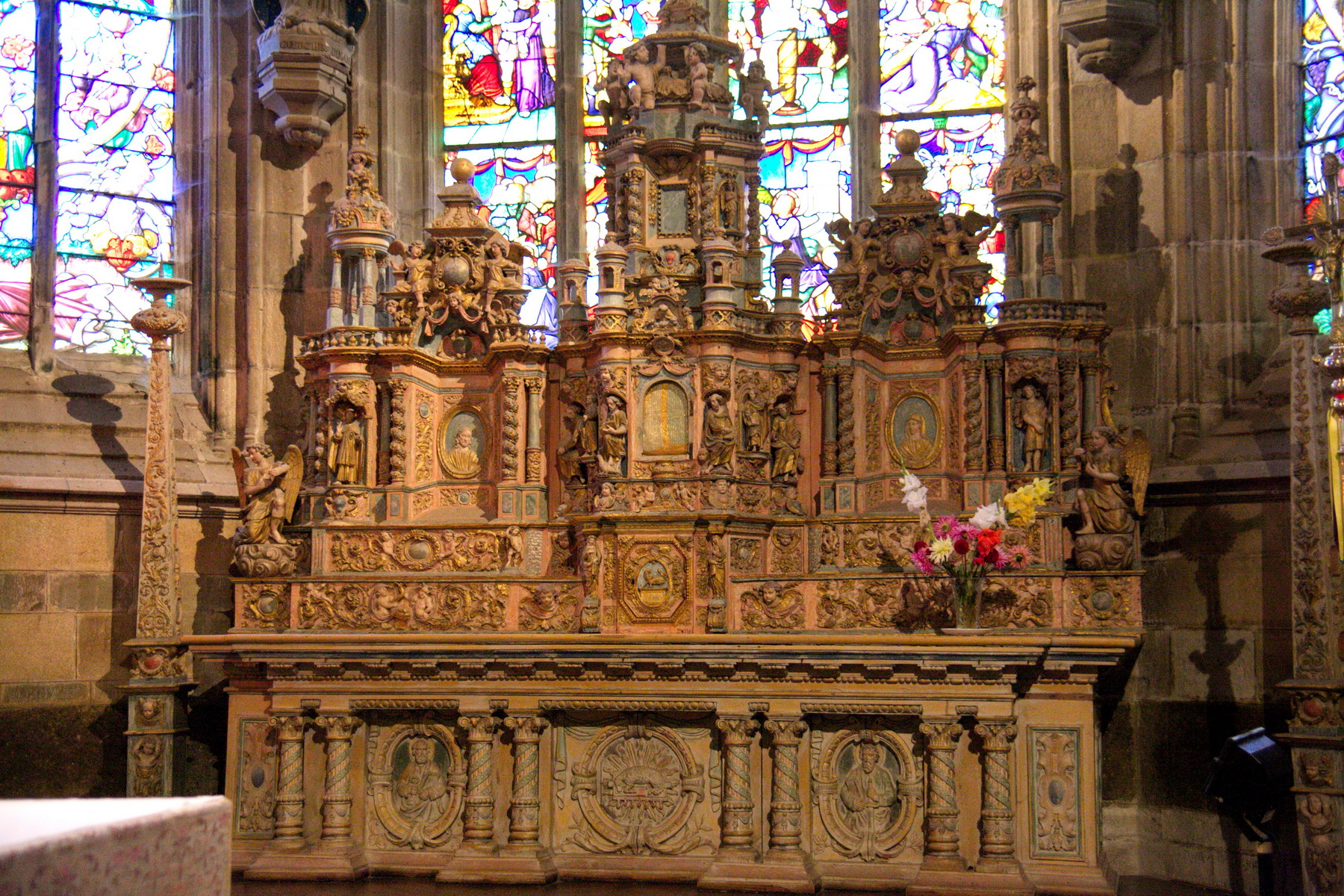
The master altar at Pleben

This has an altarpiece dating to 1667–1668 and a two-tiered tabernacle. The work is carved from oak and includes depictions of Jesus Christ, Saint Peter and Saint Paul and the four evangelists. Also depicted are Saint Germain and John the Baptist.

== The Rosary altarpiece ==
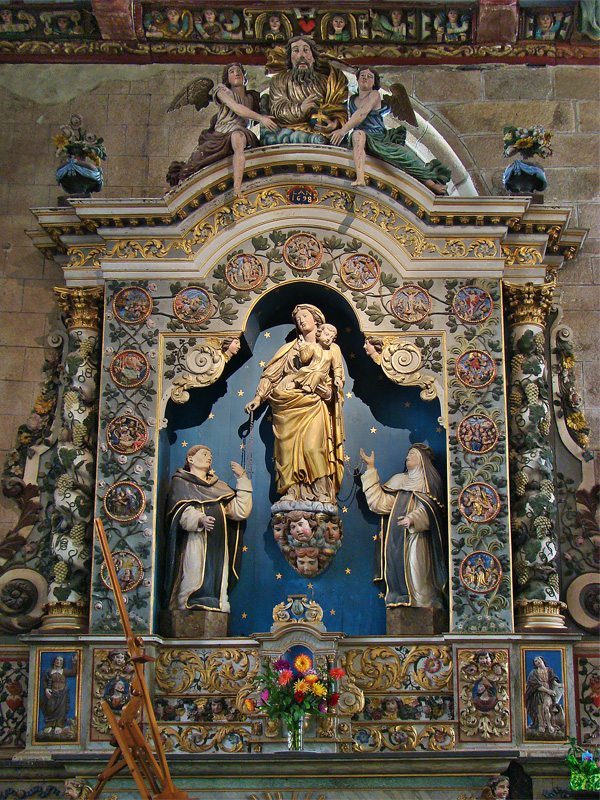
The Rosary altarpiece

The sculptor Jean Cévaer and the carpenter Jeané Le Seven combined to produce the "Rosary" altarpiece in 1696/98 and at a later stage the painter Olivier Grall added paintings. In the centre-piece the Virgin Mary is depicted handing the rosary to Saint Dominic and Saint Catherine of Sienna. Statues of Saint Luke and Saint John are positioned at the bottom of each of the side pillars and at the very top is a depiction of the Holy Father. A series of medallions spaced around the central tableau depict episodes from Jesus' life.

== The "Trépassés" altarpiece ==
At the centre of this altarpiece is a painting depicting the "Descent from the cross".

== Stained glass windows ==
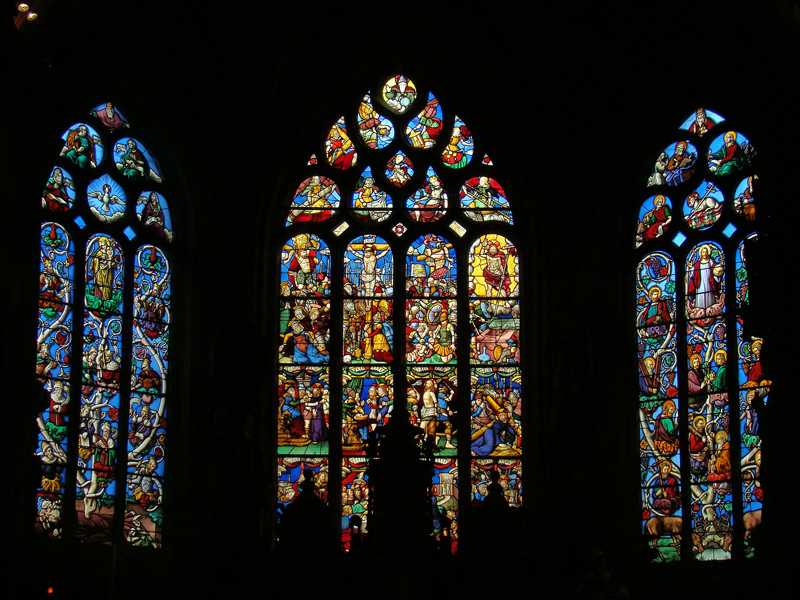
The chevet windows at Pleyben

In the centre of the church's chevet, there is a stained glass window depicting the Passion of Jesus Christ. There are further windows on each side of this central window. On the left the window depicts the Tree of Jesse and the window to the right depicts a tree representing the church featuring Jesus and his apostles. These windows date to 1879. A window in the south transept depicts scenes from the life of Saint Germain of Auxerre and a window in the north transept is dedicated to Saint Catherine of Alexandria. These two windows were executed in 1917 and are the work of an artist called Plouquet.

== The chevet ==
At the base of the exterior of the chevet is a frieze with depictions of the sun, the moon and a skull.

== The sablières ==
The church has some splendid examples of 16th century wooden sablières, the horizontal beams running along the top of the church wall where it meets the roof. At Pleyben they date to 1571, and cover five basic themes, both religious and mythological. Some 250 images are involved and the carvings also appear on the roof's cross rafters.

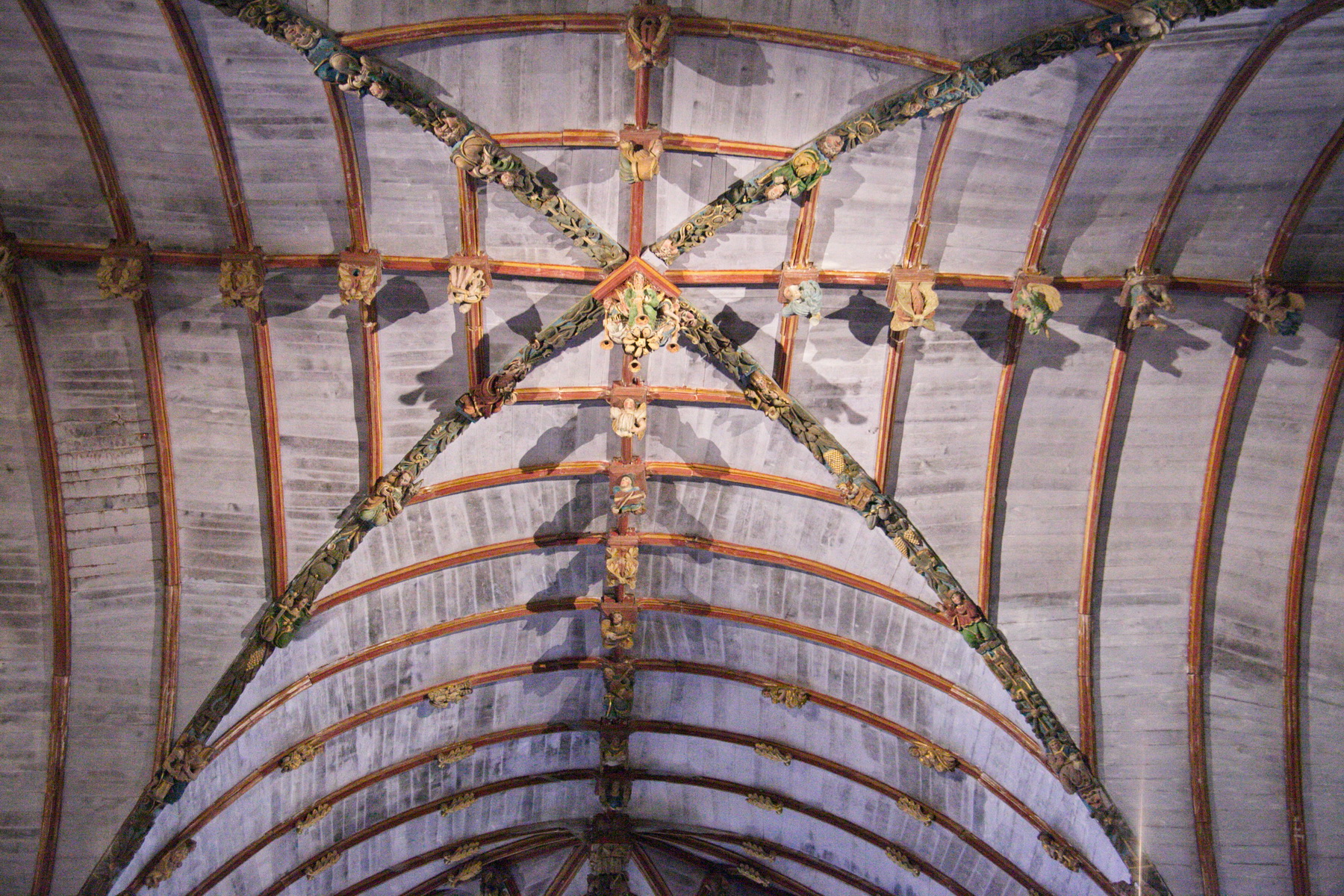
The decorated cross rafters

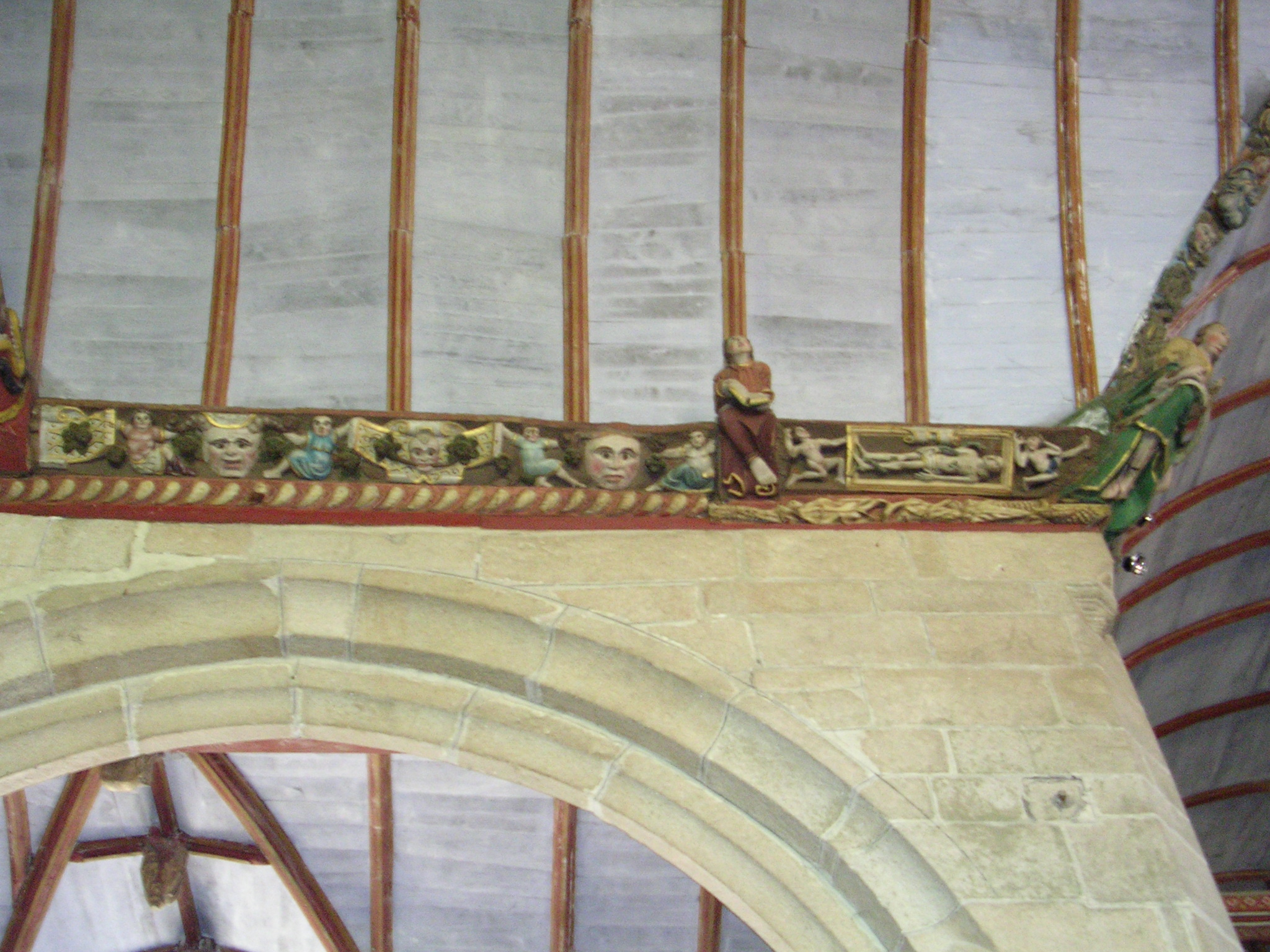
View of one of the many sablières in the church

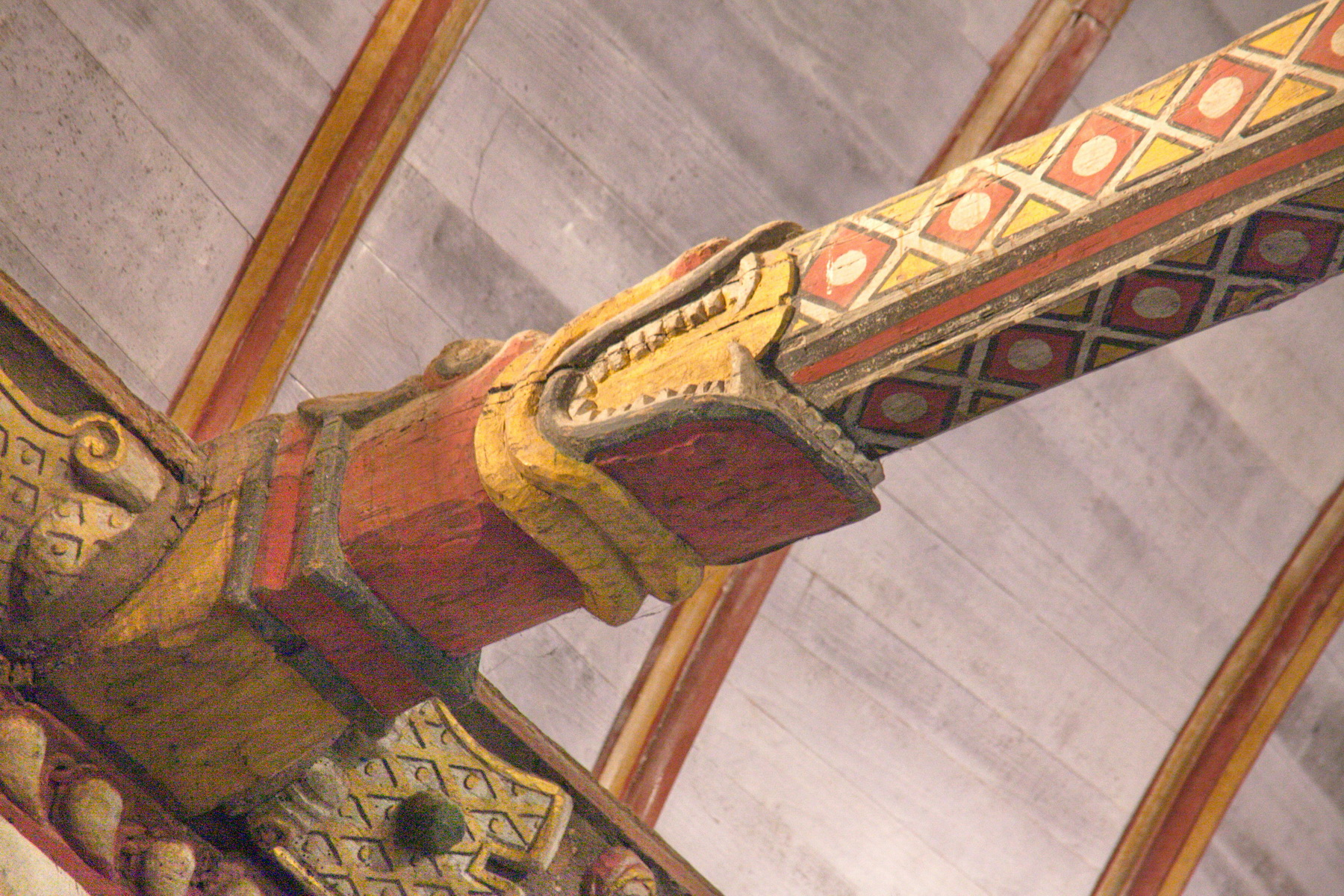
Here we see a decorated cross-beam in the church roof with a carving at the end depicting the mouth of a snake

== The sacristy ==
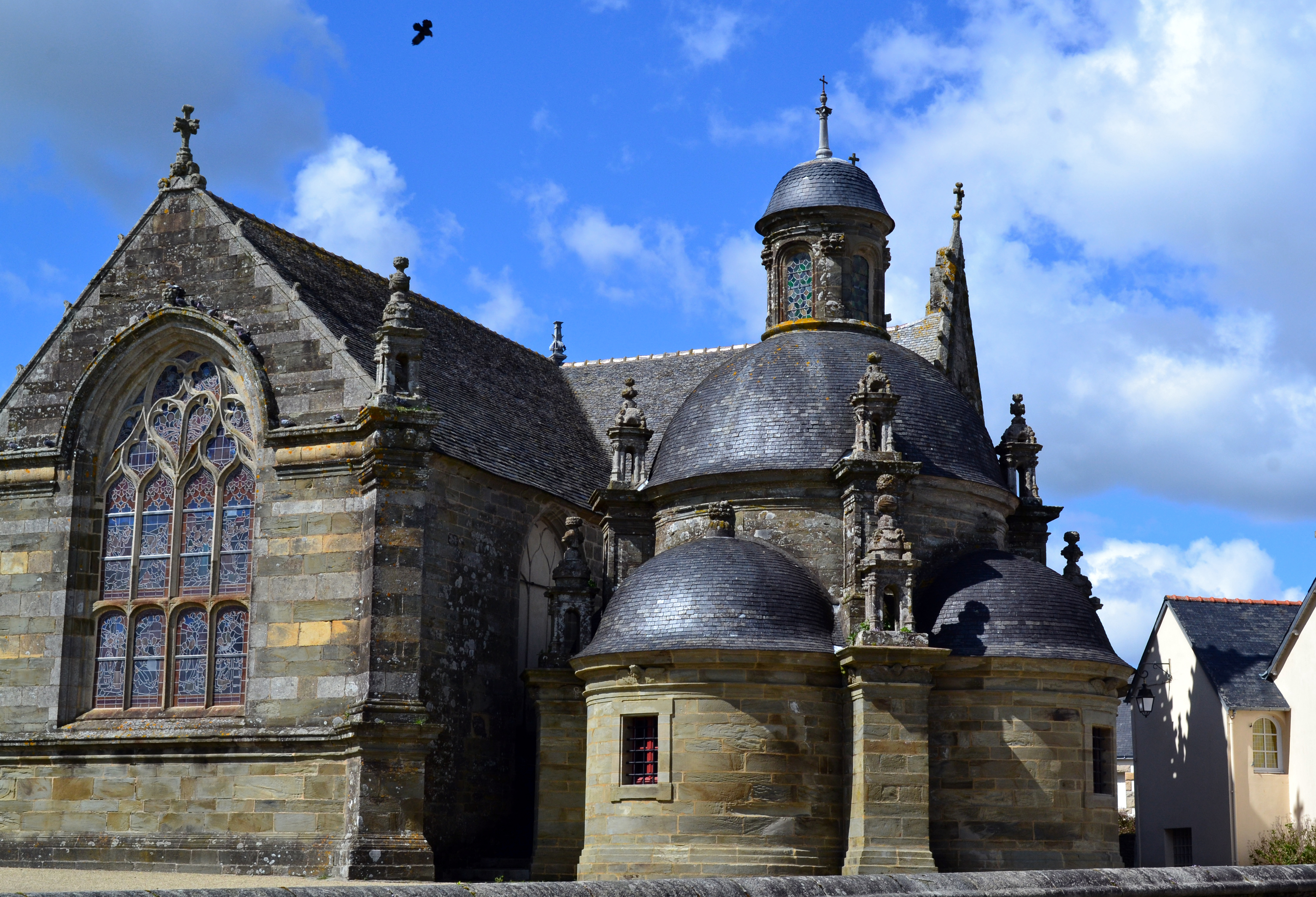
The Pleyben sacristy

== The organ ==
This was commissioned from Thomas Dallam in 1688. The organ casing was the work of Michel Madé.

== Miscellaneous images ==
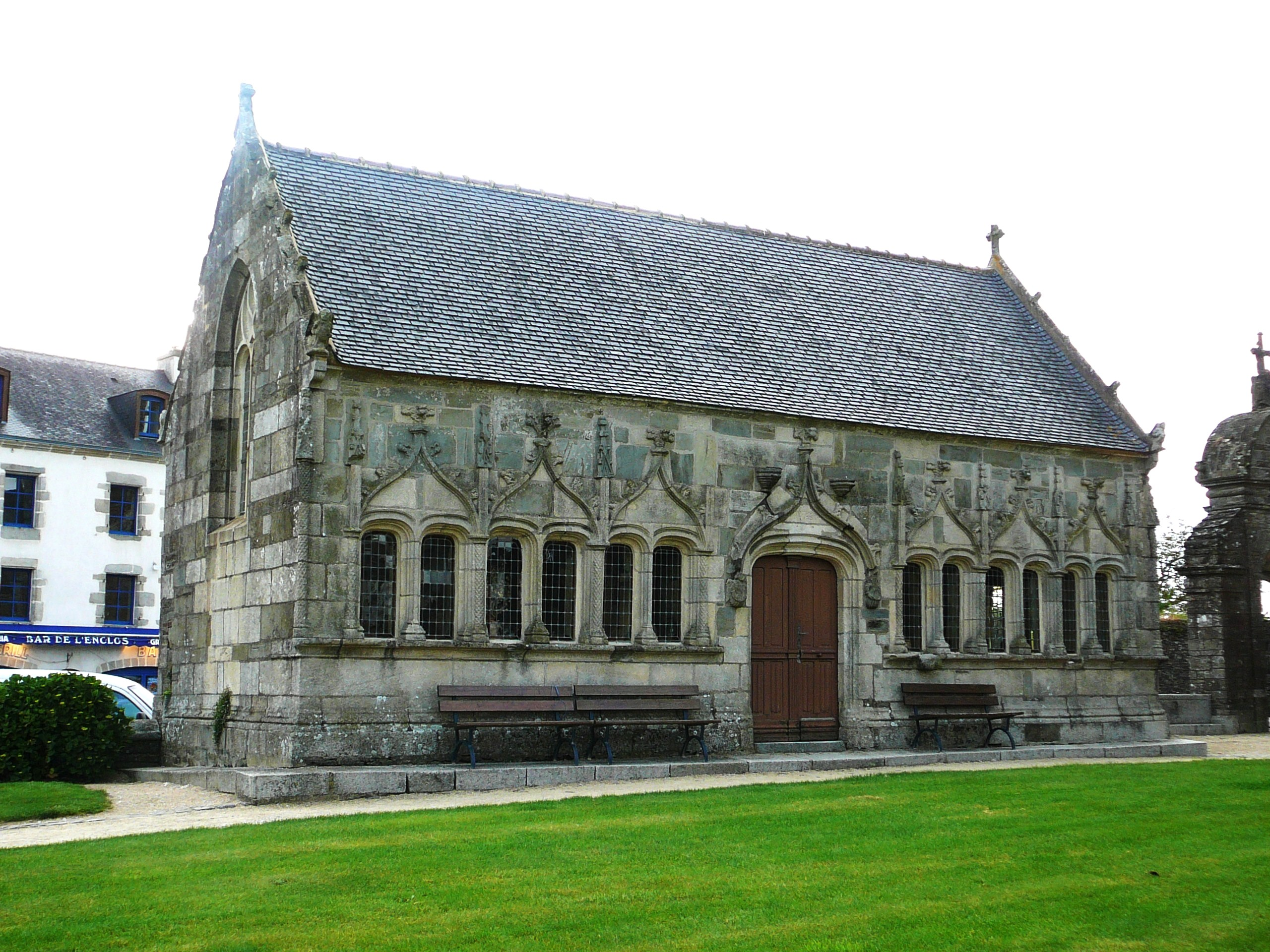
The ossuary

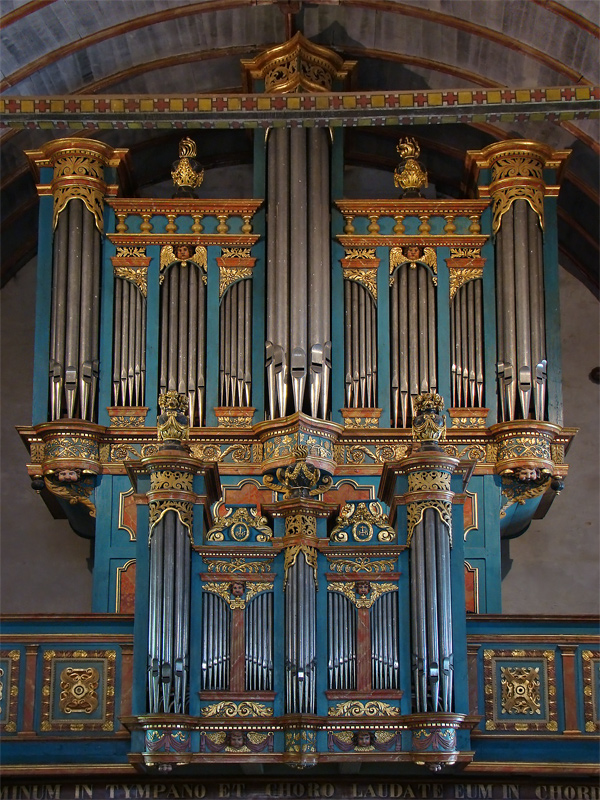
The Dallam organ with Michel Madé's casing

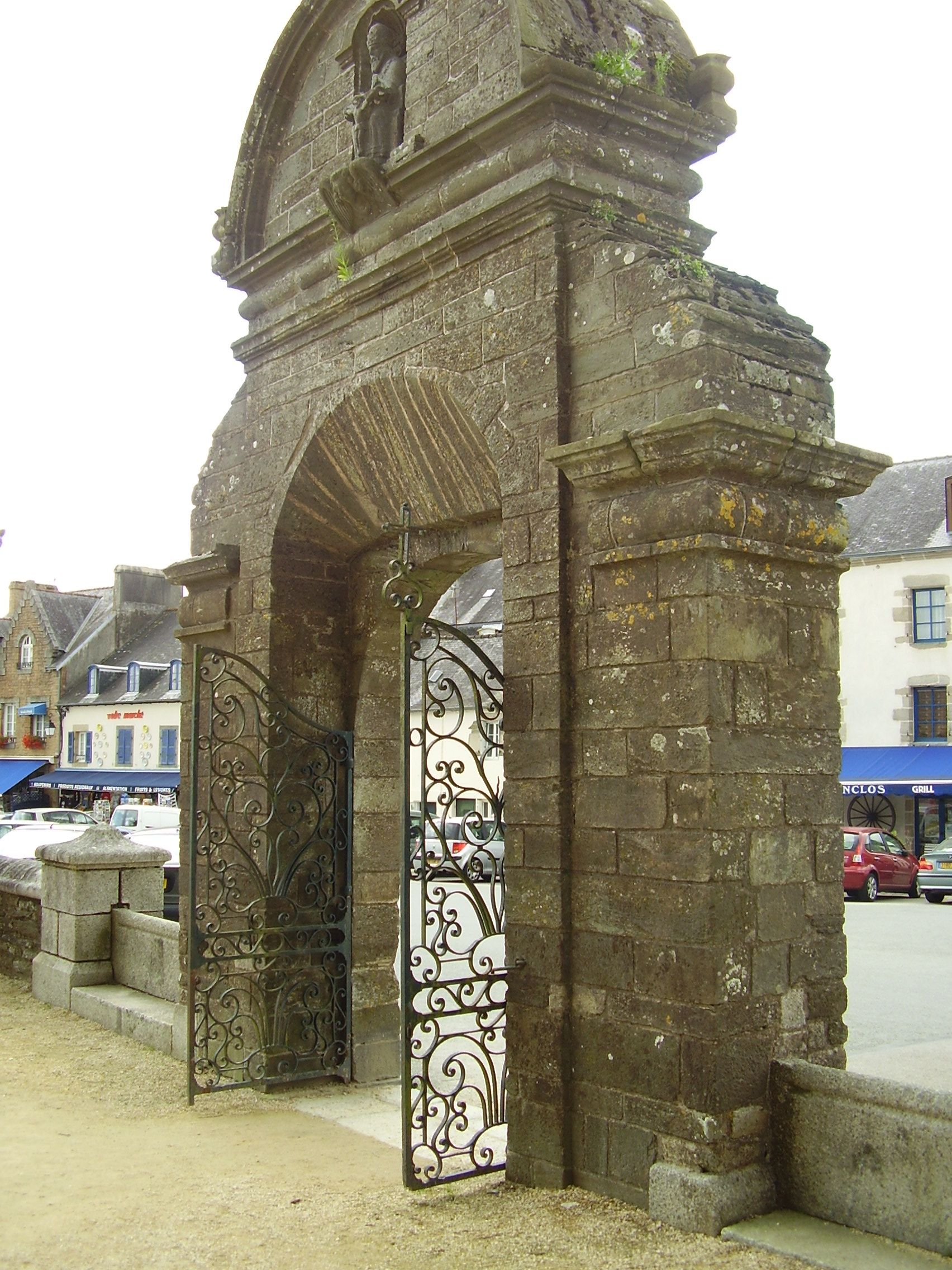
The triumphal arch at Pleyben

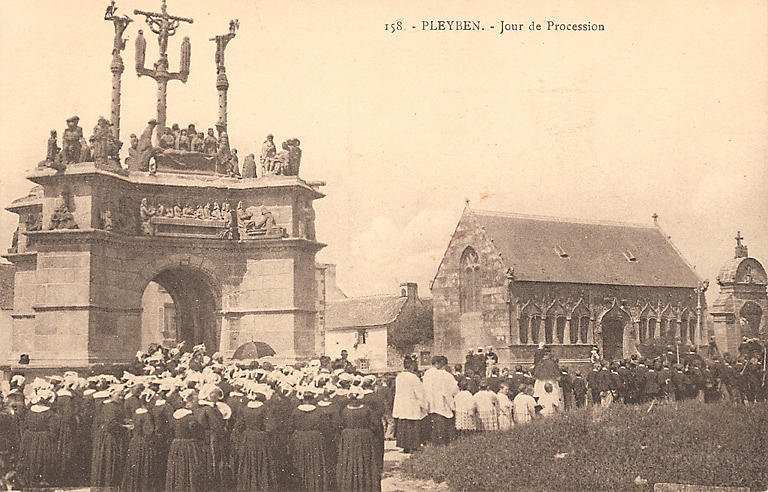
Photograph showing a procession at Pleyben. Taken between 1903 and 1920.

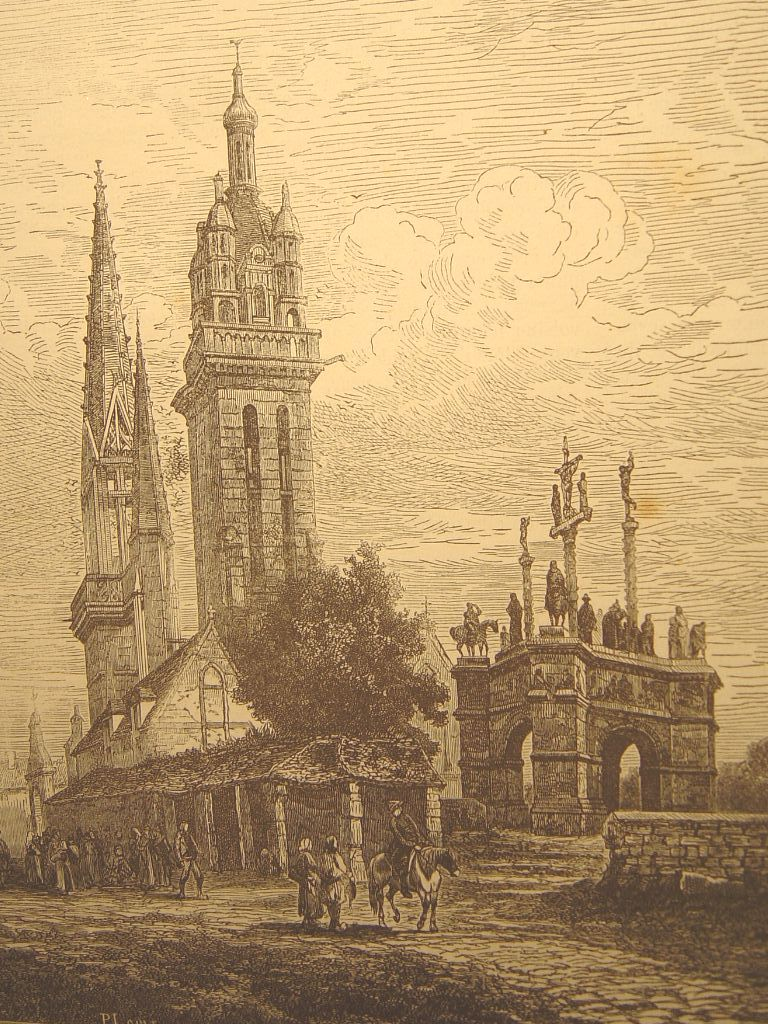
1872 lithograph of Pleyben enclos by Guiaud. From the "Européenne"

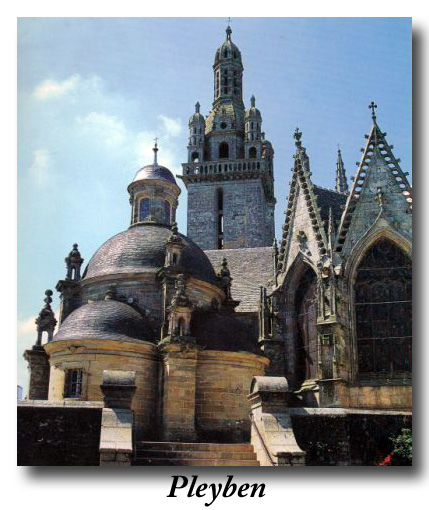
Another view of church
