= Pleyben =

Pleyben Pleiben
- Commune
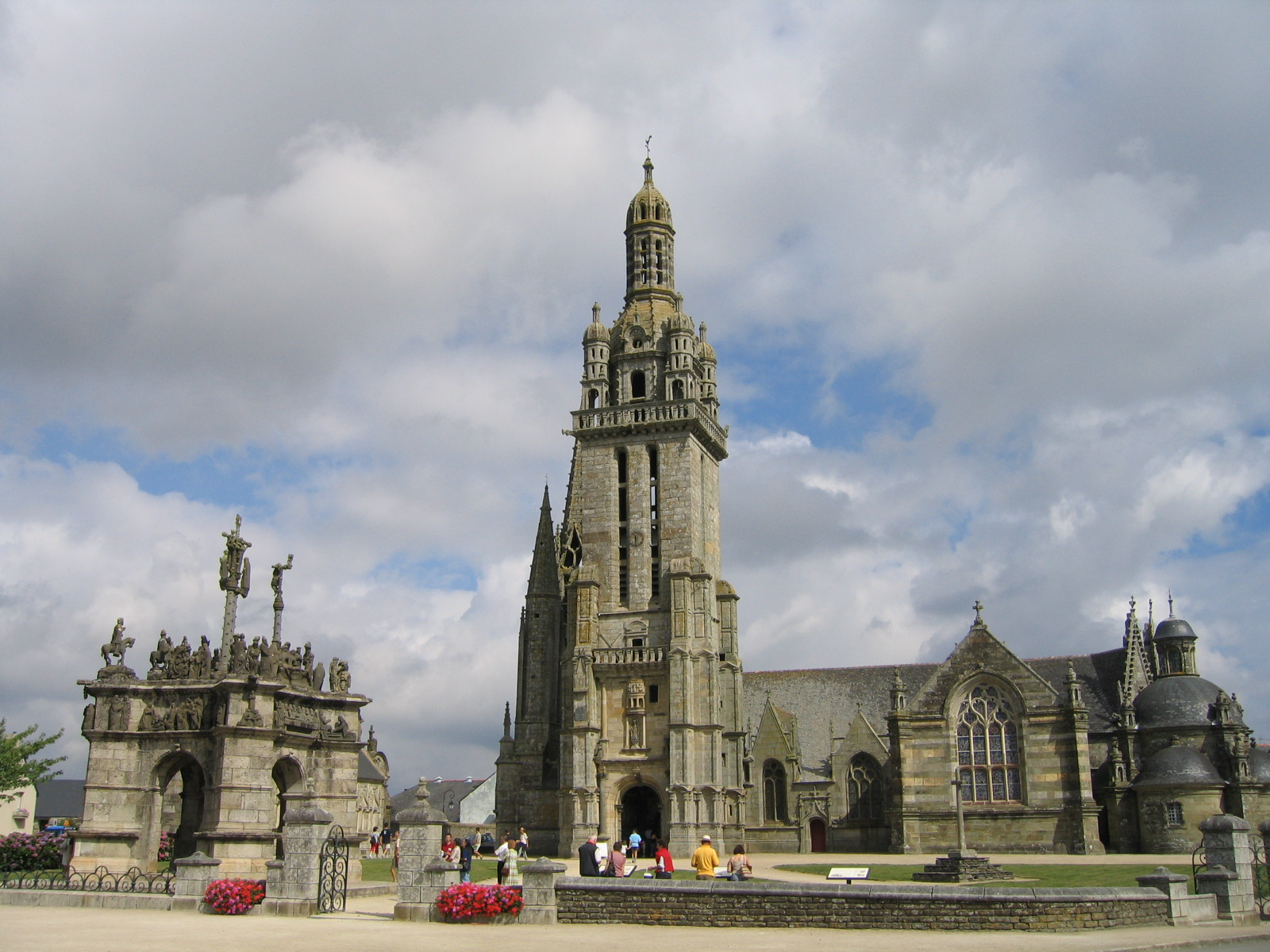
- Parish close

- Coat of arms
- Location of Pleyben
- Location within France Location within Brittany
- Coordinates: 48°13′36″N 3°58′05″W
- Country: France
- Region: Brittany
- Department: Finistère
- Arrondissement: Châteaulin
- Canton: Briec
- Intercommunality: Pleyben-Châteaulin-Porzay

Government
  - Mayor (2020–2026): Amélie Caro
- Area^{1}: 76.04 km^{2} (29.36 sq mi)
- Highest elevation: 176 m (577 ft)
- Lowest elevation: 14 m (46 ft)
- Population (2023): 3,692
  - Density: 48.55/km^{2} (125.8/sq mi)
- Time zone: UTC+01:00 (CET)
  - Summer (DST): UTC+02:00 (CEST)
- INSEE/Postal code: 29162 /29190
- ^{1} French Land Register data, which excludes lakes, ponds, glaciers > 1 km^{2} (0.386 sq mi or 247 acres) and river estuaries.

Pleyben (French pronunciation: [plɛbɛ̃]; Breton: Pleiben) is a commune in the Châteaulin arrondissement of Finistère department of Brittany in north-western France. The calvary in the churchyard dates from 1555.

== Population ==
Inhabitants of Pleyben are called in French Pleybennois.

Historical population

Year	Pop.	±% p.a.
1793	3,676	—
1800	4,014	+1.26%
1806	4,019	+0.02%
1821	4,040	+0.03%
1831	4,508	+1.10%
1836	4,635	+0.56%
1841	4,672	+0.16%
1846	5,010	+1.41%
1851	4,901	−0.44%
1856	4,897	−0.02%
1861	5,164	+1.07%
1866	5,289	+0.48%
1872	4,908	−1.24%
1876	5,227	+1.59%
1881	5,327	+0.38%
1886	5,324	−0.01%
1891	5,683	+1.31%
1896	5,617	−0.23%
1901	5,579	−0.14%

Year	Pop.	±% p.a.
1906	5,643	+0.23%
1911	5,541	−0.36%
1921	4,955	−1.11%
1926	5,012	+0.23%
1931	4,579	−1.79%
1936	4,562	−0.07%
1946	4,575	+0.03%
1954	3,998	−1.67%
1962	3,840	−0.50%
1968	3,713	−0.56%
1975	3,477	−0.93%
1982	3,491	+0.06%
1990	3,446	−0.16%
1999	3,397	−0.16%
2007	3,630	+0.83%
2012	3,684	+0.30%
2017	3,627	−0.31%
2023	3,692	+0.30%

Source: EHESS and INSEE (1968–2023)

== See also ==
- Communes of the Finistère department
- Parc naturel régional d'Armorique
- Yann Larhantec Sculptor "Croix de cimetière" in Pleyben
- Pleyben Parish close
- Roland Doré sculptor Sculptor of Pleyben calvary
- Calvary at Plougonven
- List of the works of the Maître de Thégonnec
