= Marie Jacq =

Member of the National Assembly for Finistère's 4th constituency
- In office 3 April 1978 – 1 April 1993
- Preceded by: Pierre Lelong
- Succeeded by: Arnaud Cazin d'Honincthun

Personal details
- Born: Marie Kerrien; 28 July 1919 Henvic, Finistère, France
- Died: 23 June 2014 (aged 94) Morlaix, Finistère, France
- Party: Socialist Party
- Spouse: Marcel Jacq (m. 1938; died 1976)
- Children: 2
- Awards: Knight of the Ordre des Palmes académiques; Knight's Cross of the Legion of Honour

Marie Jacq (née Kerrien; 28 July 1919 – 23 June 2014) was a French politician of the Socialist Party (PS). She was mayor of the rural town of Henvic in Northern Finistère from 1965 to 1989, Jacq represented Finistère's 4th constituency in the National Assembly from 1978 to 1993 and was the first female vice-president of the National Assembly between 1981 and 1982. In the assembly, she focused on such issues as the rural exodus, the status of spouses who were artisans or shopkeepers, farmer's wives, abortion and the Amoco Cadiz oil spill. Jacq served on the Regional Council of Brittany from 1978 to 1986. She was appointed Knight of the Ordre des Palmes académiques and the Knight's Cross of the Legion of Honour.

== Early life ==
Jacq was born in Henvic, Finistère, France on 28 July 1919. Her father, Adrien Kerrien, was in the Merchant Navy and a socialist activist. Jacq's mother, Jeanne Marie, was a dairy manager and was active in Le Havre with the French Section of the Workers' International (SFIO). She was educated at the Faure Higher Primary School in Le Havre and then at Gobelins, l'école de l'image, obtaining her advanced studies diploma.

== Career ==
When Jacq was 16 years old, she embraced socialist ideals and became a member of the Socialist Party (PS). She was active in the Socialist Youth of the Popular Front with her friend Simone Vigne. After the Second World War, Jacq was active in the SFIO in Finistère. She was on the executive committee at the federal congress in Quimper in March 1946 and was elected to the federal committee on women's issues at the congress in Landerneau in August 1946. Jacq was a member of the SFIO's national women's commission on three occasions during the 1950s. She stood for election to the National Assembly at the 1951 legislative election and the 1956 legislative election on the lists led by François Tanguy-Prigent but was unsuccessful on each occasion.

In October 1961, Jacq joined the Unified Socialist Party (PSU) and was secretary of the Henvic PSU section as well as a militant member of the Human Rights League in its secular networks, and was treasurer of the Amicale Laïque 45–65 (Secular Association 1945–1965). She was elected mayor of the rural town of Henvic in Northern Finistère in March 1965 and remained in the role until 1989. As mayor, Jacq began numerous projects such as retirement clubs, housing developments and residences, improvements and modernising the town and planting trees. She was president of the syndicat intercommunal à vocations multiples (SIVOM) of the municipalities of Carantec, Henvic, Locquénolé and Taulé from 1969 to 1983. Jacq left the PSU to join the PS in 1971 or 1972. She stood for election to Finistère's 4th constituency at the 1973 legislative election but was unsuccessful.

At the 1978 legislative election, she faced Union for French Democracy's Jean-Claude Rohel for election to Finistère's 4th constituency and was successful. Jacq was the first Breton woman to be elected to the National Assembly. She was re-elected in 1981, 1986 and 1988 before standing down when she retired from political life in 1993, having served for successive terms. Jacq was the first woman to serve as vice-president of the National Assembly from 1981 to 1982. She was a member of the Commission for Cultural, Family and Social Affairs, the Parliamentary Delegation for Demographic Issues, and the Economic Affairs Committee. Jacq was focused on issues such as the rural exodus, the status of spouses who were artisans or shopkeepers, farmer's wives, abortion and the Amoco Cadiz oil spill, and helped to save Brittany Ferries and Brit Air. She declined to join the government of François Mitterrand in the 1980s since her mother supported Michel Rocard. Jacq served on the Regional Council of Brittany from 1978 to 1986.

== Personal life ==
She was married to Marcel Jacq from 7 August 1938 to his death in 1976. They had two children. Jacq died in Morlaix, Finistère, France on 23 June 2014. Her funeral was held in Henvic on the afternoon of 26 June.

== Awards ==
Jacq was appointed Knight of the Ordre des Palmes académiques, and the Knight's Cross of the Legion of Honour.
