= Corbière =

Corbière may refer to:

== Places ==
- La Corbière, Jersey, Channel Islands
- La Corbière, Haute-Saône, France

== Other ==
- Corbiere (horse), a racehorse who won the Grand National in 1983
- Corbière Seaways, a ROPAX ferry

== People with the surname ==
- Édouard Corbière (1793–1875), French sailor, shipowner, journalist and writer
- Jacques-Joseph Corbière (1766–1853), French interior minister
- Jeannette Corbiere Lavell (born 1942), Canadian women's rights activist
- Louis Corbière (1850–1941), French botanist and mycologist
- Roger de la Corbière (1893–1974), French painter
- Tristan Corbière (1845–1875), French poet

== See also ==
- Corbières (disambiguation)
