= Kelsey Head =

Headland in north Cornwall, England

Kelsey Head Penn Kellji
- Site of Special Scientific Interest
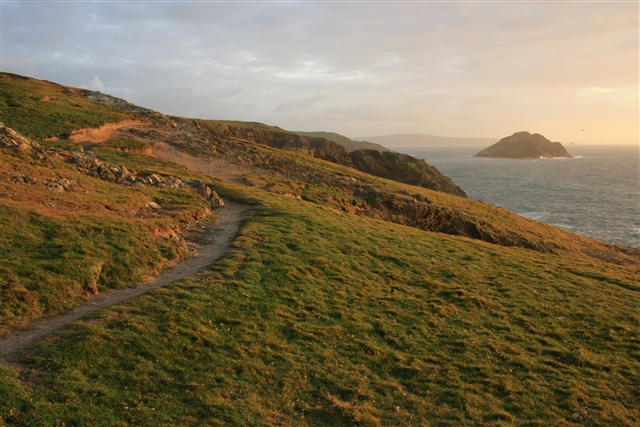
- Kelsey Head from the coastal path

- Location within Cornwall Location within England
- Location of Kelsey Head; Penn Kellji.
- Area of search: Cornwall
- Grid reference: SW775600
- Coordinates: 50.4046°N 5.1464°W
- Interest: Biological
- Area: 227 hectares (2.27 km^{2}; 0.876 sq mi)
- Notification date: 1951

Kelsey Head (Cornish: Penn Kellji, meaning cellhouse headland) is a coastal Site of Special Scientific Interest (SSSI) and headland in north Cornwall, England, noted for its biological interest. The site contains an Iron Age hill fort.

== Geography ==
The 227.6-hectare (562-acre) SSSI, notified in 1951, is located on the north Cornwall coast, within the civil parishes of Cubert and Crantock, 4 kilometres (2.5 mi) west of Newquay. It starts at Holywell Beach, near Holywell village in the west and ends at the headland of Pentire Point West, near West Pentire, in the east. The site also includes the inlet of Porth Joke as well as the inland areas of The Kelseys and Cubert Common.

The South West Coast Path runs through the SSSI and most of the coastline is owned by the National Trust.

== History ==
The headland is the site of earthwork remains of a 170-metre (560 ft) by 160-metre (520 ft) cliff castle, dated to the Iron Age. But there is evidence of earlier habitation on the site, of Mesolithic and Neolithic periods, through the discovery of flint flakes not related to the cliff castle. The cliff castle features evidence of earth and stone ramparts, a smaller annexe and an earthwork and external ditch protecting the south-eastern, inland, side.

== Wildlife and ecology ==
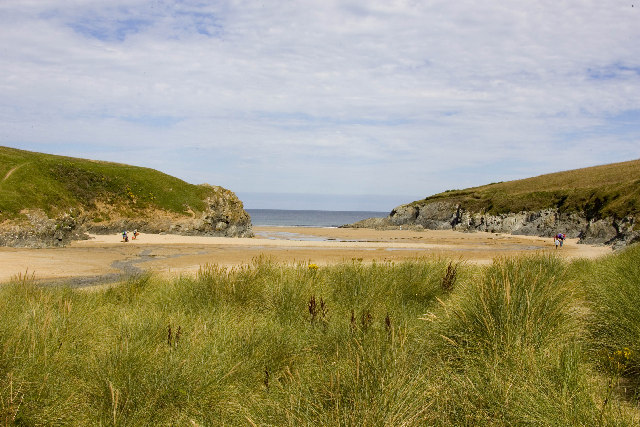
Porth Joke intertidal habitat

The two main habitats of the SSSI are the sand dunes of Holywell Bay and the calcareous grassland of Cubert Common. Other smaller habitats include meadows, scrubland, wet flushes, woodland, offshore islands and intertidal habitats.

These habitats support several invertebrate species and colonies of seabirds.
