= Philip Ensor =

British flying ace of WWII

- Born: 1920; Beckenham, Kent, England
- Died: 8 September 1941 (aged 20–21); Sainte-Sève, Morlaix, France
- Burial place: Kerfautras Cemetery, Brest, France
- Military career
- Allegiance: United Kingdom
- Branch: Royal Air Force
- Service years: 1938–1941 †
- Rank: Flight Lieutenant
- Unit: No. 23 Squadron
- Conflicts: Second World War: Battle of Britain
- Awards: Distinguished Flying Cross

Philip Stephen Baddesley Ensor, DFC (1920 – 8 September 1941) was a British flying ace who served with the Royal Air Force (RAF) during the Second World War. He was credited with having shot down at least five aircraft.

From Beckenham, Ensor joined the RAF in June 1938 and after his training was completed was posted to No. 23 Squadron. He flew Bristol Blenheim heavy fighters during the early weeks of the Second World War. He briefly served with two other squadrons from December 1939 to May 1940 before returning to his original unit. Flying the Blenheim as a night fighter in defensive operations, he claimed his first aerial victories in October. The squadron switched to offensive intruder missions to France in early 1941 and Ensor achieved further successes. Awarded the Distinguished Flying Cross in February and now flying the Douglas A-20 Havoc heavy fighter, he and his crew was killed in action during a sortie to an airfield at Morlaix on 8 September 1941.

== Early life ==
Philip Stephen Baddesley Ensor was born in 1920 at Beckenham in Kent, England, to a British Army artilleryman and his wife. After completing his schooling at Bradfield College, he joined the RAF on a short service commission in June 1938. Initially granted his commission as an acting pilot officer, he was confirmed in his rank the following June. At this time, he was posted to No. 23 Squadron, which operated Bristol Blenheim heavy fighters from Wittering.

== Second World War ==
On the outbreak of the Second World War, No. 23 Squadron was tasked with convoy patrols but was soon also engaged in night fighting duties. In December 1939 Ensor was posted to the newly formed No. 229 Squadron, which also operated Blenheims but from Digby. He was here for only a few weeks before proceeding to No. 610 Squadron, which was back at Wittering. Unlike his previous units, this was equipped with single-engined fighters, Supermarine Spitfires.

=== Night fighting operations ===
By May 1940 Ensor had resumed service with his original unit, No. 23 Squadron. This now fully engaged in night fighting duties, and during the Battle of Britain sought out Luftwaffe aircraft over the United Kingdom with the assistance of radar. Now in the rank of flying officer, on the night of 15 October, Ensor destroyed a Heinkel He 111 medium bomber over Redhill. Four nights later, he damaged a He 111 near Alfreston.

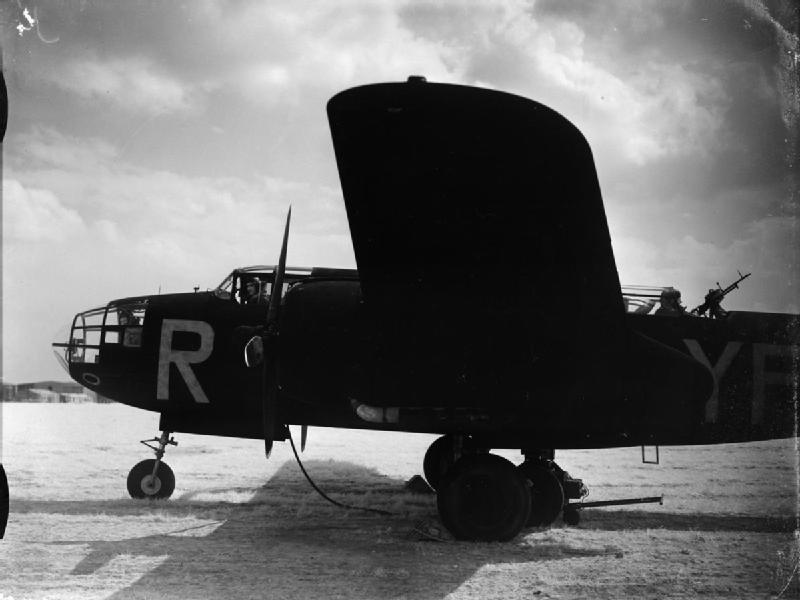
A Douglas A-20 Havoc night fighter of No. 23 Squadron at the RAF station at Ford

By the end of the year, No. 23 Squadron had switched to an intruder role with its Blenheims, flying from the RAF station at Ford to German-occupied France seeking out Luftwaffe bombers over their own airfields. On a sortie carried out on 2 January 1941, Ensor was credited with the probable destruction of a He 111 of Kampfgeschwader 55 (Bomber Wing 55) over Dreux on the night of 2 January. The attacked aircraft was later determined to have crash landed at Villacoublay. In recognition of his successes, Ensor was awarded the Distinguished Flying Cross (DFC); the citation, published in The London Gazette, read:

This officer has participated in numerous engagements against the enemy, including three at night. He has at all times displayed great skill and keenness over a long period of operations and has contributed largely to the high standard of morale in his squadron.

— London Gazette, No. 35079, 18 February 1941

Ensor shot down a He 111 over Merville on the night of 3 March and on a sortie to Beauvais airfield on the night of 11 March, caught and destroyed another He 111 on the ground. On the night of 3 May Ensor, flying a Douglas A-20 Havoc heavy fighter which now equipped the squadron, shot down a Junkers Ju 88 medium bomber and probably destroyed a He 111 at Le Bourget airfield. The next night, at an airfield at Caen, he attacked several aircraft; he probably destroyed one He 111 and damaged a second, as well as damaging another aircraft of a type that was unable to be identified. He destroyed a He 111 at Vitry-Le Culot, near Arras, on the night of 7 May. Three nights later, on a return trip to Beauvais airfield, he shot down a Ju 88.

In the early morning of 8 September, Ensor, now a flight lieutenant, and his crew, Flight Sergeants Peter Roberts and George Oliver, were killed on a sortie targeting airfields on Brittany's north coast. After attacking the airfield at Morlaix, Ensor's aircraft was damaged by either anti-aircraft fire or by a Luftwaffe night fighter. The Havoc crashed at nearby Sainte-Sève, resulting in the deaths of all three RAF personnel. Their bodies were recovered by nearby residents but the German occupiers were soon on site and took the remains of the crew.

Survived by his wife Joan Bragg, who he had married earlier in the year at Chichester, Ensor is buried at Kerfautras Cemetery in Brest. On 30 August 2024, a memorial to Ensor and his crew was unveiled at Sainte Séve and local streets named in their honour.

Ensor is credited with the destruction of five aircraft, plus one on the ground, with three more probably destroyed. He also damaged three aircraft.
