= Carantec =

Carantec Karanteg
- Commune
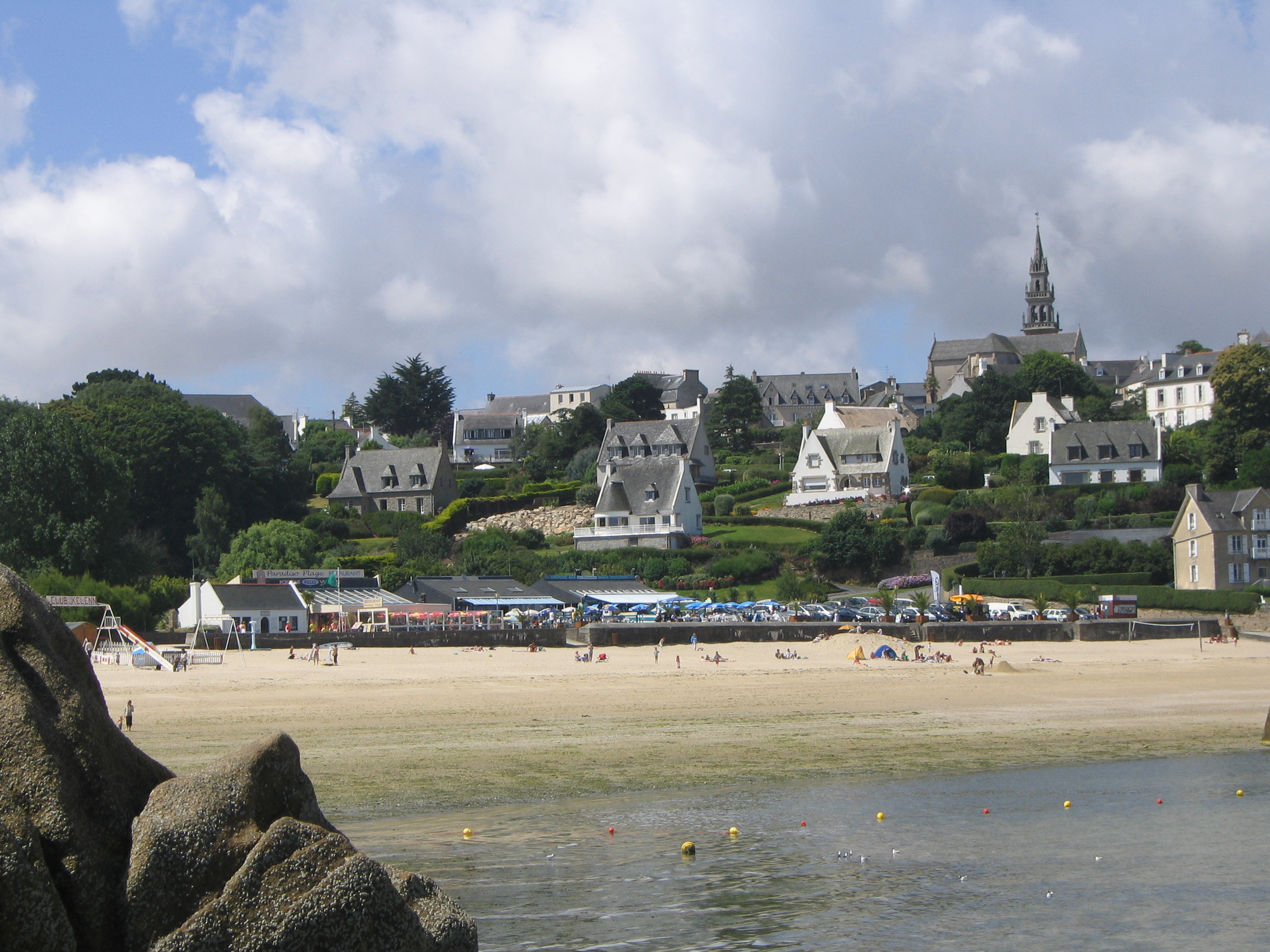
- Kélenn Beach, at Carantec

- Coat of arms
- Location of Carantec
- Location within France Location within Brittany
- Coordinates: 48°40′07″N 3°54′45″W
- Country: France
- Region: Brittany
- Department: Finistère
- Arrondissement: Morlaix
- Canton: Morlaix
- Intercommunality: Morlaix Communauté

Government
  - Mayor (2020–2026): Nicole Segalen-Hamon
- Area^{1}: 9.02 km^{2} (3.48 sq mi)
- Highest elevation: 74 m (243 ft)
- Lowest elevation: 0 m (0 ft)
- Population (2023): 3,272
  - Density: 363/km^{2} (940/sq mi)
- Time zone: UTC+01:00 (CET)
  - Summer (DST): UTC+02:00 (CEST)
- INSEE/Postal code: 29023 /29660
- ^{1} French Land Register data, which excludes lakes, ponds, glaciers > 1 km^{2} (0.386 sq mi or 247 acres) and river estuaries.

Carantec (French pronunciation: [kaʁɑ̃tɛk]; Breton: Karanteg) is a commune in the Finistère department of Brittany in north-western France.

Carantec is located on the coast of the English Channel. It contains a small island within its boundaries, Île Callot, which can be reached by a causeway during most low tides (except at neap tide). Carantec is bordered by the communes of Henvic and Taulé to the south, and is near the town of Morlaix.

== International relations ==
Carantec is twinned with

Le Grand-Saconnex, Canton of Geneva Switzerland	Crantock, Cornwall, United Kingdom

== Local industries ==
Carantec's two primary industries are oyster farming and tourism.

=== Tourism ===
Since 1926, Carantec has been classified as a "station balnéaire".

=== Oyster farming ===
Carantec and the Bay of Morlaix have been home to oyster farming operations since 1892. Today Carantec is home to 15 oyster farms with over 700 hectares of oyster beds that produce over 6500 tonnes of oysters per year.

== Population ==
Inhabitants of Carantec are called in French Carantécois.

Historical population

Year	Pop.	±% p.a.
1793	999	—
1800	949	−0.73%
1806	1,152	+3.28%
1821	1,222	+0.39%
1831	1,231	+0.07%
1836	1,250	+0.31%
1841	1,230	−0.32%
1846	1,290	+0.96%
1851	1,305	+0.23%
1856	1,320	+0.23%
1861	1,355	+0.52%
1866	1,393	+0.55%
1872	1,387	−0.07%
1876	1,374	−0.24%
1881	1,391	+0.25%
1886	1,636	+3.30%
1891	1,756	+1.43%
1896	1,794	+0.43%
1901	1,641	−1.77%

Year	Pop.	±% p.a.
1906	1,724	+0.99%
1911	1,833	+1.23%
1921	1,925	+0.49%
1926	2,106	+1.81%
1931	2,147	+0.39%
1936	2,210	+0.58%
1946	2,548	+1.43%
1954	2,494	−0.27%
1962	2,603	+0.54%
1968	2,651	+0.31%
1975	2,527	−0.68%
1982	2,522	−0.03%
1990	2,609	+0.42%
1999	2,724	+0.48%
2007	3,232	+2.16%
2012	3,150	−0.51%
2017	3,161	+0.07%
2023	3,272	+0.58%

Source: EHESS and INSEE (1968-2023)

== Sights ==
- The Château du Taureau (17th century) is a castle built on a reef to protect the town of Morlaix from English incursions by sea. It is located on the territory of the commune of Plouezoc'h, but is closer to Carantec, a port from which it can easily be visited.
- The Rohou Mansion was built at the end of the 19th century.
- Île Louët, an islet with a lighthouse, was built in 1857 to plans by the engineer Fenoux, and its caretaker's house is now rented as a tourist lodge.
- Callot Island is accessible by a causeway that the tide covers and uncovers.
- The Saint-Carantec church, in neo-Gothic style, dates from the 19th century and was built by the architect of the time, Mr. de Kermenguy. The apse contains a beautiful processional cross (1652) in silver and another simpler one in front of the altar.
- The Lande lighthouse
- The maritime museum of Carantec began with the exhibition of objects recovered from the wrecked boat L'Alcide, a privateer from Saint-Malo which sank in 1747 in the bay of Morlaix. The museum deals with various themes of the region: oyster farming, privateering (the Alcide corsair, a cannon of which is in the Jacobins museum in Morlaix), the flora and fauna of Morlaix, and a collection of seaweed.
- The old slate quarry of Roc'h Glas (toponym meaning "blue rock") is open on the edge of Morlaix's harbor. Slate extraction, attested from the middle of the 19th century, took place both on the foreshore and a little further back, in the coastal cliff.

== See also ==
- Communes of the Finistère department
