= Michel Mohrt =

French editor, essayist, novelist and historian

- Born: 28 April 1914; Morlaix, France
- Died: 17 August 2011 (aged 97); Paris, France
- Education: University of Rennes
- Known for: Member of the Académie française

Michel Mohrt (28 April 1914 – 17 August 2011) was an editor, essayist, novelist and historian of French literature.

Mohrt was born in Morlaix, Finistère. He was elected to the Académie française on 18 April 1985. Mohrt died at the age of 97 on 17 August 2011.

== Biography ==
Mohrt entered the literary world at the age of 14, creating woodcuts for a book by the renowned French writer Jakez Breton-Riou. He studied law and literature at the University of Rennes. After obtaining a degree in law he applied at the barreau de Morlaix in 1937. He was a strong supporter of the "Action Française".

He fought with distinction during the 1940 Alpine Line campaign against the Italians, most notably in the Vésubie. During this campaign he fought alongside the famous Jean Bassompierre, who, after the campaign against the Italians, enlisted in the Wehrmacht to fight Bolshevism. Michel Mohrt gave him recognition in his work Tombeau de La Rouërie (English: Tomb of the Rouërie).

He was a long-time editor at Éditions Gallimard, where he was a specialist in North American literature. In 1962 he received the Grand Prize in the category of novels from the Académie française for his novel Sea Prison and was elected to the Académie on 18 April 1985.

== Bibliography ==
- 1943 Montherlant, « homme libre » (Gallimard)
- 1943 Les Intellectuels devant la défaite de 1870 (Buchet-Chastel)
- 1945 Le Répit, roman (Albin Michel)
- 1948 Le Cavalier de la nuit, R. Penn Warren (Stock)
- 1949 Mon royaume pour un cheval (Albin Michel)
- 1951 Les Nomades (Albin Michel)
- 1952 Marin-la-Meslée (Pierre Horay)
- 1953 Le Serviteur fidèle (Albin Michel)
- 1955 Le Nouveau Roman américain (Gallimard)
- 1956 La Littérature d’Amérique du Nord, dans Histoire des Littératures, tome II (Gallimard)
- 1961 La Prison maritime (Gallimard) – Grand Prix du roman de l'Académie française
- 1963 La Marche de nuit, William Styron (Gallimard)
- 1965 La Campagne d’Italie (Gallimard)
- 1969 L’Ours des Adirondacks (Gallimard)
- 1970 L’Air du large (Gallimard)
- 1970 Un jeu d’enfer, théâtre (Gallimard)
- 1974 Deux Indiennes à Paris (Gallimard)
- 1975 Les Moyens du bord (Gallimard)
- 1979 La Maison du père, récit (Gallimard)
- 1980 Paquebots, le temps des traversées (Éditions Maritimes et d’outremer)
- 1986 La Guerre civile (Gallimard)
- 1988 Vers l’Ouest (Olivier Orban)
- 1988 L’Air du large II (Gallimard)
- 1989 Le Télésiège (Gallimard)
- 1989 Benjamin ou Lettres sur l’inconstance (Gallimard)
- 1991 L’Air du temps (Le Rocher)
- 1991 Un soir, à Londres (Gallimard)
- 1992 Monsieur l’Ambassadeur, théâtre (Gallimard)
- 1992 On liquide et on s’en va, sotie (Gallimard)
- 1996 Les Dimanches de Venise (Gallimard)
- 1998 Bouvard et Pécuchet, de Gustave Flaubert (Gallimard)
- 1998 L’Ile des fous, nouvelles (Le Rocher)
- 1999 De bonne et mauvaise humeur (Le Rocher)
- 2000 Tombeau de La Rouërie (Gallimard)
- 2002 Jessica ou l'amour affranchi (Gallimard)

== See also ==
- The European (1953 magazine)
