= Crantock =

Village in Cornwall, England

Coordinates: 50.401°N 5.111°W

Crantock: Cornish: Lanngorrow
- Location within Cornwall
- Population: 925 (2021 census)
- OS grid reference: SW790603
- Civil parish: Crantock
- Unitary authority: Cornwall
- Ceremonial county: Cornwall
- Region: South West
- Country: England
- Sovereign state: United Kingdom
- Post town: Newquay
- Postcode district: TR8
- Dialling code: 01637
- Police: Devon and Cornwall
- Fire: Cornwall
- Ambulance: South Western
- UK Parliament: St Austell and Newquay

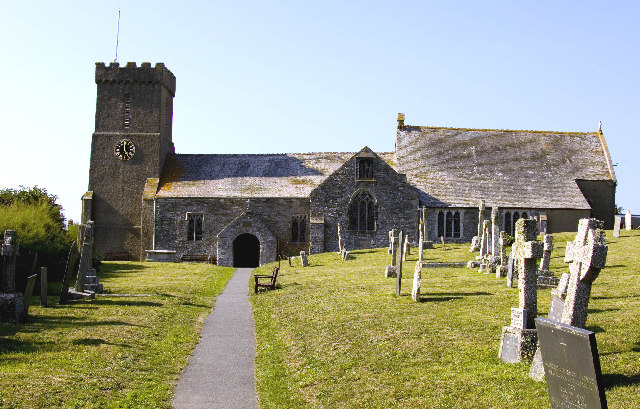
St Carantoc's Church, Crantock

Crantock (Cornish: Lanngorrow) is a coastal civil parish and village in Cornwall, England, two miles (3 km) southwest of Newquay.

In 460, a group of Celtic missionaries founded an oratory there. The village lies to the south of the River Gannel, which forms the boundary between the parishes of Newquay and Crantock. The River Gannel is tidal and ferries operate on a seasonal basis from Fern Pit to Crantock Beach. The River Gannel runs along Crantock Beach and joins the Celtic Sea. The village can be reached from the A3075 road via the junction at Trevemper. The hamlets of Treninnick and West Pentire are in the parish.

Large parts of the parish are now in the ownership of the National Trust, including West Pentire headland which is a Site of Special Scientific Interest noted for its wild flowers and rare plants.

== History and antiquities ==
The Gannel Estuary, Cornwall: Archaeological and Historical Assessment, published by the Cornwall Archaeological Unit concluded that human activity around the Gannel could be dated to the Mesolithic period. The earliest development in the area is Treringey Round, a roughly-rectangular area enclosed by bank 1 metre high and an outer ditch 1.3 metres deep. It is of unknown pre-historic date. Treringey Round is located at the end of an ancient route at the head of the (then) navigable Gannel estuary.

The existence of a collegiate church at Crantock is recorded in the Domesday Book. It was refounded in 1236 and dissolved in 1549 during the Reformation.

The older part of Crantock village is situated around its parish church which is dedicated to St Carantoc, founder of the village. At one time the parish was known as Langurroc which translates as 'the dwelling of monks'. There is a Langurroc Road in the village. Langurroc was infamously (among locals) covered up in a sandstorm and may well lie beneath the sand dunes which back Crantock Beach.

St Carantoc's Church was founded in Norman times and was originally cruciform but it was reconstructed in the 14th and 15th centuries. Restoration was carried out during the period 1899–1902 by E. H. Sedding, who died in 1921 and is buried in the churchyard. The font is Norman and the rood screen is much restored.

== Geography ==
=== Beaches ===
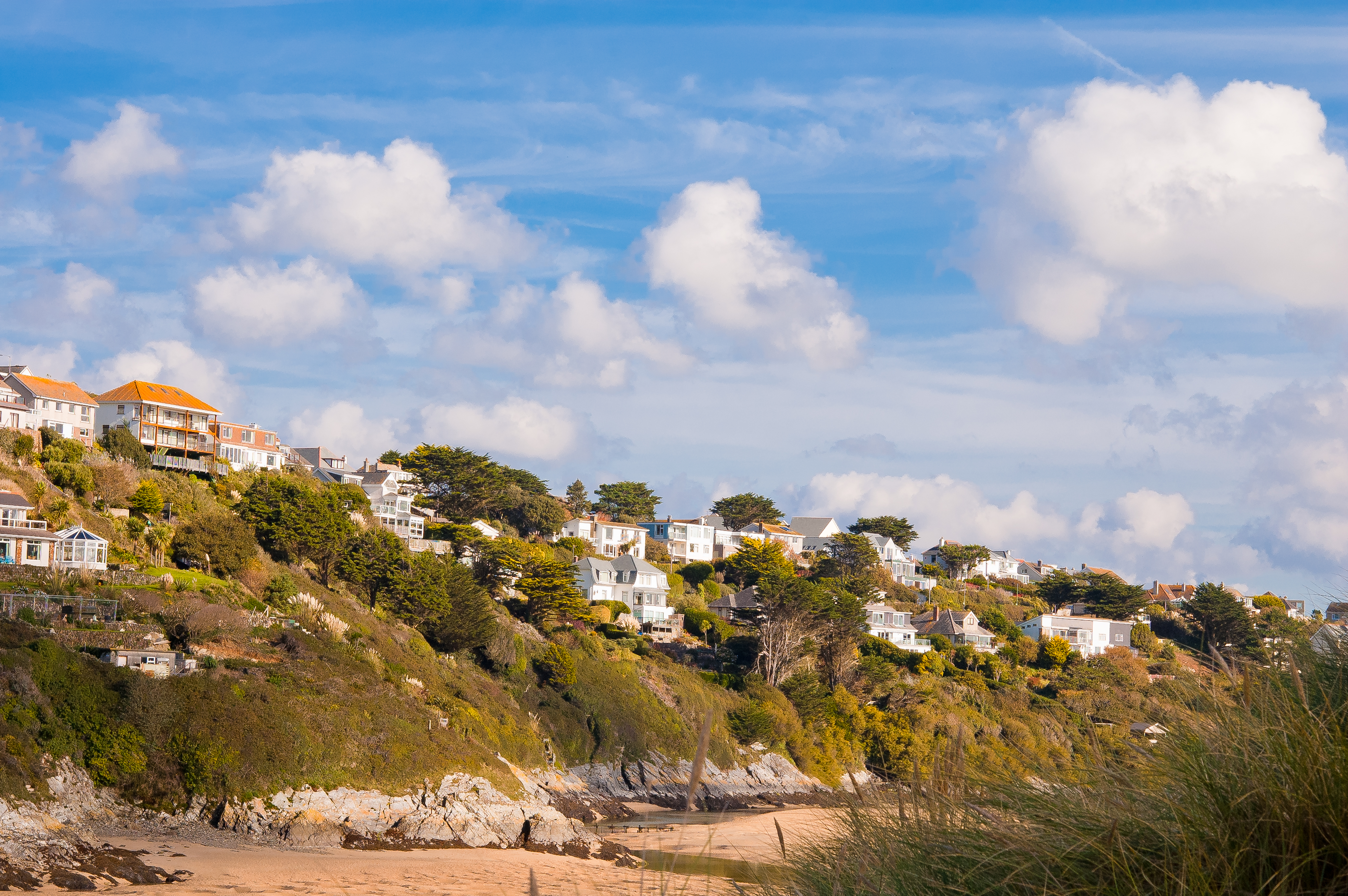
Crantock Beach

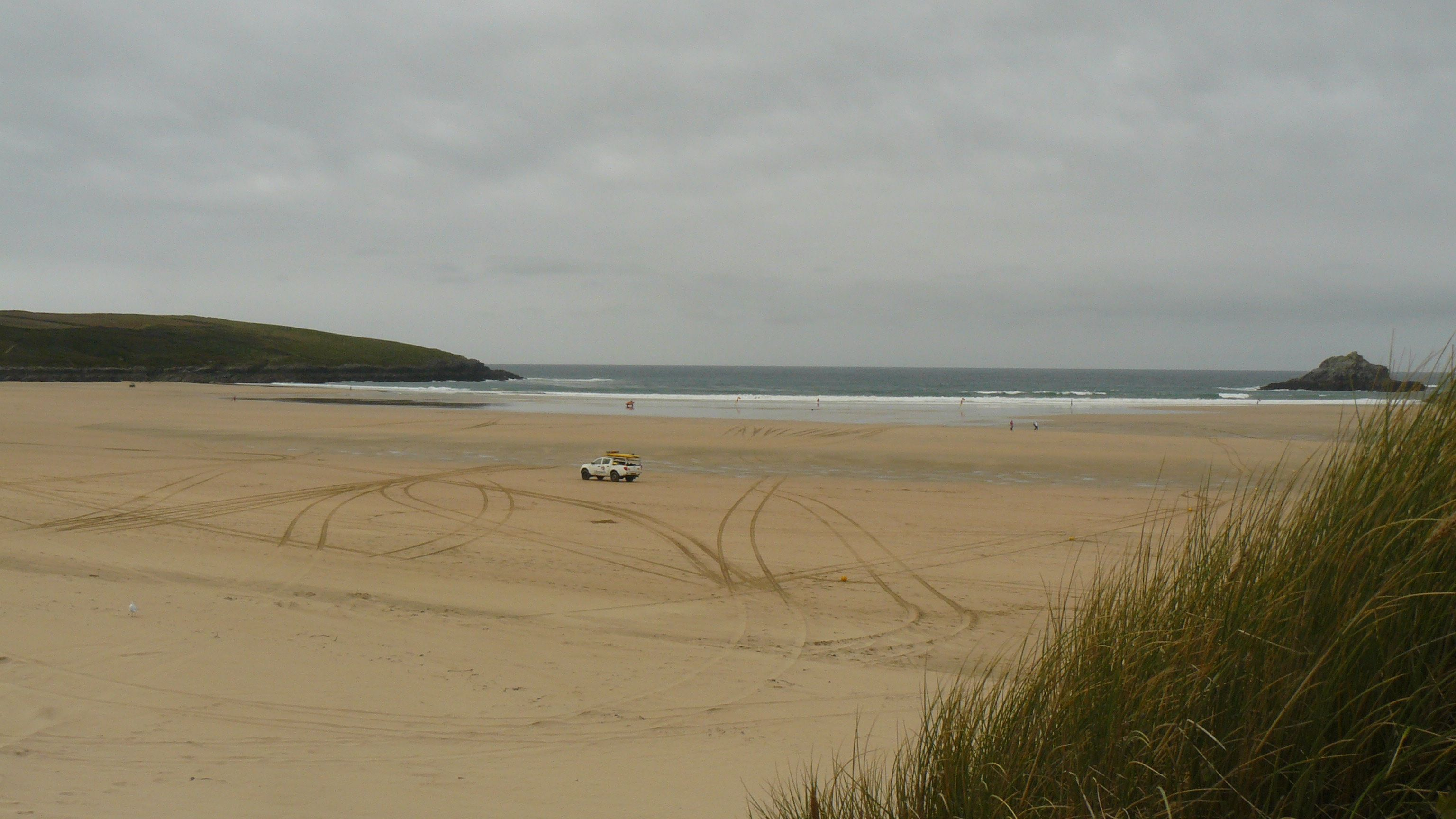
Crantock Beach

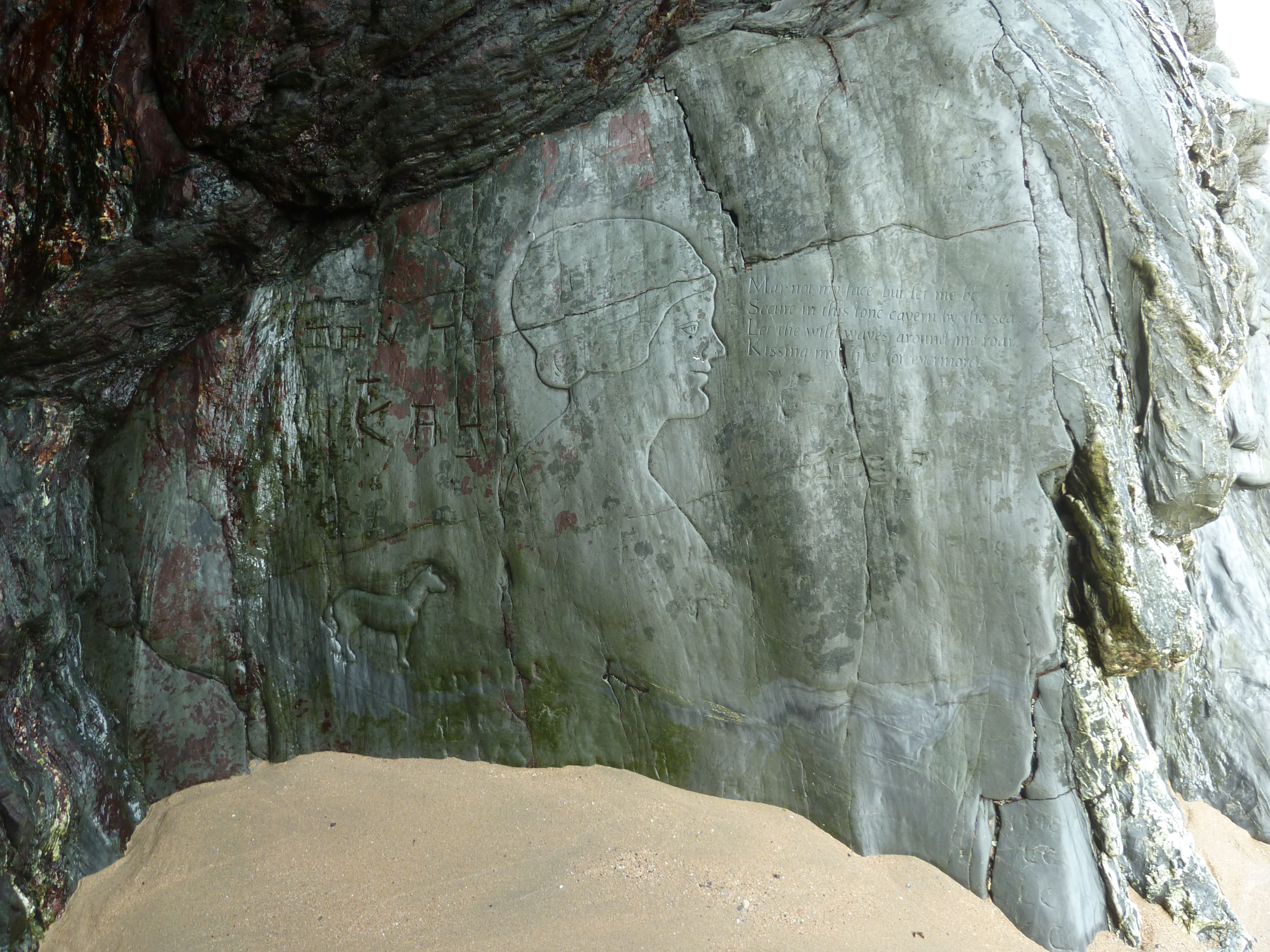
Crantock Beach carving

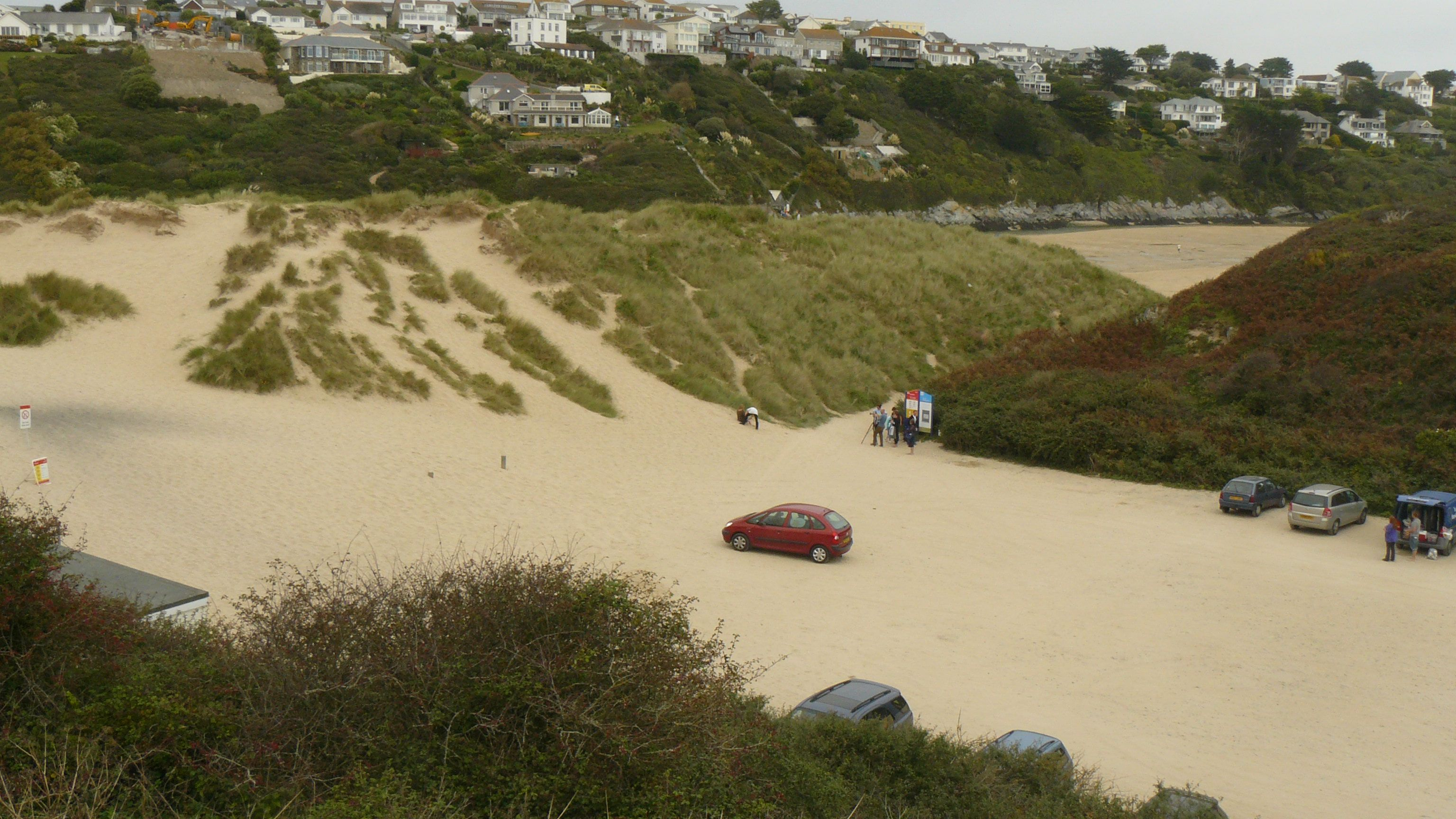
Crantock Bay sand dunes

Like several other sandy beaches in the Newquay area, Crantock Beach is popular for surfing. There are car parks at Crantock Beach and West Pentire. The beach is backed by sand dunes. In 2014 storms caused the collapse of a retaining wall which caused the River Gannel to change course, meandering across the beach. This has resulted in erosion of the base of sand dunes, with the danger of collapse. Since January 2016 the Gannel estuary, including the beach, as far as the tidal limit, has been part of the Newquay and the Gannel Marine Conservation Zone, and the headland, above the beach, at West Pentire is a Site of Special Scientific Interest. In June 2023 part of the beach was closed after the collapse of a section of the 65ft (20m) high dunes.

=== Rock carving ===
At the left hand side of the beach, low tide reveals a carving into a rock, showing a picture of a woman's face, and the inscription "Mar not my face but let me be, Secure in this lone cave by the sea, Let the wild waves around me roar, Kissing my lips for evermore". Supposedly, in the early 20th century a woman was horse riding along Crantock Beach. She and her horse were cut off as the tide came in and the rough seas swept them away, drowning them both. Her distraught lover carved a poem into a rock in a cave on the beach, along with a portrait of his lost love and her horse. The carvings are said to be the work of a local man, Joseph Prater.

It is unclear who Joseph Prater was. The brothers Joseph and William Prater are known to be two members of an artistic family who rented a couple of studio huts on the cliff top above Crantock beach. Another candidate for the artwork is Joseph Henry Prater who worked and lived as a dairyman on his father’s farm just above the cave. The identity of the woman depicted in the carving is also not known, though an Ethel de Medina Greenstreet nee Spender, a journalist, drowned on Crantock Beach in 1904. One source attributes the carving of the horse to be the work of a local man, James Dyer, who created the carving in the 1940s.

=== Coastal footpath ===
The South West Coast Path skirts all along the west side of the parish. Walking from Crantock, the path leads to a sandy cove called Porth Joke, also known as "Polly Joke". Its name comes from the Cornish porth lojowek meaning "cove abounding in vegetation". In later Cornish this became Por Lejowak. This cove is entirely surrounded by National Trust land and has been virtually unchanged over the centuries. Further along the coast path is the village of Holywell, with a larger sandy beach at Holywell Bay.

== Demographics ==
In the 2021 census, Crantock civil parish had a population of 925 people in 422 households.

Census population of Crantock parish
Census	Population	Female	Male	Households	Source
2001	764	414	350	367	
2011	801	417	384	370	
2021	925	465	460	422	

== Culture and community ==
The local village hall has recently undergone a transformation, with money from the National Lottery, the awarding of which was featured on ITV's Westcountry Live television programme. The playing field on which the hall is situated was also given a new lease of life and now includes a basketball hoop, climbing facilities, and cricket and football pitches.

The village hall is now three times larger than it was and was the centrepiece of 2007's annual "Jazz in the Park". The village also hosts a street fair known as the "Crantock Summer Fiesta" which has a coconut shy, tombola, raffle and many other stalls.

In 2006, the village held its second annual "big bale push" involving locals pushing tightly packed straw cylinders around the roads of the village, which are closed for the event. The first event raised over £800 and in the ensuing years the total has grown to over £50,000 which has been donated to key charities close to the heart of the local community.

== Twinning ==
Crantock is twinned with Carantec in Brittany, France.

== See also ==
Places also associated with St Carantoc include:

- Carhampton, Somerset
- Llangrannog, Ceredigion, Wales
