= Canton of Morlaix =

Coordinates: 48.58°N 3.83°W

The canton of Morlaix is an administrative division of the Finistère department, northwestern France. Its borders were modified at the French canton reorganisation which came into effect in March 2015. Its seat is in Morlaix.

It consists of the following communes:

1. Carantec
2. Henvic
3. Locquénolé
4. Morlaix
5. Pleyber-Christ
6. Plounéour-Ménez
7. Sainte-Sève
8. Saint-Martin-des-Champs
9. Saint-Thégonnec Loc-Eguiner
10. Taulé
