= Carannog =

5-6th century Welsh saint, abbot and confessor

Saint Carannog
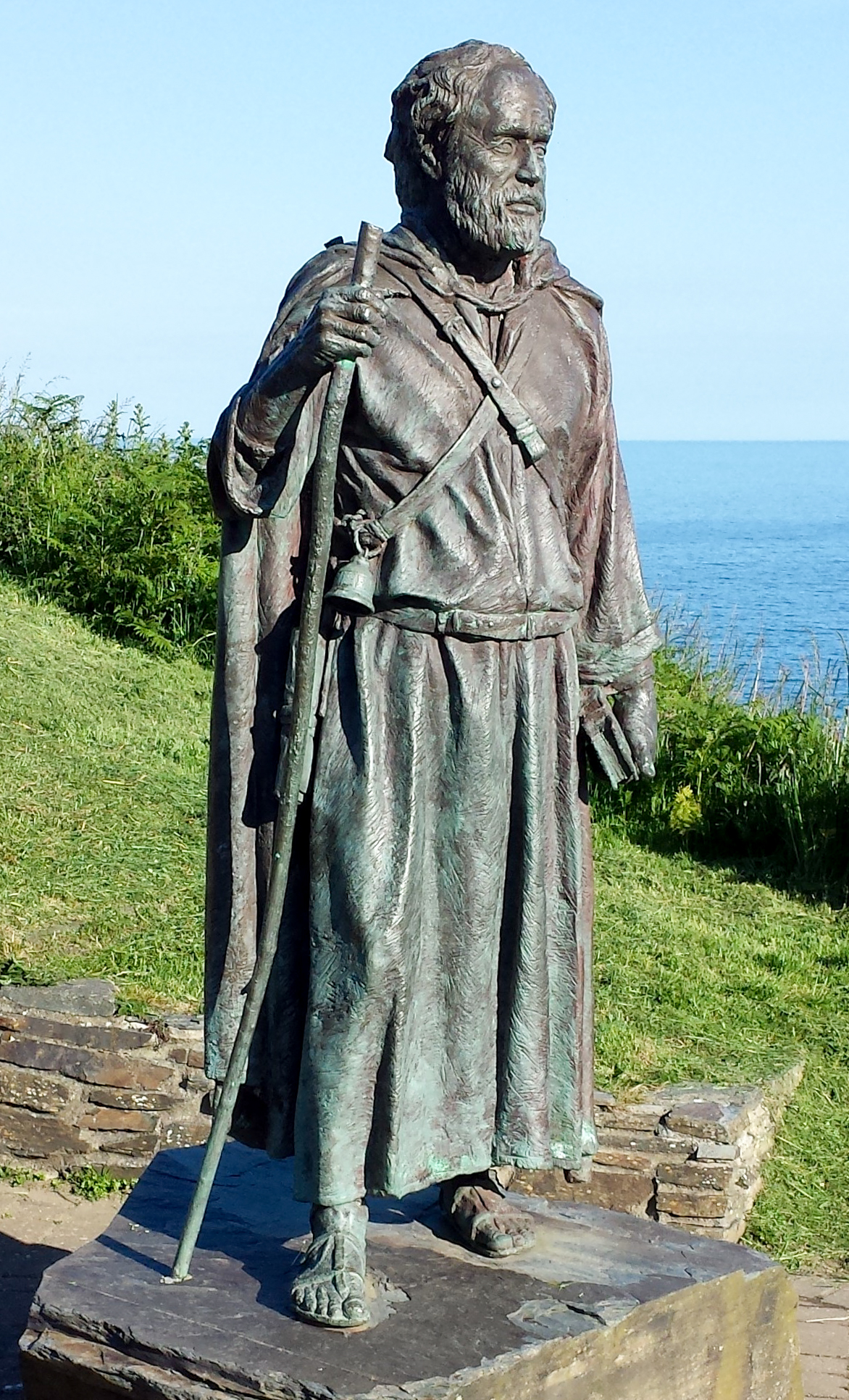
- Statue of St Carannog in Llangrannog
- Born: 5th or 6th century Ceredigion, Wales
- Died: 6th century
- Venerated in: Catholic Church; Eastern Orthodox Church
- Feast: 16 May

Carannog (Old Welsh:Carantog; Breton: Karanteg; Latin: Carantocus; Irish: Cairnech, also anglicised as Carantoc or Carantock) was a 6th-century Welsh saint, abbot and confessor. He is the founder of the Llan at Llangrannog in Ceredigion, Wales, as well as other monastic sites across Somerset, Cornwall, Brittany and Ireland.

Carannog's is one of six Welsh saints whose Vitae are potentially evidence of an Historical King Arthur written independently of Geoffrey of Monmouth's Historia Regum Britanniae. He is venerated by the Eastern Orthodox Church and Roman Catholic Church.

== Life and historicity ==
Most of the details of Carannog's life are taken from his two twelfth-century hagiographies, the Vita Prima Sancti Carantoci and Vita Secunda Sancti Carantoci, as well as his 15th-century Vita in the Léon Breviary, the vitae of associated saints and as part of Welsh tradition.

Each of these works state that Carannog is a prince of the ruling house of the Kingdom of Ceredigion, either as the direct son of Cunedda Wledig, or as his grandson via Queen Meleri and King Ceredig. Like many Welsh saints, Carannog rejects his royal inheritance and instead devotes his life to God. To escape being elected king, the young Prince escapes to Llangrannog, before travelling across the sea to aid in the conversion of Ireland to Christianity. Here he followed Saint Patrick in leading the early Irish Christians in their fight against the druids, earning the name "Carus Cernachus" (Dear Crannog) in the process. Carannog returned to Britain and founded religious communities in the South West, before also traveling to Brittany.

== Venerations ==
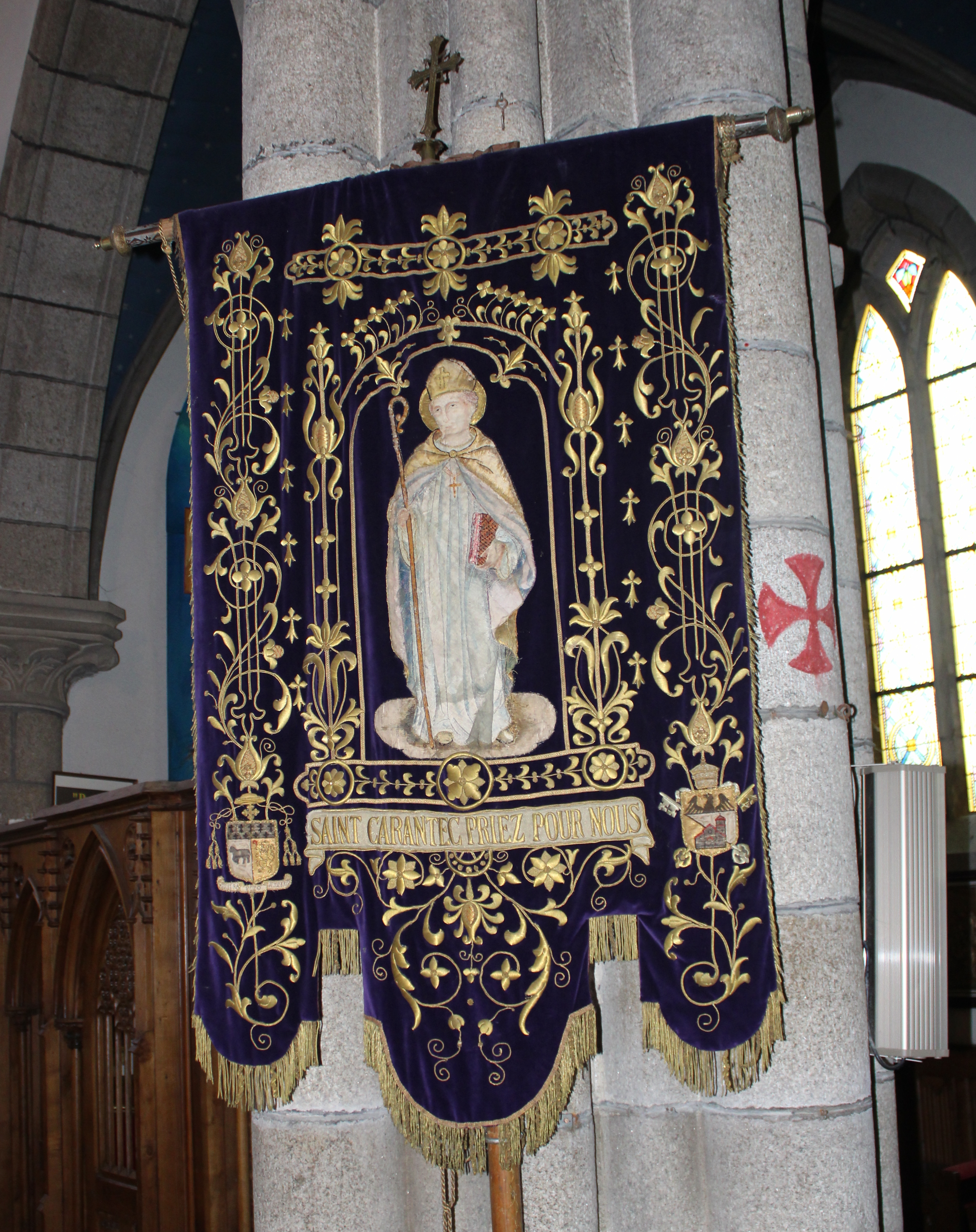
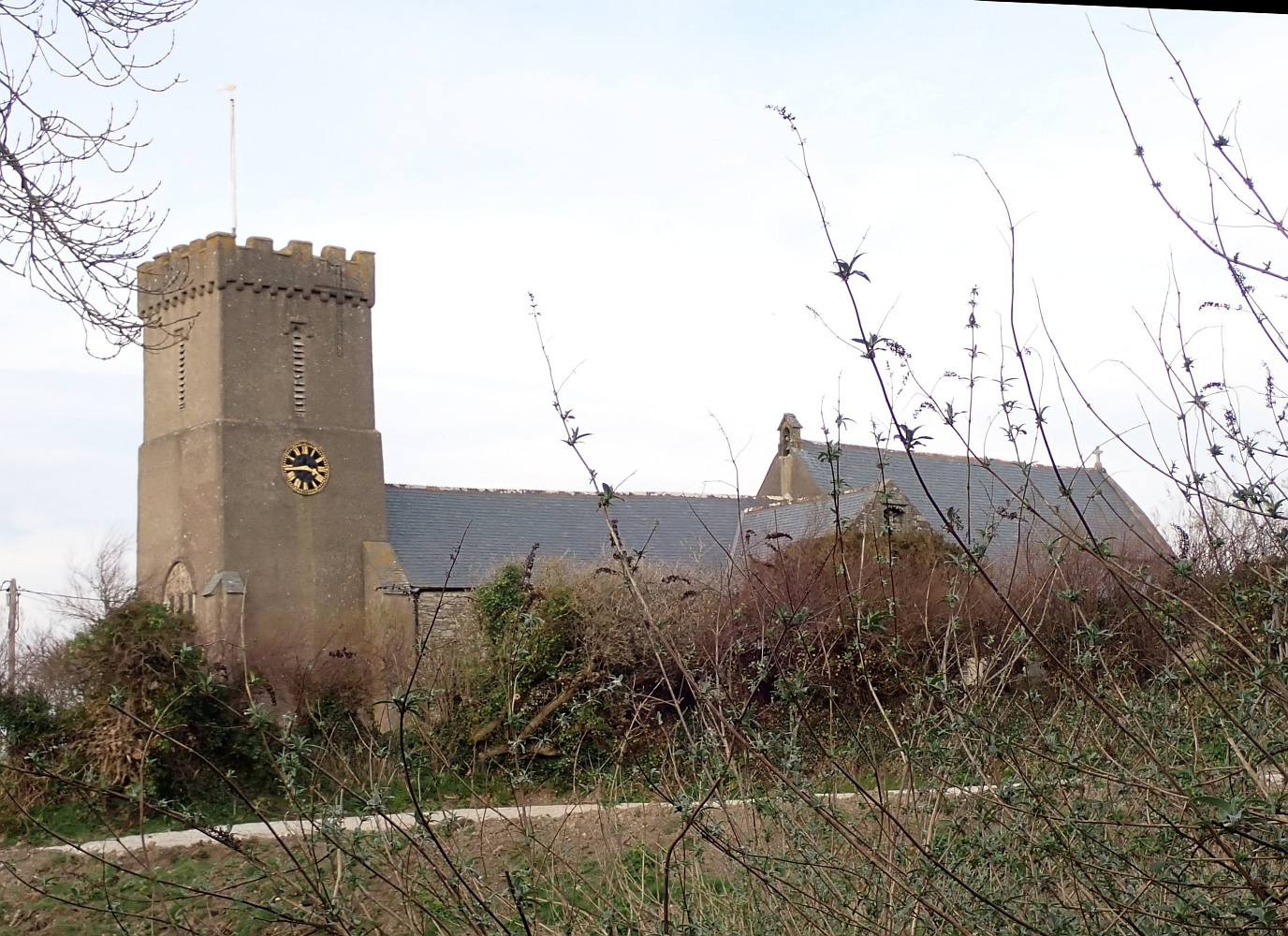
A banner depicting Saint Carannog at Carantec, Brittany and St Carantoc's Church, Crantock, Cornwall

While the main site of Carannog's exaltation is at Llangrannog in Ceredigion, he is venerated throughout the Celtic world, at sites in Cornwall, Ireland, at Carhampton in Somerset and at numerous sites around Brittany, such as Carantec . In each of these places, the saint's feast day is always given as the 16th May (the traditional date of Carannog's death) or 17th May (the traditional date of Carannog's burial), suggesting that the local traditions are based on the same historical figure rather than numerous local saints who merely shared the name.

The "Carantacus Stone" is a 6th-century gravestone bearing the inscription "CARANTACUS", discovered in 1745 at St Michael's churchyard, Llandre-Egremont. The stone had been built into the wall of the new St Michael's Church by 1889 before being set into the floor at the east end of the nave of St Tysilio's Church, where it is situated today. While it remains uncertain if this marks the gravestone of Saint Carannog or a contemporaneous namesake, the later addition of a Medieval Latin cross suggests the memorial was revered as a religious relic for a number of years.

== Carannog and Arthur ==
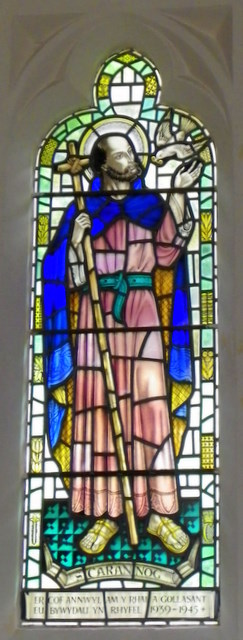
Stained glass of St Carannog, at St Carannog's Church, Llangrannog

Carannog's Vitae are among the earliest written sources for King Arthur. Carannog is said to have been travelling from his home in Ceredigion to South West England when, attempting to cross the Severn, his portable altar was lost to the waves. Travelling onwards through Dumnonia, Carannog is summoned to meet Cadwy, Duke of Cornwall and King Arthur himself, who is residing at Din Draithou (modern Dunster in Somerset). Carannog gives Arthur a blessing and learns that the great king has been in the area for some time, devoting all his energies to hunting and killing a monstrous dragon, which is devastating the land of Carrum (modern Carhampton). Arthur, however, is unable to even locate the dragon or its lair and calls upon Carannog to aid in his task by finding the creature and bringing it to him. In return, the king will help Carannog locate the lost altar.

Carannog agrees and decides to try to summon the hidden dragon to him through prayer, the elusive creature soon rushes to him with a great noise, like a calf running to its mother, before reverently bowing its head before him. Carannog leads the creature to Arthur's fortress, where, seeing it is docile and subdued by the power of God, he banishes it from the land of Carrum, and it is never seen again. Carannog then finds that his altar is in Arthur's possession, and that the king is attempting to use it as a table. However, the altar magically flings from its surface anything that is placed upon it. Impressed by Crannog's conduct and saintly deeds, Arthur not only agrees to return the altar, but also gives all the land of Carrum to Crannog, who builds a monastery on the site.

== Sources ==
- Doble, Gilbert H. (1965). The Saints of Cornwall Part Four. Truro: Dean and Chapter of Truro.
- Lives of the Cambro British saints, William Jenkins Rees, Thomas Wakeman, 1835
- Bradley, Henry (1887). "Carantacus" . In Stephen, Leslie (ed.). Dictionary of National Biography. Vol. 9. London: Smith, Elder & Co.
