= Corbières =

Corbières may refer to:

- Corbières, Aude, Aude department, France
- Corbières, Gruyère, a municipality in Switzerland
- Corbières AOC, a French wine appellation
- Corbières Massif, a mountain region in the Languedoc-Roussillon in France
- Corbières-en-Provence, Alpes-de-Haute-Provence department, France

== See also ==
- Canton of Les Corbières
- Canton of Les Corbières Méditerranée
- Corbière (disambiguation)
