= Édouard Corbière =

French author and sailor (1793–1875)

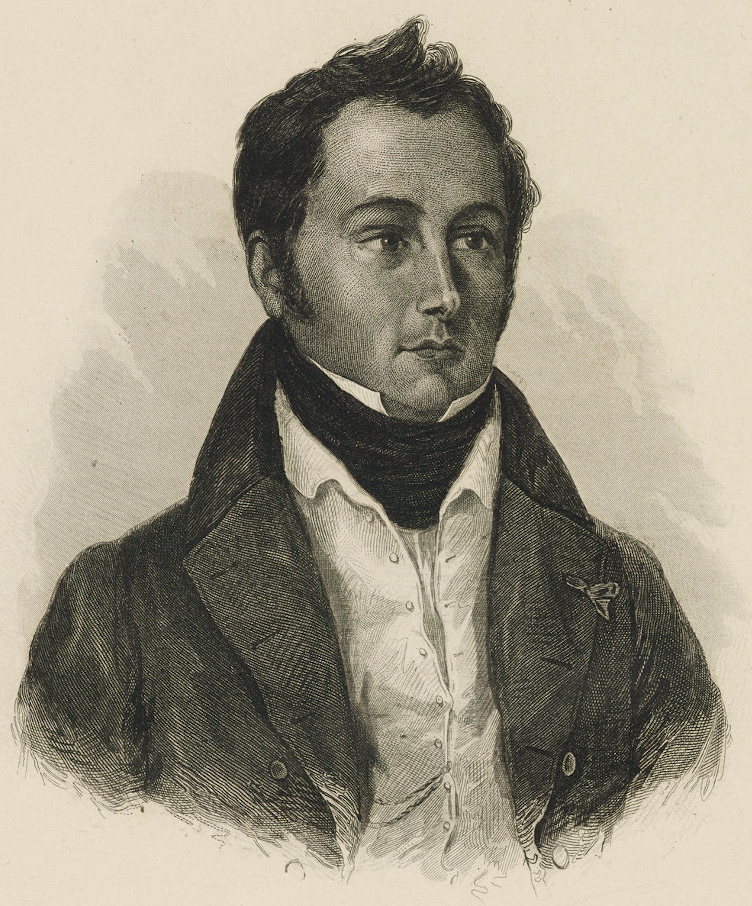
- Born: 1 April 1793
- Died: 27 September 1875
- Occupations: Journalist, writer, sailor

Jean Antoine René Édouard Corbière (1 April 1793 in Brest – 27 September 1875 in Morlaix) was a French sailor, shipowner, journalist and writer, considered to be the father of the French maritime novel. He was the father of poet Tristan Corbière.

== Life ==
=== Early years ===
The Corbière family originated in Valès, a hamlet in the Haut-Languedoc (now part of the commune of Le Bez, to the east of Castres, in the Tarn département). At the time of Édouard's birth his father was an infantry captain in the French Navy - his mother, Jeanne-Renée Dubois, had been born at Morlaix in 1768. Édouard was the third of four children.

On his father's death in 1802, the young Édouard had no choice but to enter the navy to provide a family income. He became a mousse in 1804, a novice in 1806, and an aspirant in 1807 before being captured by the British on 8 May 1811. He was a prisoner on parole at Tiverton, Devon, until November 1811 when he was sent to Stapleton Prison near Bristol. He was repatriated to France because of ill-health in July 1812. He was ejected from the navy on the Bourbon Restoration due to his liberal views and started writing pamphlets, leading him into several stand-offs with the law, firstly at Brest in 1819 due to his writings in La Guêpe, then at Rouen in 1823 in La Nacelle. The latter forced him to become a sailor again, this time in the merchant navy. He sailed for ten years as a long-distance captain of the Nina (an old three-master captured from the British), mainly between Le Havre and Martinique.

=== Literary debut ===
He gave up sea-service for good in 1828, landing in Le Havre, where he was immediately approached by Stanislas Faure, manager of the Journal du Havre newspaper, and asked to become its editor, a post he held until 1839 and for which he wrote until 1843. Under his leadership this daily newspaper rose from a tiny advertisements sheet into a first-rank organ for commercial and maritime information.

In the meantime he wrote several novels, the best-known of which, Le Négrier (1832), gained him national fame in France. In 1839 the Finistère steam-packet company (Compagnie des paquebots à vapeur du Finistère) began operating between Le Havre and Morlaix - Corbière was one of its administrators, then its director, until his death.

=== Final years ===
In 1844, his marriage to Marie-Angélique-Aspasie Puyo, younger daughter of his friend, the merchant Joachim Puyo, négociant, led Corbière to settle for good at Morlaix. He launched a regatta in 1851, then unsuccessfully proposed starting a national subscription for France to send a yacht to the regatta around the Isle of Wight at which, on 22 August 1851, the schooner America won the trophy later renamed the America's Cup. Corbière was also a member of the municipal council of Morlaix in 1855 and 1860. Entering the Chamber of Commerce in 1848, he was its vice-president from 1866 to 1868, then its president from 1868 to March 1875.

A few months before his death, Corbière was profoundly affected by the death of his eldest son Édouard-Joachim (better known as Tristan Corbière). Corbière's death was an occasion for public mourning in both Morlaix and Le Havre. The steam-packet company's ship Morlaix and the other ships sailing out of the ports of Finistère, all flew their flags at half mast, while the Morlaix herself carried Corbière's coffin, which was then taken ashore by sailors. In 1880, a short road in central Le Havre was renamed after Corbière and later Brest, Morlaix (1905) and Roscoff (1911) did the same. In 1906, the steam-packet company decided to name its fifth and last ship Édouard Corbière. The shipping company founded by Corbière in 1839 disappeared in 1921, after the French state failed to fully reimburse it for the loss of its last ship, torpedoed in the Mediterranean in 1917.

== Works ==
- À la Liberté publique, dithyramb, 1819 Online text
- Le Dix-Neuvième Siècle, political satire, 1819 Online text
- La Marotte des Ultra, ou Recueil des chansons patriotiques, 1819 Online text
- Trois Jours d'une mission à Brest, 1819
- La Lanterne magique, pièce curieuse représentant la Chambre des Députés de 1819, 1819 Online text
- Les Philippiques françaises, poem, 1820
- Notre Âge, satire, 1821
- Élégies brésiliennes, suivies de Poésies diverses, et d'une Notice sur la traite des noirs, 1823 Online text
- Brésiliennes, 1825 Online text
- Corbière à Corbière. Épître à Son Excellence le comte de Corbière, 1827
- Poésies de Tibulle, French verse translation of the poems of Tibullus, 1829
- Les Pilotes de l'Iroise, maritime novel, 1832
- Contes de bord, 1833 Online text
- La Mer et les marins, maritime scenes, 1833 Online text
- Le Prisonnier de guerre, maritime novel, 1834
- Le Négrier, aventures de mer, 4 vol., 1834 Online text 1 2 3 4
- Scènes de mer, 2 vol., 1835 Online text 1 2
- Le Banian, maritime novel, 2 vol., 1836
- Les Folles-brises, 2 vol., 1838 Online text 1 2
- Les Trois Pirates, 2 vol., 1838
- Tribord et bâbord, maritime novel, 2 vol., 1840 Online text 1 2
- Pelaio, roman maritime, 2 vol., 1843 Online text 1 2
- Les Îlots de Martin Vaz, maritime novel, 2 vol., 1843 Online text 1 2
- Cric-Crac, maritime novel, 2 vol., 1846 Online text 1 2
- Pétition maritime à l'Assemblée nationale, 1848
- Questions soumises à l'enquête sur la marine marchande, 1851
