= West Pentire =

Hamlet in Cornwall, England

Coordinates: 50°24′09″N 5°07′43″W

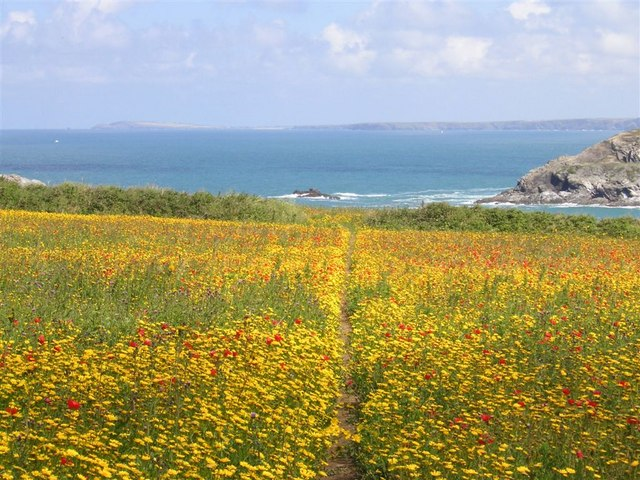
West Pentire Fields in bloom

West Pentire (Cornish: Pentir, meaning promontory) is a hamlet on the north coast of Cornwall in England, United Kingdom. It is located within the civil parish of Crantock, 2.5 miles (4.0 km) west of the town of Newquay.

To the west of the hamlet are the West Pentire Fields, which have been designated as an Important Plant Area, by the organisation Plantlife, for its arable flora, especially poppies and corn marigolds. These fields are owned by the National Trust.
