= Sainte-Sève =

Sainte-Sève Sant-Seo
- Commune
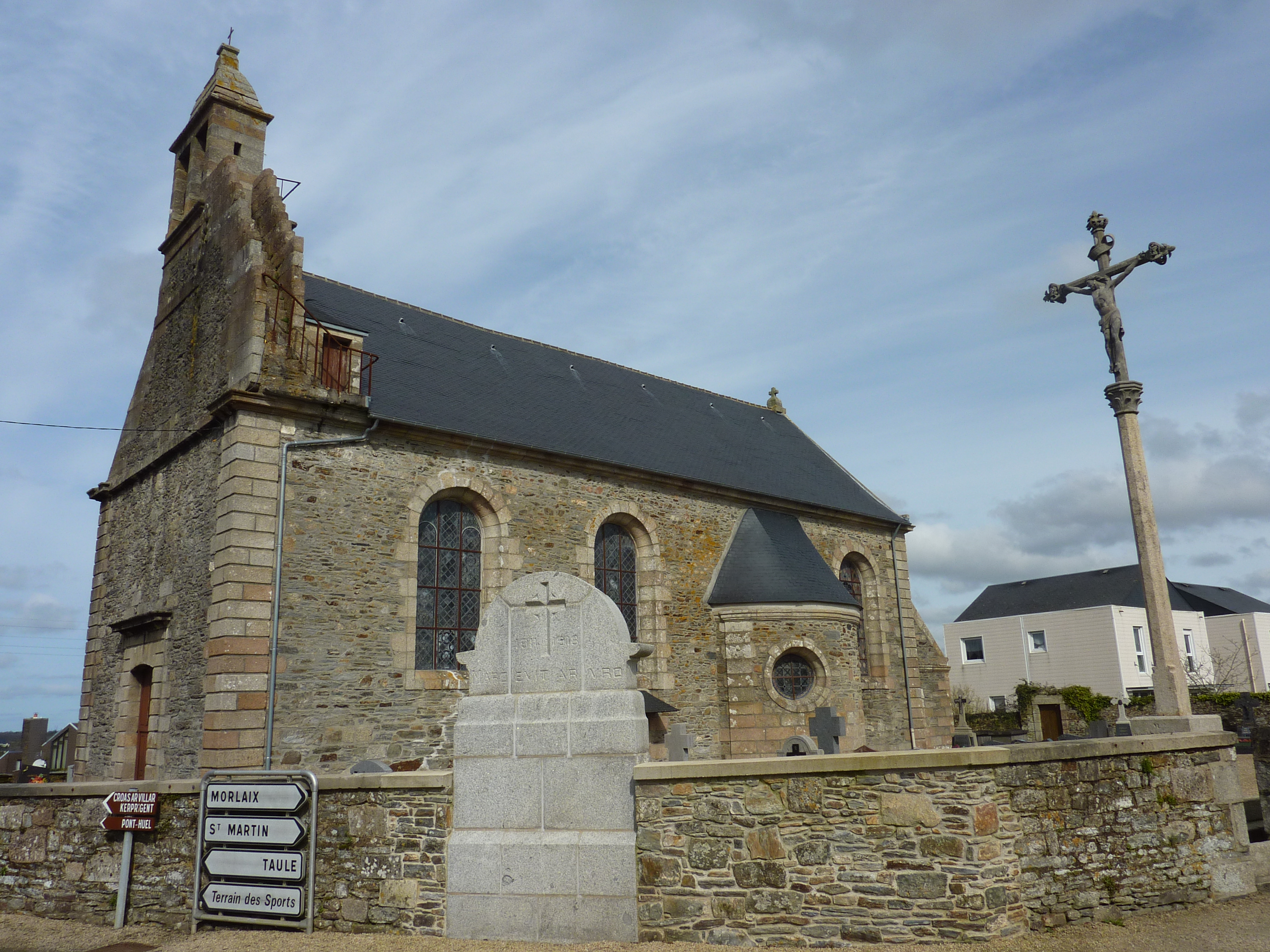
- The parish church in Sainte-Sève
- Location of Sainte-Sève
- Location within France Location within Brittany
- Coordinates: 48°33′32″N 3°52′25″W
- Country: France
- Region: Brittany
- Department: Finistère
- Arrondissement: Morlaix
- Canton: Morlaix
- Intercommunality: Morlaix Communauté

Government
  - Mayor (2023–2026): Anne Marie Kerviel
- Area^{1}: 9.98 km^{2} (3.85 sq mi)
- Highest elevation: 121 m (397 ft)
- Lowest elevation: 29 m (95 ft)
- Population (2023): 1,077
  - Density: 108/km^{2} (280/sq mi)
- Time zone: UTC+01:00 (CET)
  - Summer (DST): UTC+02:00 (CEST)
- INSEE/Postal code: 29265 /29600
- ^{1} French Land Register data, which excludes lakes, ponds, glaciers > 1 km^{2} (0.386 sq mi or 247 acres) and river estuaries.

Sainte-Sève (French pronunciation: [sɛ̃t sɛv]; Breton: Sant-Seo) is a commune in the Finistère department of Brittany in north-western France.

== Population ==
Historical population
Year	Pop.	±% p.a.
1968	318	—
1975	525	+7.42%
1982	745	+5.13%
1990	842	+1.54%
1999	787	−0.75%
2007	867	+1.22%
2012	908	+0.93%
2017	1,016	+2.27%
2023	1,077	+0.98%
Source: INSEE

Inhabitants of Sainte-Sève are called in French Saint-Sévistes.

== See also ==
- Communes of the Finistère department
