= Locquénolé =

Locquénolé Lokenole
- Commune
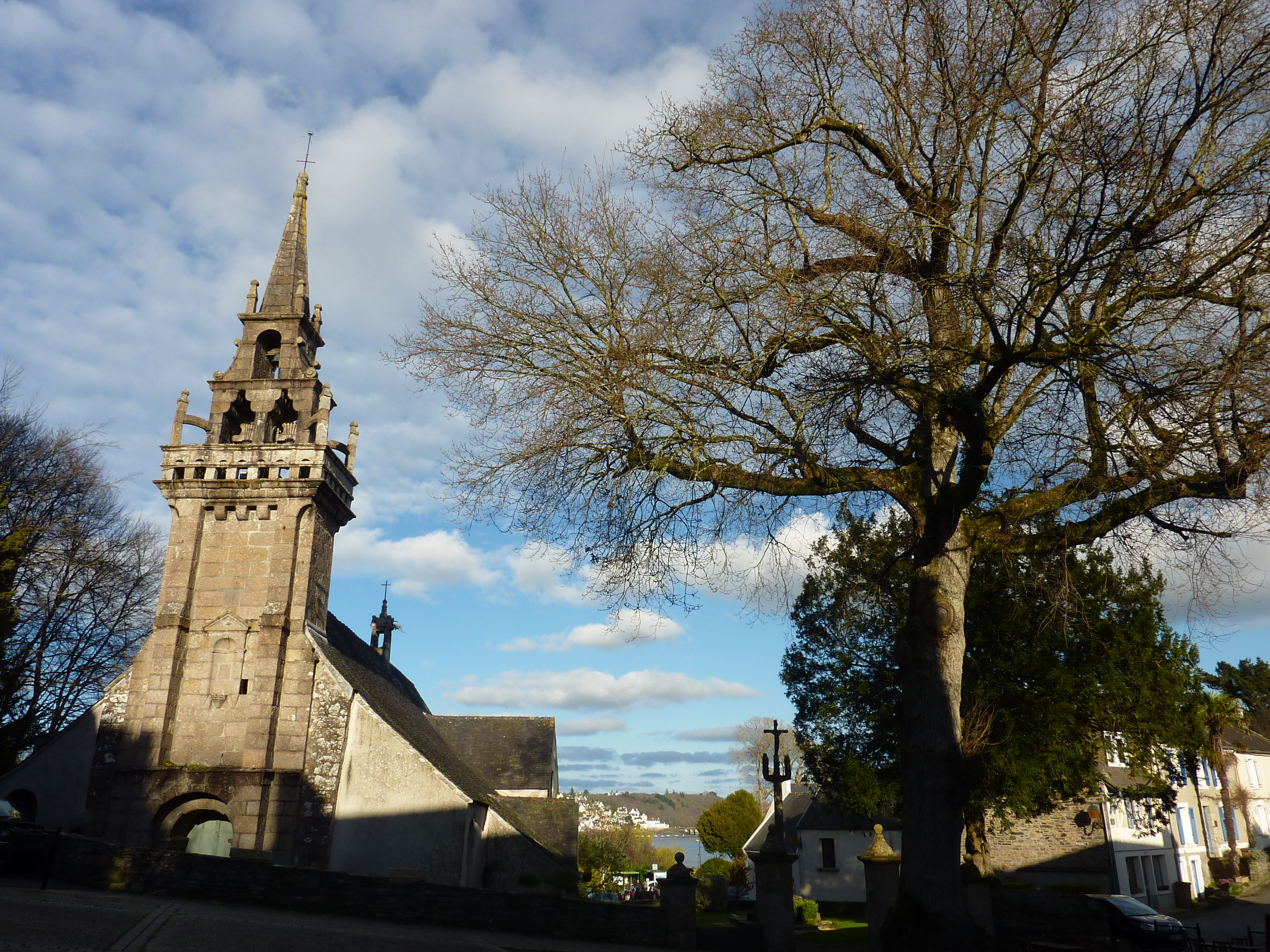
- The church of Saint-Guénolé
- Location of Locquénolé
- Location within France Location within Brittany
- Coordinates: 48°37′31″N 3°51′34″W
- Country: France
- Region: Brittany
- Department: Finistère
- Arrondissement: Morlaix
- Canton: Morlaix
- Intercommunality: Morlaix Communauté

Government
  - Mayor (2020–2026): Francis Lebrault
- Area^{1}: 0.85 km^{2} (0.33 sq mi)
- Highest elevation: 81 m (266 ft)
- Lowest elevation: 0 m (0 ft)
- Population (2023): 790
  - Density: 930/km^{2} (2,400/sq mi)
- Time zone: UTC+01:00 (CET)
  - Summer (DST): UTC+02:00 (CEST)
- INSEE/Postal code: 29132 /29670
- ^{1} French Land Register data, which excludes lakes, ponds, glaciers > 1 km^{2} (0.386 sq mi or 247 acres) and river estuaries.

Locquénolé (French pronunciation: [lɔkenɔle]; Breton: Lokenole) is a commune in the Finistère department of Brittany in north-western France.

== Toponymy ==
From the Breton lok which means hermitage (cf.: Locminé), and Guénolé a Breton saint.

== Landmarks ==
Church of Saint-Guénolé, this Latin-cross-shaped church dates back to the 11th century. It features Romanesque capitals and a distinctive bell tower completed in 1681.

== Population ==
Historical population
Year	Pop.	±% p.a.
1968	615	—
1975	631	+0.37%
1982	648	+0.38%
1990	726	+1.43%
1999	716	−0.15%
2007	736	+0.34%
2012	826	+2.33%
2017	787	−0.96%
2023	790	+0.06%
Source: INSEE

Inhabitants of Locquénolé are called in French Locquénolésiens.

== See also ==
- Communes of the Finistère department
