= Tristan Corbière =

French poet (1845–1875)

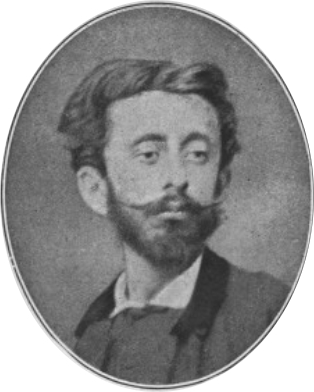
- Portrait of Tristan Corbière, ca. 1865
- Born: Édouard-Joachim Corbière; 18 July 1845; Morlaix, Brittany, France
- Died: 1 March 1875 (aged 29); Morlaix, Brittany, France
- Occupation: Poet
- Writing career
- Genre: Poetry
- Notable work: Les Amours jaunes
- Literary movement: Symbolism

Tristan Corbière (18 July 1845 – 1 March 1875), born Édouard-Joachim Corbière, was a French poet born in Coat-Congar, Ploujean (now part of Morlaix) in Brittany, where he lived most of his life before dying of tuberculosis at the age of 29. He was a French poet, close to Symbolism, and a figure of the "cursed poet".

He is the author of a single collection of poetry, Les Amours jaunes, and of a few prose pieces. He led a mostly marginal and miserable life, nourished by two major failures due to his bone disease and his "ugliness" which he enjoyed accusing: the first is his sentimental life (he only loved one woman, called "Marcelle" in his work), and the second being his passion for the sea (he dreamt of becoming a sailor, like his father, Édouard Corbière). His poetry carries these two great wounds which led him to adopt a very cynical and incisive style, towards himself as much towards the life and world around him.

He died at the age of 29, possibly from tuberculosis, a childless bachelor with no work, entrenched in his old Breton manor, misunderstood by his contemporaries, and his innovative poetry was not recognised until well after his death.

== Family and schooling ==
His mother, Marie-Angélique-Aspasie Puyo, was 19 years old at the time of his birth, and belonged to one of the most prominent families of the local bourgeoisie. His father was Antoine-Édouard Corbière, mariner and writer known for his best-selling novel Le Négrier. A cousin, Constant Puyo, was a well-known Pictorialist photographer.

During his schooling at the Imperial Lycée of Saint-Brieuc where he studied from 1858 until 1860, he fell prey to a deep depression, and, over several freezing winters, contracted the severe rheumatism which was to disfigure him. He blamed his parents for having placed him there, far from his family's care and affection. Difficulties in adapting to the harsh discipline of the college's noble débris (distinguished relics, i.e., teachers) gradually developed those characteristics of anarchic disdain and sarcasm which were to give much of his verse their distinctive voice.

== Poetry ==
Corbière first used the pseudonym Tristan as early as 1865, and at latest in 1867, when he signed a poem, La Balancelle, as Édouard Tristan Corbière. The allusion is perhaps to the Tristan of legend. If so, Corbière's life and work would gain a bathos lent to it by reference to a hero of tragedy.

Corbière's only published verse in his lifetime appeared in Les amours jaunes, 1873, a volume that went almost unnoticed until Paul Verlaine included him in his gallery of poètes maudits (accursed poets). Thereafter Verlaine's recommendation was enough to establish him as one of the masters acknowledged by the Symbolists, and he was subsequently rediscovered and treated as a predecessor by the surrealists.

Close-packed, linked to the ocean and his Breton roots, and tinged with disdain for Romantic sentimentalism, his work is also characterised by its idiomatic play and exceptional modernity. He was praised by both Ezra Pound and T. S. Eliot (whose work he had a great influence on).

Eliot used his self-description as "Mélange adultère de tout" as the title for one of his own (French) poems. Many subsequent modernist poets have also studied him, and he has often been translated into English.

His complete poems appear in two volumes with translations by the English poet Christopher Pilling.

A very precise commented version of Les Amours jaunes was published in 1993 by Elisabeth Aragon and Claude Bonnin for the Presses universitaires de l'université de Toulouse-Le Mirail. It is now on open and free access: https://new-pum.univ-tlse2.fr/wp-content/uploads/2020/05/Les_amours_jaunes.pdf

== See also ==
- Charles Baudelaire
- Orientalism
