= Henvic =

Henvic Henvig
- Commune
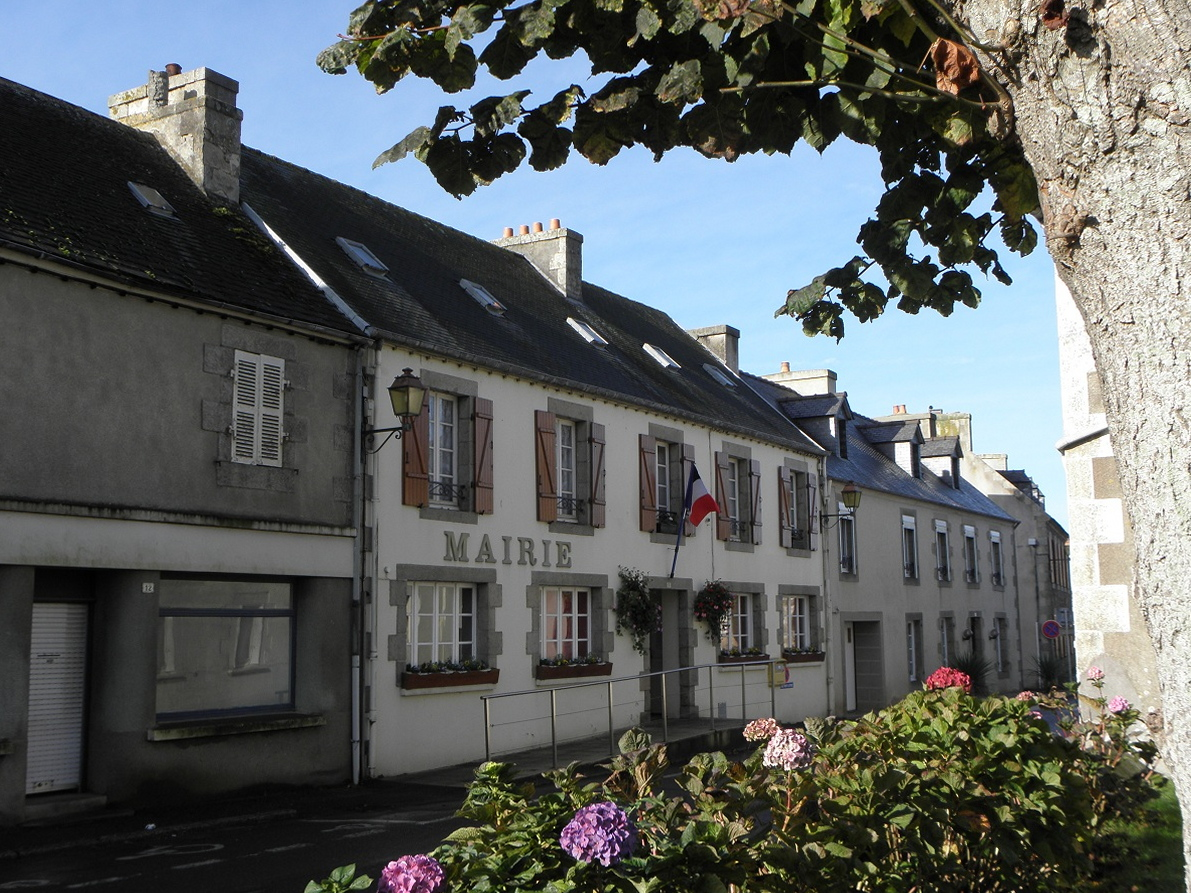
- The town hall in Henvic

- Coat of arms
- Location of Henvic
- Location within France Location within Brittany
- Coordinates: 48°37′59″N 3°55′36″W
- Country: France
- Region: Brittany
- Department: Finistère
- Arrondissement: Morlaix
- Canton: Morlaix
- Intercommunality: Morlaix Communauté

Government
  - Mayor (2020–2026): Christophe Micheau
- Area^{1}: 9.95 km^{2} (3.84 sq mi)
- Highest elevation: 80 m (260 ft)
- Lowest elevation: 0 m (0 ft)
- Population (2023): 1,181
  - Density: 119/km^{2} (307/sq mi)
- Time zone: UTC+01:00 (CET)
  - Summer (DST): UTC+02:00 (CEST)
- INSEE/Postal code: 29079 /29670
- ^{1} French Land Register data, which excludes lakes, ponds, glaciers > 1 km^{2} (0.386 sq mi or 247 acres) and river estuaries.

Henvic (French pronunciation: [ɛ̃vik]; Breton: Henvig) is a commune in the Finistère department of Brittany in north-western France.

== Population ==
Historical population
Year	Pop.	±% p.a.
1968	1,216	—
1975	1,145	−0.86%
1982	1,222	+0.93%
1990	1,265	+0.43%
1999	1,174	−0.83%
2007	1,313	+1.41%
2012	1,303	−0.15%
2017	1,351	+0.73%
2023	1,181	−2.22%
Source: INSEE

Inhabitants of Henvic are called in French Henvicois.

== See also ==
- Communes of the Finistère department
