= Taulé =

Taulé Taole
- Commune
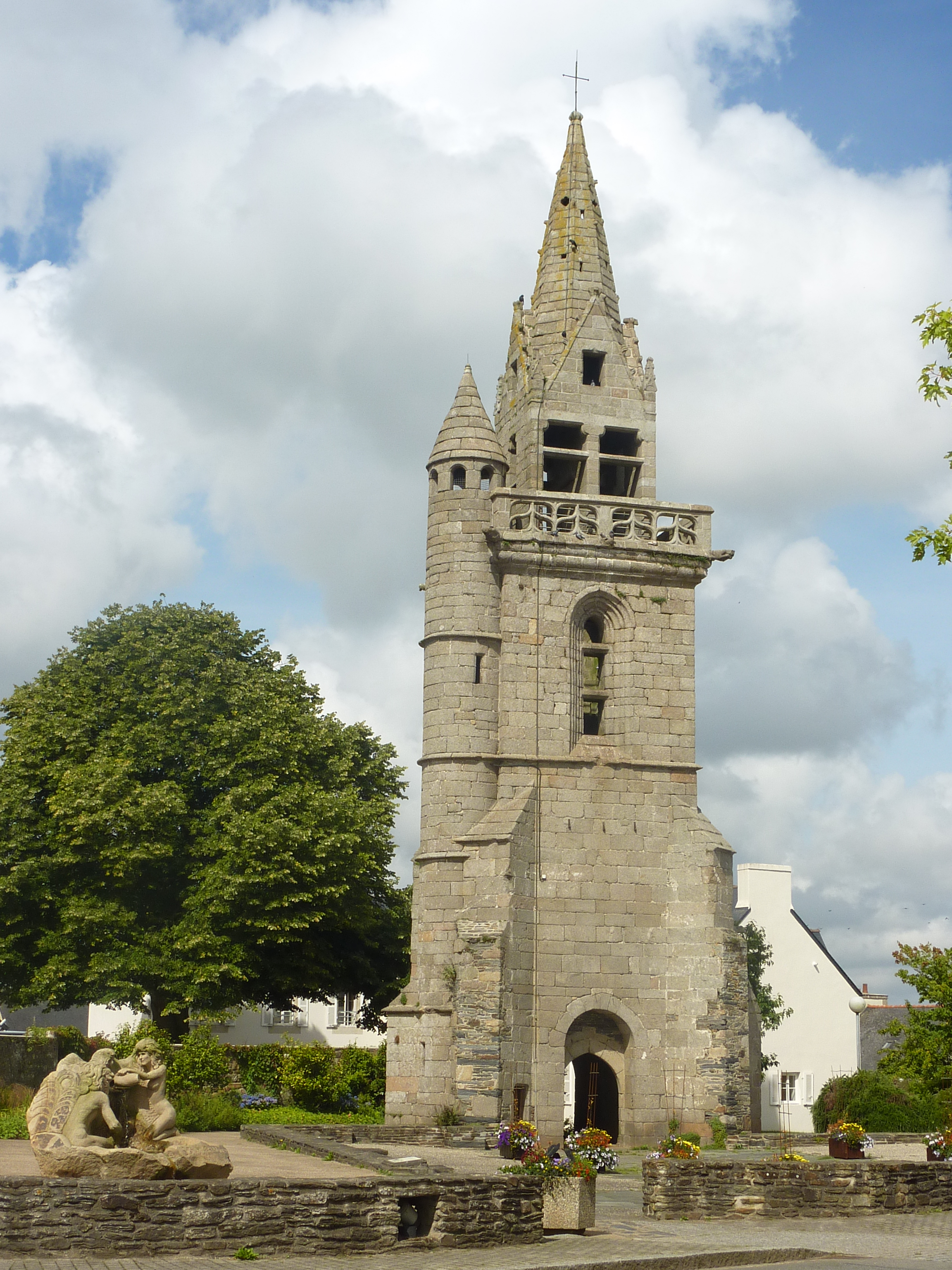
- The old church tower in Taulé

- Coat of arms
- Location of Taulé
- Location within France Location within Brittany
- Coordinates: 48°36′16″N 3°53′56″W
- Country: France
- Region: Brittany
- Department: Finistère
- Arrondissement: Morlaix
- Canton: Morlaix
- Intercommunality: Morlaix Communauté

Government
  - Mayor (2020–2026): Gilles Creach
- Area^{1}: 29.47 km^{2} (11.38 sq mi)
- Highest elevation: 101 m (331 ft)
- Lowest elevation: 0 m (0 ft)
- Population (2023): 2,914
  - Density: 98.88/km^{2} (256.1/sq mi)
- Time zone: UTC+01:00 (CET)
  - Summer (DST): UTC+02:00 (CEST)
- INSEE/Postal code: 29279 /29670
- ^{1} French Land Register data, which excludes lakes, ponds, glaciers > 1 km^{2} (0.386 sq mi or 247 acres) and river estuaries.

Taulé (French pronunciation: [tole]; Breton: Taole) is a commune in the Finistère department of Brittany in north-western France.

== Population ==
Inhabitants of Taulé are called Taulésiens in French.

Historical population

Year	Pop.	±% p.a.
1793	2,495	—
1800	2,160	−2.04%
1806	2,407	+1.82%
1821	2,603	+0.52%
1831	2,572	−0.12%
1836	2,892	+2.37%
1841	2,905	+0.09%
1846	3,027	+0.83%
1851	3,037	+0.07%
1856	2,891	−0.98%
1861	2,886	−0.03%
1866	2,817	−0.48%
1872	2,808	−0.05%
1876	2,801	−0.06%
1881	3,004	+1.41%
1886	2,972	−0.21%
1891	2,967	−0.03%
1896	2,815	−1.05%
1901	2,711	−0.75%

Year	Pop.	±% p.a.
1906	2,652	−0.44%
1911	2,838	+1.36%
1921	2,670	−0.61%
1926	2,755	+0.63%
1931	2,872	+0.84%
1936	2,882	+0.07%
1946	2,850	−0.11%
1954	2,446	−1.89%
1962	2,365	−0.42%
1968	2,269	−0.69%
1975	2,402	+0.82%
1982	2,722	+1.80%
1990	2,796	+0.34%
1999	2,781	−0.06%
2007	2,883	+0.45%
2012	2,966	+0.57%
2017	2,938	−0.19%
2023	2,914	−0.14%

Source: EHESS and INSEE (1968-2023)

== See also ==
- Communes of the Finistère department
