= Morlaix =

Morlaix Montroulez (Breton)
- Subprefecture and commune
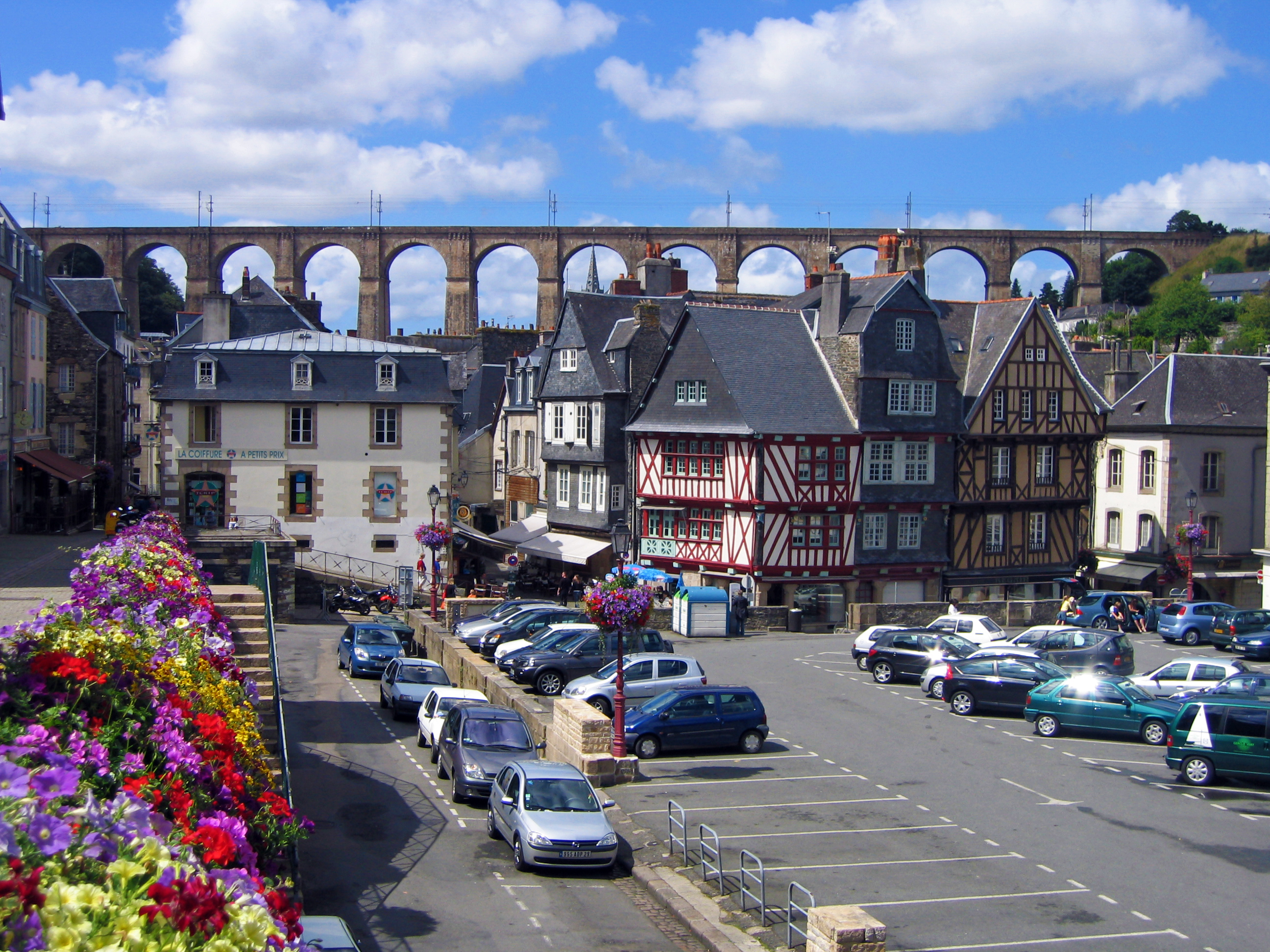
- Morlaix with its viaduct in the background

- Coat of arms
- Location of Morlaix
- Location within France Location within Brittany
- Coordinates: 48°34′42″N 3°49′36″W
- Country: France
- Region: Brittany
- Department: Finistère
- Arrondissement: Morlaix
- Canton: Morlaix
- Intercommunality: Morlaix Communauté

Government
  - Mayor (2026–32): Jean-Paul Vermot
- Area^{1}: 24.82 km^{2} (9.58 sq mi)
- Highest elevation: 104 m (341 ft)
- Lowest elevation: 0 m (0 ft)
- Population (2023): 15,194
  - Density: 612.2/km^{2} (1,586/sq mi)
- Time zone: UTC+01:00 (CET)
  - Summer (DST): UTC+02:00 (CEST)
- INSEE/Postal code: 29151 /29600
- ^{1} French Land Register data, which excludes lakes, ponds, glaciers > 1 km^{2} (0.386 sq mi or 247 acres) and river estuaries.

Morlaix (French pronunciation: [mɔʁlɛ]; Breton: Montroulez, pronounced [mɔ̃tˈʁuːles]) is a commune in the Finistère department of Brittany in northwestern France. It is a sub-prefecture of the department.

== History ==
The Battle of Morlaix, part of the Hundred Years' War, was fought near the town on 30 September 1342 between the English under William de Bohun, Earl of Northampton and the French under Charles, Duke of Brittany. The result was an English victory and has been viewed by historians as presaging the battle tactics of the Battle of Crécy four years later.

== Leisure and tourism ==
The old quarter of the town has winding streets of cobbled stones and overhanging houses constructed of stone and timber. Many have religious and secular sculptures on their façades.

One of these houses is "la Maison dite de la duchesse Anne", or the "so-called Duchess Anne’s house", which is now a museum, open to the public. This house is said to be one of the oldest in the town. Local legend has it that it derives its name from the fact that the Duchesse Anne of Brittany visited the house during her Tro Breizh pilgrimage. This seems unlikely, though, as construction on the house started in the 1520s and Anne of Brittany died in 1514.

The Museum of the Jacobins in Morlaix, housed in a former convent, traces the history of Finistère.

Morlaix is a popular location for sea sports enthusiasts with a diverse array of activities on offer including surfing, sand buggying and kite flying. Visitors can also find beautiful coastal paths for walks. Inland activities include bowling, golf, horse-riding and many more. There are also a cinema and a swimming pool.

=== Marina ===
A tidal river that almost completely dries out at low tide reaches the town of Morlaix where there is a lock into a marina.

== Transport ==
- Morlaix Railway Station is served by TGV on the Paris–Brest railway. Immediately adjacent to the station is the Morlaix Viaduct, built in 1861–1863, and a national historic monument.
- Morlaix is served by the Morlaix Ploujean Airport.

== Breton language ==
The municipality launched a linguistic plan concerning the Breton language through Ya d'ar brezhoneg on 27 June 2008.

In 2008, 6.45% of primary-school children attended bilingual schools.

The Diwan school in Morlaix, founded around 1988, was originally located in very old apartments. In January 2008, the mayor offered the Diwan school a move to a more suitable location, an empty school. In June 2008, the new mayor decided that the Diwan school should move location once again. The town council wanted to use their building to open a new public school. However, the replacement building chosen for the Diwan school was in a very bad shape.

== Population ==
Inhabitants of Morlaix are called in French Morlaisiens.

Historical population

Year	Pop.	±% p.a.
1793	10,393	—
1800	9,351	−1.50%
1806	9,937	+1.02%
1821	9,781	−0.11%
1831	9,596	−0.19%
1836	9,740	+0.30%
1841	10,539	+1.59%
1846	11,529	+1.81%
1851	12,393	+1.46%
1856	12,904	+0.81%
1861	14,008	+1.66%
1866	14,046	+0.05%
1872	14,389	+0.40%
1876	15,183	+1.35%
1881	15,346	+0.21%
1886	16,013	+0.85%
1891	16,300	+0.36%
1896	16,027	−0.34%
1901	16,086	+0.07%

Year	Pop.	±% p.a.
1906	15,984	−0.13%
1911	15,262	−0.92%
1921	13,931	−0.91%
1926	13,959	+0.04%
1931	14,073	+0.16%
1936	13,944	−0.18%
1946	15,121	+0.81%
1954	15,037	−0.07%
1962	18,866	+2.88%
1968	19,919	+0.91%
1975	19,237	−0.50%
1982	18,348	−0.67%
1990	16,701	−1.17%
1999	15,990	−0.48%
2007	15,605	−0.30%
2012	15,507	−0.13%
2017	14,559	−1.25%
2023	15,194	+0.71%

Source: EHESS and INSEE (1968–2023)

== Economy ==
Brit Air, a regional airline and Air France subsidiary, is at Morlaix Airport in Morlaix. In 2013 the airline merged with HOP!

== Education ==
Morlaix has six public primary schools, four private primary schools, three public junior high schools, two public senior high schools/sixth-form colleges, two private junior high schools, and one public senior high/sixth-form.

Public schools:

- Preschools and elementary schools: Corentin-Caer, Emlie-Cloarec, Gambetta (separate preschool and elementary schools), Jean-Jaures (separate preschool and elementary schools), Jean-Piaget, and Poan Ben (separate preschool and elementary schools)
- Junior high schools: Collège du Château, College Mendes-France, College Tanguy-Prient
- Senior high schools: Lycée Agricole de Suscinio and Lycée Tristan-Corbière

Private schools:

- Preschools and elementary schools: Diwan, Notre Dame de Loures, Notre Dame de Ploujean, and Saint-Joseph
- Junior high schools: College Saint-Augustin, College Saint-Joseph
- Senior high school: Ensemble Scolaire Le Porsmeur – Notre Dame du Mur

== Climate ==
Morlaix has an oceanic climate (Köppen climate classification Cfb). The average annual temperature in Morlaix is 11.4 °C (52.5 °F). The average annual rainfall is 976.3 mm (38.44 in) with December as the wettest month. The temperatures are highest on average in August, at around 17.0 °C (62.6 °F), and lowest in January, at around 6.7 °C (44.1 °F). The highest temperature ever recorded in Morlaix was 36.6 °C (97.9 °F) on 18 July 2006; the coldest temperature ever recorded was −9.5 °C (14.9 °F) on 19 February 1985.

Climate data for Morlaix (1981–2010 averages, extremes 1977−2013)
Month	Jan	Feb	Mar	Apr	May	Jun	Jul	Aug	Sep	Oct	Nov	Dec	Year
Record high °C (°F)	16.5 (61.7)	19.6 (67.3)	25.0 (77.0)	27.2 (81.0)	29.5 (85.1)	33.4 (92.1)	36.6 (97.9)	36.5 (97.7)	31.2 (88.2)	30.4 (86.7)	21.4 (70.5)	18.5 (65.3)	36.6 (97.9)
Mean daily maximum °C (°F)	9.6 (49.3)	10.0 (50.0)	12.2 (54.0)	13.9 (57.0)	17.1 (62.8)	19.6 (67.3)	21.5 (70.7)	21.7 (71.1)	19.9 (67.8)	16.4 (61.5)	12.6 (54.7)	10.2 (50.4)	15.4 (59.7)
Daily mean °C (°F)	6.7 (44.1)	6.7 (44.1)	8.4 (47.1)	9.5 (49.1)	12.5 (54.5)	15.0 (59.0)	17.0 (62.6)	17.0 (62.6)	15.2 (59.4)	12.6 (54.7)	9.2 (48.6)	7.1 (44.8)	11.4 (52.5)
Mean daily minimum °C (°F)	3.8 (38.8)	3.4 (38.1)	4.6 (40.3)	5.1 (41.2)	8.0 (46.4)	10.5 (50.9)	12.5 (54.5)	12.4 (54.3)	10.5 (50.9)	8.7 (47.7)	5.9 (42.6)	4.0 (39.2)	7.5 (45.5)
Record low °C (°F)	−9.2 (15.4)	−9.5 (14.9)	−5.3 (22.5)	−3.8 (25.2)	−1.3 (29.7)	2.2 (36.0)	4.5 (40.1)	3.1 (37.6)	0.2 (32.4)	−4.6 (23.7)	−6.0 (21.2)	−7.6 (18.3)	−9.5 (14.9)
Average precipitation mm (inches)	112.2 (4.42)	87.4 (3.44)	77.6 (3.06)	75.6 (2.98)	69.7 (2.74)	50.0 (1.97)	52.0 (2.05)	51.1 (2.01)	66.5 (2.62)	102.3 (4.03)	108.3 (4.26)	123.6 (4.87)	976.3 (38.44)
Average precipitation days (≥ 1.0 mm)	17.0	13.6	13.6	13.0	11.1	8.5	9.0	9.4	9.7	14.8	16.8	16.8	153.2
Source: Meteociel

== Personalities ==
born in the 15th century

- Jean Coatanlem (circa 1455–1492), corsair and admiral of Portugal.
- Nicolas Coetanlem (1460–1519), merchant and sailor, nephew of the former.

born in the 16th century

- Albert Le Grand (1599-1641), hagiographer

born in the 18th century

- Lannux de la Chaume family, merchants, shipowners, financiers, mayor of Morlaix, consulates of Spain in France before the Revolution.
- Nicolas Anthon (1714–v.1753), corsair of the port of Morlaix born in Roscoff, captain of the Comtesse de La Marck and the Comte de Saint Pern.
- Charles Cornic (1731–1809), corsair.
- Michel Behic (1736–1827), merchant, financier, revolutionary, mayor of Morlaix.
- Joseph Gueguen (1741–1825), domestic, secretary, interpreter, translator, merchant and justice, born in Morlaix, died in Cocagne (New-Brunswick).
- Armand Joseph Dubernad (1743–1799), merchant, financier, revolutionary.
- Louis-Alexandre Expilly de la Poipe (1743–1794), French first constitutional bishop, bishop of Cornwall, guillotined on 22 May 1794 in Brest with 26 administrators of Finistère.
- Jean Nicolas Anthon (1747–1790), privateer corsair, captain of the Count of Guichen (1781, shipowner Jean Diot), captured by the English, imprisoned in Falmouth, escaped, resumed activity as captain of the Éclipse based in Dunkirk and in the merchant navy.
- Jean Augustin Masson (1749–1808), general of the armies of the Republic and the Empire, who died in this city.
- Yves-Joseph Le Denmat de Kervern (1751–1794), a lawyer in the Parlement of Rennes, mayor of Morlaix in 1790, guillotined on 22 May 1794 in Brest with 26 directors of Finistère.
- Jean Victor Marie Moreau (1763–1813), born in Morlaix, General of the Revolution, winner of Hohenlinden, Field Marshal of Russia posthumously, marshall of France posthumously.
- Joseph Marie Moreau (1764–1849), born and died in Morlaix, brother of the general, lawyer, tribun, deputy head of the Post, député for Ille-et-Vilaine.
- Charles Yves César Cyr du Coëtlosquet (1783-1837), general of the armies of the Republic and the Empire.
- Luc Urbain de Bouëxic, comte de Guichen (1790), admiral.
- Édouard Corbière (1793–1875), sailor, writer, journalist and shipowner.
- Joseph Coat (1798–1858), born in Saint-Mathieu (Morlaix) and died in Morlaix; worker and author of a large amount of original Breton tragedies. Founded in Morlaix a troupe of folk theater, father of the poet-worker Vincent Coat (1845-1908), born in Morlaix.
- Auguste Barchou de Penhoën, (1799–1855), born in Morlaix, Staff Captain, man of letters, deputy of Finistère.
- Jean-Louis Le Loutre (1709-1772), Catholic priest and leader of Acadians during Father Le Loutre's War and the Acadian Exodus.

born in the 19th century

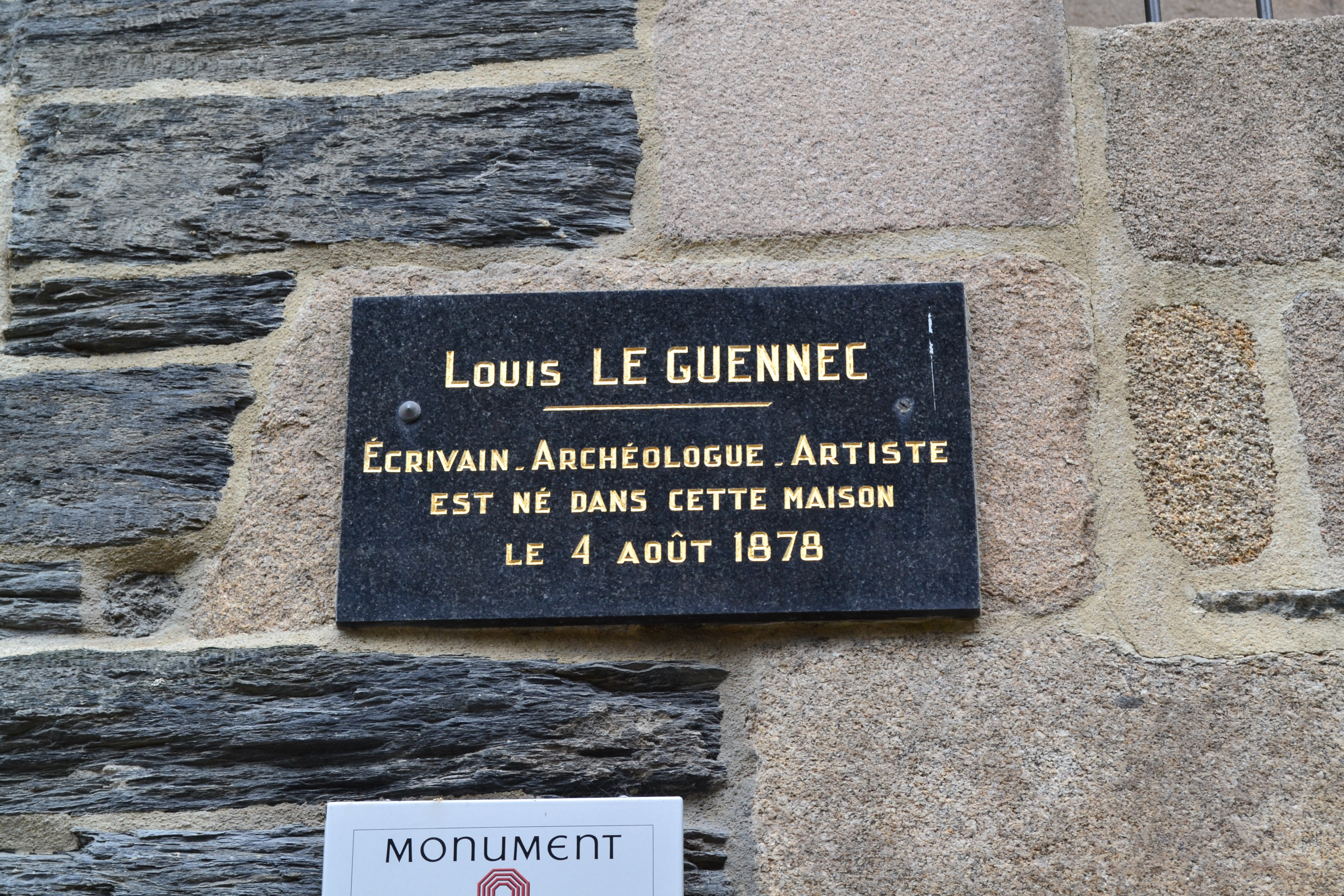
Louis Le Guennec was born in the Hôtel called François du Parc.

- Émile Souvestre (1806–1854), writer born in Morlaix, Prix de l'Académie française in 1854.
- Arthur-Marie Le Hir (1811–1868), born in Morlaix, theologian and Hebraist, Ernest Renan's master.
- Marie Bracquemond, impressionist artist (1840–1916).
- Tristan Corbière (1845–1875), poet, Édouard Corbière's son. His bust, by Cyril de La Patellière is in the Bibliothèque des Amours Jaunes.
- Vincent Coat (1845–1908), born in Morlaix. Breton poet and worker at the Tobacco Factory, son of Joseph Coat (1798-1858), born and died in Morlaix, author of many tragedies and worker.
- Gabriel Pierné (1863–1937), composer and organ player.
- Paul Sérusier (1864–1927), post-impressionist painter and Nabi.
- Joseph Pleyber (1866-1947), architect.
- Maxime Weygand (1867–1965), general, had a manor in Morlaix and is buried at St. Charles Cemetery.
- Jules Boucherit (1877–1962), violinist, born in Morlaix, professor at the Paris Conservatory, named "Just" by the State of Israel for harboring his students between 1941 and 1944.
- Guillaume Seznec (1878–1954), lived in Morlaix, Lurs sawmill master.
- Magdeleine Boucherit Le Faure (1879–1960), his sister, pianist and composer.
- Louis Le Guennec (1878–1935), writer and artist.
- Nina Ricci (1882–1970), couturière from Italy
- Francis Gourvil (1889–1984), writer and resistant.
- Léon Le Janne, (1894–1976), MD, resistant ("Commandant Noël"), auxiliary doctor in the 2nd Colonial Infantry Regiment in 1914–1918, commander of the secret army Libé Nord Morlaix and its region during World War II.
- Jean Marie Colcanap (1896) Born in Morlaix. Officer French Colonial Army. Distinguished career in Madagascar. Amateur naturalist who made significant geological and paleontological discoveries. Source: Archives of Societe Historique de la Defense, Chateau Vincennes, Paris.

born in the 20th century

- Jean Nicolas, (1901–1984), born in Morlaix, Catholic priest and missionary in the Soviet Union.
- Henri Rol-Tanguy (1908–2002), communist resistant, colonel commanding the FFI during the Liberation of Paris.
- Joseph Kerharo (1909–1986), pharmacologist and botanist, born in Morlaix.
- Michel Mohrt (1914–2011), writer, born in Morlaix, Grand prix du roman de l'Académie française in 1962 and member of the Académie française from 1985 to his death.
- Pierre Le Gourierec (1920–1942), born in Morlaix, KIA in Bir Hakeim, Compagnon de la Libération.
- Julien Guiomar (1928–2010), actor born in Morlaix, died in Monpazier (Dordogne).
- Jean Roudaut (1929–), writer born in Morlaix.
- Paco Rabanne (1934–), stylist, spent part of his childhood in Morlaix.
- Jean-Loup Chrétien (1938–), astronaut.
- Brigitte Fontaine (1939–) singer, author, writer, poet and actress.
- Dominique Lavanant (1944–), actress, born in Morlaix.
- Patrick Le Roux (1943–), historian
- Jean-Michel Caradec (1946–1981), singer-songwriter.
- Marylise Lebranchu (1947–) woman politician born in Loudéac (22), mayor of Morlaix (1995–1997), président of Morlaix Communauté (1995–2003), secrétaire d'État (1997–2000), Justice Ministry (2000–2002), vice-présidente de la région Bretagne (2004-2010), MP (1997-), ministre de la Réforme de l'État, de la Décentralisation et de la Fonction Publique (2012-).
- Gérard Delahaye (1948–), singer-songwriter and singer for children.
- Miou-Miou (1950–), actress, her grandparents lived in Plouénan.
- Erril Laugier (1952–2014), pastel impressionist painter, Maître-Pastelliste de France and Ambassadeur Canson, lived in Morlaix from 1978 to 1986, and died there 6 December 2014.
- Jean-Philippe Quignon (1961–2012), journalist at Télégramme local newspaper and vice president of the festival des Vieilles Charrues in Carhaix-Plouguer.
- Agnès Le Brun (1961–), woman politician mayor of Morlaix since 2008 and MEP since 2011.
- El Globos (1964–), French designer, creator of the brand À l'Aise Breizh.
- Françoise Jézéquel (1970–), football player
- Éric Digaire (1972–), musician, member of Matmatah.
- Clarisse Lavanant (1979–), singer-songwriter.
- Renan Luce (1980–), singer-songwriter, youth spent in Quelern, in Plourin-lès-Morlaix.
- Énora Malagré (1980–), TV and radio host.
- Tepr (1980–), author of electronic music.

== Twin towns – sister cities ==
Morlaix is twinned with:

- Truro, England, United Kingdom (1979)
- Würselen, Germany (1976)

In addition, Morlaix cooperates with Réo, Burkina Faso.

== Gallery ==
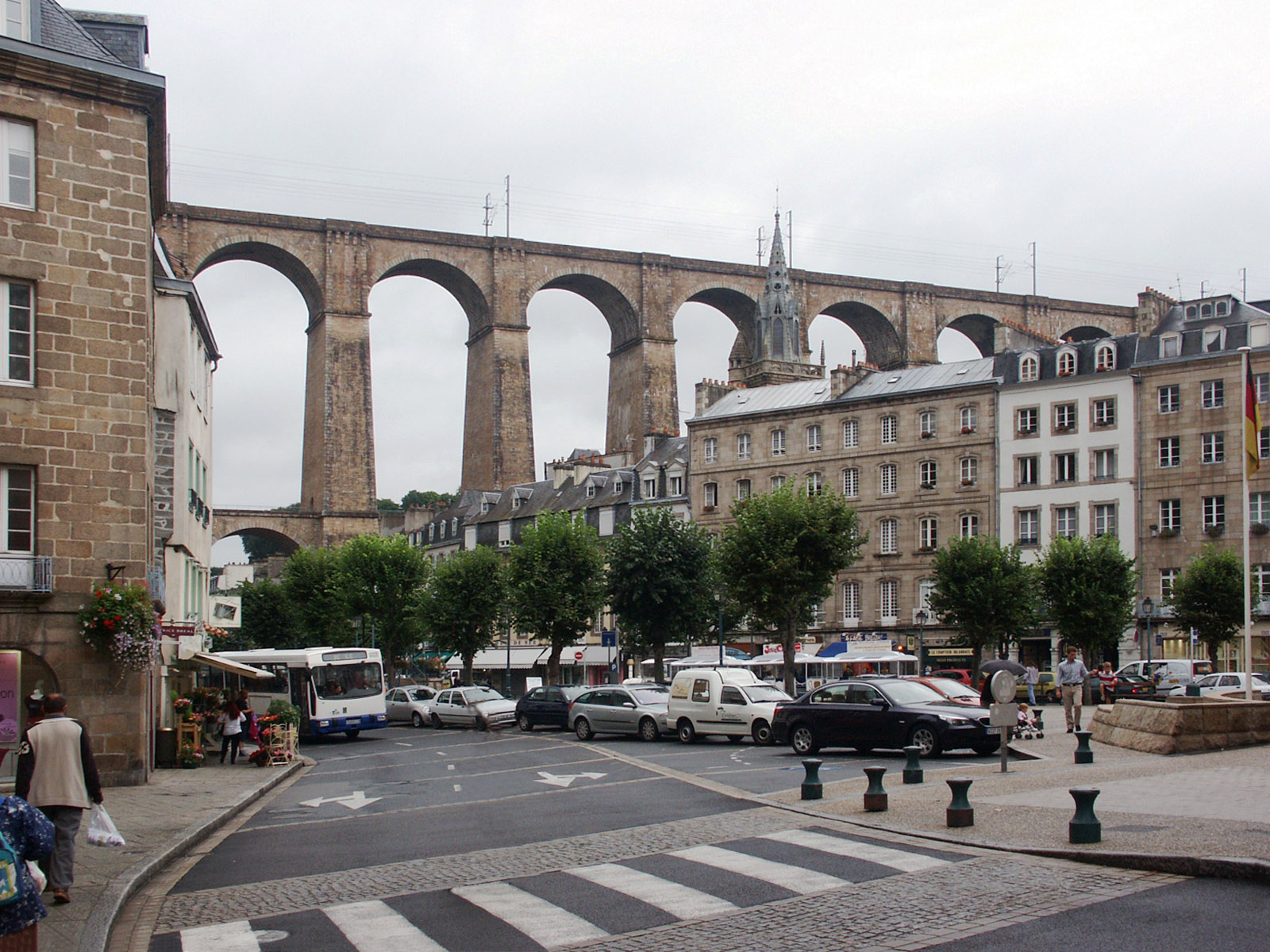
Morlaix viaduct

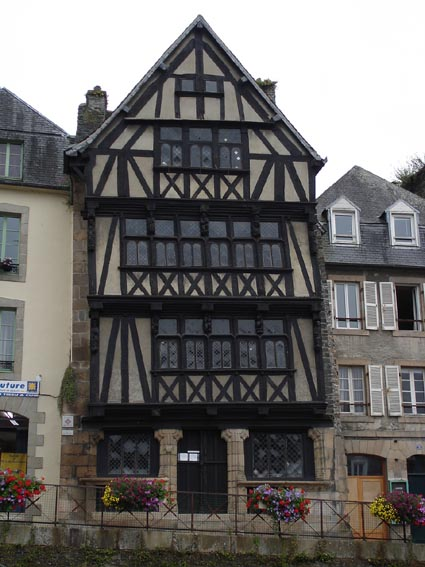
House known as Duchess Anne's House

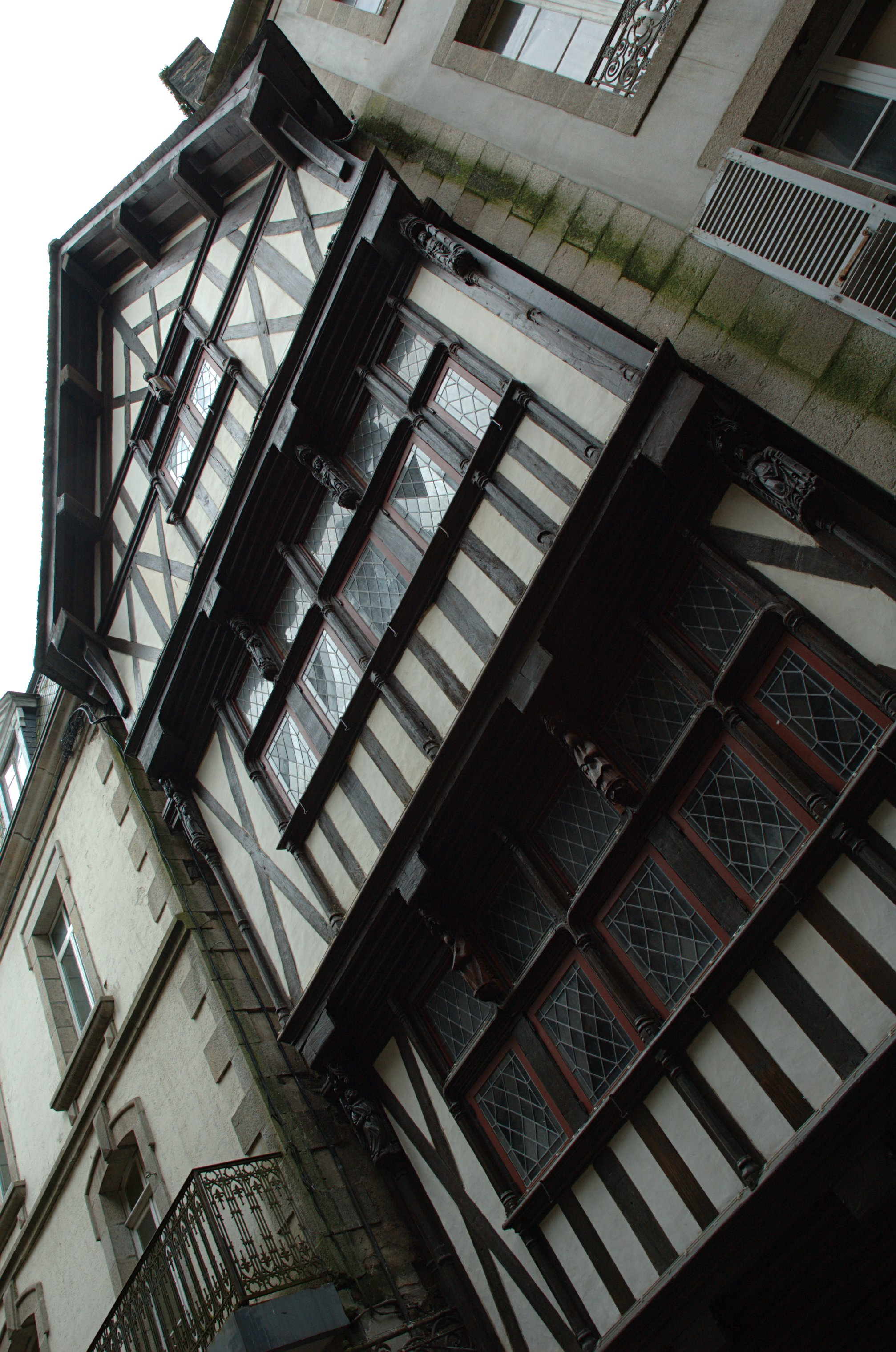
Pondalez house museum

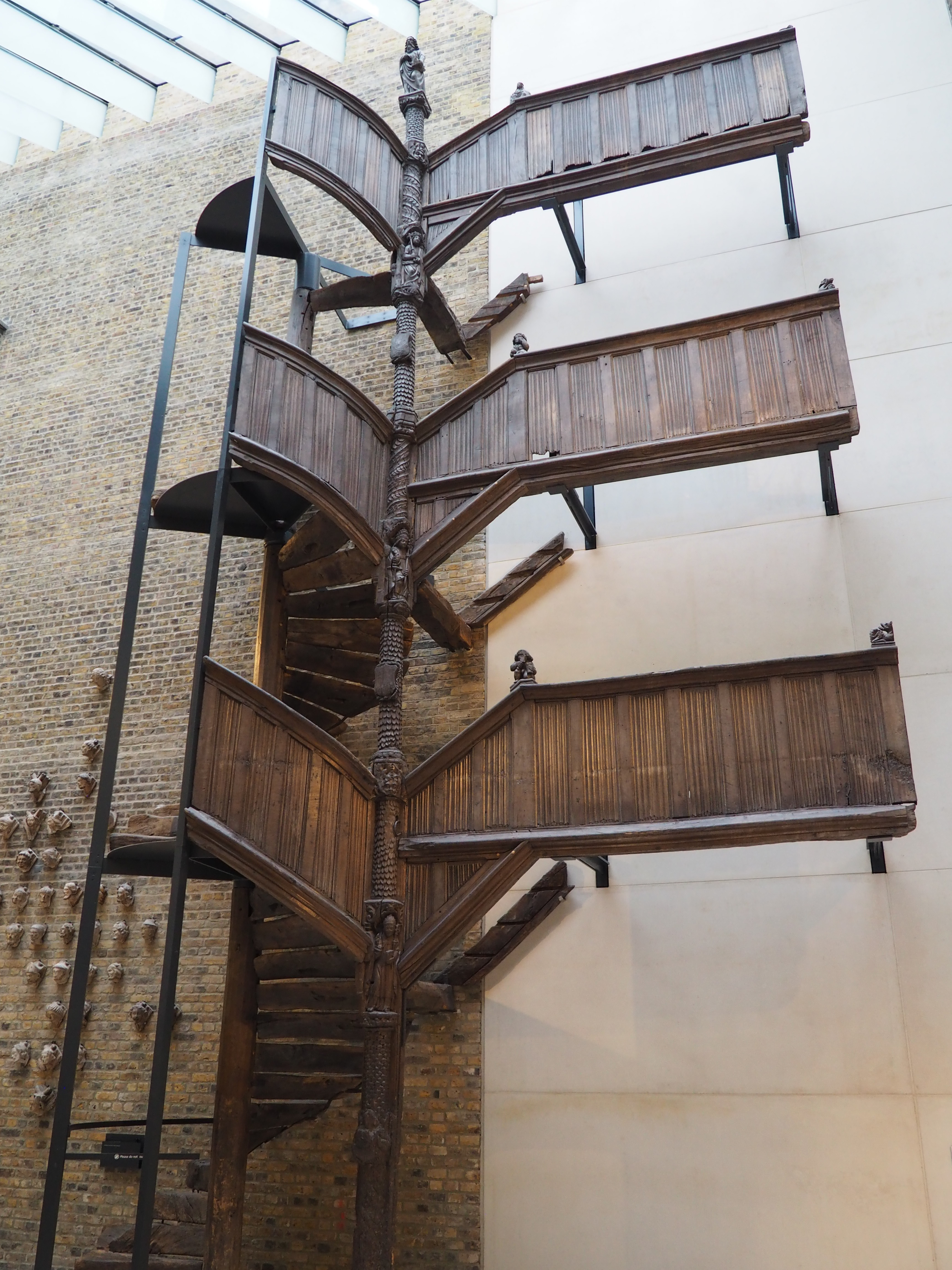
16th century wooden staircase from Morlaix, Daylit Gallery, V&A

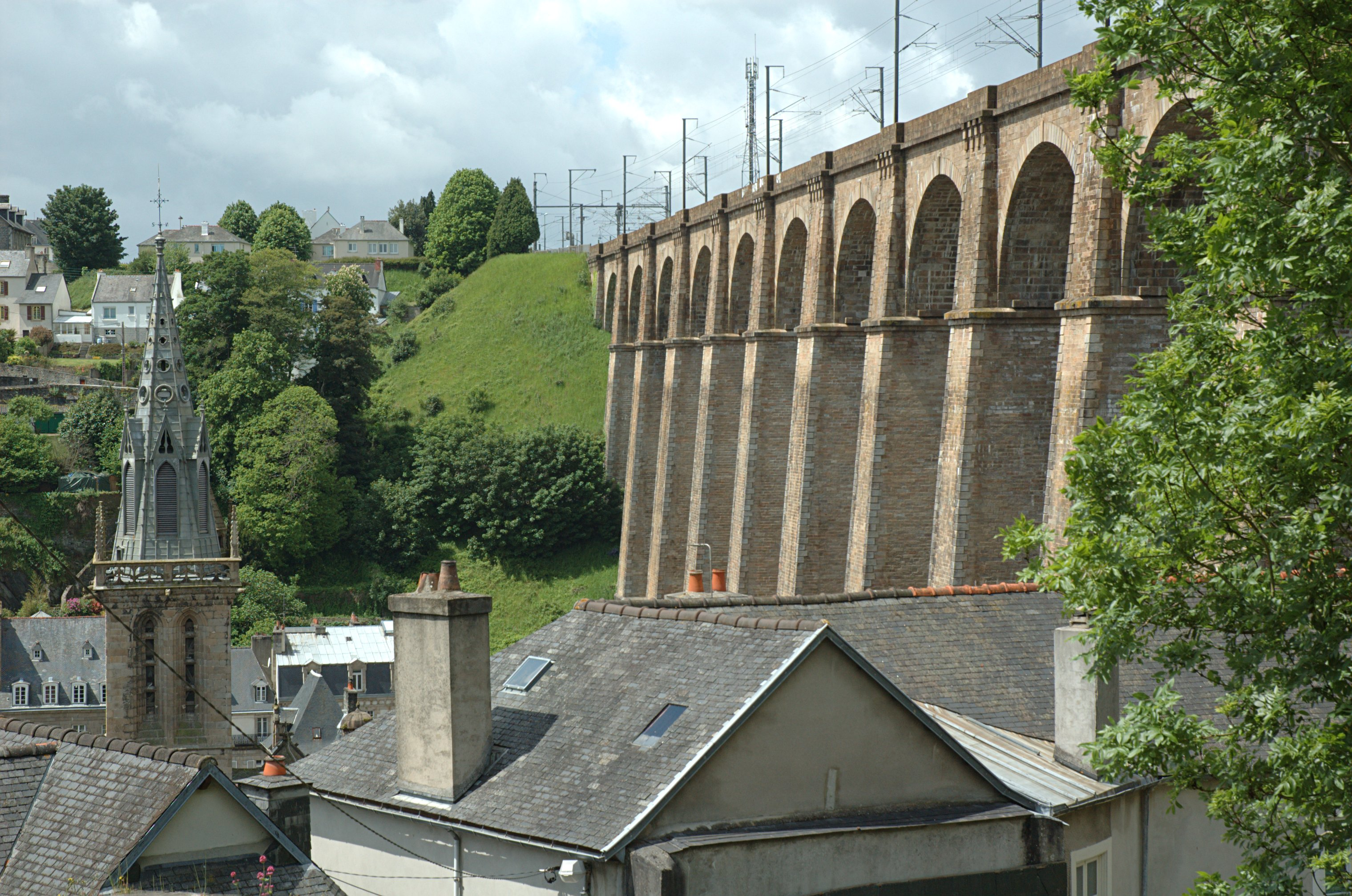
Hillside view of the viaduct

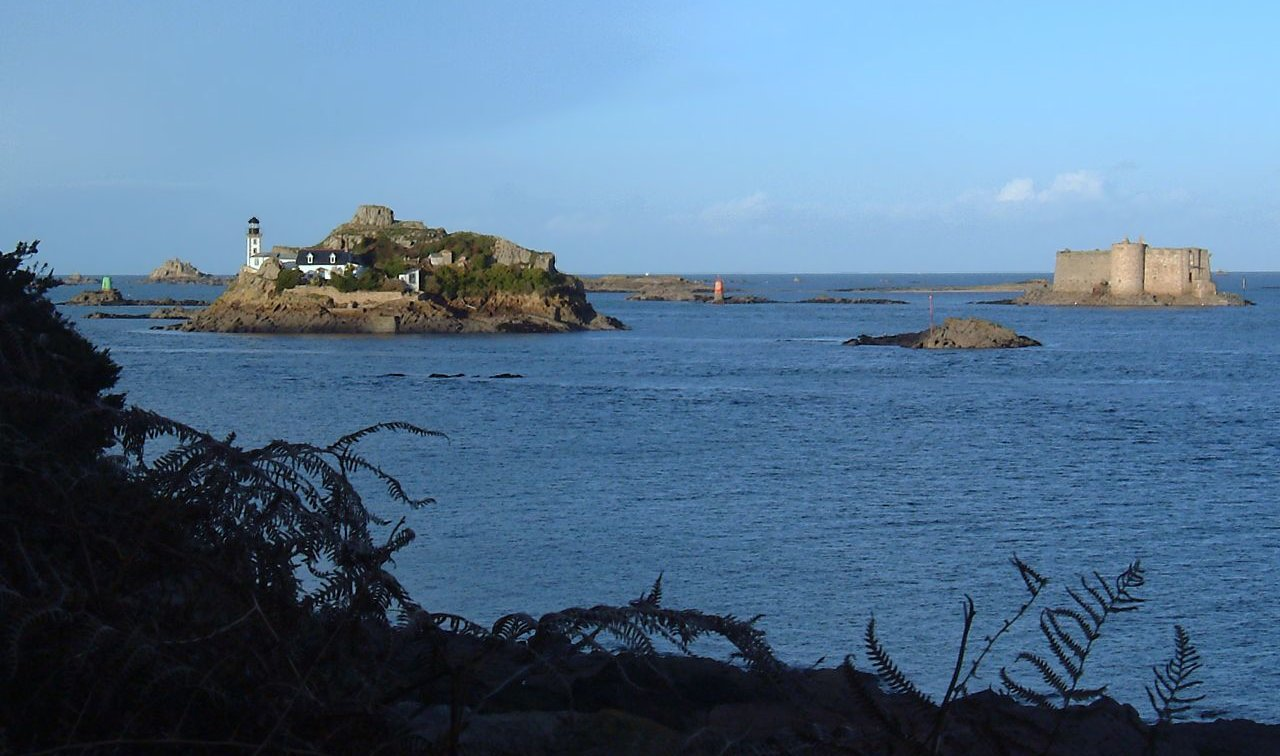
Bay of Morlaix with the Château du Taureau

== See also ==
- Communes of the Finistère department
- Yann Larhantec, Sculptor of Calvaries who lived in Morlaix
- List of the works of the Maître de Plougastel
