= Plougonven Parish close =

Coordinates: 48.5217°N 3.7122°W

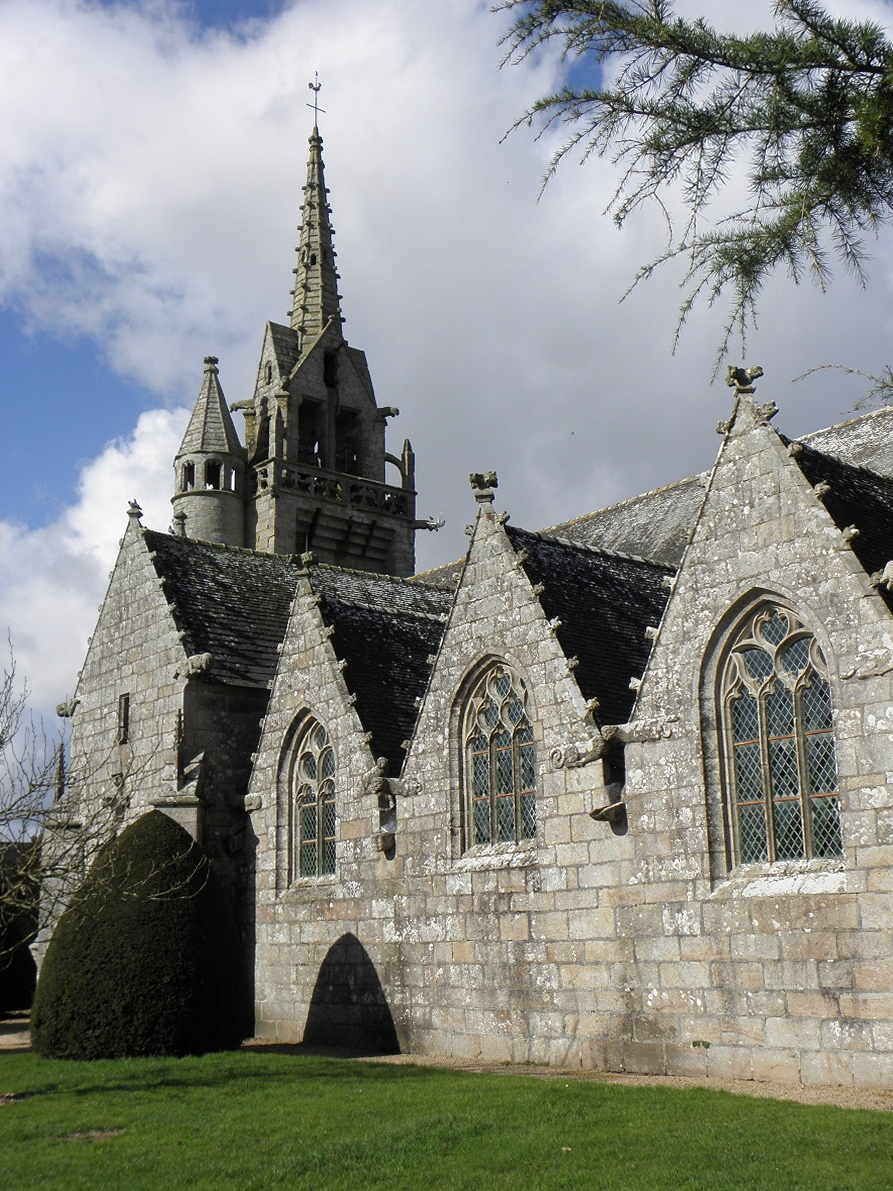
The Saint Yves church at Plougonven

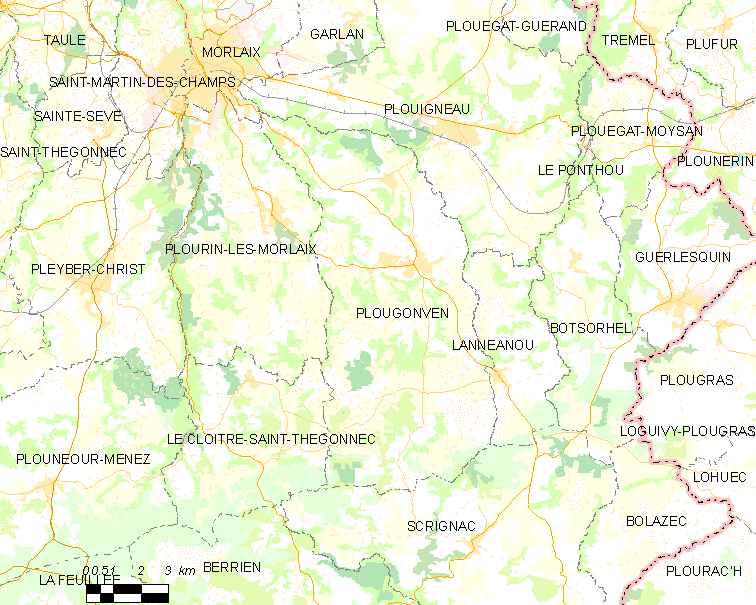
Map showing the location of Plougonven

The Plougonven Parish close (Enclos paroissial) is located at Plougonven in the arrondissement of Morlaix in Finistère in Brittany in north-western France. The parish close comprises the church, an ossuary, the enclosure wall and the Calvary at Plougonven. It is a listed historical monument since 1916.

== The church ==
The church in the Plougonven parish close was built between 1507 and 1523 by Philippe Beaumanoir and dedicated to Saint Yves. The chevet was modified in 1702. On the night of 1 May 1930, the church was badly damaged by fire and only the walls and the bell tower survived. In 1933. the church was restored. It was listed on 19 December 1913.

== Statues ==
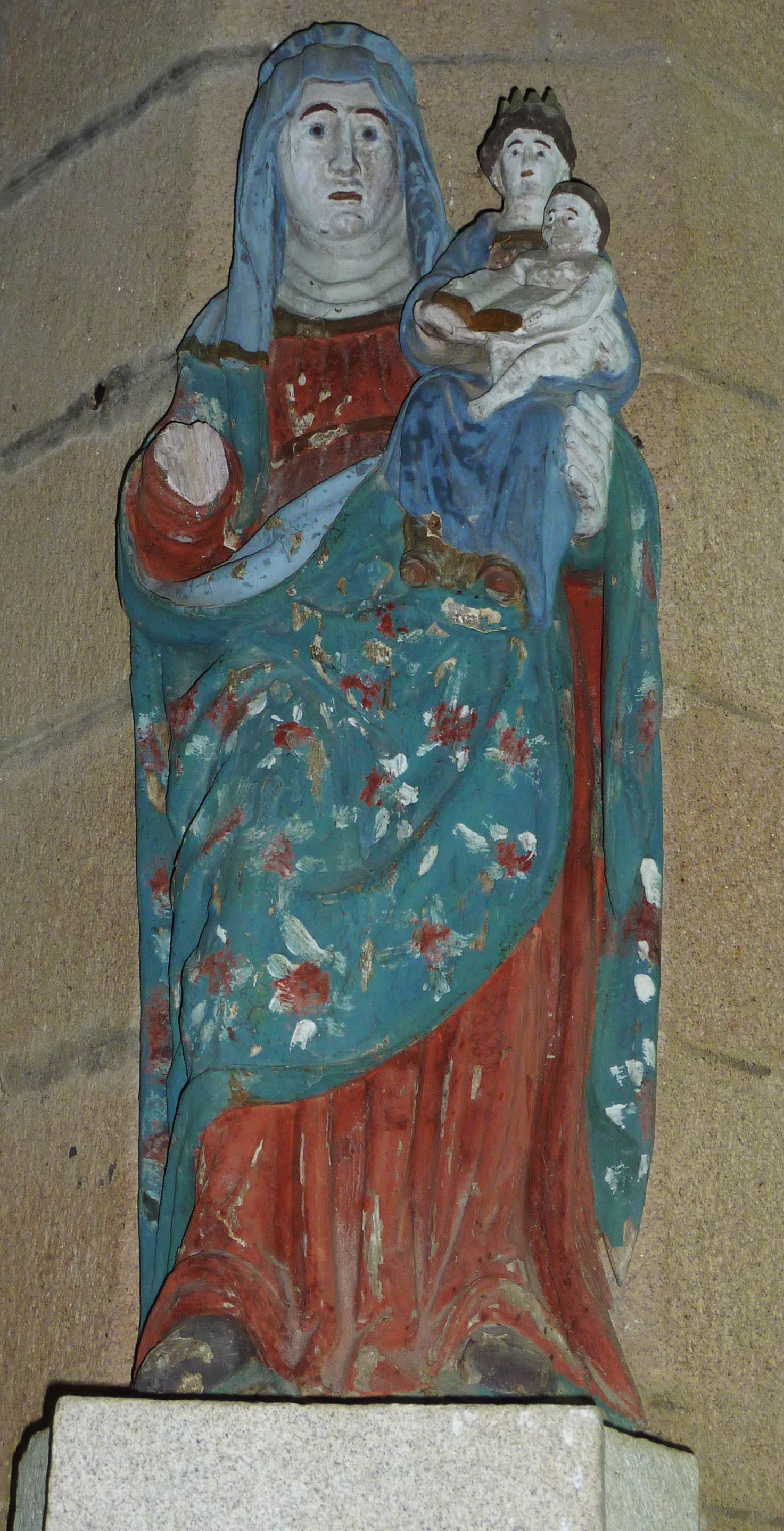
Statue of Saint Anne

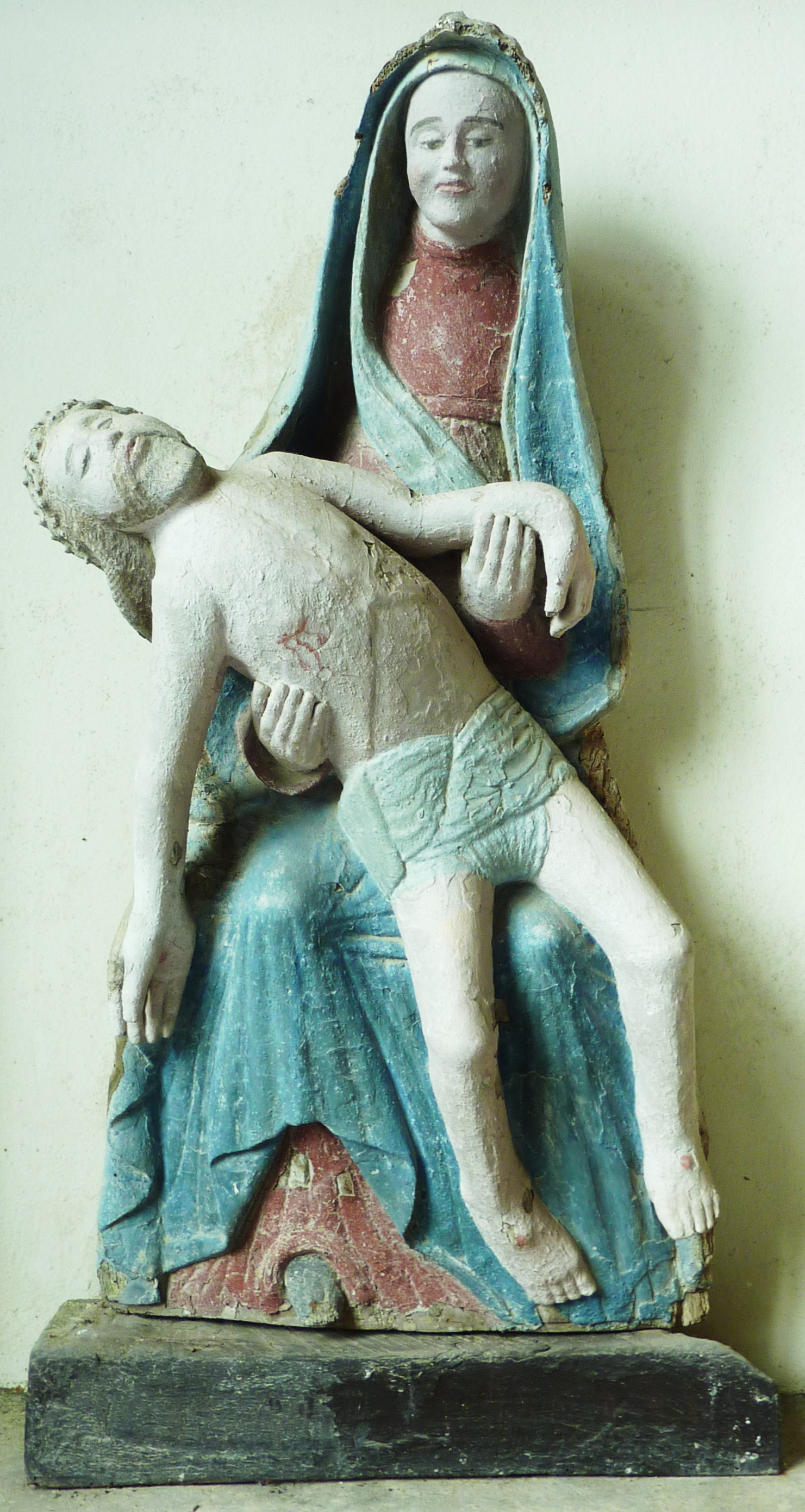
Pietà

The church contains several old statues. On the north side of the church there is a pietà and statues of Saint Barbara, Saint Joseph and John the Baptist and on the south side statues of Saint Yves and Francis of Assisi as well as a study of a seated Saint Anne carrying the Virgin Mary who in turn carries the baby Jesus.

== The altars ==
There are several altars in the church's side chapels. These are carved from Kersanton stone and were the work of Yann Larhantec and placed in the church in the years between 1855 and 1874.

== Processional banner ==
This is on display in the choir area and dates to the 17th century. It is dedicated to Saint Sacrement and the Virgin Mary. It was restored in 2006.

== The ossuary ==
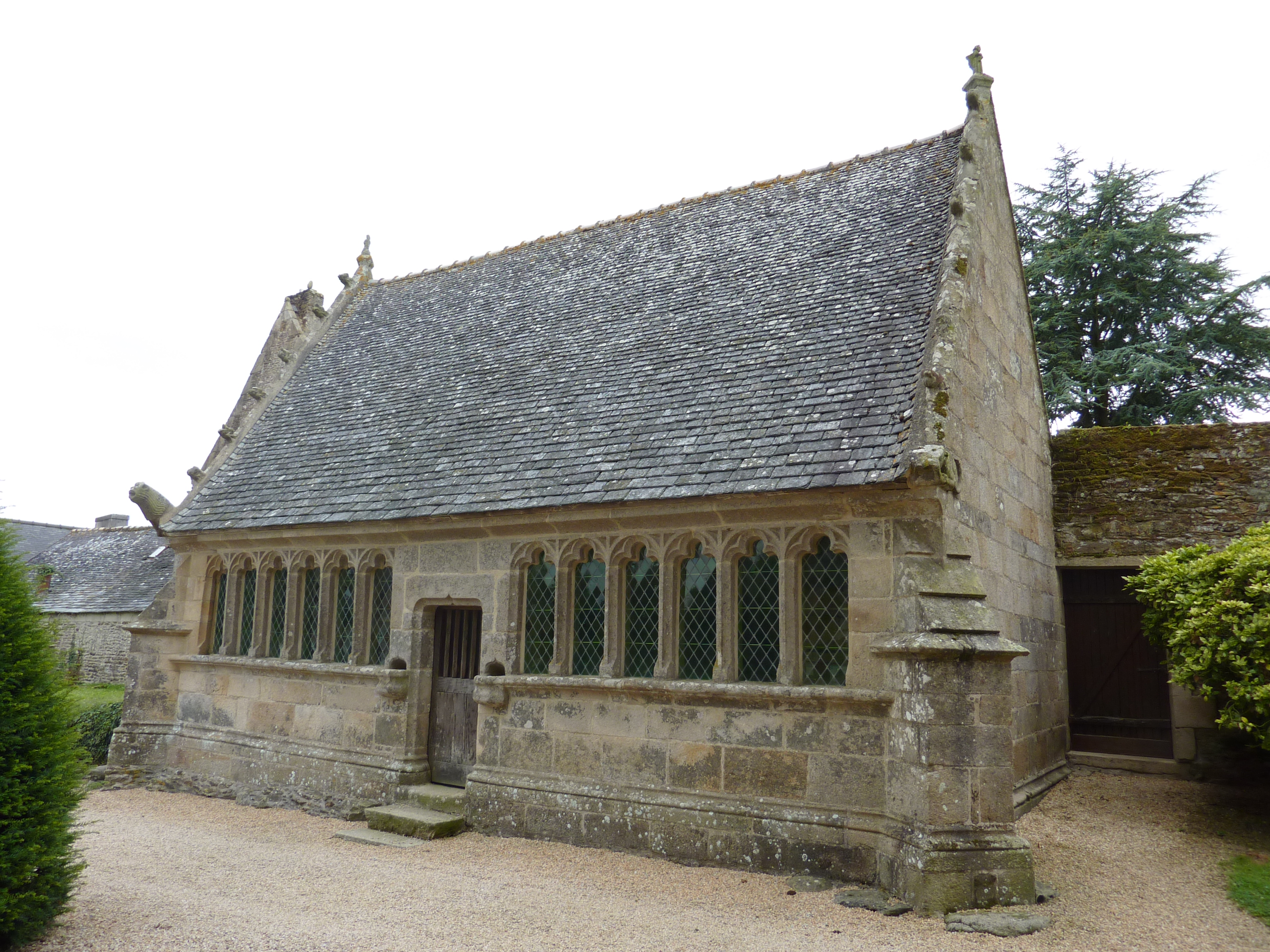
The ossuary at Plougonven

The building has arcaded windows,"trilobées" and dates to the beginning of the 16th century. The relics and bones held in the building were removed in 1884. At that time it was recorded that over 400 skulls were moved, many in "skull boxes" which recorded the deceased's name, age and date of death.

== The chapel of Christ ==
This dates to 1432 and was rebuilt in 1745/1746. Many of the statues held in the chapel were moved to the church.

== Stained glass window ==
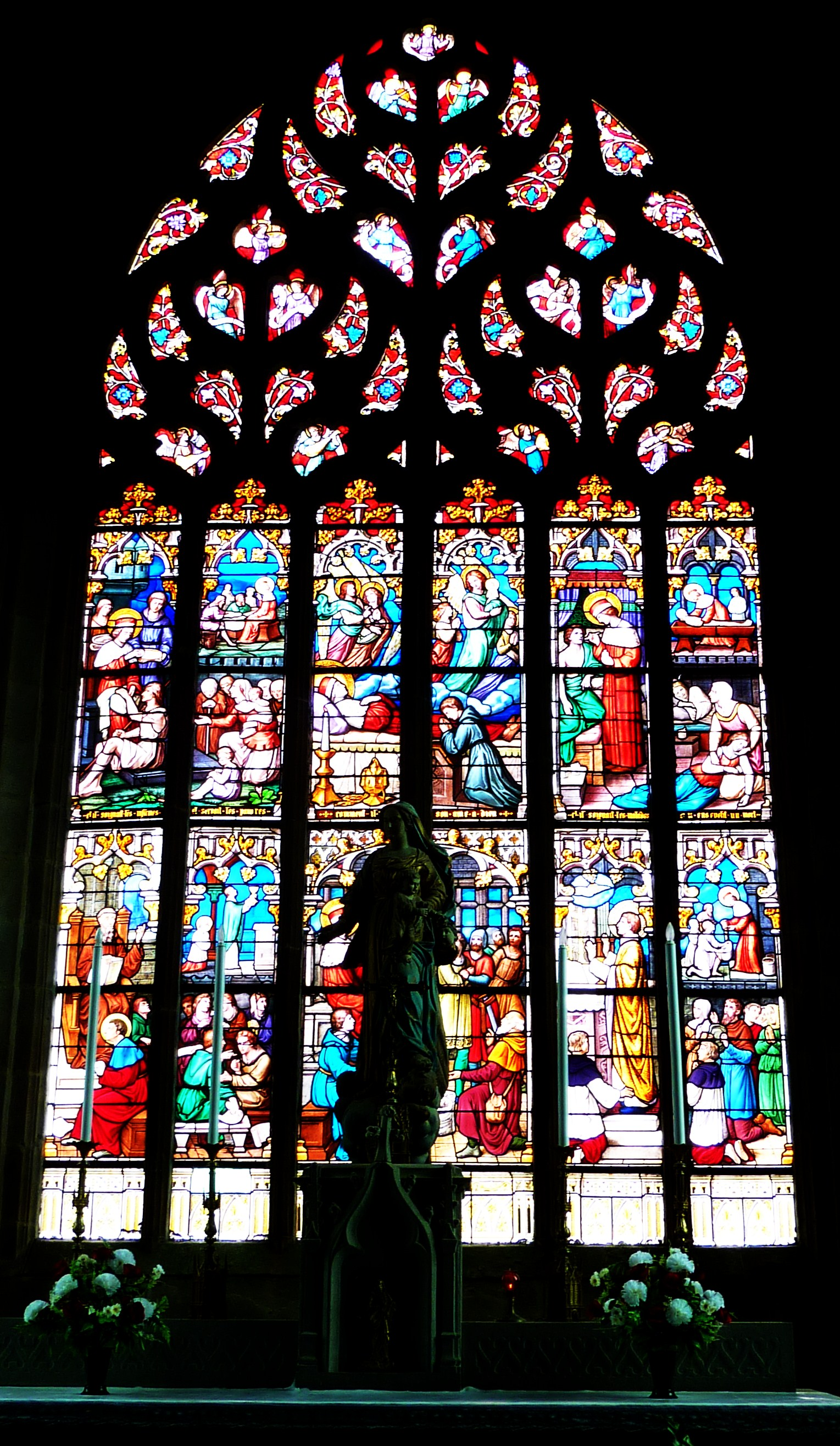
Stained glass window behind main altar

The great window behind the main altar retraces episodes from the life of Saint-Yves and is an exact copy of the original erected in 1702.

== The chapels ==
The first chapel to the left of the choir was dedicated in 1679 to the Virgin Mary and Saint Joseph. The patrons were the manoir de Kerloaguen. In the second chapel, dedicated in 1679 to Sainte-Marguerite and Saint-Gildas, is the altar of Saint-Vincent de Paul the work of Yann Larhantec and in the keystone of the arcade corresponding to this chapel is a shield bearing the coat of arms of the Goudelins, "seigneurs" of Kerloaguen. The third chapel is dedicated to Saint-Yves and the corresponding arcade keystone holds the blason of Salaün de Lesven. The fourth chapel and the last in the left wing of the church was dedicated in 1679 to "Notre-Dame de Pitié". The arcade keystone here has the coat of arms of Le Lagadec. In recesses in the church walls many of the Plougonven nobility are buried. In the right side aisle is a chapel dedicated to Saint-Roch, Saint-Laurent and Saint-David and the coat of arms of the Keraudrens can be seen in the neighbouring arcade. There is also a chapel of the rosary. The other chapel was dedicated in 1679 to John the Baptist now dedicated to Sainte-Anne. This chapel holds the shield of the Goudelins.

== The tomb of Abbé Le Teurnier ==
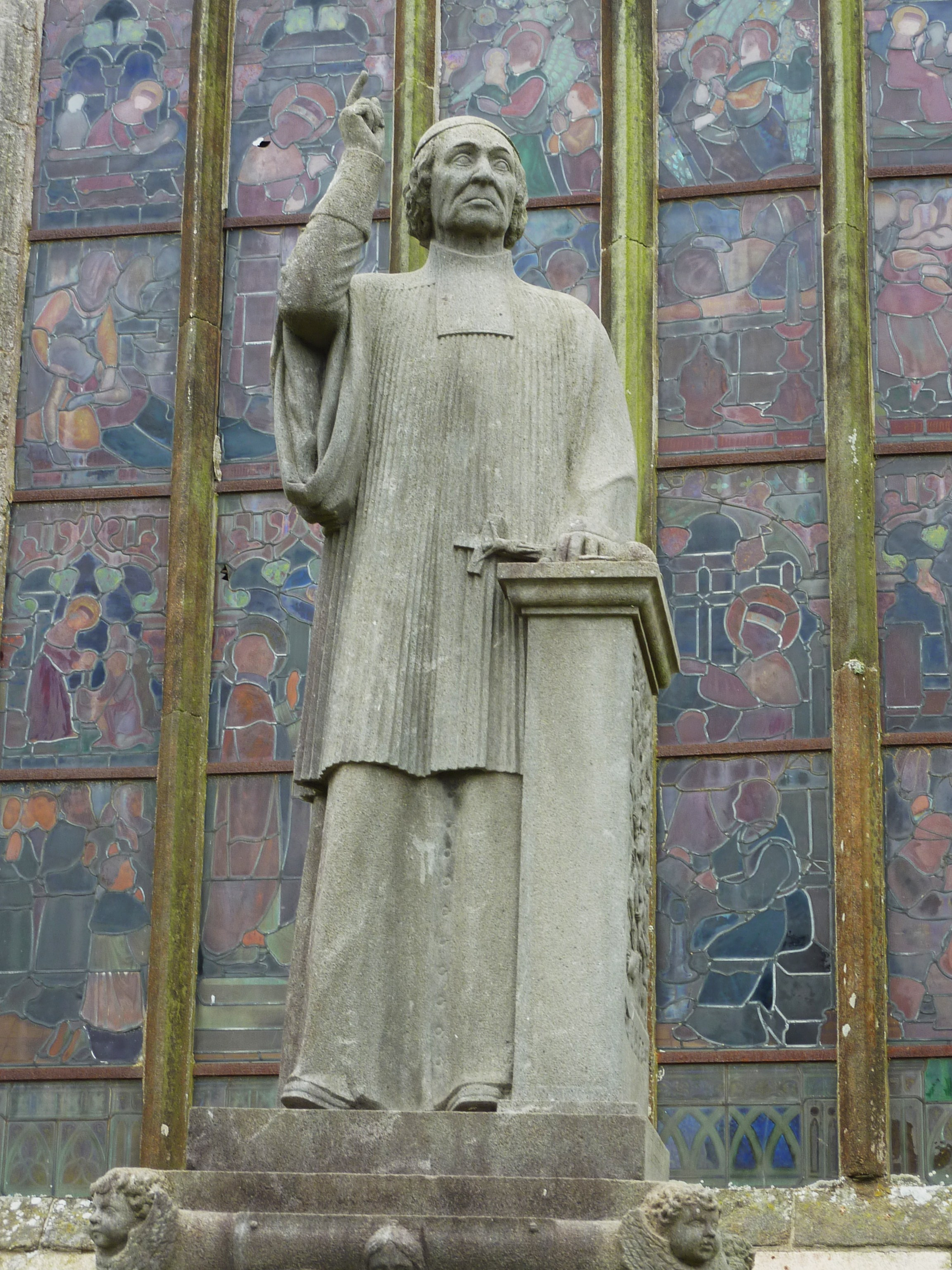
Yann Larhantec's sculpture of Bernard François Marie Le Teurnier

This is located by the small south east door. This famous priest had been born in Guervenan in Plougonven in 1783 and died there in 1883. The statue adorning the tomb is the work of Yann Larhantec. The statue depicts Le Teurnier giving a speech and standing by a chair with bas-relief carvings of the "taolennou". The taolennou was a painted teaching device famously used by Michel Le Nobletz.

== Gallery of images ==
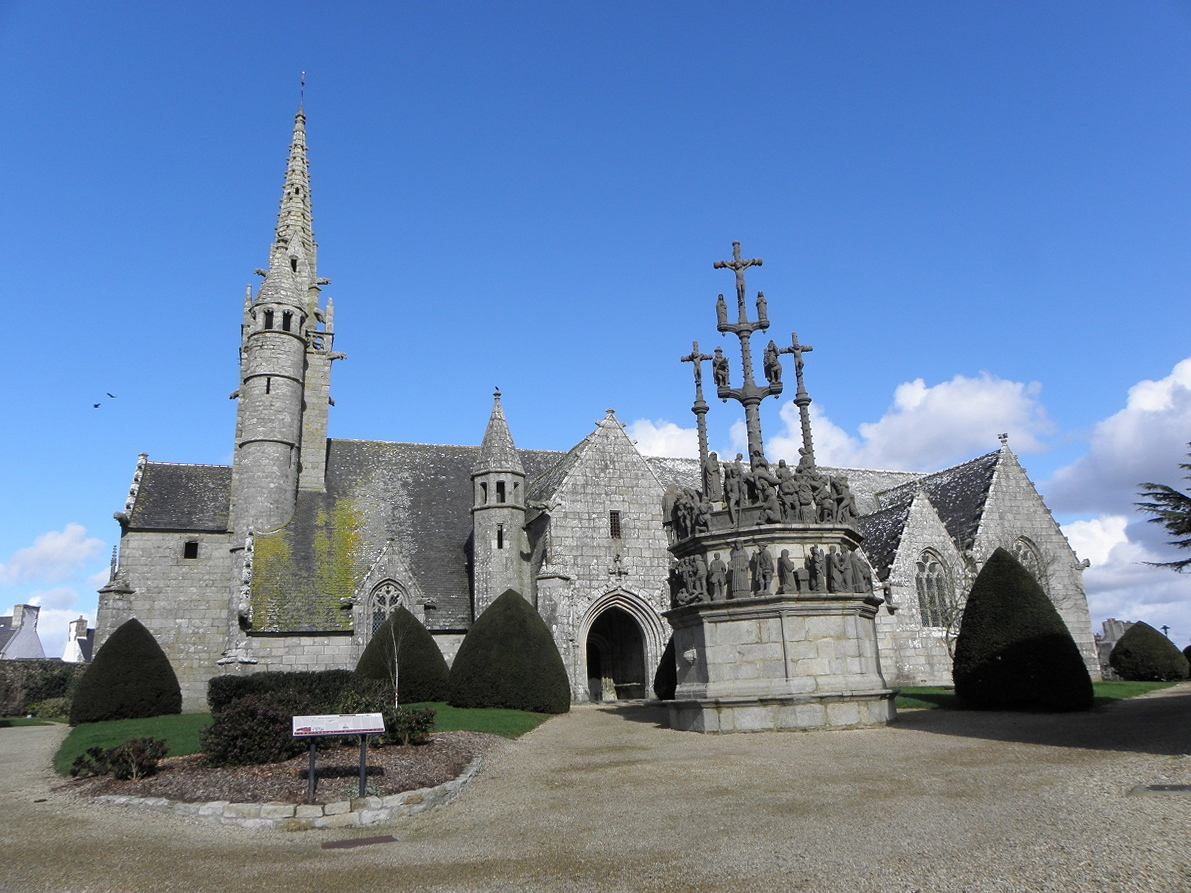
View of church and calvary

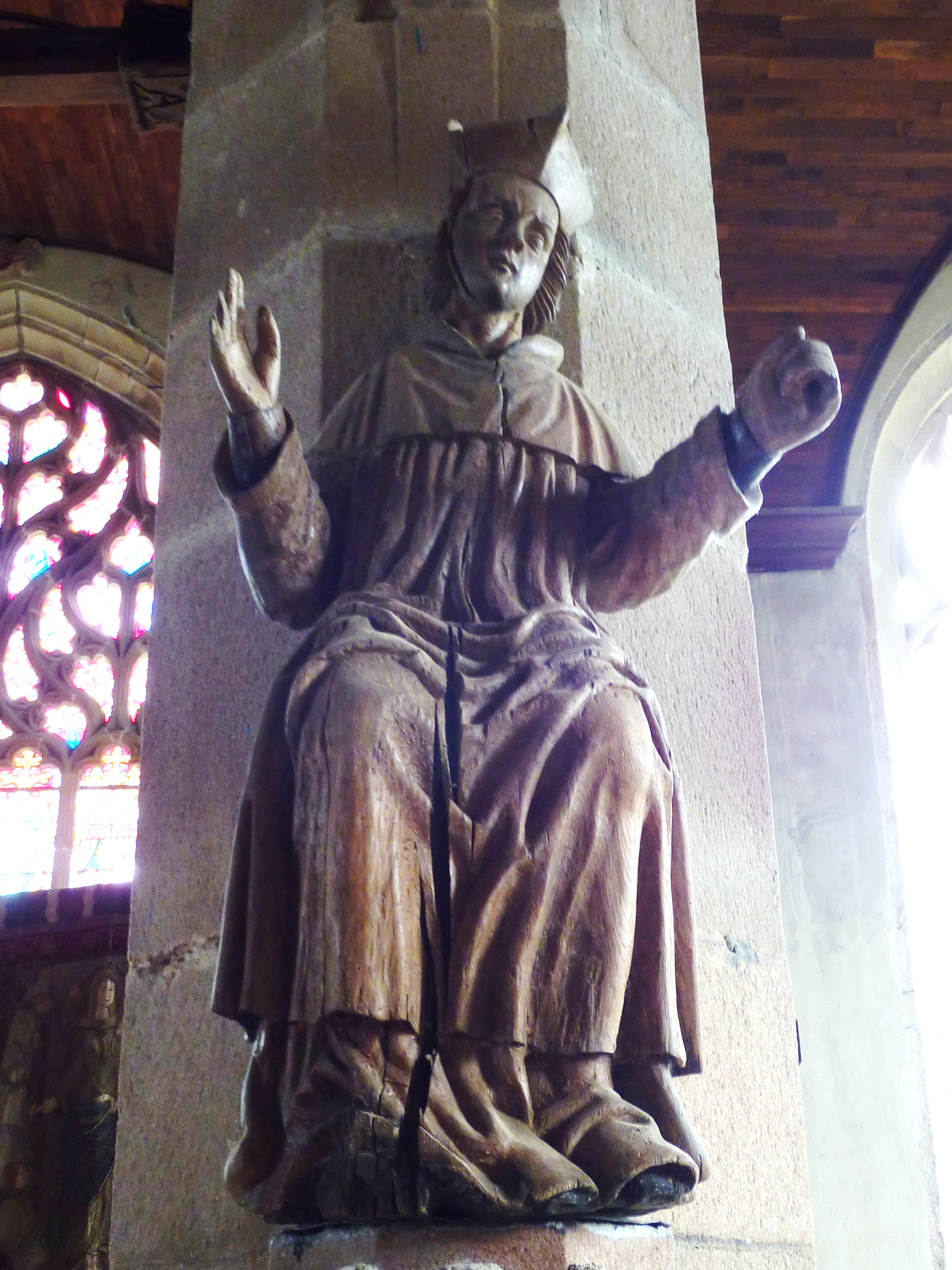
Statue of Saint Yves in Plougonven church

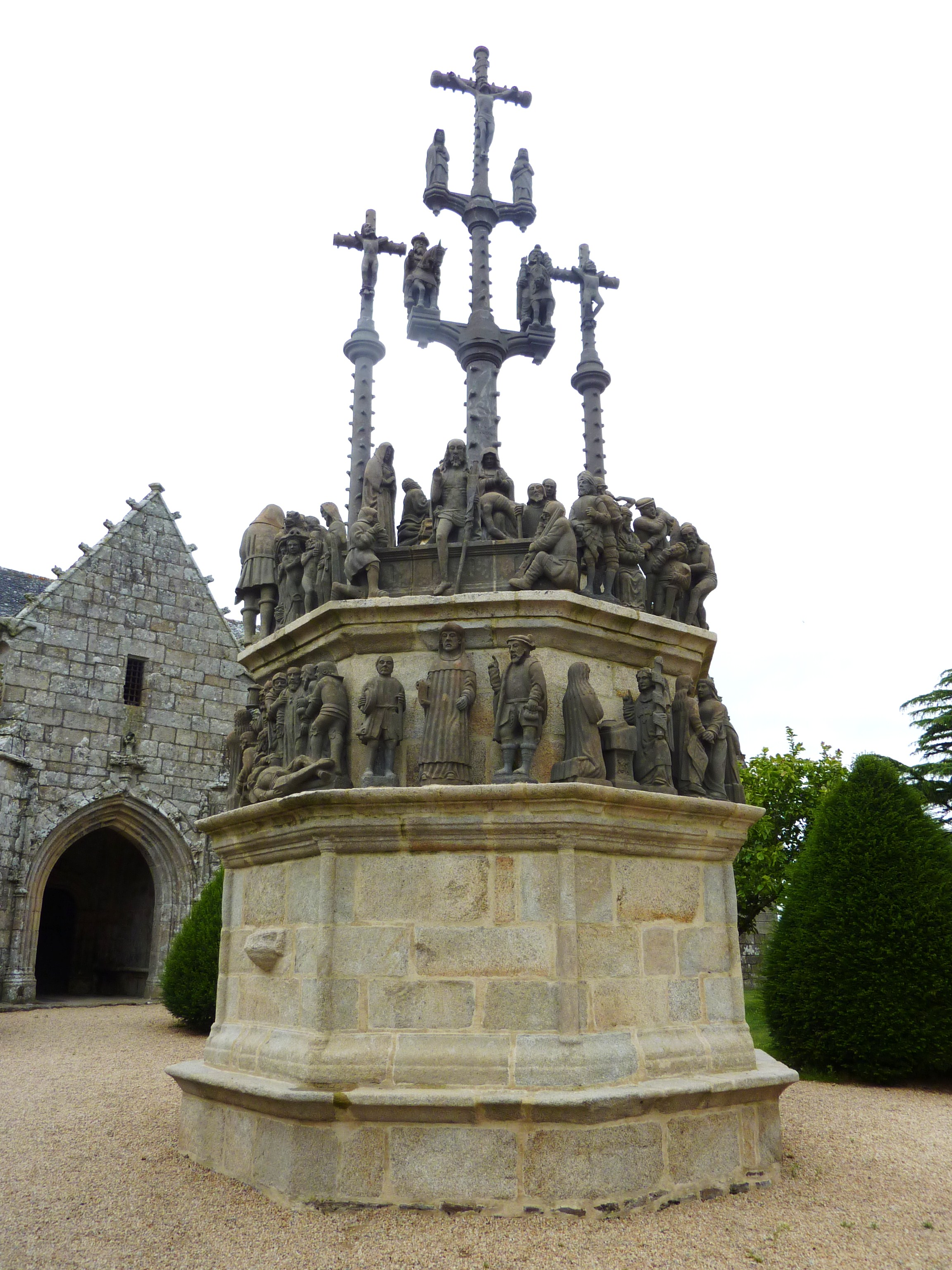
The famous calvary at Plougonven

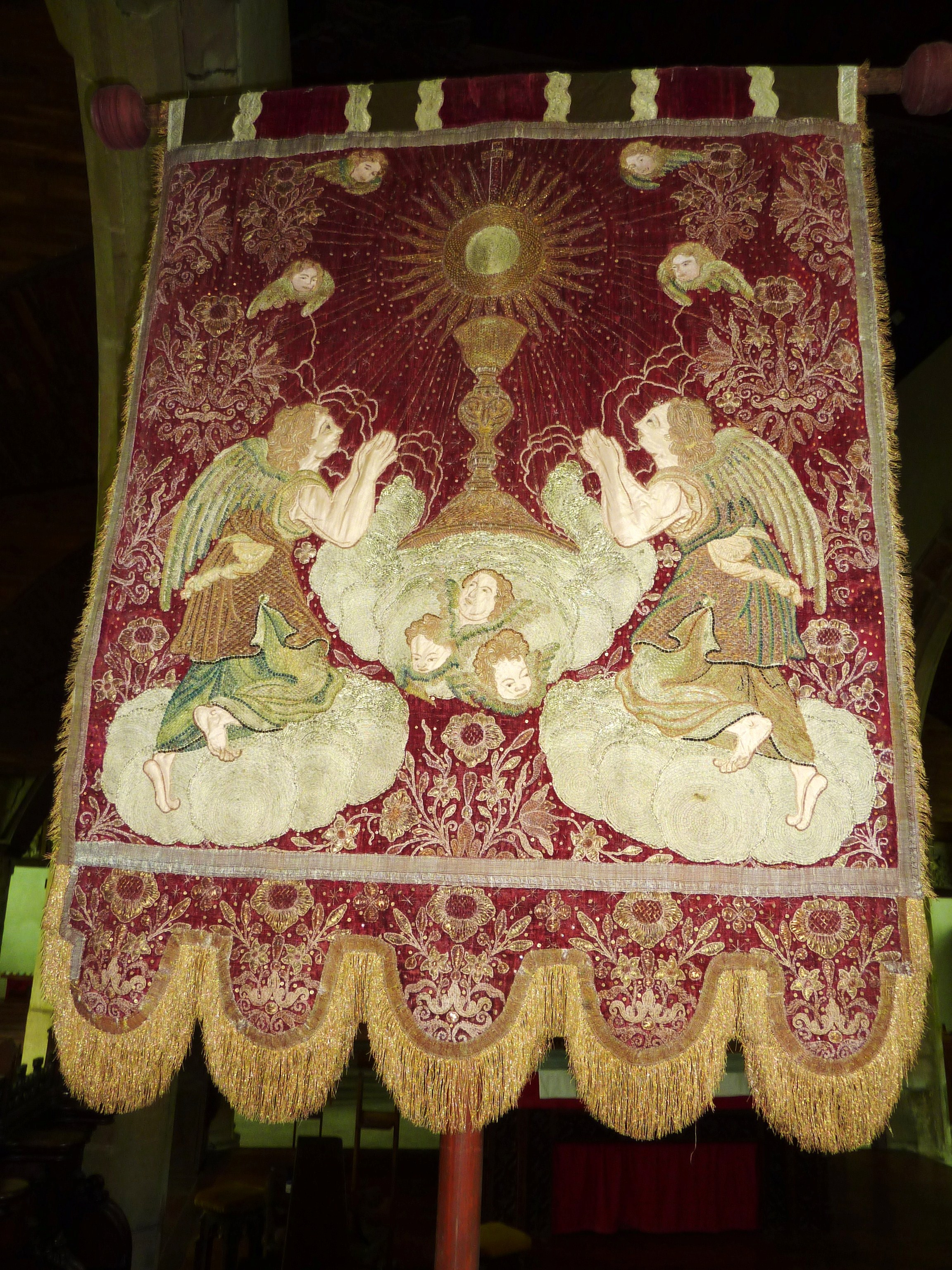
Processional banner

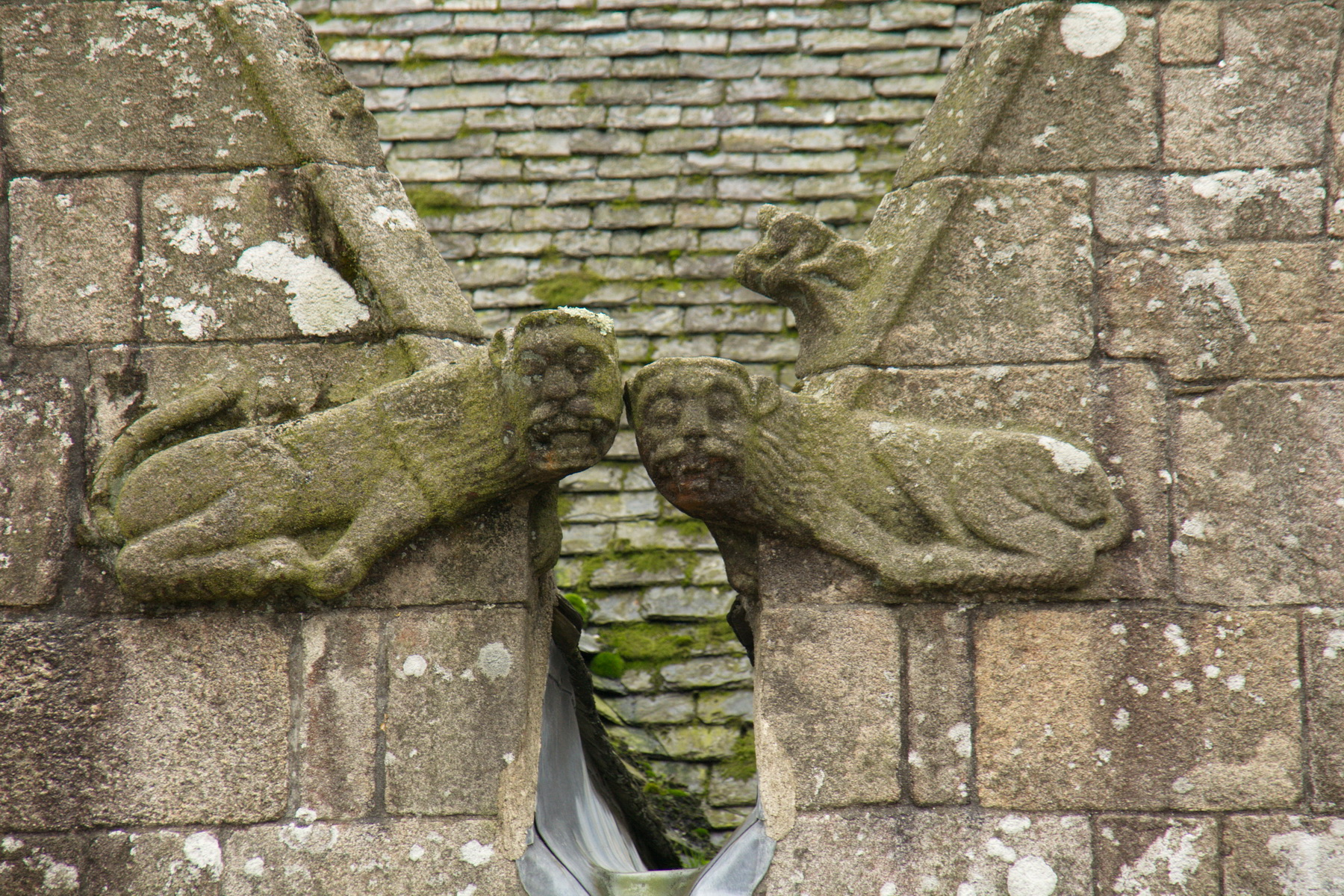
Two gargoyles at Plougonven

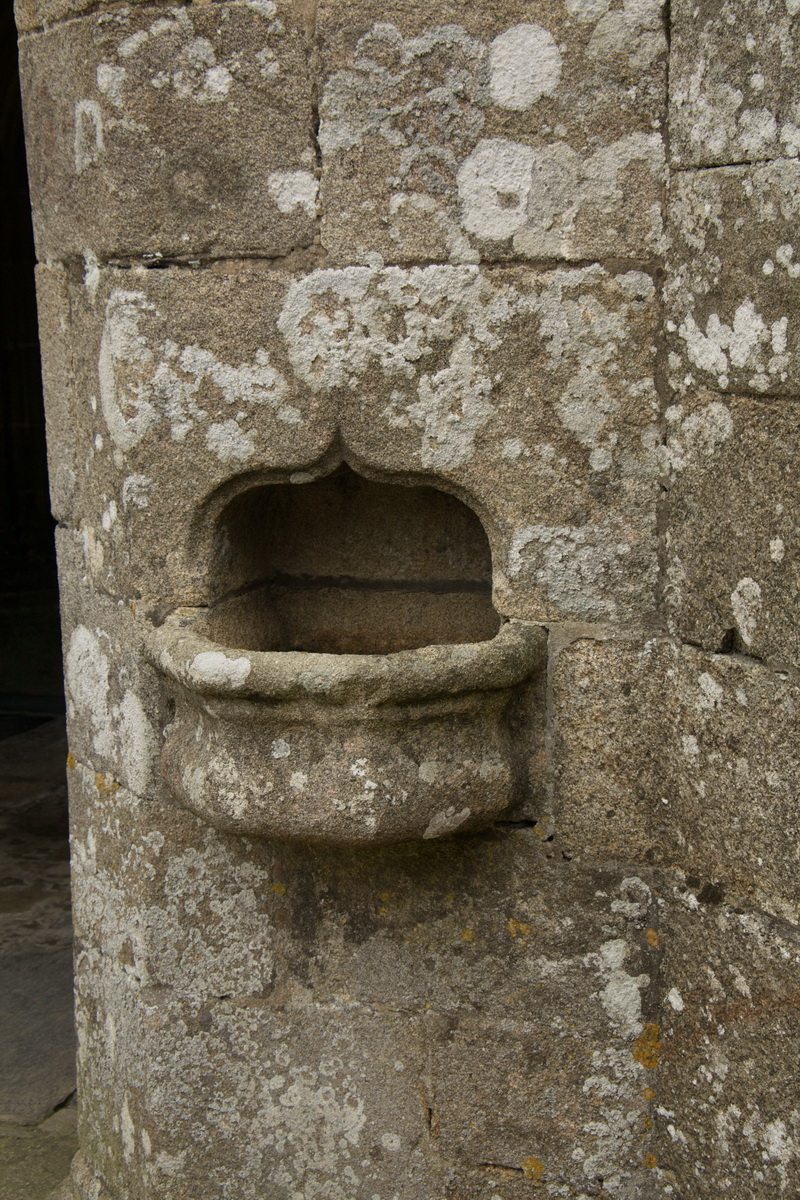
Stoup outside the church

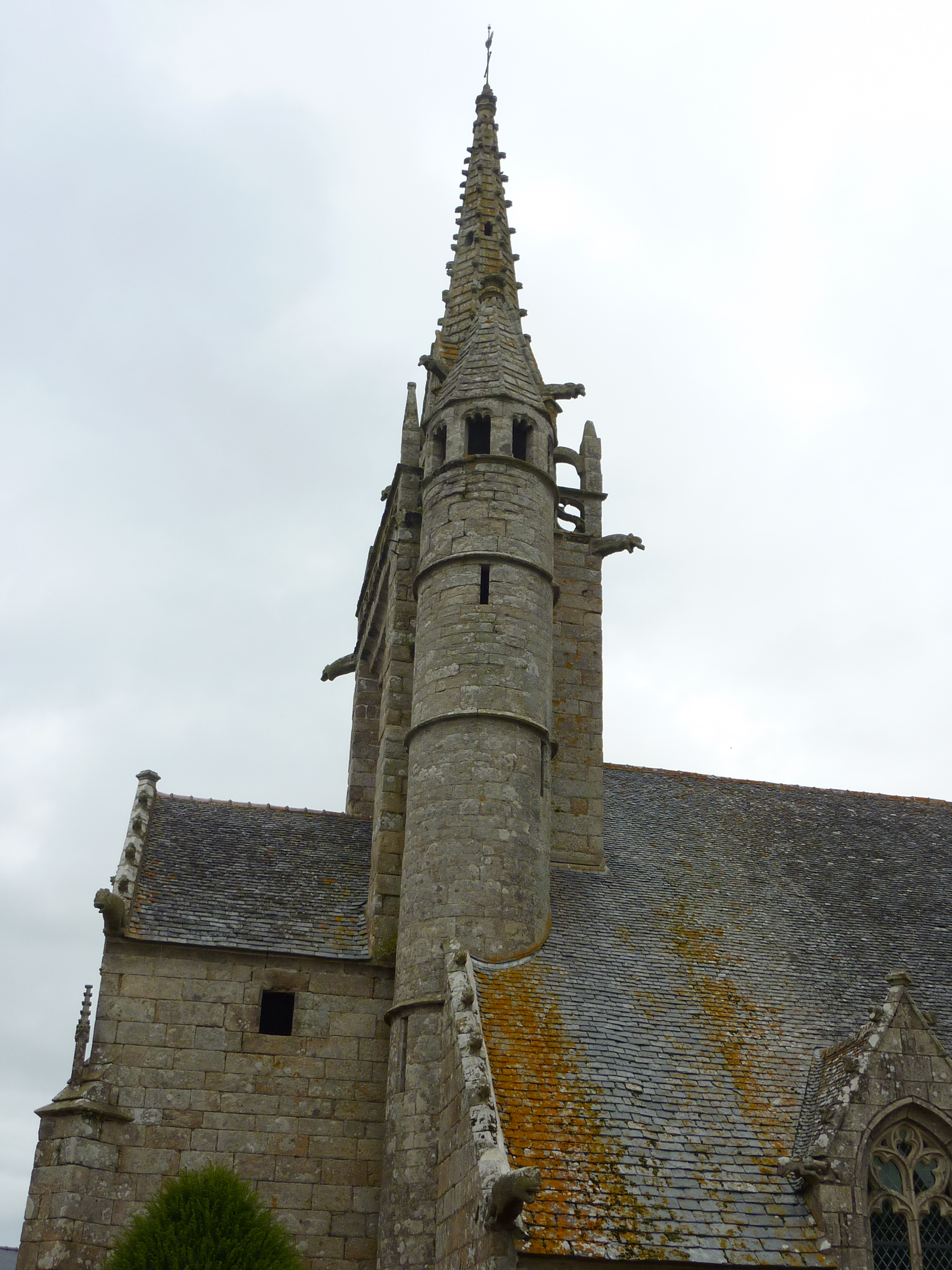
The bell tower at Plougonven

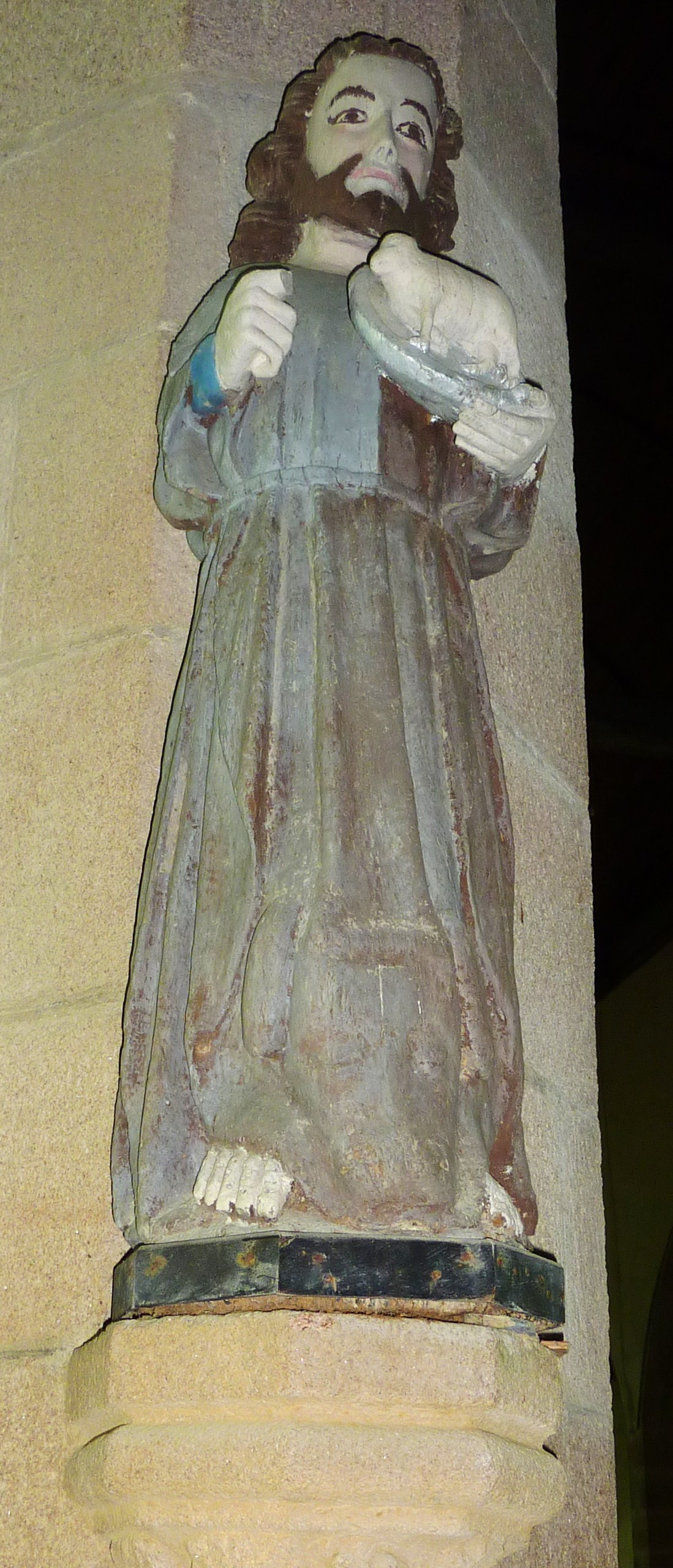
Statue of Saint Herbot

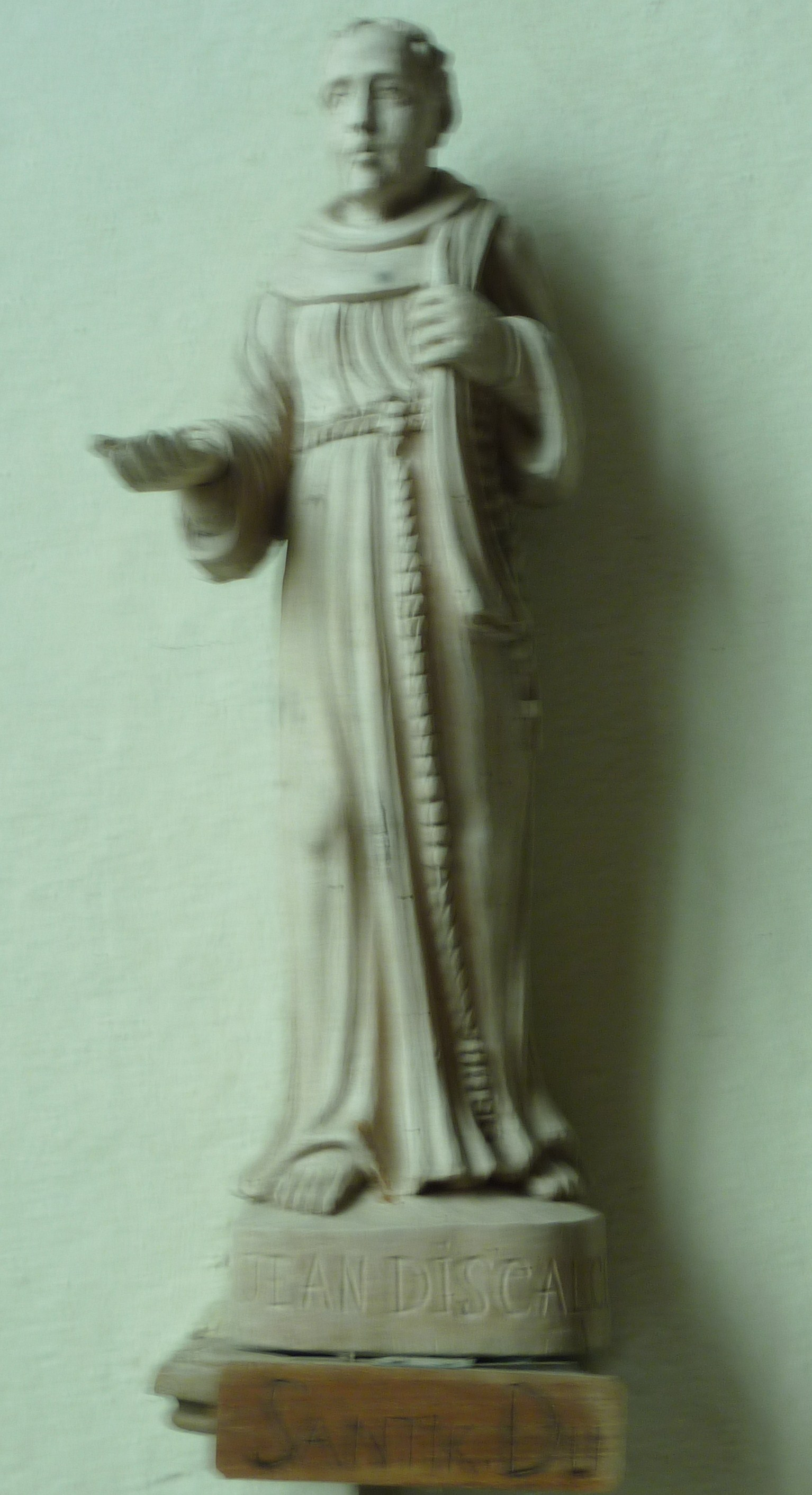
Saint Jean Discalceat. This popular Breton saint is also known as "Santig Du" and is the patron saint of the poor.

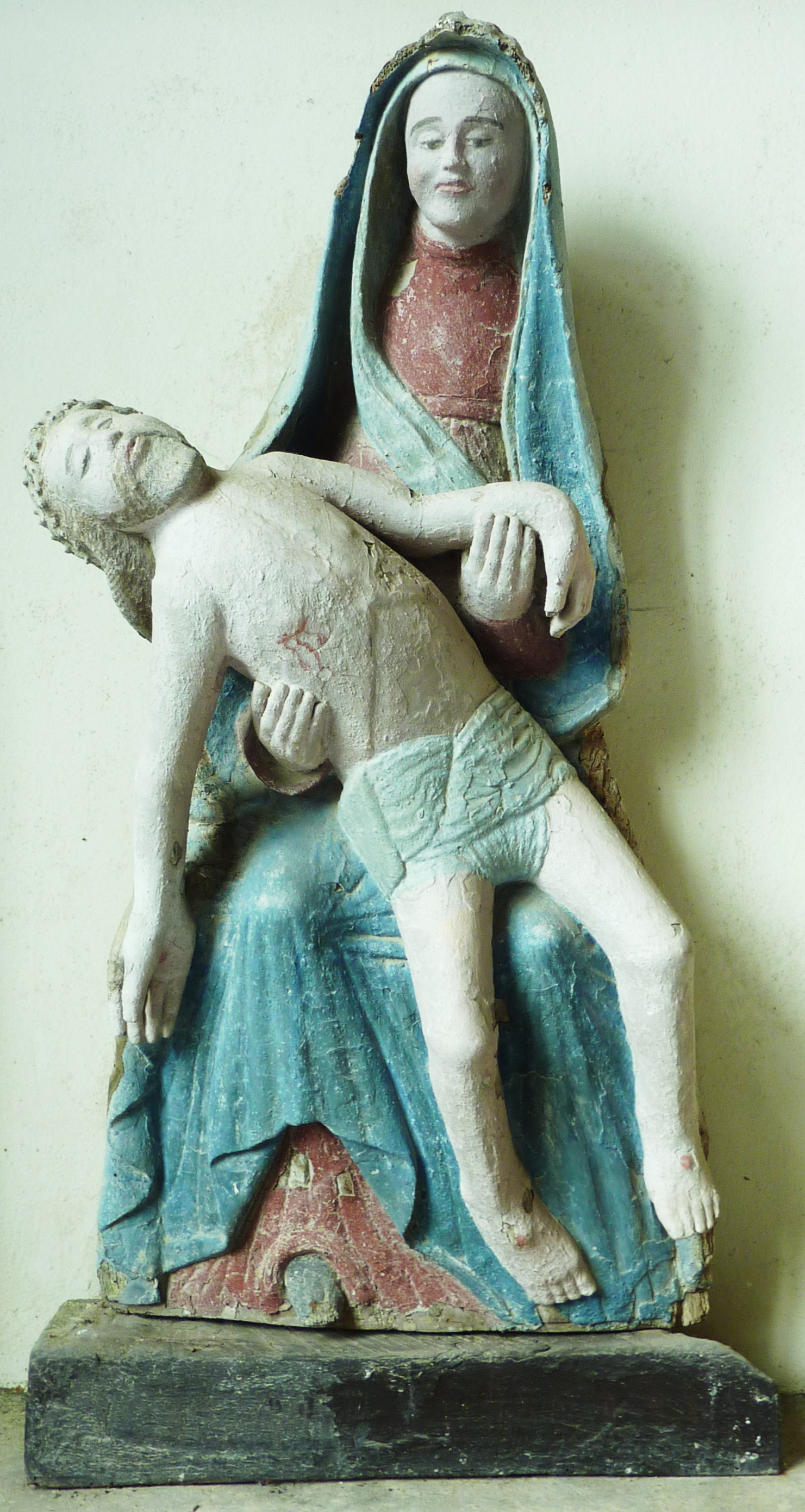
A piètà in the church

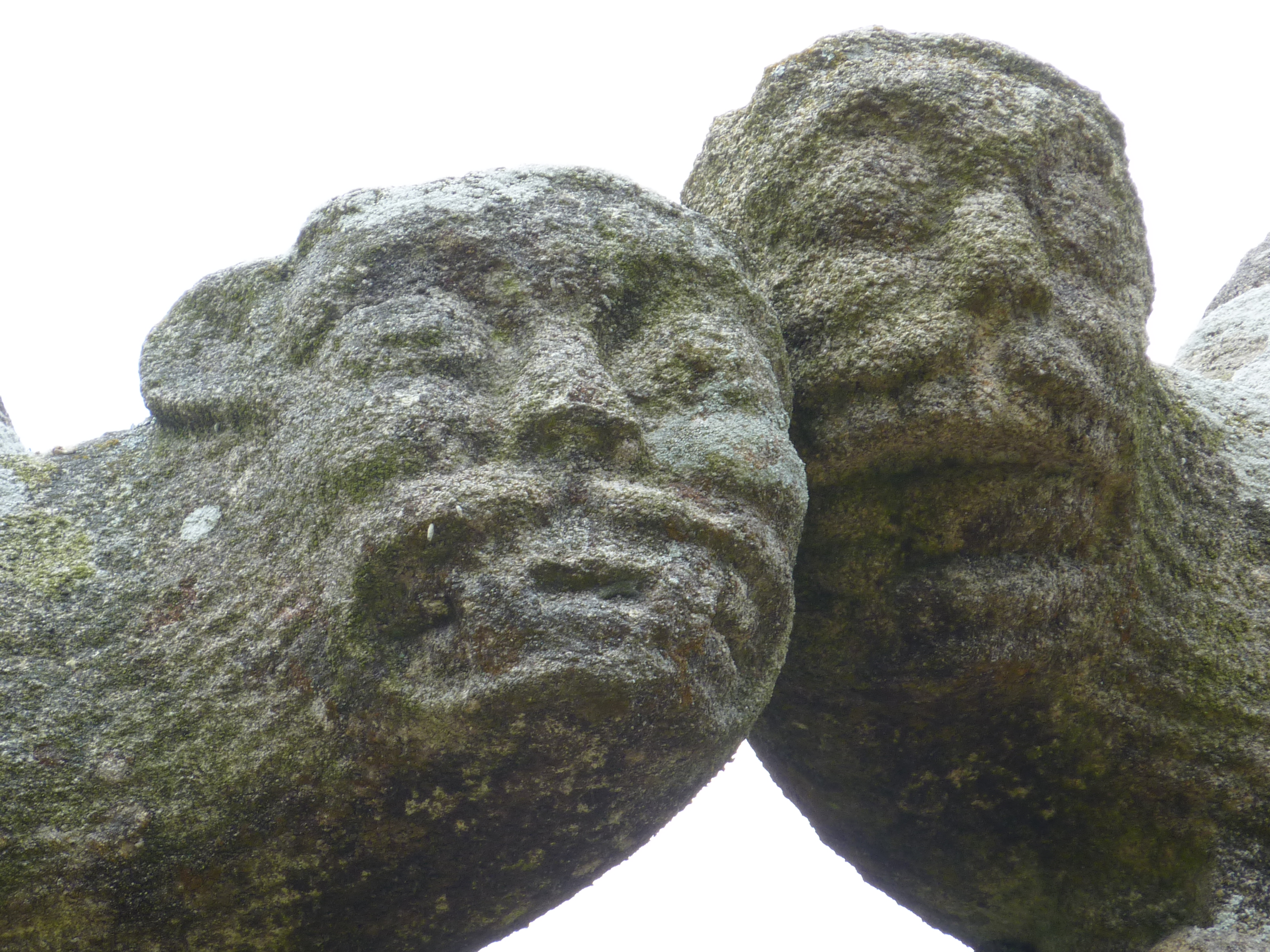
Two of the church's gargoyles. Sadly they are much worn by the elements.

== See also ==
- Plounéour-Ménez Parish close
- Plourin-lès-Morlaix Parish close
