= Brélès =

Brélès Brelez
- Commune
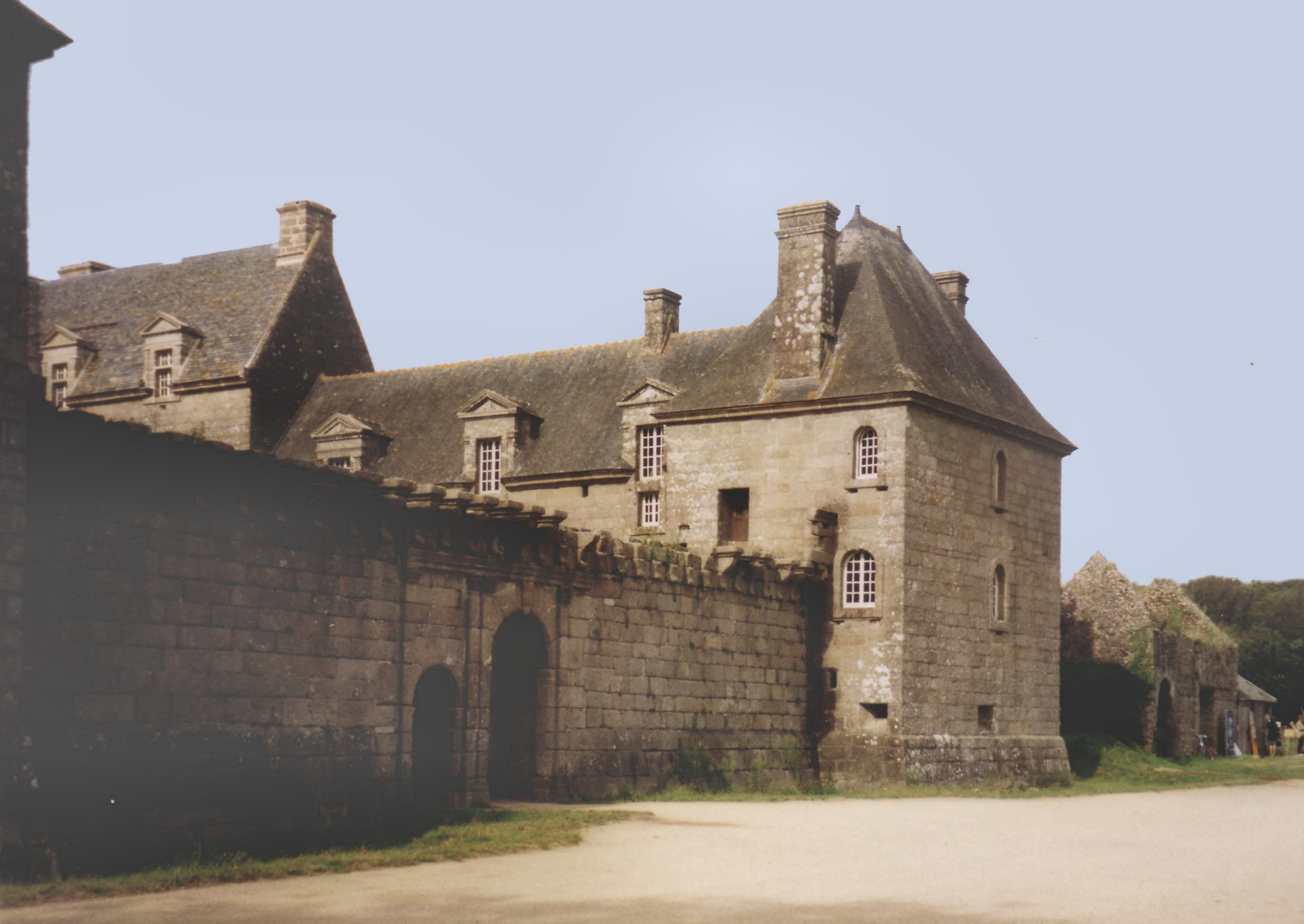
- The Chateau of Kergroades

- Coat of arms
- Location of Brélès
- Location within France Location within Brittany
- Coordinates: 48°28′44″N 4°42′44″W
- Country: France
- Region: Brittany
- Department: Finistère
- Arrondissement: Brest
- Canton: Saint-Renan
- Intercommunality: Pays d'Iroise

Government
  - Mayor (2020–2026): Guy Colin
- Area^{1}: 14.06 km^{2} (5.43 sq mi)
- Highest elevation: 101 m (331 ft)
- Lowest elevation: 0 m (0 ft)
- Population (2023): 868
  - Density: 61.7/km^{2} (160/sq mi)
- Time zone: UTC+01:00 (CET)
  - Summer (DST): UTC+02:00 (CEST)
- INSEE/Postal code: 29017 /29810
- ^{1} French Land Register data, which excludes lakes, ponds, glaciers > 1 km^{2} (0.386 sq mi or 247 acres) and river estuaries.

Brélès (French pronunciation: [bʁelɛs]; Breton: Brelez) is a commune in the Finistère department of Brittany in northwestern France.

== Population ==
Historical population
Year	Pop.	±% p.a.
1968	624	—
1975	528	−2.36%
1982	600	+1.84%
1990	763	+3.05%
1999	749	−0.21%
2007	805	+0.91%
2012	846	+1.00%
2017	875	+0.68%
2023	868	−0.13%
Source: INSEE

Inhabitants of Brélès are called Brélésiens in French.

== Sights ==
- Château de Kergroadès, 17th century
- Manoir de Bel Air, 15th century
- Manoir de Brescanvel, 16th century

== See also ==
- Communes of the Finistère department
- Yann Larhantec
