= Plougonven =

Plougonven Plougonven
- Commune
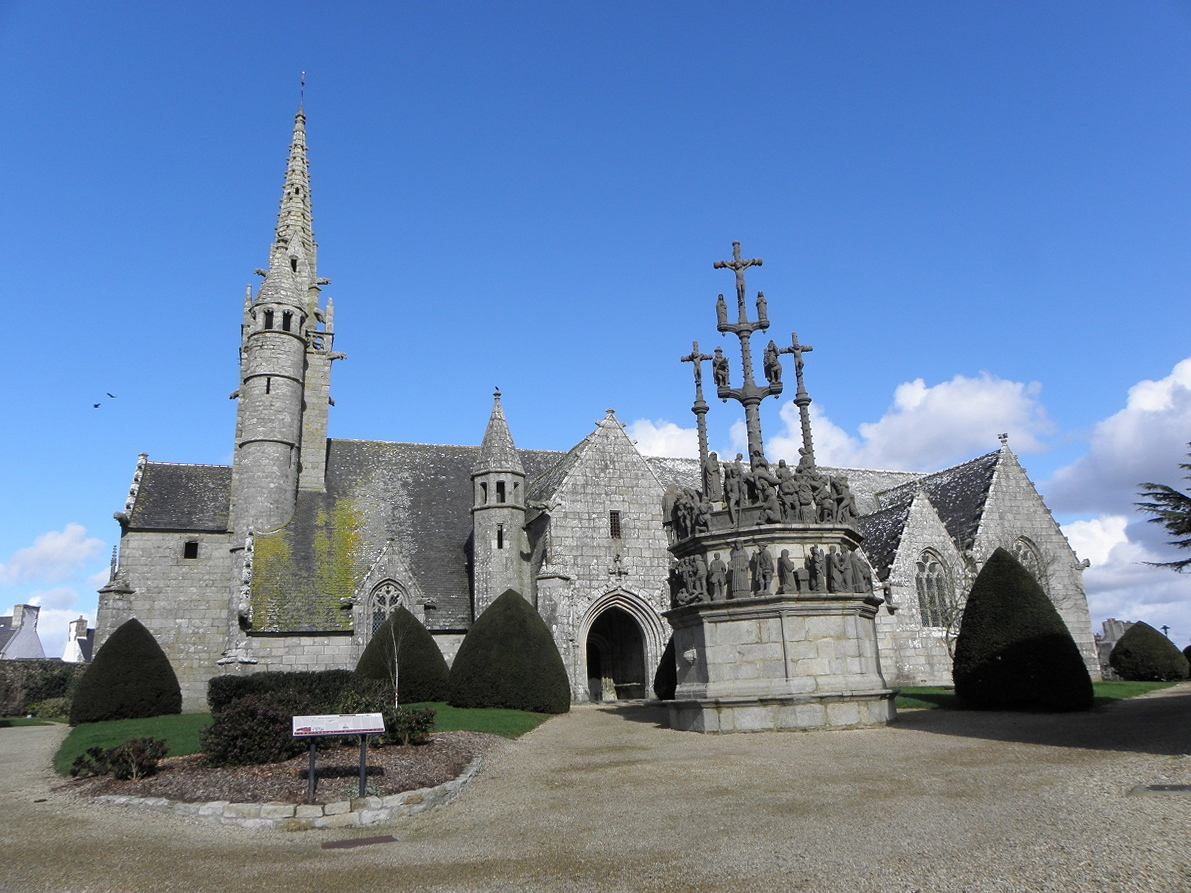
- The church and calvary in Plougonven
- Location of Plougonven
- Location within France Location within Brittany
- Coordinates: 48°31′18″N 3°42′42″W
- Country: France
- Region: Brittany
- Department: Finistère
- Arrondissement: Morlaix
- Canton: Plouigneau
- Intercommunality: Morlaix Communauté

Government
  - Mayor (2020–2026): Bernadette Auffret
- Area^{1}: 69.32 km^{2} (26.76 sq mi)
- Highest elevation: 307 m (1,007 ft)
- Lowest elevation: 19 m (62 ft)
- Population (2023): 3,382
  - Density: 48.79/km^{2} (126.4/sq mi)
- Time zone: UTC+01:00 (CET)
  - Summer (DST): UTC+02:00 (CEST)
- INSEE/Postal code: 29191 /29640
- ^{1} French Land Register data, which excludes lakes, ponds, glaciers > 1 km^{2} (0.386 sq mi or 247 acres) and river estuaries.

Plougonven (French pronunciation: [pluɡɔ̃vɛ̃]; Breton: Plougonven) is a commune in the Finistère department of Brittany in north-western France.

== Population ==
Inhabitants of Plougonven are known in French as Plougonvenois.

Historical population

Year	Pop.	±% p.a.
1793	2,225	—
1800	3,356	+6.05%
1806	3,332	−0.12%
1821	3,442	+0.22%
1831	4,193	+1.99%
1836	4,382	+0.89%
1841	4,364	−0.08%
1846	4,558	+0.87%
1851	4,419	−0.62%
1856	4,223	−0.90%
1861	1,490	−18.81%
1866	4,276	+23.47%
1872	4,323	+0.18%
1876	4,333	+0.06%
1881	3,888	−2.14%
1886	4,079	+0.96%
1891	4,097	+0.09%
1896	4,118	+0.10%
1901	4,054	−0.31%

Year	Pop.	±% p.a.
1906	4,063	+0.04%
1911	4,121	+0.28%
1921	3,884	−0.59%
1926	4,013	+0.66%
1931	3,989	−0.12%
1936	3,688	−1.56%
1946	3,540	−0.41%
1954	3,285	−0.93%
1962	2,767	−2.12%
1968	2,703	−0.39%
1975	2,782	+0.41%
1982	3,288	+2.42%
1990	3,374	+0.32%
1999	3,051	−1.11%
2007	3,206	+0.62%
2012	3,338	+0.81%
2017	3,496	+0.93%
2023	3,382	−0.55%

Source: EHESS and INSEE (1968-2023)

== International relations ==
Plougonven is twinned with Inniscarra, County Cork, Ireland (Republic of Ireland) .

== See also ==
- Communes of the Finistère department
- Parc naturel régional d'Armorique
- Yann Larhantec Sculptor
- Calvary at Plougonven
- Plougonven Parish close
