= Yann Larhantec =

French sculptor

Yann Larc'hantec or Yann Larhantec
- Born: 30 May 1829; Plougonven
- Died: 11 January 1913 (aged 83); Landerneau
- Occupation: Sculptor

Yann Larc'hantec or Yann Larhantec was a Breton sculptor born in Plougonven on 30 May 1829. He died in Landerneau on 11 January 1913.

== Biography ==
Yann Larc'hantec or Yann Larhantec was born on 30 May 1829 in Plougonven and died on 11 January 1913 in Landerneau. He was the son of farmers Jean-Marie and Françoise Guillou. He spent most of his life in Morlaix and most of his work involved crosses and calvaries and he was entrusted with the repair and restoration of many of the great Breton calvaries of the 15th and 16th centuries. His main works are listed below.

== Main works ==
Note
"Enclos paroissial"

In the text below there are several references to an "enclos paroissial" and this French term can be translated as parish close. These are not uncommon in Finistère and were built in the 16th and 17th centuries. The enclosure comprises an elaborately decorated parish church surrounded by an entirely walled churchyard with gateway, often an arched gateway. In England cathedral closes for example, include many residential and administrative buildings, as well as the church, but Breton Parish closes contained only buildings and structures designed for worship: the church itself, a calvary, and sometimes an ossuary or charnel house with chapel and a cemetery. The calvaries of such church enclosures are significant works of popular art and more often than not they display Christ and the two thieves whilst at the base many feature relief panels, free-standing sculptural groups or both. These groups depict onlookers of the crucifixion and nearly always include the Virgin Mary and John the Evangelist, but also many other heroes and villains – sometimes including local or national magnates. The ossuaries in such enclosures are often of large proportions and some were intended to contain large sculptures or paintings, frequently of the Deposition or Entombment of Christ. In most cases the bones have been moved from the ossuary to the cemetery although a few still hold skeletal remains.

=== Calvary at Saint-Thégonnec ===
Apart from the Grand Calvaire at Saint-Thégonnec (see Saint-Thégonnec Parish close) there is a second calvary constructed in 1864 with statues by Yann Larhantec of the Virgin Mary and John the Evangelist. This calvary is set into the enclosure wall and accessed by a double stairway.

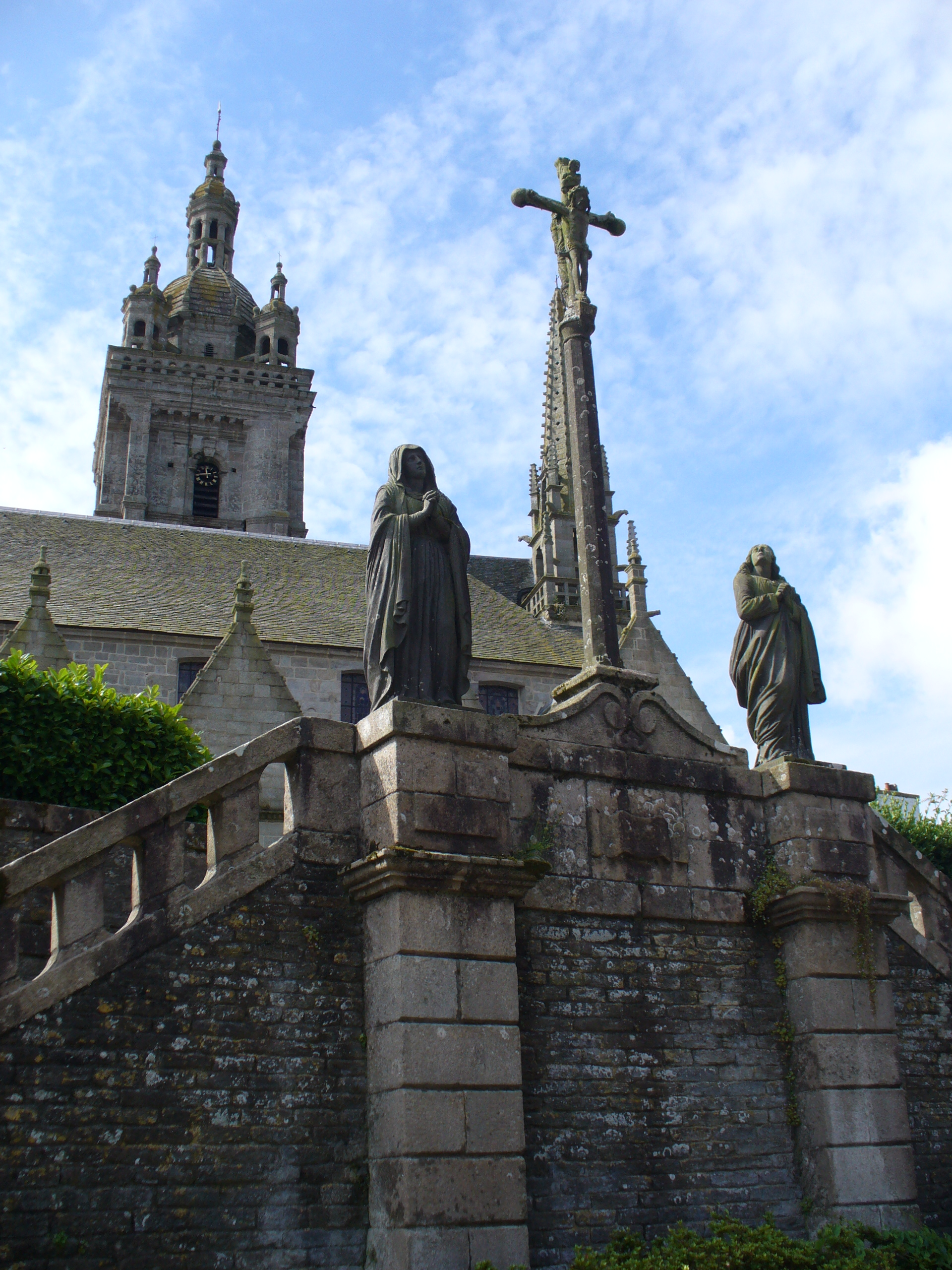
The Larhantec calvary at Saint-Thégonnec

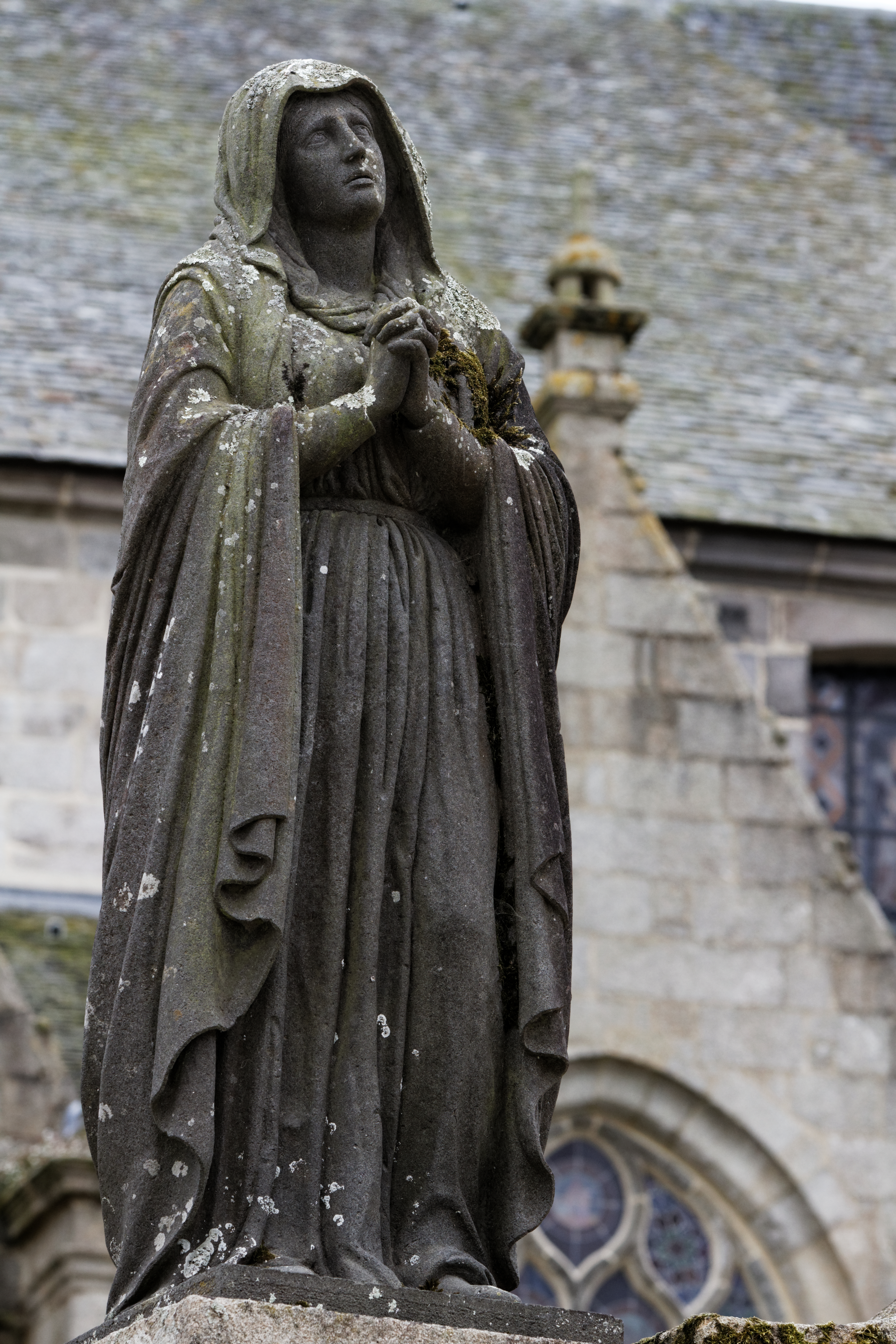
The Virgin Mary looks up towards Jesus on the cross- The Larhantec calvary at Saint-Thégonnec

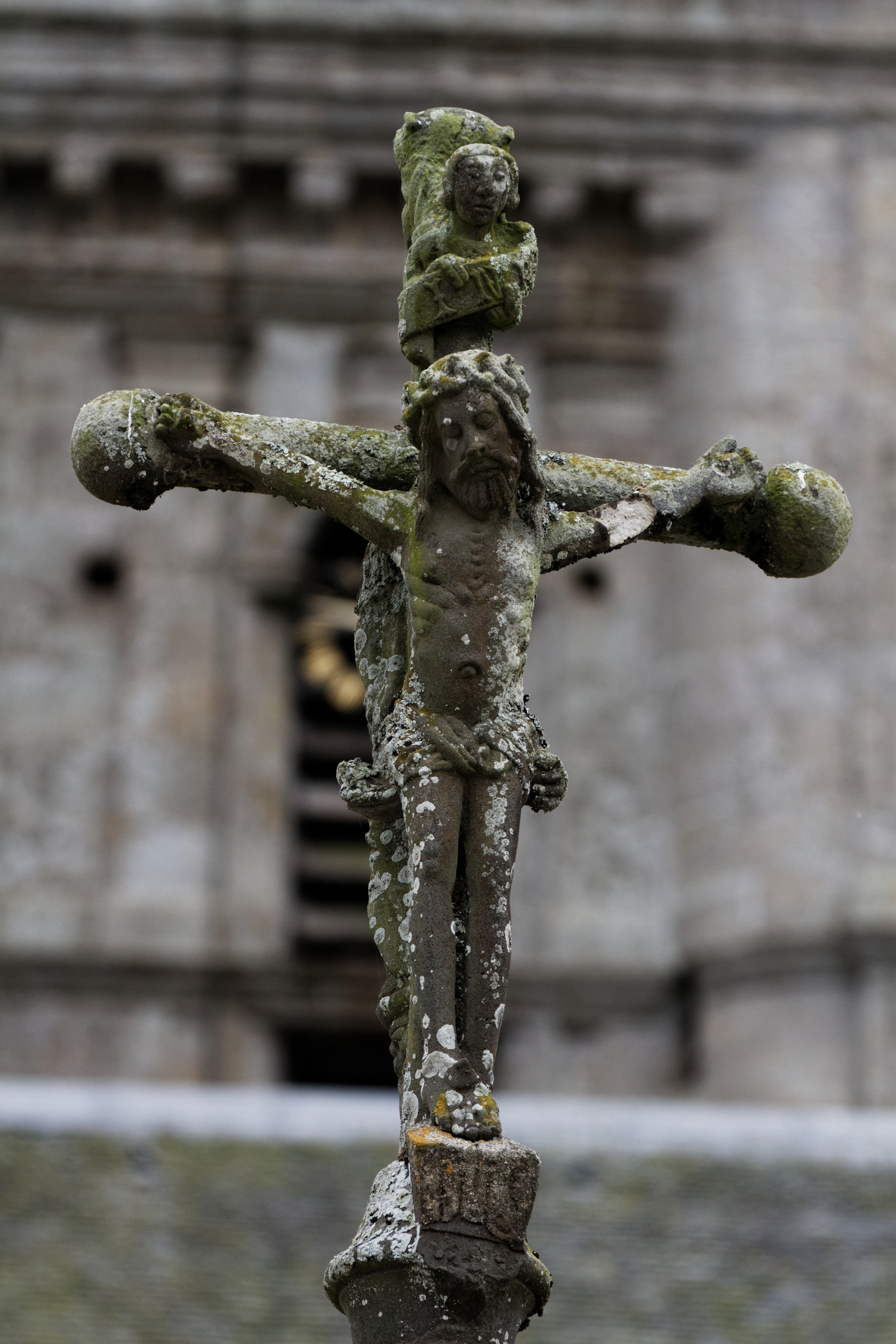
Jesus on the cross-The Larhantec calvary at Saint-Thégonnec

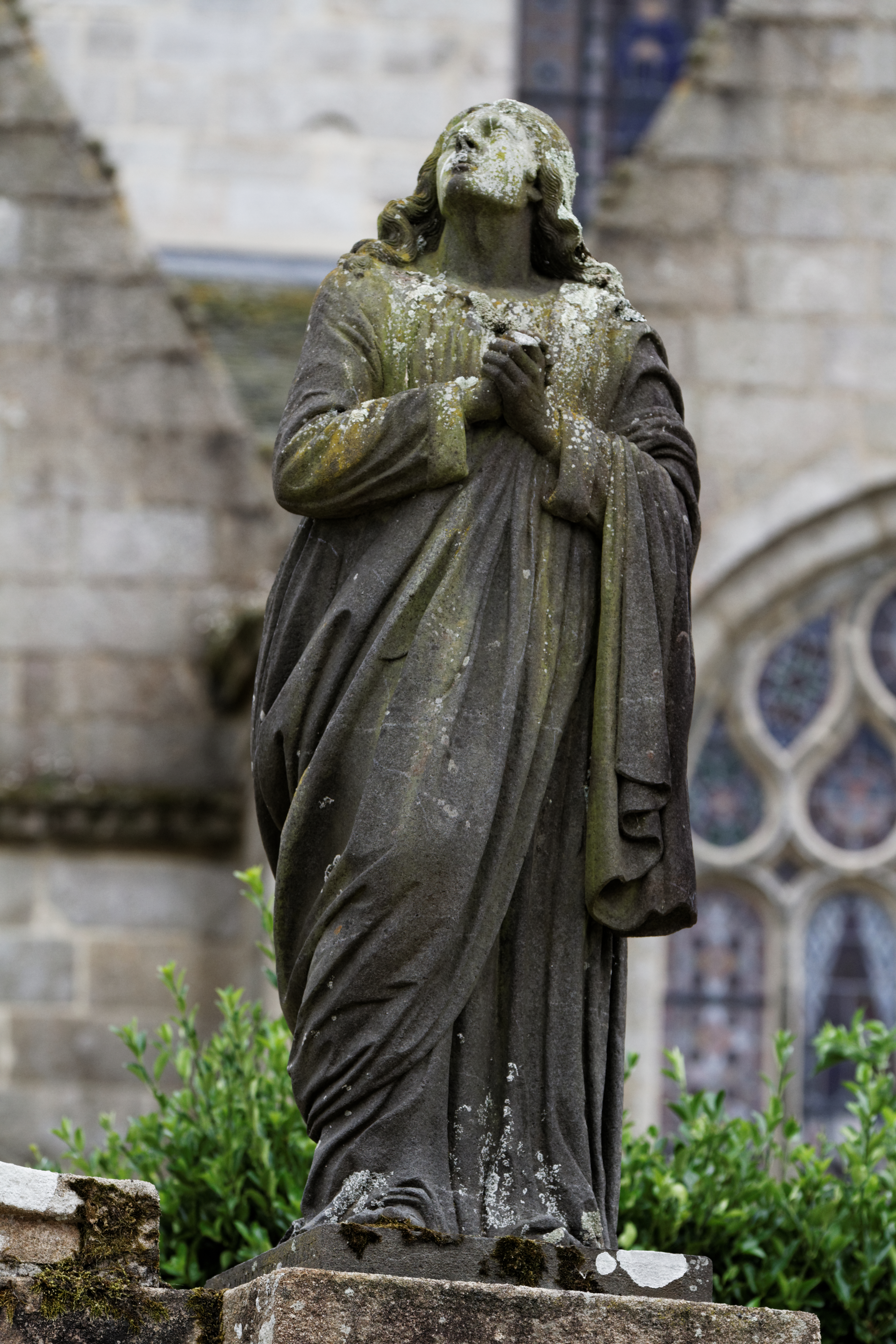
John the Evangelist looks up towards Jesus on the cross-The Larhantec calvary at Saint-Thégonnec

=== Église paroissiale Notre-Dame ===
Larhantec executed sculptures for this Quimperlé church.

=== Pleyben's "Croix de cimetière" ===
This 7-metre-high (23 ft) cross by Larhantec dates to 1869. The pedestal has reliefs depicting instruments of the passion. The cross carries inscriptions remembering particular "missions" or pilgrimages; that of 1869, 1906 and 1924. The cross is located in the cemetery.

=== The Calvary at Clohars-Carnoët ===
Clohars-Carnoët has many sculptures dating back to the 16th and 17th century but Larhantec was responsible for the two "croix de mission" dating to 1879 and 1901.

=== The "Croix de Mission" of Kerlouan ===
This 7-metre-high (23 ft) cross is situated near the Saint Anne chapel in Kerlouan's Square d'Orschwir. It was sculpted in Kersanton granite and on the four faces of the pedestal Larhantec has carved depictions of the passion. Plaques mention the missions of 1911 and 1925.

=== Église Saint-Jean-Baptiste de la Feuillée ===
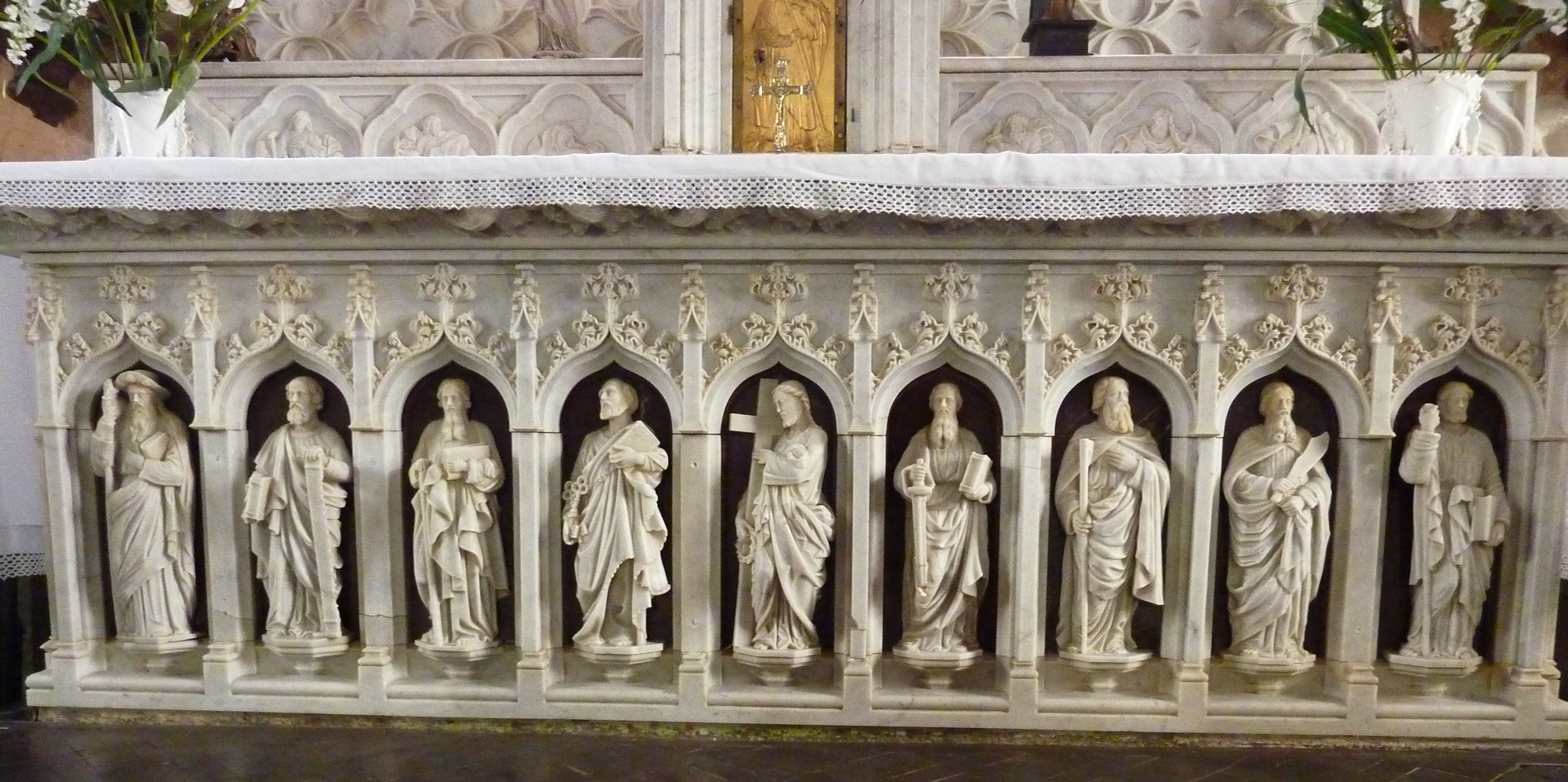
Église Saint-Jean-Baptiste de la Feuillée altar

Larhantec executed statues in white marble for the altar of this Plougonven church in 1866.

=== The Calvary of Plougourvest ===
Located in Plougourvest's cemetery this Larhantec Calvary dates to 1870.

=== "La croix de Brézal" ===
In 1895/1896 Albert Le Roux, the owner of Brézal, commissioned Larhantec to execute this 6-metre-high (20 ft) cross at Plounéventer

=== Esquibien ===
Yan Larhantec completed this Calvary in 1868. It is 7 metres high.

=== The Calvary at Saint-Vougay ===
Larhantec executed this Calvary in 1866. It is known as "La croix de Traon-Meur" and is 7 metres in height. A plaque makes reference to the mission of 1866. The calvary is located in the cemetery.

=== The Calvary at Locquirec ===
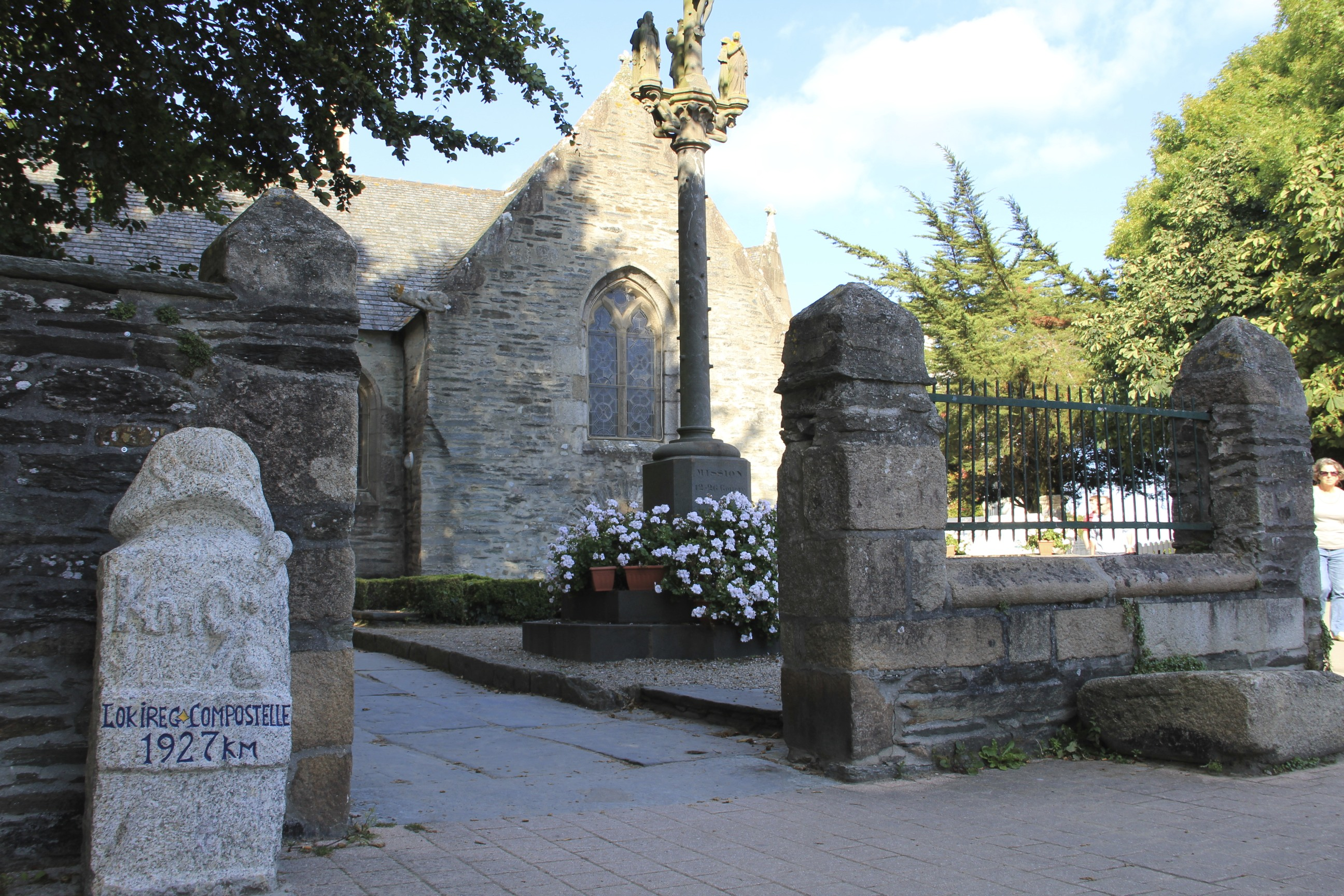
Larhantec's Calvary and Locquirec's church

A Larhantec Calvary of 5.50 metres dating to 1891 stands outside the Saint Jacque church in Locquirec. The figures placed under the Cross represent John the Evangelist back to back with Saint Roch and the Virgin Mary back to back with Saint Peter. Also included are two horned grimacing devils.

=== The "calvaire du cimetière" at Landivisiau ===
Larhantec's 7 metre high Calvary in Landivisiau's cemetery dates to 1865. Bears the inscription

"MISSION 1865"

=== The Calvary at Confort-Meilars ===
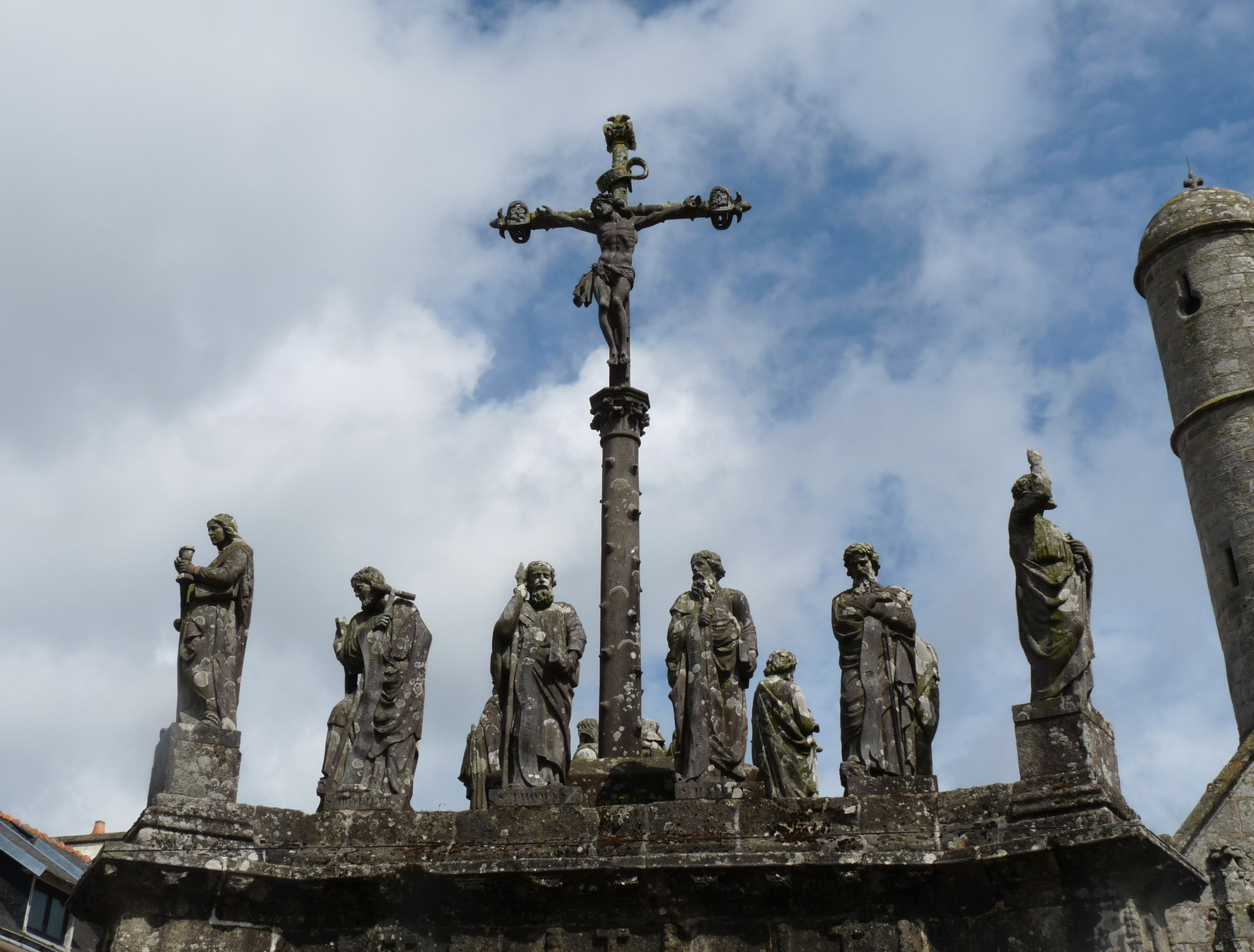
The Calvary at the Église Notre-Dame de Confort in Meilars-Confort

The Église Notre-Dame de Confort at Confort-Meilars dates back to 1528 and 1544 and the Calvary stands near the west porch. The Calvary was decorated with statues of the apostles but these were broken during the French revolution and then lost their heads in 1849. These were subsequently restored and placed in some unused niches on the west façade of the church. In 1870 Yan Larc'hantec executed several 1.70 metre high statues for the Calvary. The figure of Christ was hit by lightning in 1978 and restored by Pierre Floch.

=== The "Calvaire du Croissant" at Lothey ===
This Calvary by Larhantec dates to 1899 and the pedestal carries the inscription

"O VOS OMNES QUI TRANSITIS PER VIAM ATTENDITE ET VIDETE SI EST DOLOR SICUT DOLOR MEUS. HOC SIGNUM CRUCIS ERIT IN COELO CUM DOMINUS AD JUDICANDUM VENERIT. HANC CRUCEM AB INSIGNI SCULPTAM IANN LARHANTEC. EREXIT PATERFAMILIAS AD FILIOS IN FIDE STABILIENDOS"

=== François-Louis Soubigou ===
In 1903, Lanhartec sculpted a relief depicting Soubigou for the family grave in Plounéventer's cemetery.

=== Église Saint-Yves de Plougonven ===
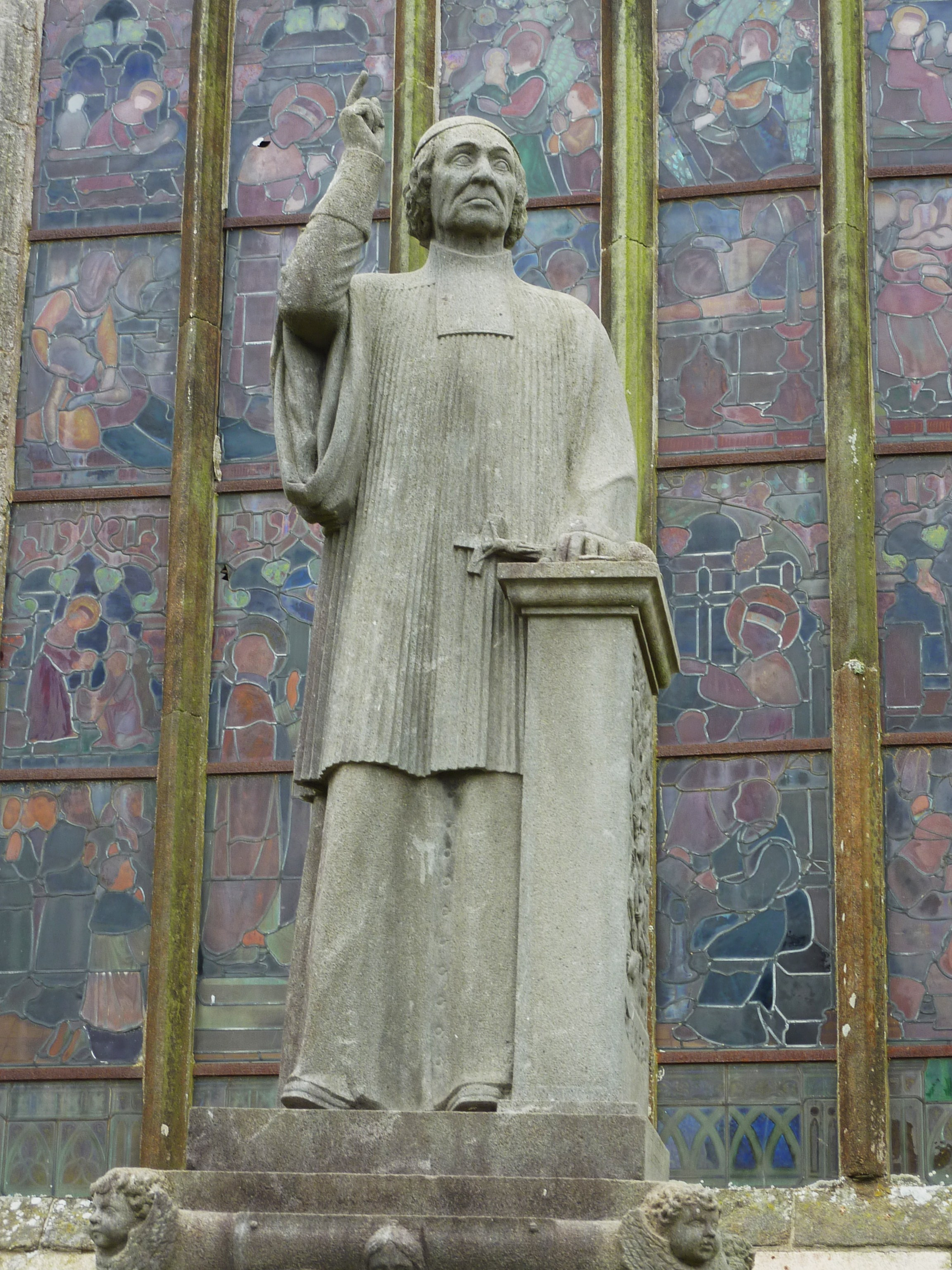
Statue de Bernard François Marie Le Teurnier

Plougonven's parish church in the Trégor region was built in the early 16th century in the flamboyant gothic style. The church together with the Calvary and a burial chapel and ossuary are grouped together in the "enclos paroissial de Plougonven". It has been classified as a "monument historiques" since 7 March 1916. The church's altars were fashioned from Kersanton stone by Larhantec. The Calvary, regarded as one of Brittany's finest, dates to 1554 and was the creation of Bastien and Henry Prigent. Many of the Prigent sculptures were destroyed during the Terror and in 1897 Larhantec reconstructed the crucifixion cross. Amongst those included in the sculptural composition are Saint Yves a much venerated Saint in Brittany and Satan ("Le Diable de la tentation") and the three kings Balthazar, Melchior and Gaspard. The chapel has sober lines in contrast to the flamboyance of the church and the ossuary contains the tomb of the Abbé Le Teurnier decorated with the Abbe's statue sculpted by Larhantec. Several photographs of the Prigent calvary can be seen in the gallery below.

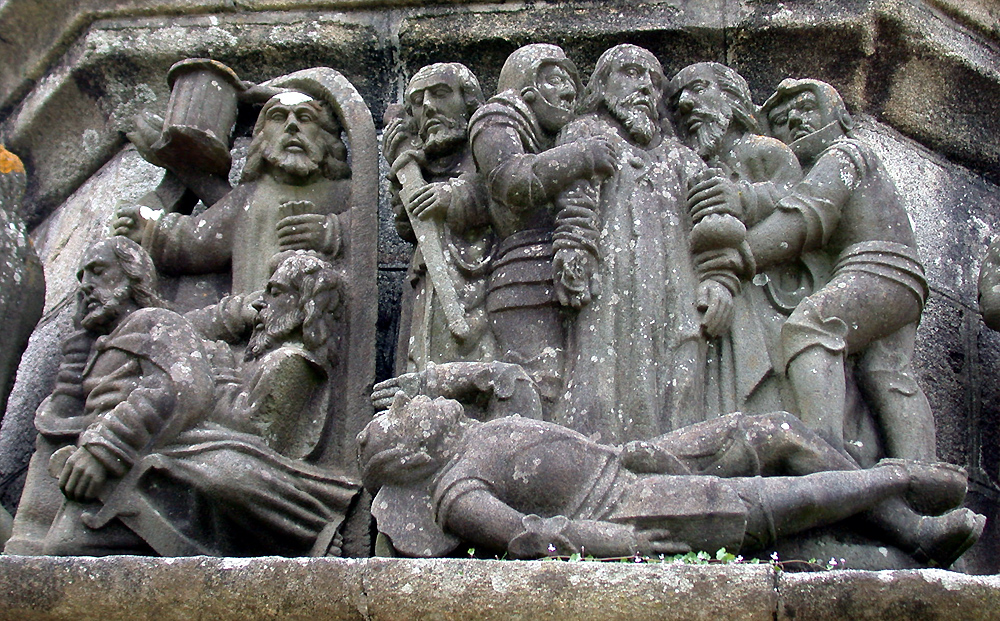
Detail from the Plougonven calvary. Jesus is taken into custody

=== The parish church of Saint-Pierre ===
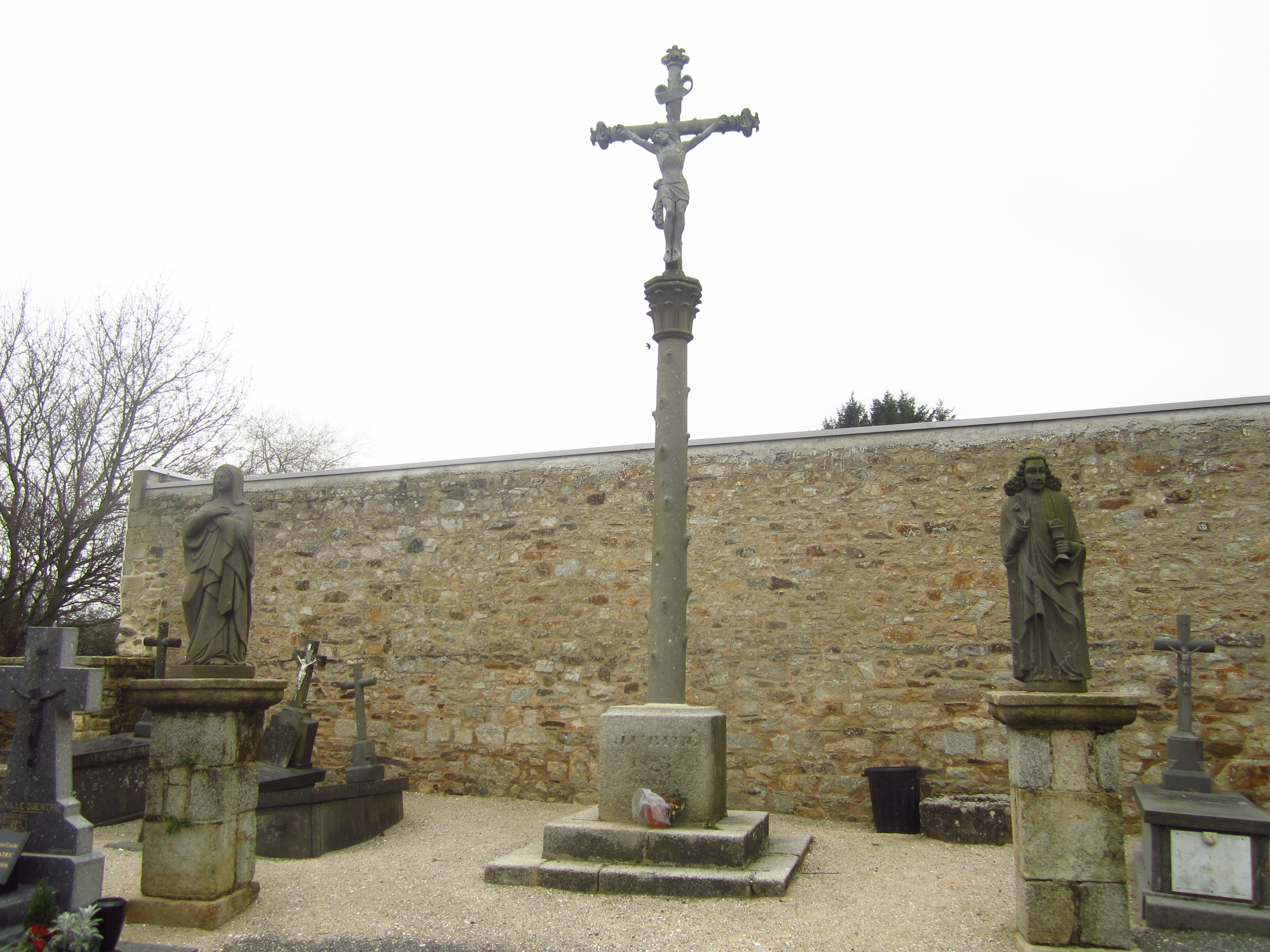
The Poulgar Calvary. Roland Doré's St John can be seen to the right of the Cross

This church in Plougar has a Calvary in its graveyard sculpted by Larhantec with statues of the Virgin Mary and St John on either side of the Cross bearing the crucified Jesus. The statue of St John is in fact a Roland Doré work which dates back to the early 17th Century. The inscription near the cross reads

"JUBILE 1875 MISSION"

=== The War Memorial of Saint-Pol-de-Léon ===
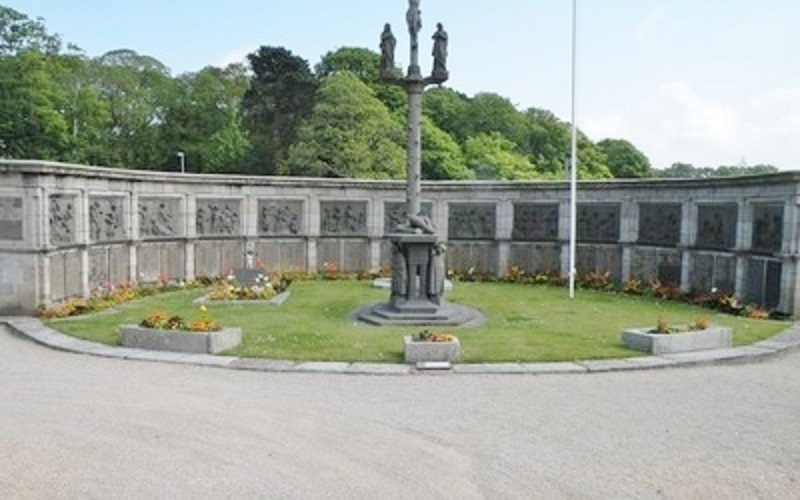
Saint-Pol-de-Léon war memorial with calvary by Larhantec and René Quillivic's remarkable central sculpture

This war memorial by René Quillivic is reckoned to be Finistère's first memorial to the dead of the 1914-1918 war and was placed in front of the existing Larhantec calvary and a semi-circular wall decorated with a "Chemin de croix" by Donnart.

=== Calvaries at Guiclan ===
Several Larhantec works can be seen in Guiclan. His calvary of 1884 in north Guiclan is 7 metres high and is inscribed "40 JOURS D’INDULGENCES EN DISANT 5 PATER ET 5 AVE". He also worked on the calvary at Mézavel in 1891 and restored the Prigent calvary at Croix-Neuve in 1889. In 1863 he had also restored the calvary at Keruil and executed the calvary at Lézérazien in 1875.

=== Bodilis "calvaire du cimetière" ===
In 1875 Larhantec completed a 6.50-metre-high (21.3 ft) Calvary for the Bodilis cemetery.

=== Église Saint-Jean-Baptiste ===
In 1860 Larhantec carved various gargoyles and sculptural decoration for this church in La Feuillée There is a Larhantec calvary in the La Feuillée cemetery.

=== The Calvary at Brélès ===
This "Calvaire du cimetière" dates to 1879 and is five metres high.

=== Morlaix Église Saint-Mélaine ===
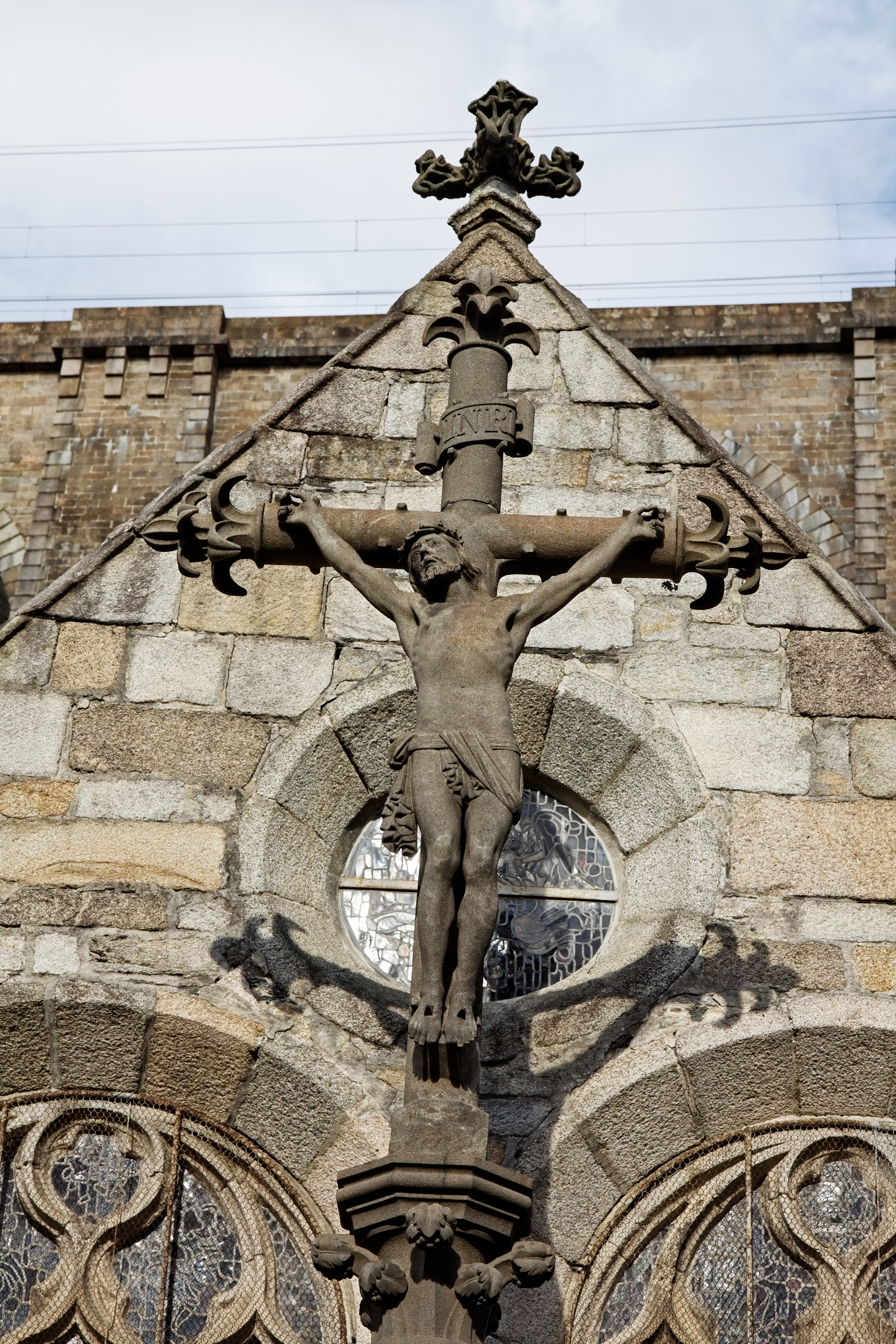
Larhantec Calvary outside the Morlaix Église Saint-Mélaine

Larhantec completed a calvary for this church near Morlaix' viaduct bridge in the parish of Notre Dame du Mur.

=== The Calvary at Guipavas ===
Attached to Guipavas' Église Saint-Pierre-et-Saint-Paul, this Larhantec Calvary dates to 1883 and is nine metres in height.

== Other works by Larhantec ==
Larhartec worked on the "Calvaire de l'église"'s at Guimaëc, Guipavas and Locquirec, the "Calvaire du cimetière"'s at Landivisiau and Plougourvest, a statue on Plouzané's fontaine Saint-Sané and a "Croix du cimetière" in Sainte-Sève. The "Calvaire du Luzec" at Saint-Thégonnec has also been attributed to Larhartec.

=== "Tombeau de prêtre" ===
Larhantec sculpted this figure of a praying priest in Clohars-Carnoët's cemetery. It decorates the grave of Jean-Marie Drogou, a Clohars-Carnoët rector. Larhantec carried out another two sculptures of priests at prayer and these can be seen in Quimperlé's Saint-David cemetery.

=== The calvary at Plouguerneau ===
This 9 metre Calvary was created by Larhantec to mark the "mission" of 1881. Marie-Madeleine is placed at the bottom of the Cross and in tears. One of the inscriptions on the Calvary reads

"Souvenir de la mission de 1881 et du Jubilé. 3 Pater 3 Ave 40 jours d’indulgence"

=== The Calvary at Kerlouan ===
This 7-metre-high (23 ft) Calvary dates to 1872 and is located in the old cemetery attached to Kerlouan's Sainte-Anne's chapel.
