= Saint-Jean-du-Doigt Parish close =

Coordinates: 48.6943°N 3.7730°W

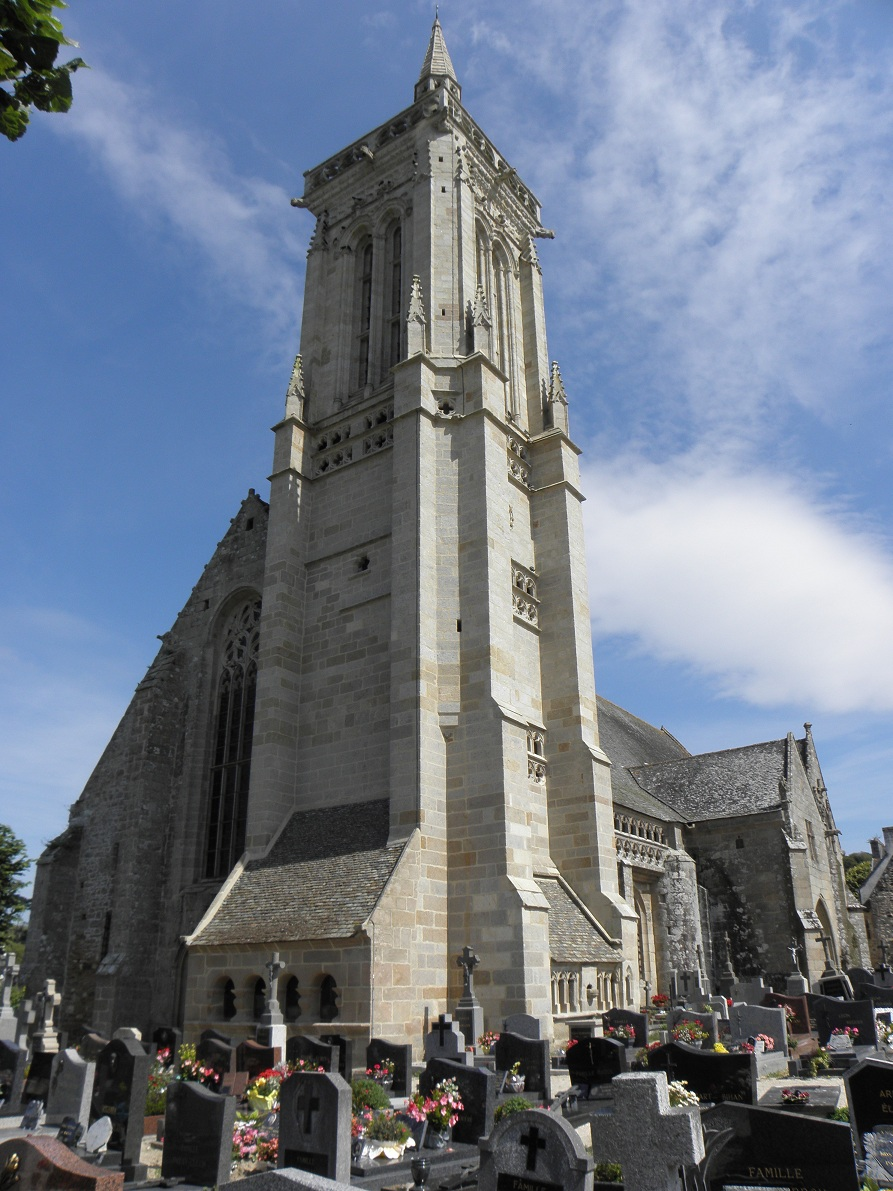
The church at Saint-Jean-du-Doigt

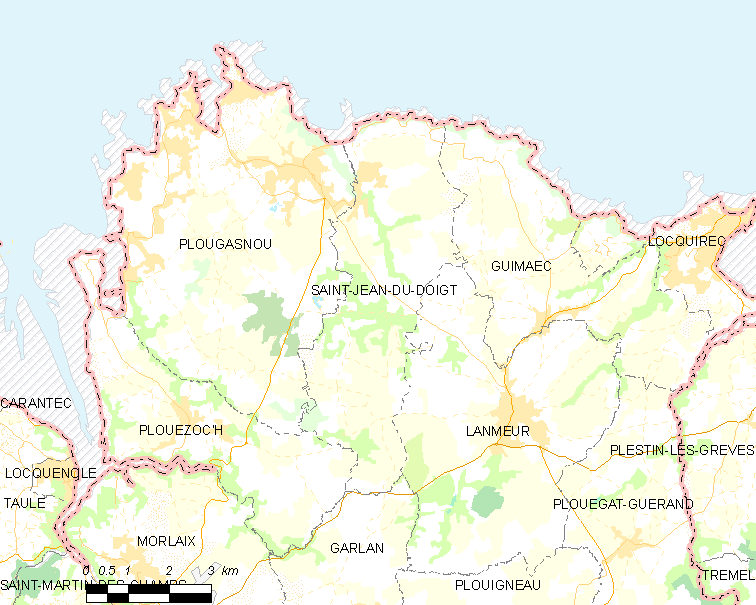
Map showing the location of Saint-Jean-du-Doigt

The Saint-Jean-du-Doigt Parish close (Enclos paroissial) is located at Saint-Jean-du-Doigt In the arrondissement of Morlaix in Brittany in north-western France. The enclos paroissial comprises the church of Saint-Jean-Baptiste, a large ornamental fountain, the cemetery, two ossuaries attached to the church and an enclosing wall with an "arc de triomphe" style entrance. Saint-Jean-du-Doigt is some 12 kilomètres northeast of Morlaix. The church dates back to around 1440 when the Duke of Brittany, Jean V, founded the church as a suitable place to hold the John the Baptist relic (see note below). This relic reputedly has the power to restore sight. The church, fountain, double cemetery gate, funeral chapel and the cemetery and its wall are listed historical monuments.

== The enclos cross and nearby calvary ==
There is no grand calvary but there is a cross bearing the crucified Christ in the cemetery and a calvary nearby at Pen-ar-C'hra. The cross in the cemetery is 7 metres high and dates to 1877. The cross is inscribed

"MISSION DE 1877 0 VA JESUS TRUGAREZ KANT DEVEZ INDULJANSOU"

There are archival notes stating that the cross was transported from Quimper. At Pen-ar-C'hra, near the enclos, there is a fountain and calvary commemorating the relic of John the Baptist's finger. The legend has it that a young archer in the service of a local knight was staying at Saint-Jean-de-Day in Normandy when he was shown the relic, became obsessed with it and wanted to keep it. He was thrown into prison for sorcery by the local community but woke up by a fountain in Traon-Mériadec, the ancient name for Saint-Jean-du-Doigt. In this way the relic came to Saint-Jean-du-Doigt and the fountain and calvary commemorates these events. The calvary, erected in 1757, has a sculpture of John the Baptist

== The entrance to the enclos ==
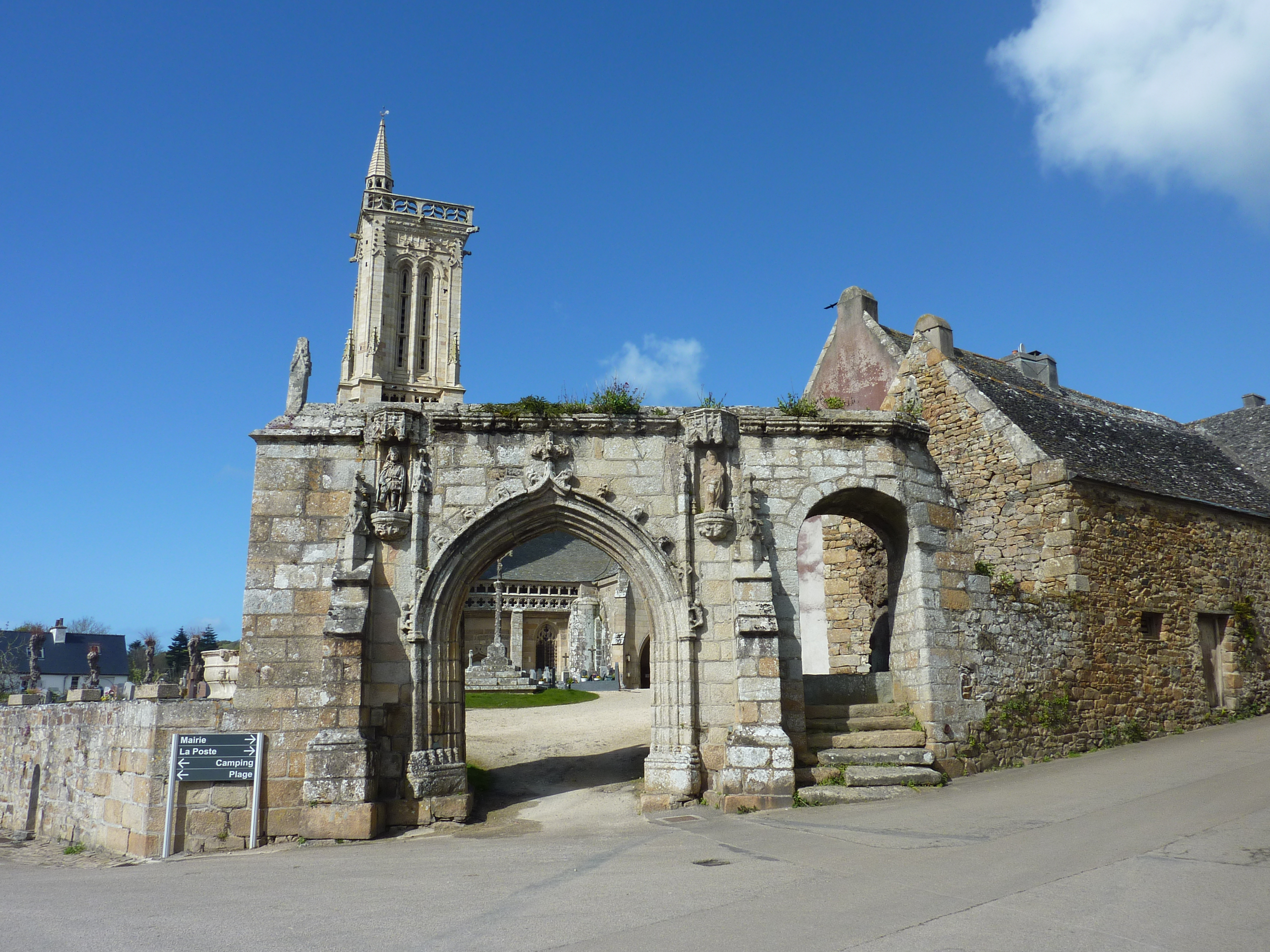
The triumphal arch at Saint-Jean-du-Doigt with access stairs on the right. Note the pinnacled buttresses and the niched statues of Saints John and Roch. The statue of Saint Roch is carved from wood

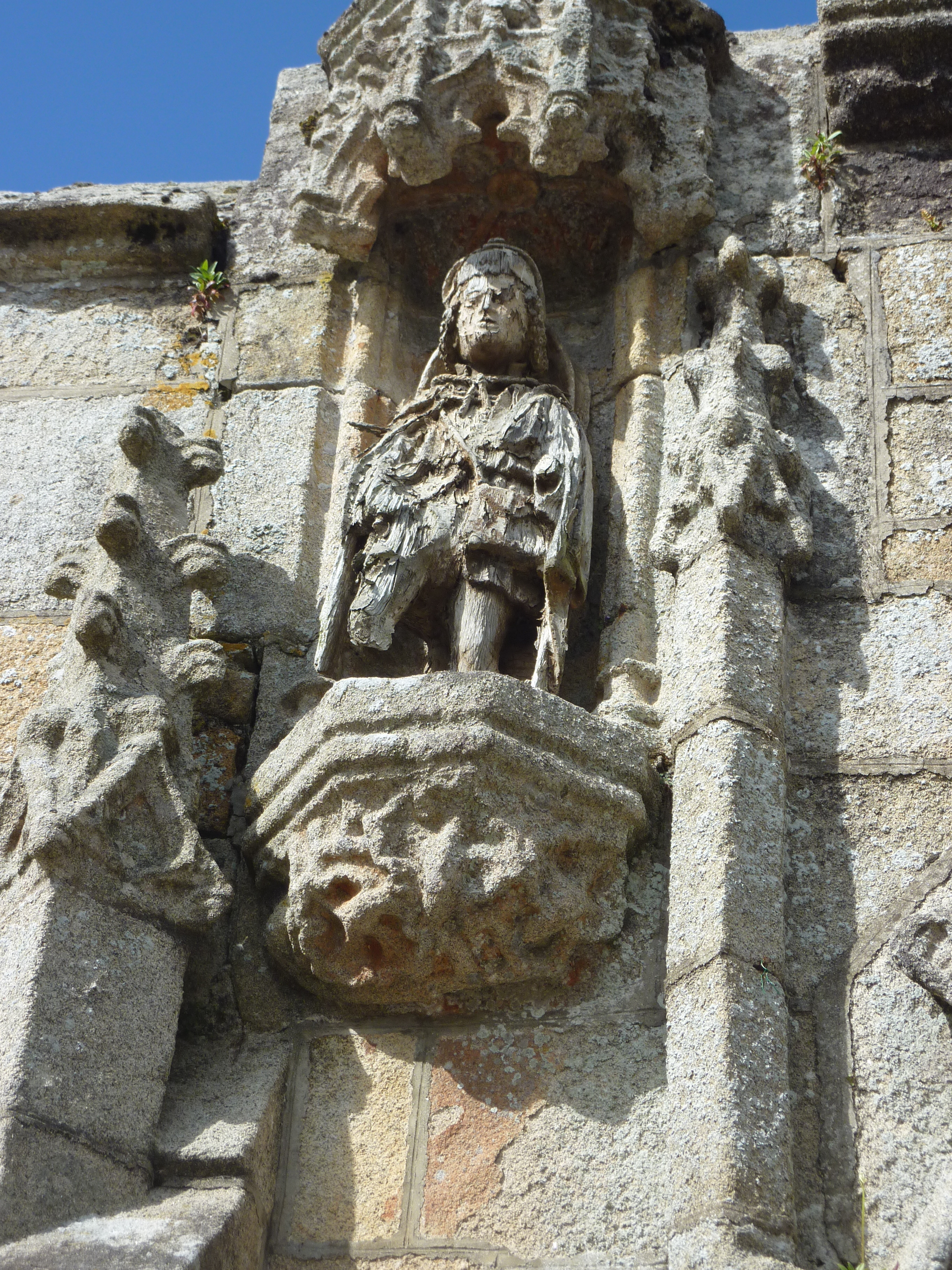
The wooden statue of Saint Roch

The Saint-Jean-du-Doigt Parish close is accessed through a Triumphal arch (arc de triomphe) designed by Le Taillanter in 1584. Le Taillanter had designed the tower of Plougasnou's church. Through this entrance you leave the secular world behind and enter the sacred world represented by the church. It is an ornate structure with two pinnacled buttresses and two niches each containing a dais on which are sculptures of John the Evangelist on the right and Saint Roch on the left. These have, not surprisingly, deteriorated quite badly. On the right hand side of the arch there is another entrance with a few stairs allowing access for pedestrians.

== Fountain ==
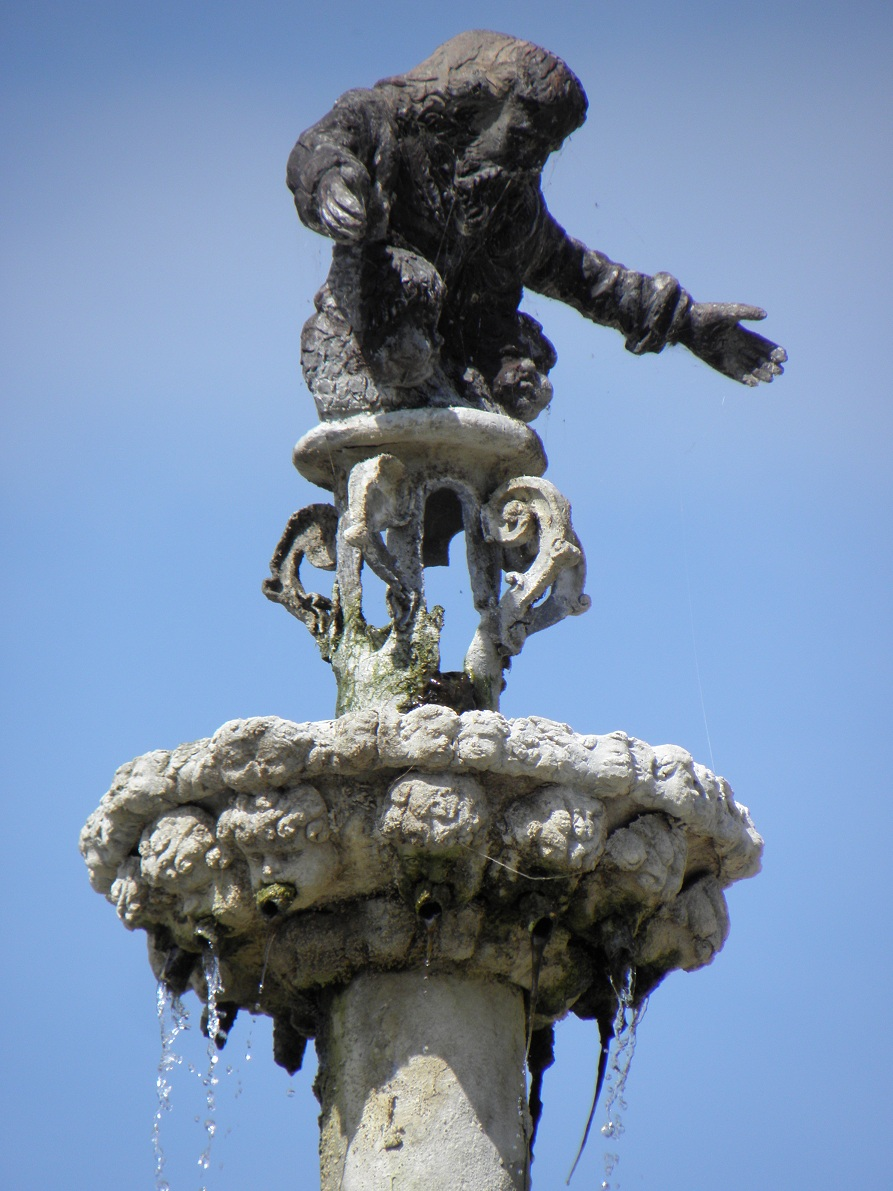
The Holy Father spreads out his arms to bless his son who is being baptized by John the Baptist. Water flows from a circle of angel's head running around the basin

Outside the church is a fine fountain carved from Kersanton stone and dating to 1691. The fountain was the work of the Morlaix mason Jacques Lespaignol and the architect Yves Lageat. A central pillar supports three tiers of circular basins which reduce in size as they reach the fountain's summit and from these basins water flows from the mouths of the heads of small angels arranged around the basin's rims. At the top the Holy Father blesses his son whom John the Baptist is baptizing. These statues are made from lead.

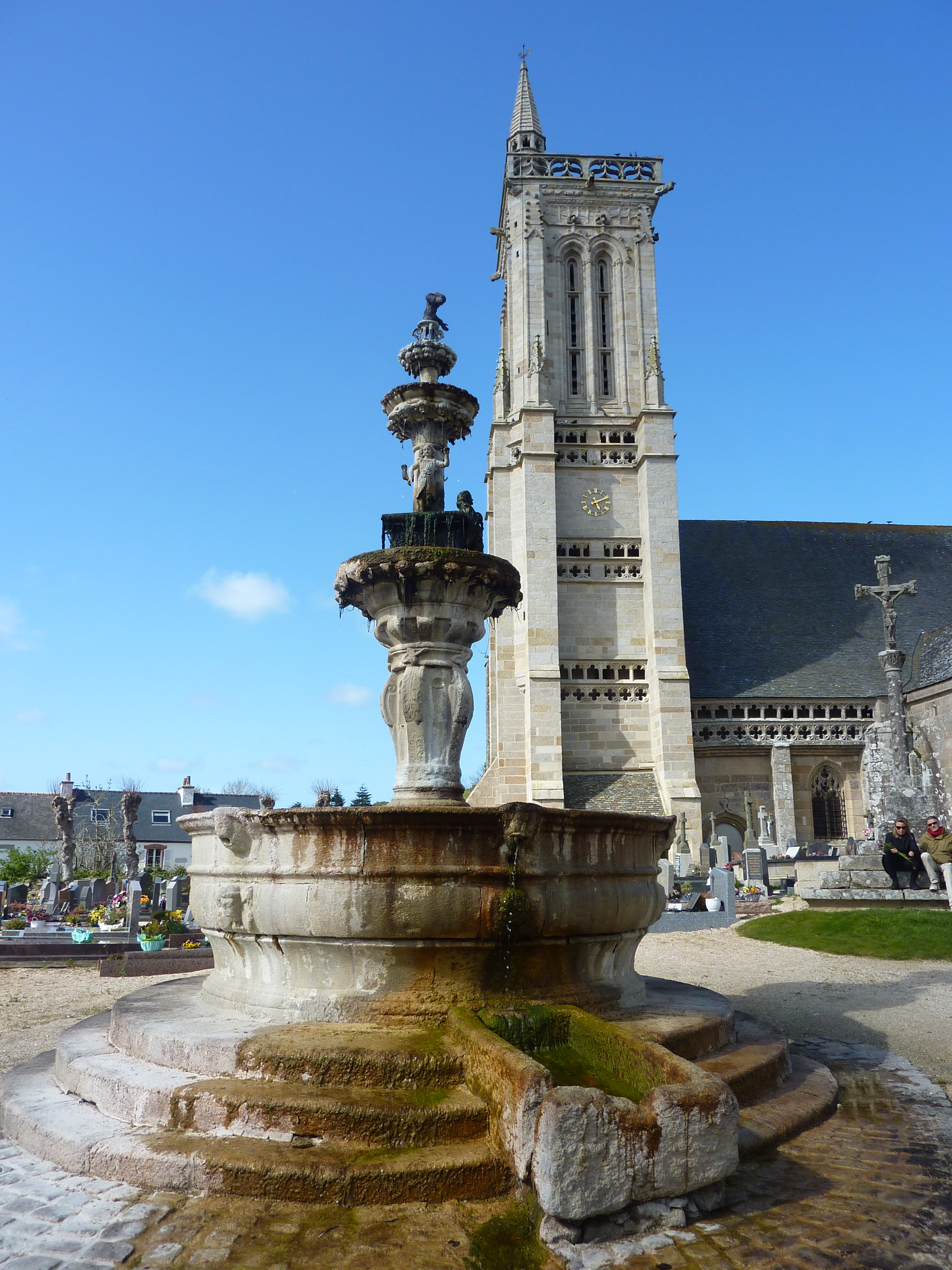
The 1691 fountain in front of the church at Saint-Jean-du-Doigt

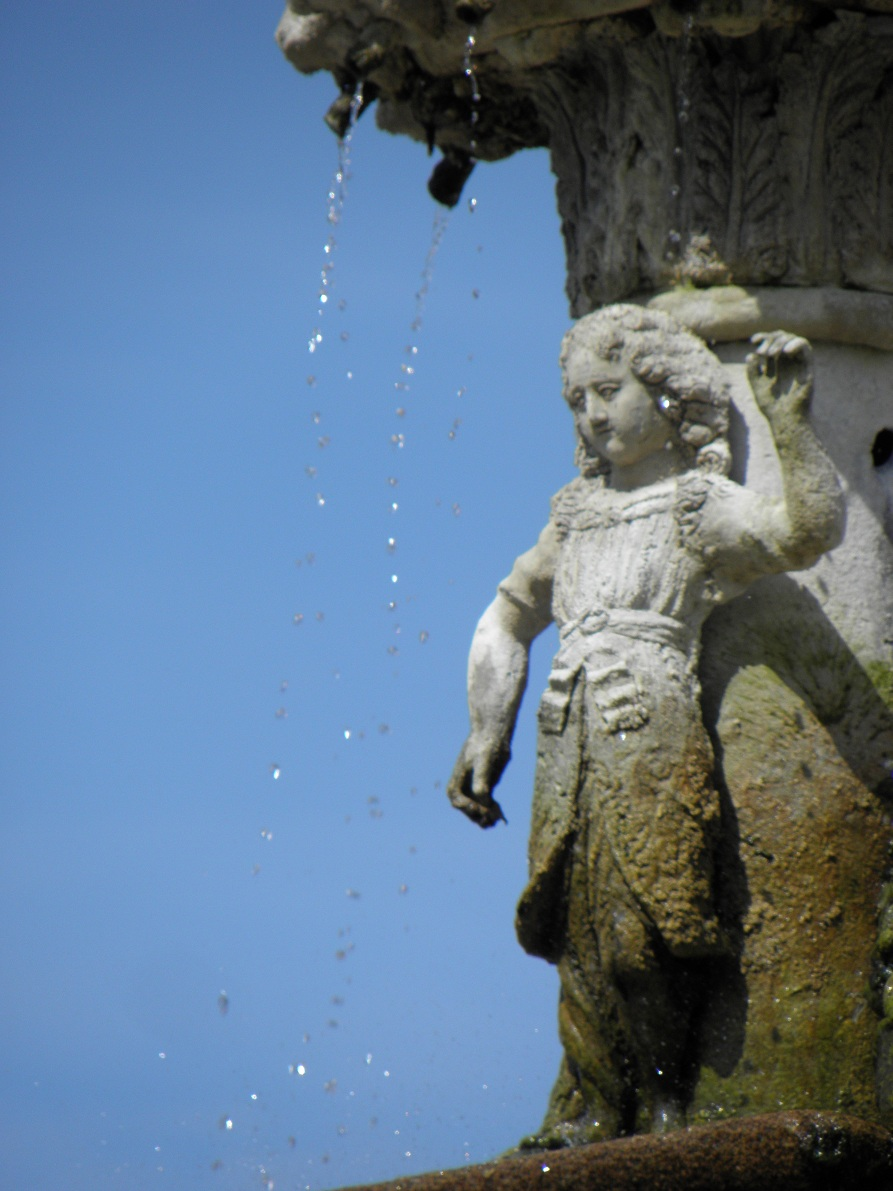
Statue below one of the circular basins

== The church spire ==
The church has lost its spire, built on the top of the tower in 1513. It had been 22 metres high and covered with lead tiles. It had been restored in 1571 but was hit by lightning on several occasions over the years and was totally destroyed in 1925. It was never rebuilt.

== South porch ==
Over the church's south porch there is an archive. Outside the porch are two stoups and a window accessing to the archive. The coats of arms on the gable were chiseled away during the French revolution. Apart from the stoups, there is a statue of John the Baptist.

== The church interior ==
The Gothic "Chapelle de l'Isle" dates to between 1507 and 1513. The church has two octagonal fonts dating to the 16th century. The stained glass windows are modern and are by the Orléans's artist Louis-René Petit, and were unveiled by the Bishop of Quimper on 24 June 1990. They depict scenes representing Christ's baptism and Transfiguration in the large chevet window, the Tree of Jesse for the window in the "Chapelle de l'Isle", and the Apocalypse in the bay by the south porch. The church holds several "Enfeus", these being fireplace-like structures which indicate the presence of tombs behind the wall where they appear. The church has a fine oratory and, apart from John the Baptist's finger, possesses a silver reliquary dating to the 16th century said to contain the head of Saint Mériadec and another said to contain the arm of Saint Maudet. On 5 November 1955, the church suffered a major fire and several priceless works of Breton art were lost, including the altarpiece on the main altar dating to 1670 and the altarpieces by Lespaignol dedicated to Saint Mériadec and Saint Elizabeth dating to 1723. A rood screen ("poutre de gloire") dating to 1571 was also lost.

== The "Maison du Government" or the ""Grande Maison de Saint-Jean" ==
This building is part of the enclos and dates to between 1562 and 1572. It served as the residence of the governor of the Chapelle saint-Jean-Baptiste.

== Note ==
It is recorded that in around 1418 a young man from Plougasnou, possibly an archer, was shown what was said to be the index finger of John the Baptist and became devoted to it. The finger was kept in the church of Saint-Jean-de-Daye. The finger had been given by the Patriarch of Jerusalem to Saint Tècle at the time of the crusades and the saint had had the church of Saint-Jean-de-Daye built. The young archer had caused the relic to be brought to Brittany and the Duke, Jean V, presented a reliquary to hold the finger to a chapel in Saint-Jean-du-Doigt dedicated to Saint Mériadec. Over the succeeding years so many pilgrims visited the chapel that it was decided to replace the chapel with a larger church. Thus was born the Eglise Saint Jean-Baptiste in Saint-Jean-du-Doigt.

== Gallery of images ==
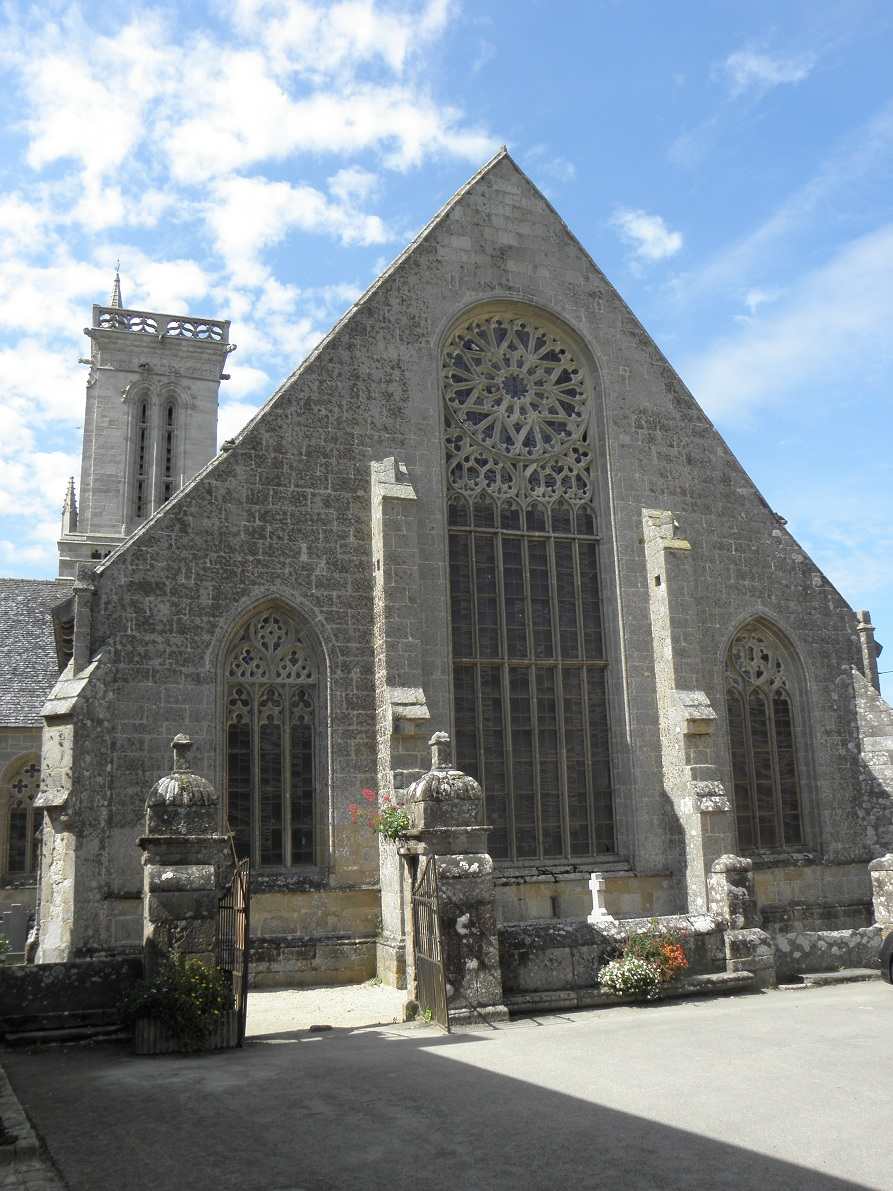
The Saint-Jean-du-Doigt chevet

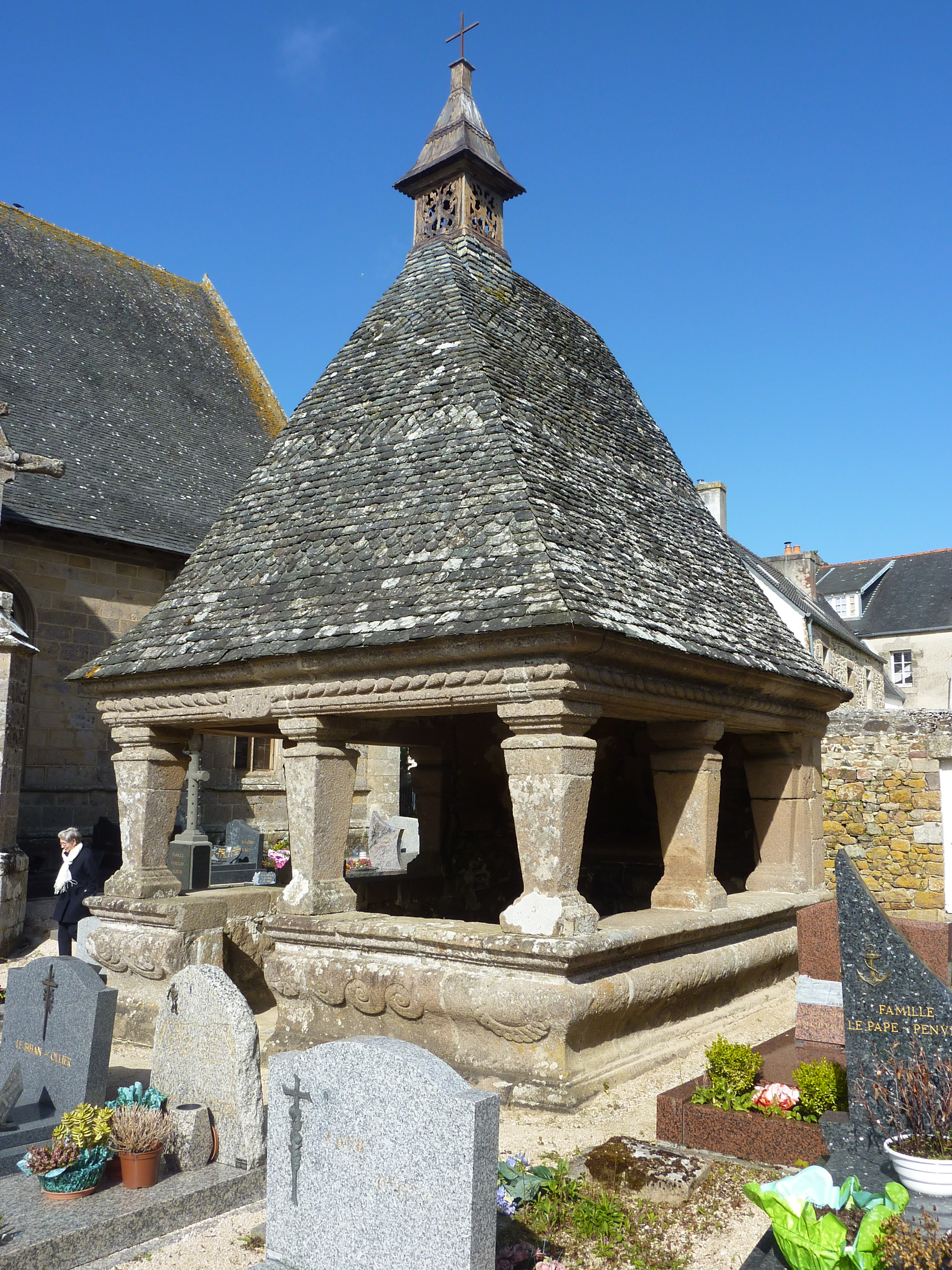
The 1577 "Oratoire du Sacre".

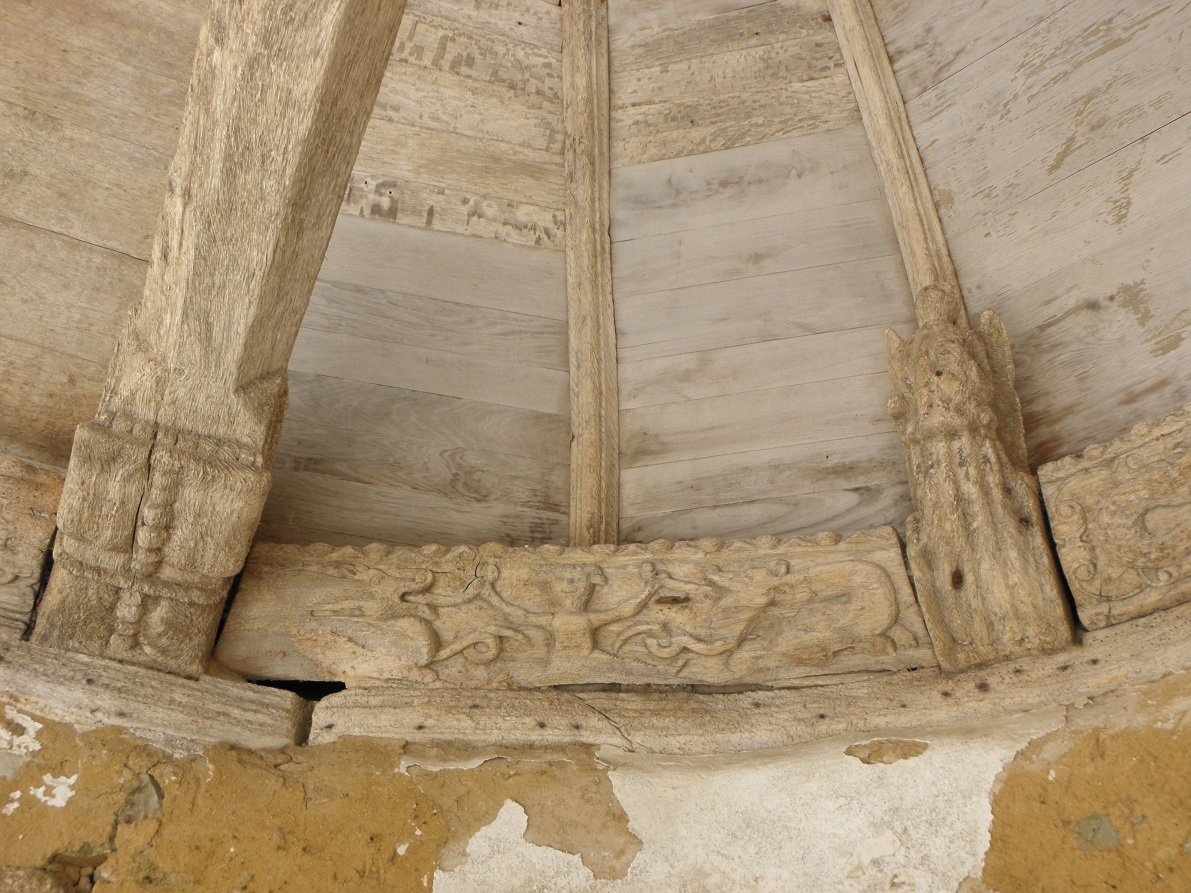
Part of the frieze in the "Oratoire du Sacre"

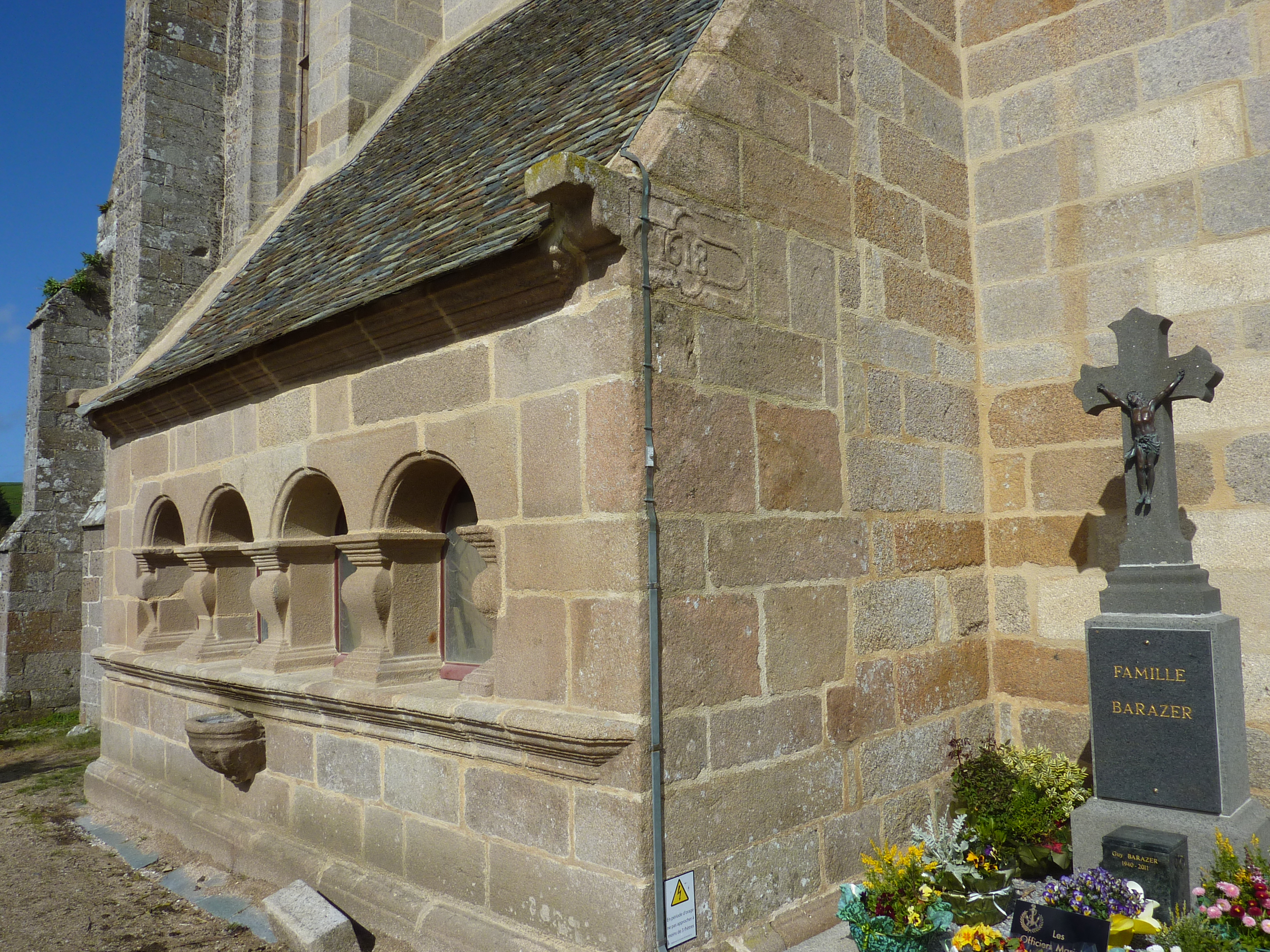
One of the two ossuaries at Saint-Jean-du-Doigt.

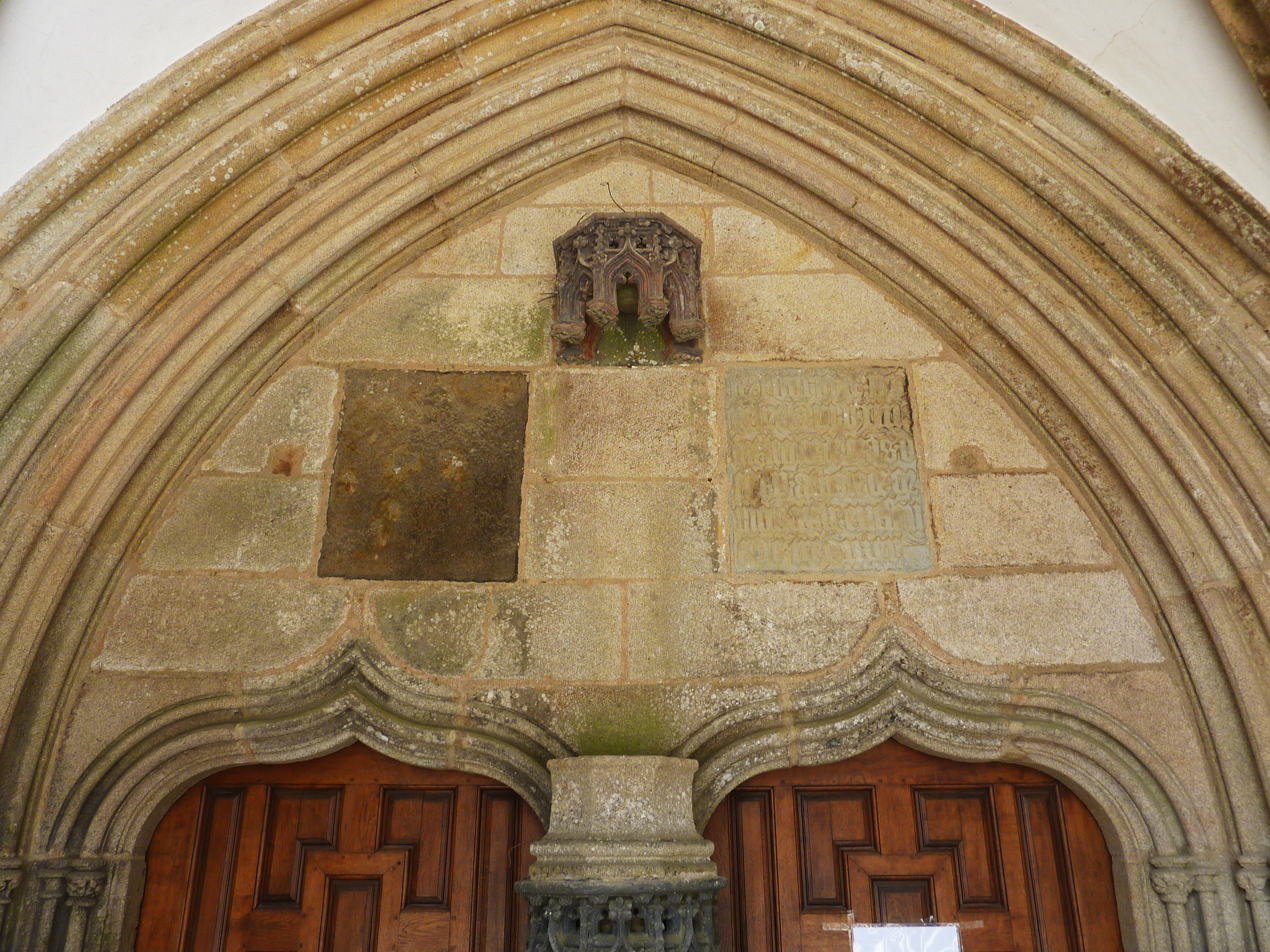
Two doors in the porch allowing access to the church

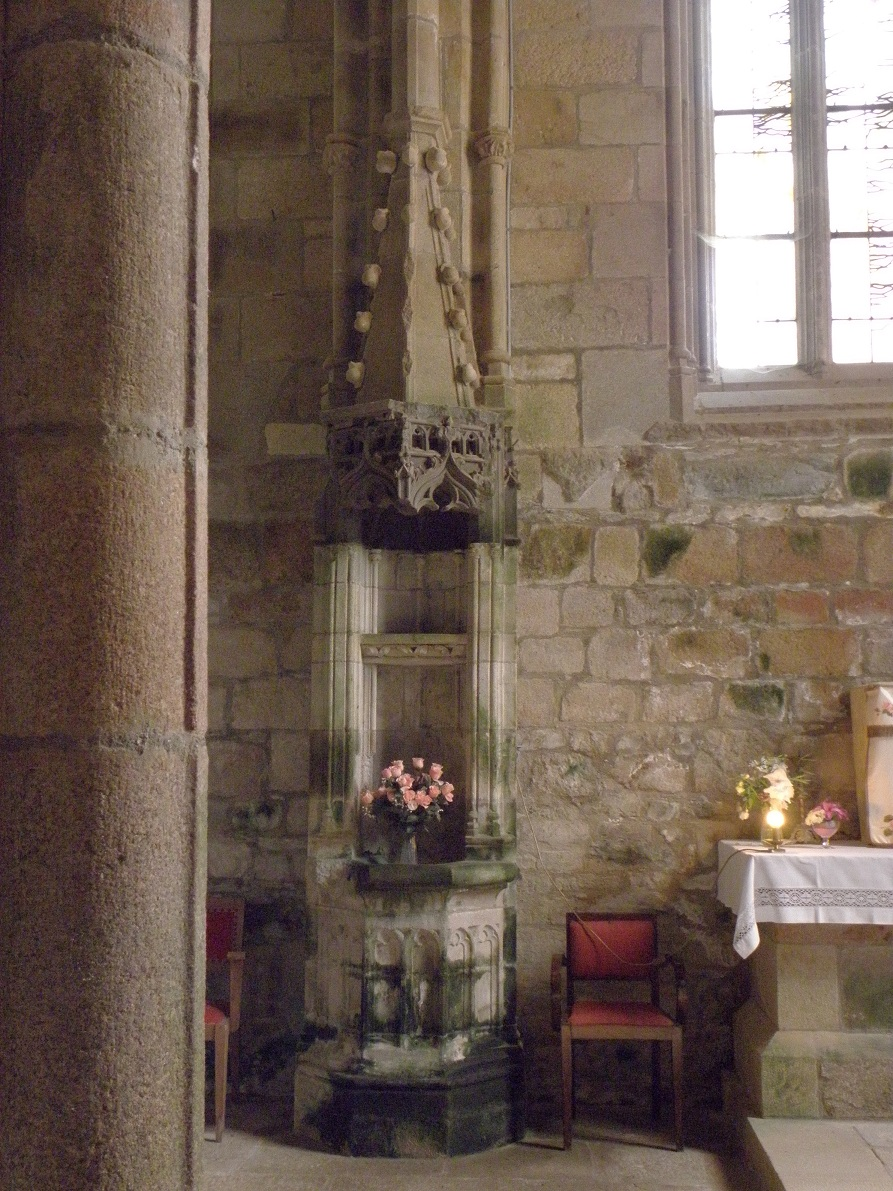
An ornate Gothic credence in the Saint-Jean-du-Doigt church

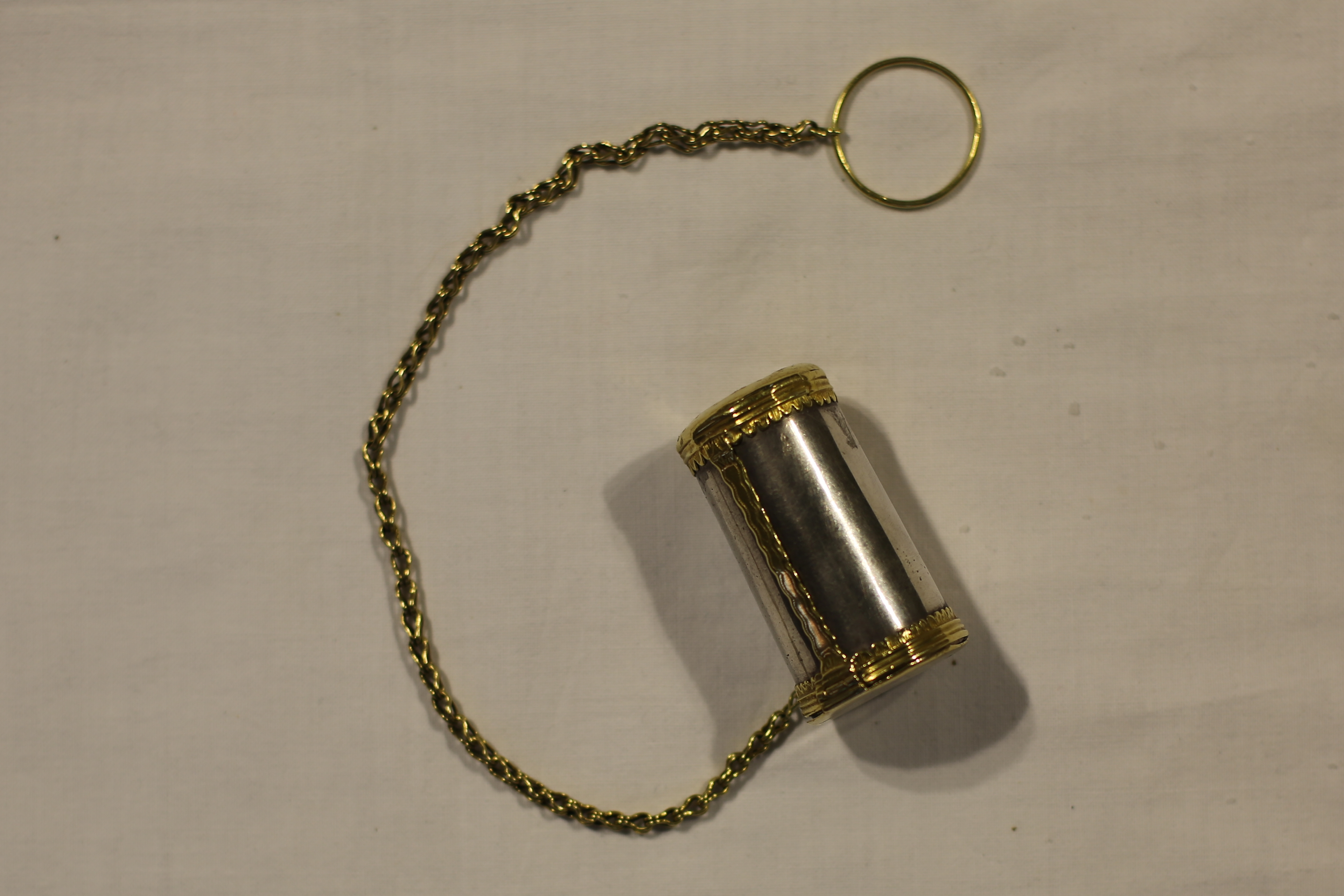
The reliquary containing John the Baptist's index finger

== See also ==
- Plounéour-Ménez Parish close
- Plourin-lès-Morlaix Parish close
