= Plourin-lès-Morlaix Parish close =

Coordinates: 48.5359°N 3.7897°W

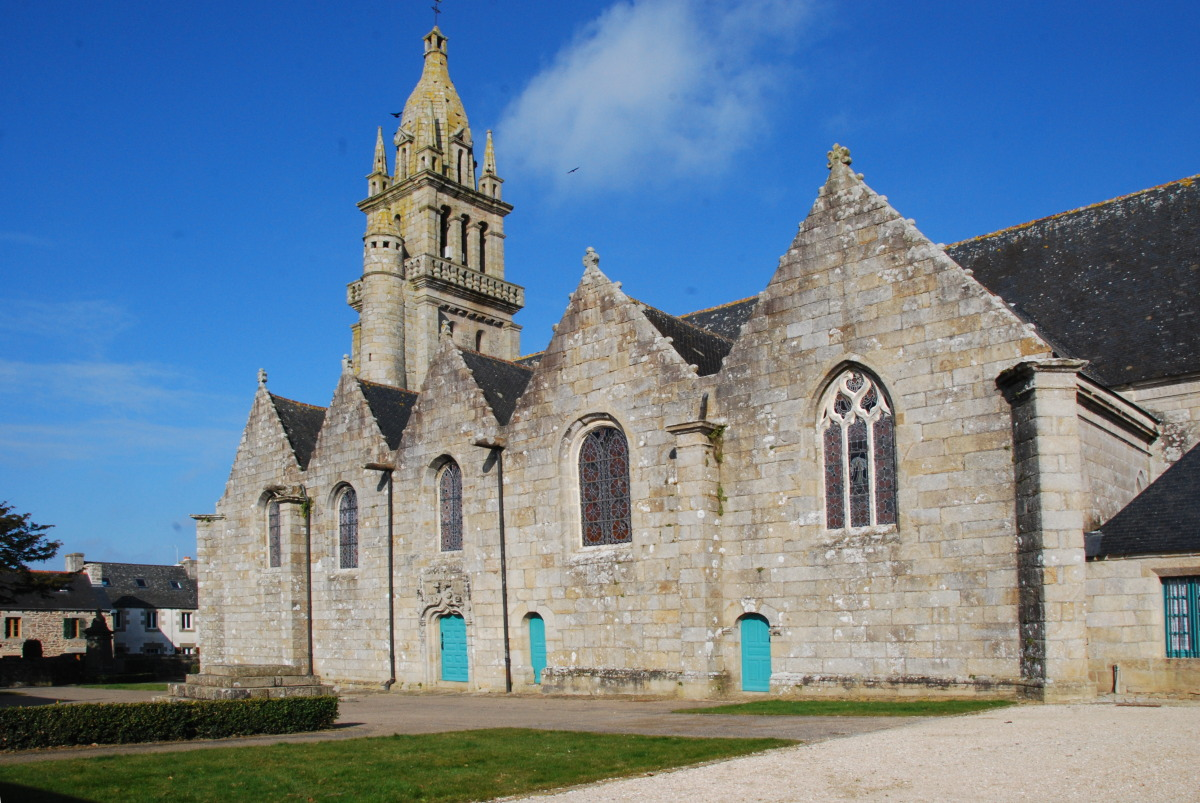
Plourin lès Morlaix church

The Plourin-lès-Morlaix Parish close (Enclos paroissial) is located at Plourin-lès-Morlaix in the arrondissement of Morlaix in Brittany in north-western France. The Enclos paroissial comprises the Notre-Dame church, a cemetery, ossuary and retaining wall. The church is a listed historical monument since 1932.

The Notre-Dame church dates to the end of the 17th century and the beginning of the 18th century, replacing an earlier Gothic-style church under Saint Peter's patronage. The chevet, windows and enfeu of this earlier building were retained. The bell tower dates to 1728 and is flanked by a round tower. Inside the church are ten chapels built by some of the rich members of the parish. One such family was the Coatanscours whose escutcheon decorates one of the church's pillars. This enclos paroissial is one of several in the Morlaix area including those at Saint-Thégonnec, Plougonven, Plounéour-Ménez and Saint-Jean-du-Doigt.

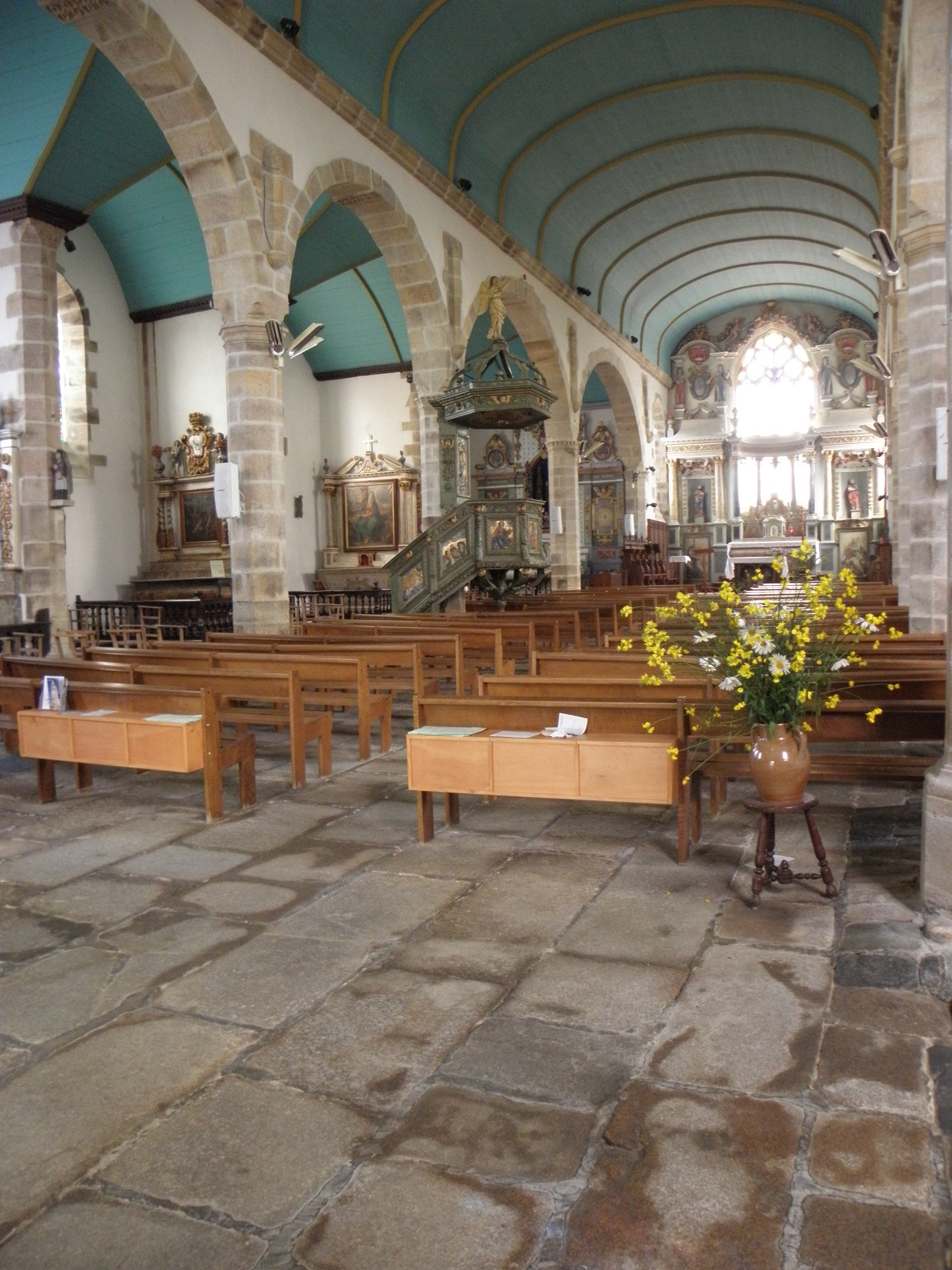
View of left side of nave with pulpit

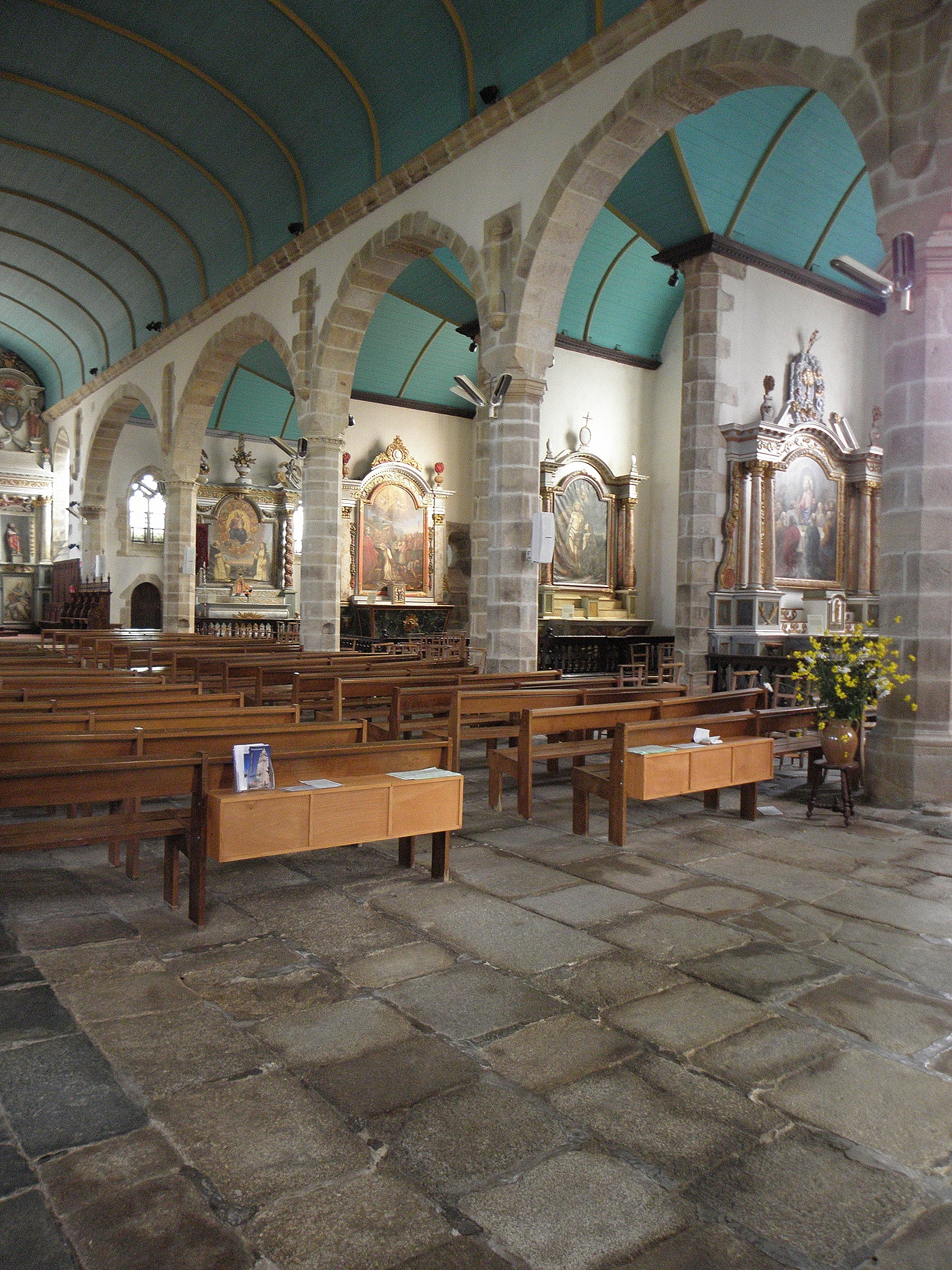
View of side chapels on the right side of the nave

== The ossuary ==
The ossuary chapel was dedicated to Saint Mathurin and dates to the 17th century. Saint Mathurin was particularly sought out by those suffering from head pains and despondency. It has been restored and contains six kersanton statues by Roland Doré thought to have been part of the original enclos calvary destroyed at the time of the French revolution. Further vestiges of this calvary decorate the enclosure walls including a piéta and a sculpture depicting the flight of Joseph, Mary and Jesus into Egypt.

== Chapels and altarpieces ==
The church has side-chapels and altarpieces including those described below.

=== The Saint Philomena chapel ===
In this chapel in the centre of the altarpiece is an oil painting depicting the martyrdom of a young woman. On the wall opposite is a painting entitled "Ecce Homo" ("Behold the man") echoing the words of Pontius Pilate when describing Jesus at that moment when, humiliated and ridiculed, he stands in purple robe and wearing a crown of thorns to be led off to his death.

=== The Saint Sebastian chapel ===
The altarpiece here has an oil painting depicting Saint Sebastian's martyrdom. On the wall there is a statue of the saint in wood.

=== The chapel of the Eucharist ===
The altarpiece has an oil painting depicting the Last Supper. Beneath the painting is a tabernacle on which there is an image of Jesus carrying a cross and wearing a shroud and a crown of thorns whilst at the very top of the altarpiece is a depiction of the resurrected Christ.

=== The chapel of the Virgin Mary ===
Above the altarpiece is a depiction of the Tree of Jesse.

=== The chapel of the "Vierge des douleurs ===
This chapel has a painting by Edmond Puyo a painter from Morlaix. The Virgin Mary wears a green costume rather than the traditional blue garment. At her feet are some of the instruments of the passion. On the wall is carving of Christ by Roland Doré (sculptor) although it is much damaged. There is also a pietà in polychromed wood.

=== The chapel of Saint Etienne ===
The altarpiece has twisted columns on either side of a painting by Quéguiner depicting the stoning to death of Saint Etienne. On the wall there is a wooden carving of John the Evangelist.

=== The chapel of Saint Yves ===
Yves was the bishop of Tréquier and in the chapel is a painting of the saint settling a dispute between rich and poor. A Roland Doré back to back statue of Yves and a female saint is on display, part of the calvary mentioned earlier.

=== The John the Baptist chapel ===
The altarpiece is a complete work of sculpture representing Jesus' baptism. On the wall are some painted panels discovered during the restoration.

==== The baptistry ====
On the font are carvings of seven heads wearing 15th-century headwear. The baldachin is in the Renaissance style and bears the coat of arms of the Coatanscour family. A dove is carved at the very top. On a nearby pillar is an oak statue depicting Saint Fiacre.

==== The choir ====
This features a classical altarpiece with niches containing statues of Saints Peter and Paul. Two panels depict Moses and Aaron.

=== The chapel of Saint Anne ===
In the centre of the altarpiece is an oak carving of Saint Barbara whilst on the wall there is a Roland Doré statue of Saint Anne with the Virgin Mary and child. There is also a wood carving depicting Saint Marguerite and a dragon. Facing the altar is a carving of Christ on the cross and the remains of a frieze (sablière) discovered during restoration work.

==== The confessional ====
The church has a fine wooden confessional and decorated stalls.

==== The pulpit ====
The stairway is decorated with bas-relief panels depicting the Annunciation and the Nativity and the pulpit itself has depictions of the four Evangelists. At the rear is a depiction of the Virgin Mary's Assumption.

=== The Rosary chapel ===
The baroque altarpiece in this chapel comprises a painting showing Saint Dominic and Saint Catherine of Siena looking up to the Virgin Mary, who holds the Rosary they have given her. The image of the Virgin Mary with the infant Jesus is surrounded by fifteen medallions depicting scenes from the life of Jesus. The invention of the rosary has traditionally been attributed to Dominic with its sections representing fifteen prayers written by the saint.

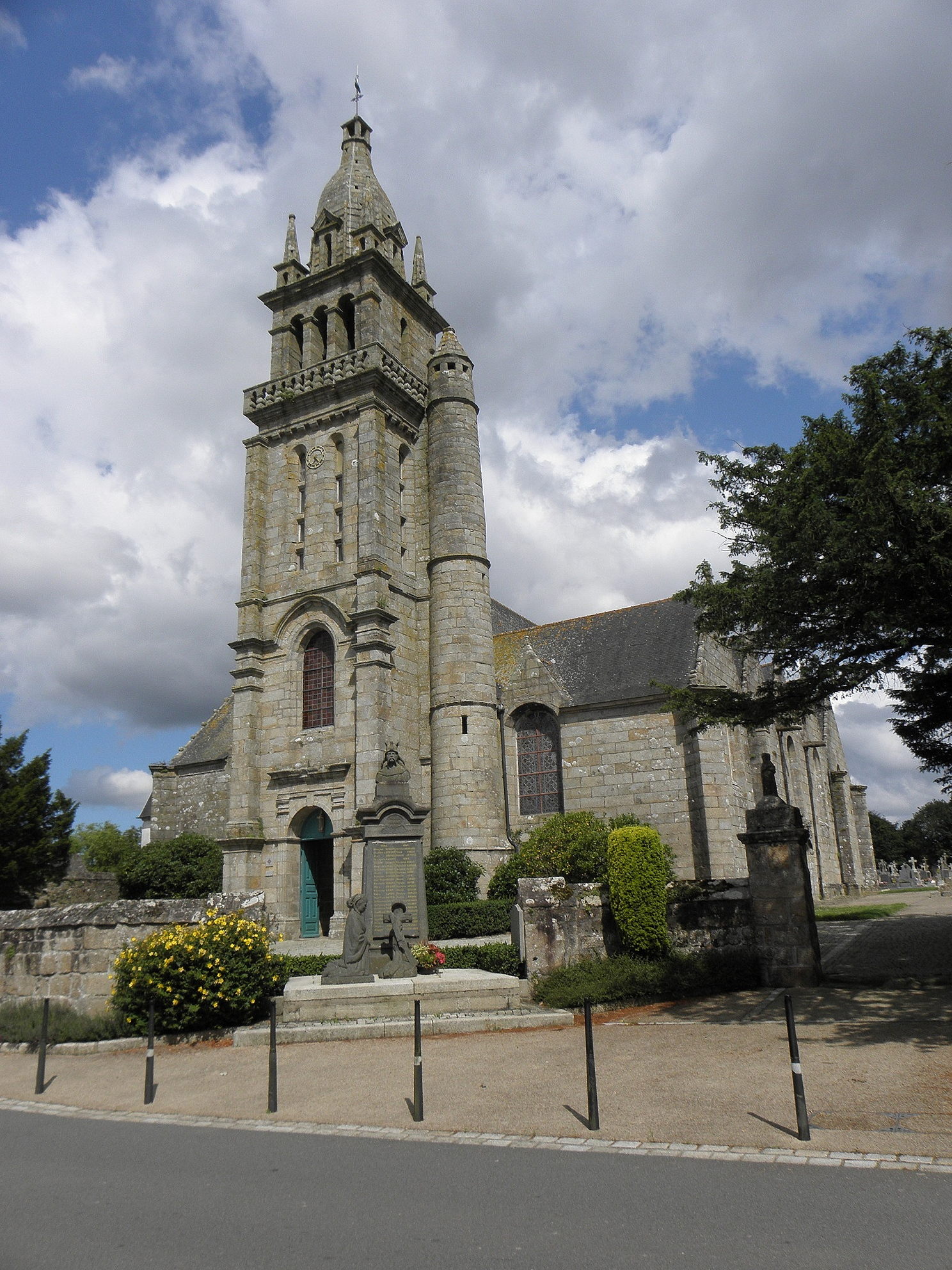
A view of the Église Notre-Dame bell-tower. Note the round tower next to the bell-tower. We can also see the four pinnacles at the top of the bell-tower and the spire. Note the war memorial in front of the building

== See also ==
- Plounéour-Ménez Parish close
