= Plounéour-Ménez =

Plounéour-Ménez Plouneour-Menez
- Commune
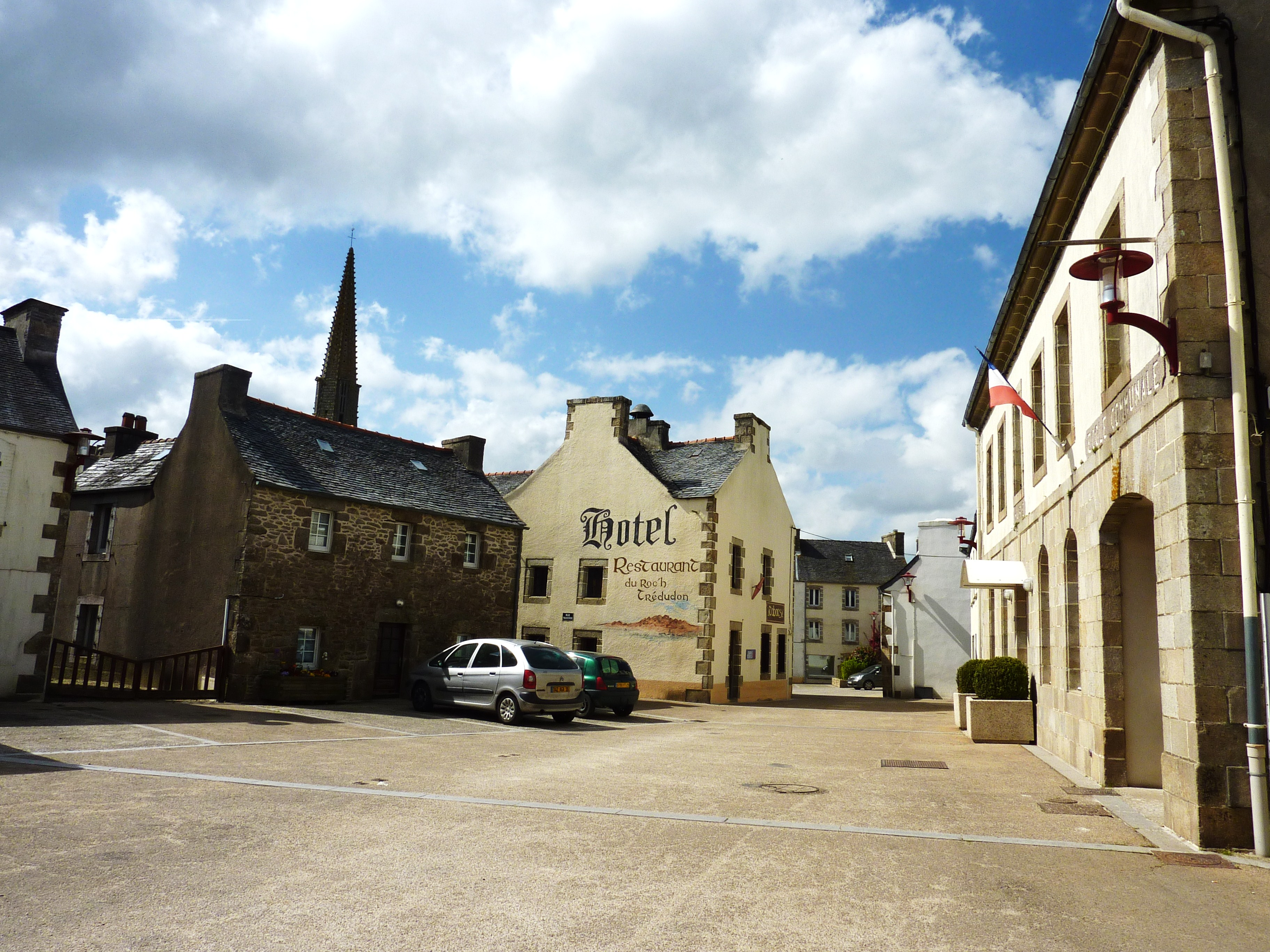
- The town hall square, in Plounéour-Ménez
- Location of Plounéour-Ménez
- Location within France Location within Brittany
- Coordinates: 48°26′24″N 3°53′23″W
- Country: France
- Region: Brittany
- Department: Finistère
- Arrondissement: Morlaix
- Canton: Morlaix
- Intercommunality: Morlaix Communauté

Government
  - Mayor (2020–2026): Sébastien Marie
- Area^{1}: 51.74 km^{2} (19.98 sq mi)
- Highest elevation: 387 m (1,270 ft)
- Lowest elevation: 124 m (407 ft)
- Population (2023): 1,297
  - Density: 25.07/km^{2} (64.92/sq mi)
- Time zone: UTC+01:00 (CET)
  - Summer (DST): UTC+02:00 (CEST)
- INSEE/Postal code: 29202 /29410
- ^{1} French Land Register data, which excludes lakes, ponds, glaciers > 1 km^{2} (0.386 sq mi or 247 acres) and river estuaries.

Plounéour-Ménez (French pronunciation: [pluneuʁ menɛs]; Breton: Plouneour-Menez) is a commune in the Finistère department of Brittany in north-western France.

== Population ==
Historical population
Year	Pop.	±% p.a.
1968	1,396	—
1975	1,208	−2.05%
1982	1,211	+0.04%
1990	1,100	−1.19%
1999	1,165	+0.64%
2007	1,186	+0.22%
2012	1,300	+1.85%
2017	1,246	−0.84%
2023	1,297	+0.67%
Source: INSEE

Inhabitants of Plounéour-Ménez are called in French Énéouriens.

== See also ==
- Communes of the Finistère department
- Parc naturel régional d'Armorique
- Plounéour-Ménez Parish close
- Roc'h Trevezel, the second peak of the Breton part of the Armorican Massif in the Monts d'Arrée, located in the commune
- Roland Doré sculptor, sculpture in local church
