= Plourin-lès-Morlaix =

- Commune
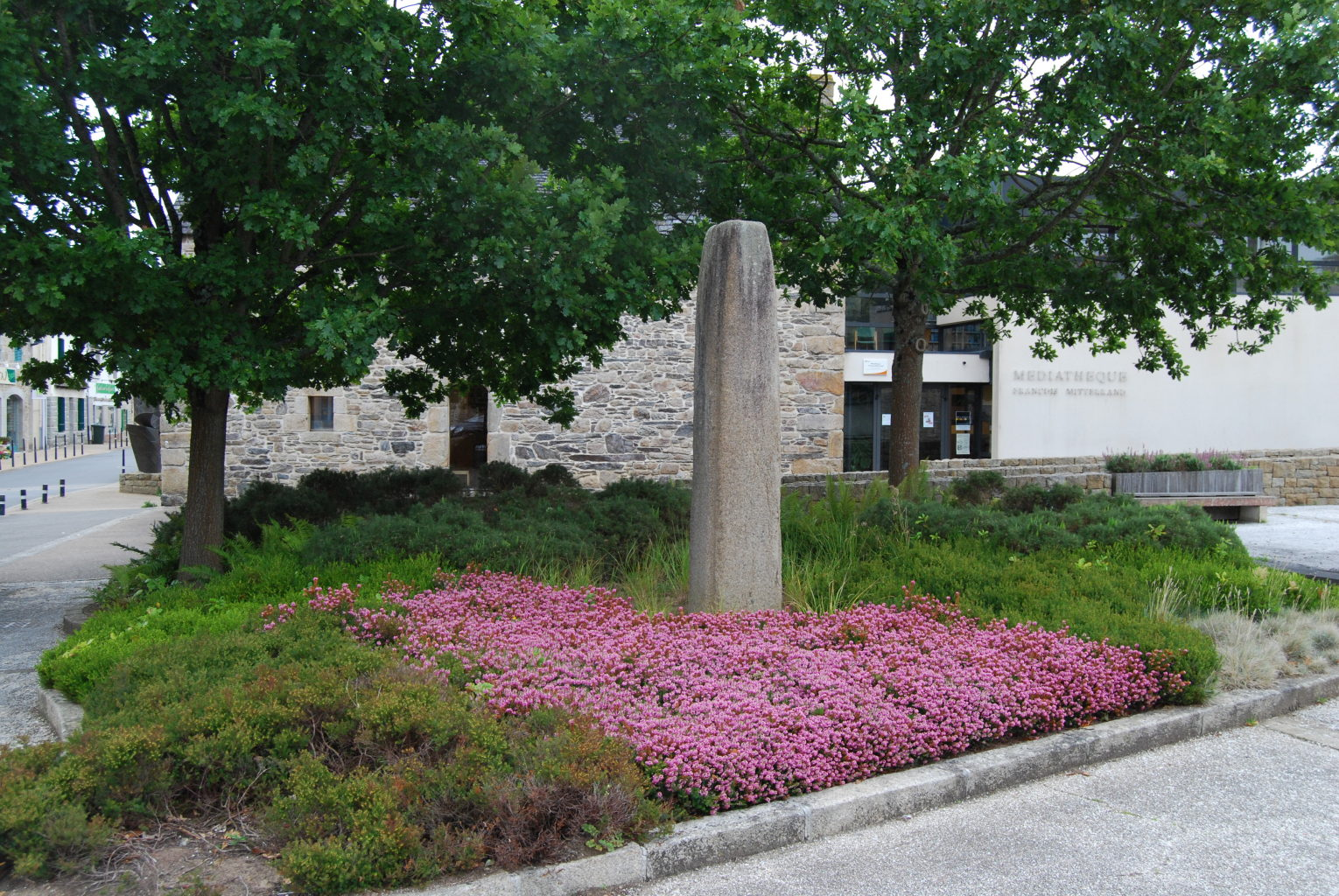
- Plourin Menhir : Once a milestone on the Roman road.
- Location of Plourin-lès-Morlaix
- Location within France Location within Brittany
- Coordinates: 48°32′07″N 3°47′22″W
- Country: France
- Region: Brittany
- Department: Finistère
- Arrondissement: Morlaix
- Canton: Plouigneau
- Intercommunality: Morlaix Communauté

Government
  - Mayor (2020–2026): Guy Pennec
- Area^{1}: 40.92 km^{2} (15.80 sq mi)
- Highest elevation: 242 m (794 ft)
- Lowest elevation: 8 m (26 ft)
- Population (2023): 4,548
  - Density: 111.1/km^{2} (287.9/sq mi)
- Time zone: UTC+01:00 (CET)
  - Summer (DST): UTC+02:00 (CEST)
- INSEE/Postal code: 29207 /29600
- ^{1} French Land Register data, which excludes lakes, ponds, glaciers > 1 km^{2} (0.386 sq mi or 247 acres) and river estuaries.

Plourin-lès-Morlaix (French pronunciation: [pluʁɛ̃ lɛ mɔʁlɛ], literally Plourin near Morlaix; Breton: Plourin-Montroulez) is a commune in the Finistère department of Brittany in north-western France. It lies within the arrondissement of Morlaix.

== Population ==
Inhabitants of Plourin-lès-Morlaix are called in French Plourinois.

Historical population

Year	Pop.	±% p.a.
1793	2,230	—
1800	1,860	−2.56%
1806	2,168	+2.59%
1821	2,720	+1.52%
1831	3,020	+1.05%
1836	3,065	+0.30%
1841	3,070	+0.03%
1846	3,115	+0.29%
1851	3,121	+0.04%
1856	3,013	−0.70%
1861	3,145	+0.86%
1866	3,218	+0.46%
1872	3,109	−0.57%
1876	3,125	+0.13%
1881	2,988	−0.89%
1886	3,007	+0.13%
1891	2,900	−0.72%
1896	2,847	−0.37%
1901	2,718	−0.92%

Year	Pop.	±% p.a.
1906	2,736	+0.13%
1911	2,637	−0.73%
1921	2,420	−0.86%
1926	2,364	−0.47%
1931	2,219	−1.26%
1936	2,192	−0.24%
1946	2,111	−0.38%
1954	2,002	−0.66%
1962	2,008	+0.04%
1968	2,348	+2.64%
1975	3,649	+6.50%
1982	4,311	+2.41%
1990	4,176	−0.40%
1999	4,250	+0.20%
2007	4,532	+0.81%
2012	4,295	−1.07%
2017	4,457	+0.74%
2023	4,548	+0.34%

Source: EHESS and INSEE (1968-2023)

== Sights ==
=== The church ===
The Notre Dame church dates back to the late 17th to early 18th century. The taxus tree next to the entrance is supposed to be one thousand years old.

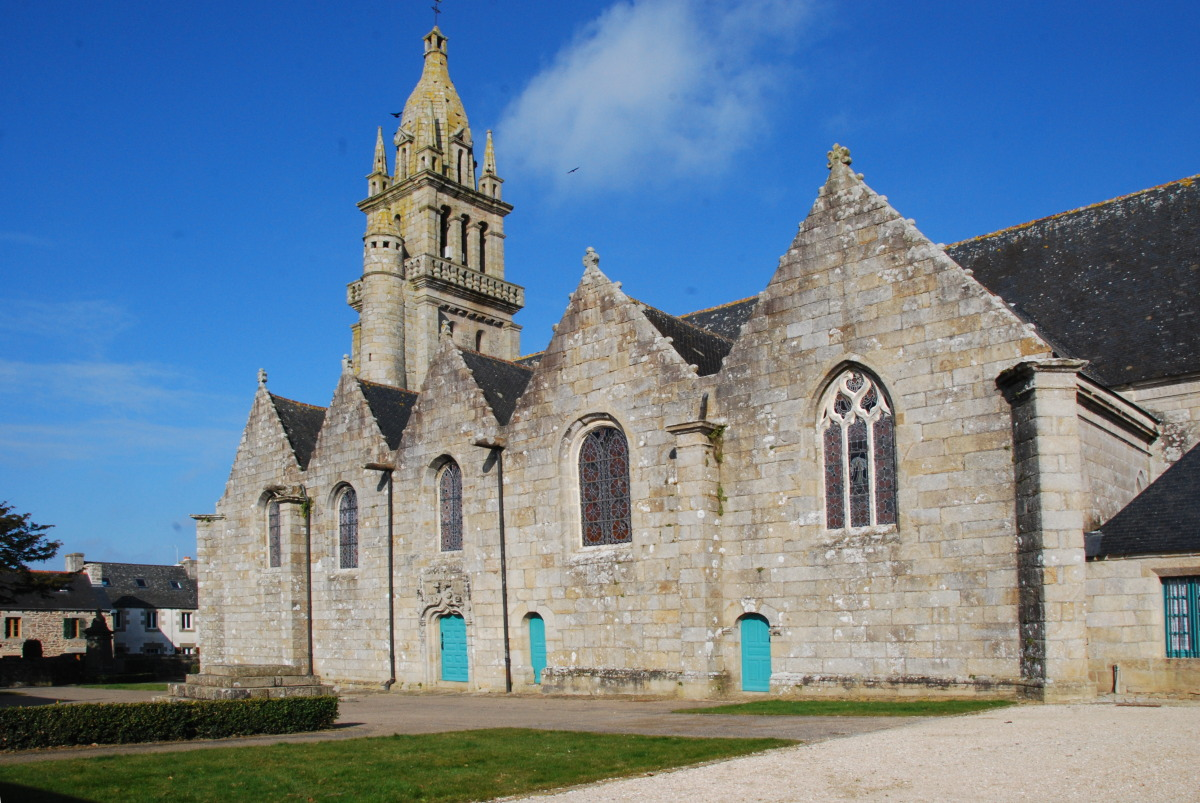
Plourin lès Morlaix church (Feb 2010)

== See also ==
- Communes of the Finistère department
- Roland Doré sculptor
- Plourin-lès-Morlaix Parish close
