= Roc'h Trevezel =

Mountain in France

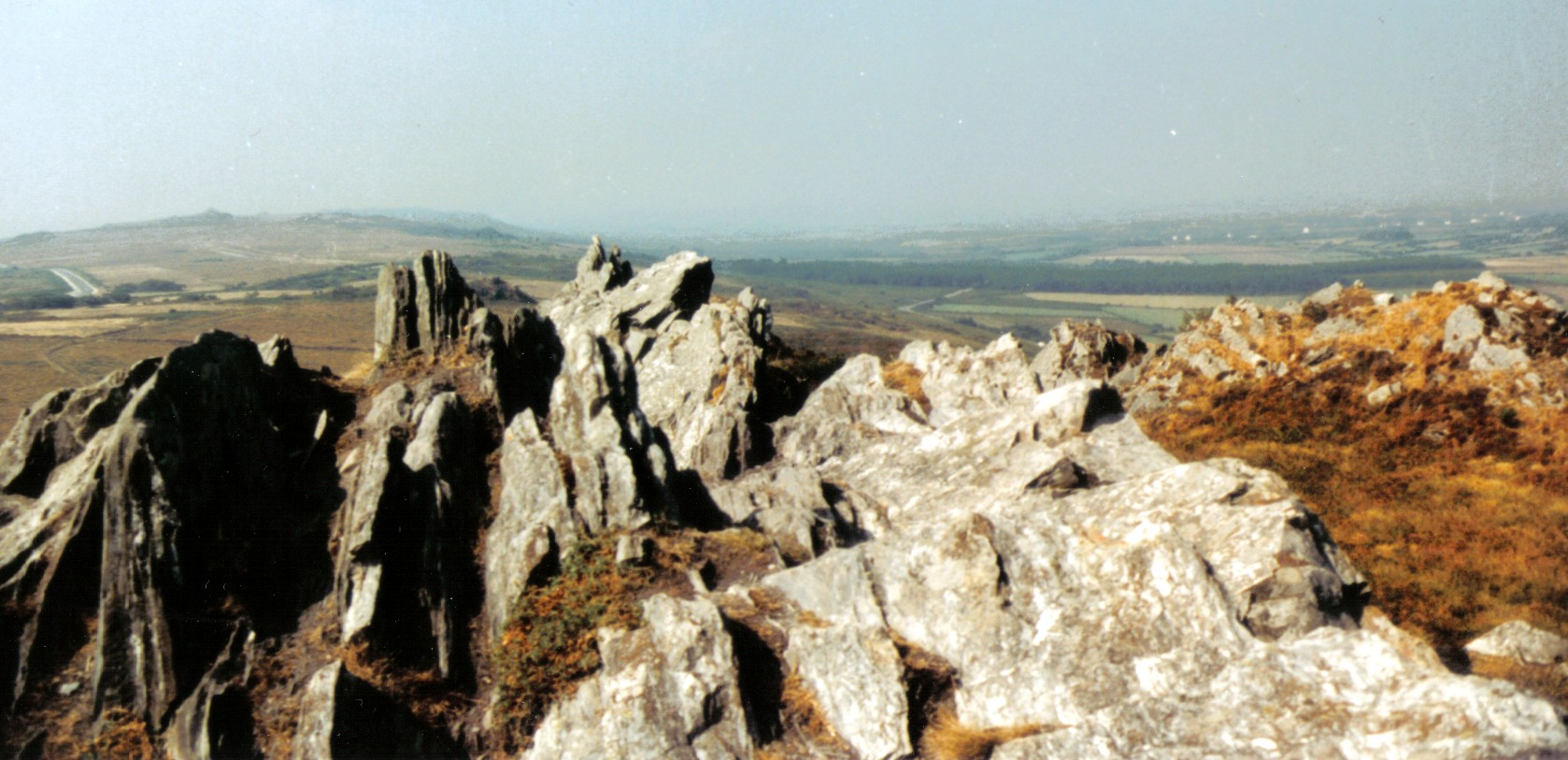
- Roc'h Trevezel in July 1991

Highest point
- Elevation: 384 m (1,260 ft)
- Coordinates: 48°24′36″N 03°54′27″W

Geography
- Location within France
- Location: Finistère, France
- Parent range: Monts d'Arrée

Roc'h Trevezel is the second peak of the Breton part of the Armorican Massif in the Monts d'Arrée. Just like the Signal of Toussaines, it reaches 384 metres (1,260 ft) in altitude. It is located in the commune of Plounéour-Ménez, near Roc'h Ruz, the highest point of the Monts d'Arrée in Brittany.

Roc'h Trevezel is the highest peak on the Paris–Brest–Paris bicycle route.
