= Monts d'Arrée =

Mountain range in France

Coordinates: 48°26′N 3°55′W

The Monts d'Arrée, (Menezioù Are or Menez Are in Breton) are an ancient mountain range in western Brittany, which forms part of the Armorican massif. Historically it marked the border of the regions of Cornouaille and Léon.

The highest elevation is 385m (1,283 ft) at Roc'h Ruz. Its topographic prominence is approximately 315m, its key col being 70m, north of Rennes.

Three other summits vie with Roc'h Ruz for the title of highest summit in Brittany: Tuchenn Kador, Roc'h Trevezel, and Roc'h Tredudon, all of which are mapped by the IGN as 385 metres.

The mounts constitute rocks dramatically emerging from the land, running north-east - south-west.

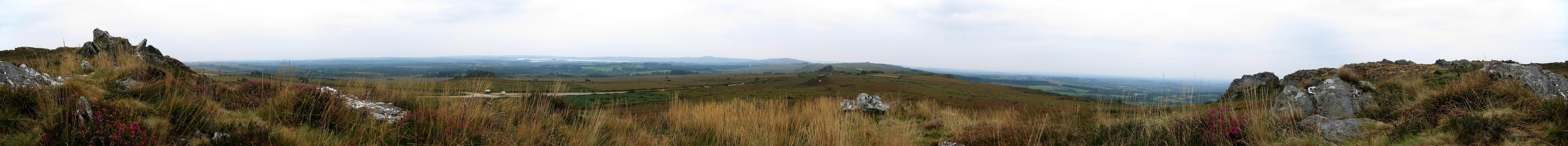
Roc'h Trevezel

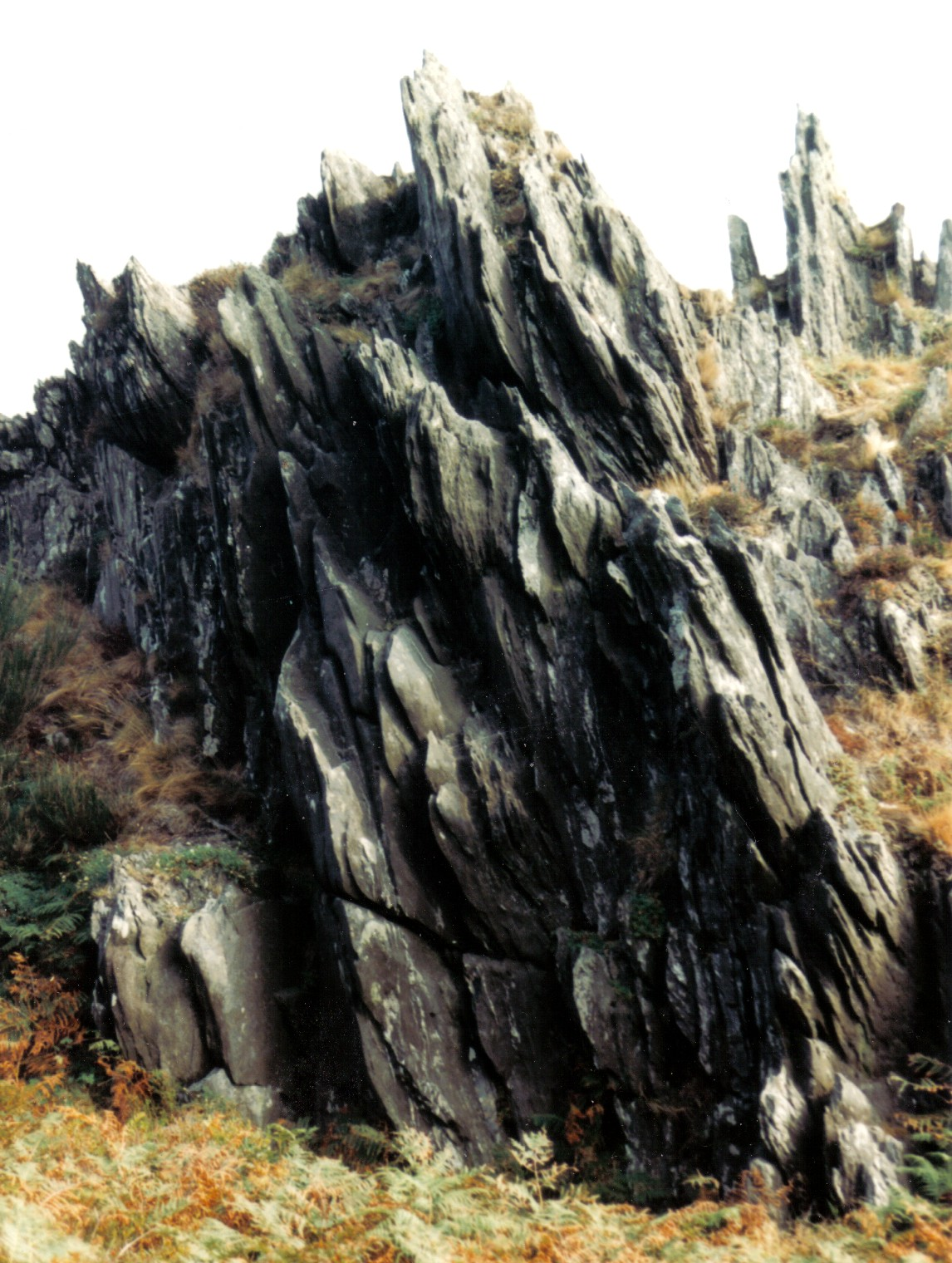
Roc'h Trevezel

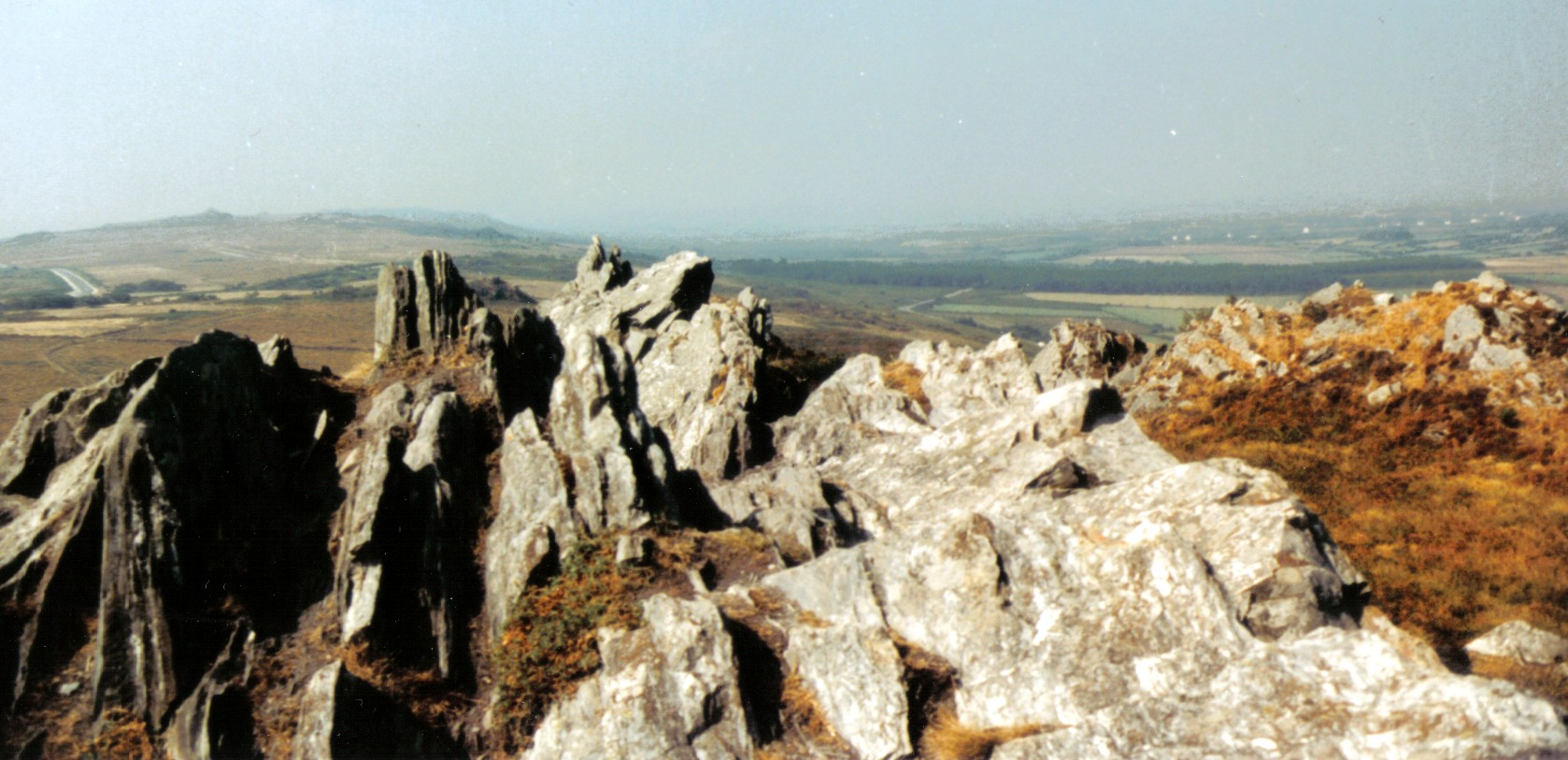
Roc'h Trevezel

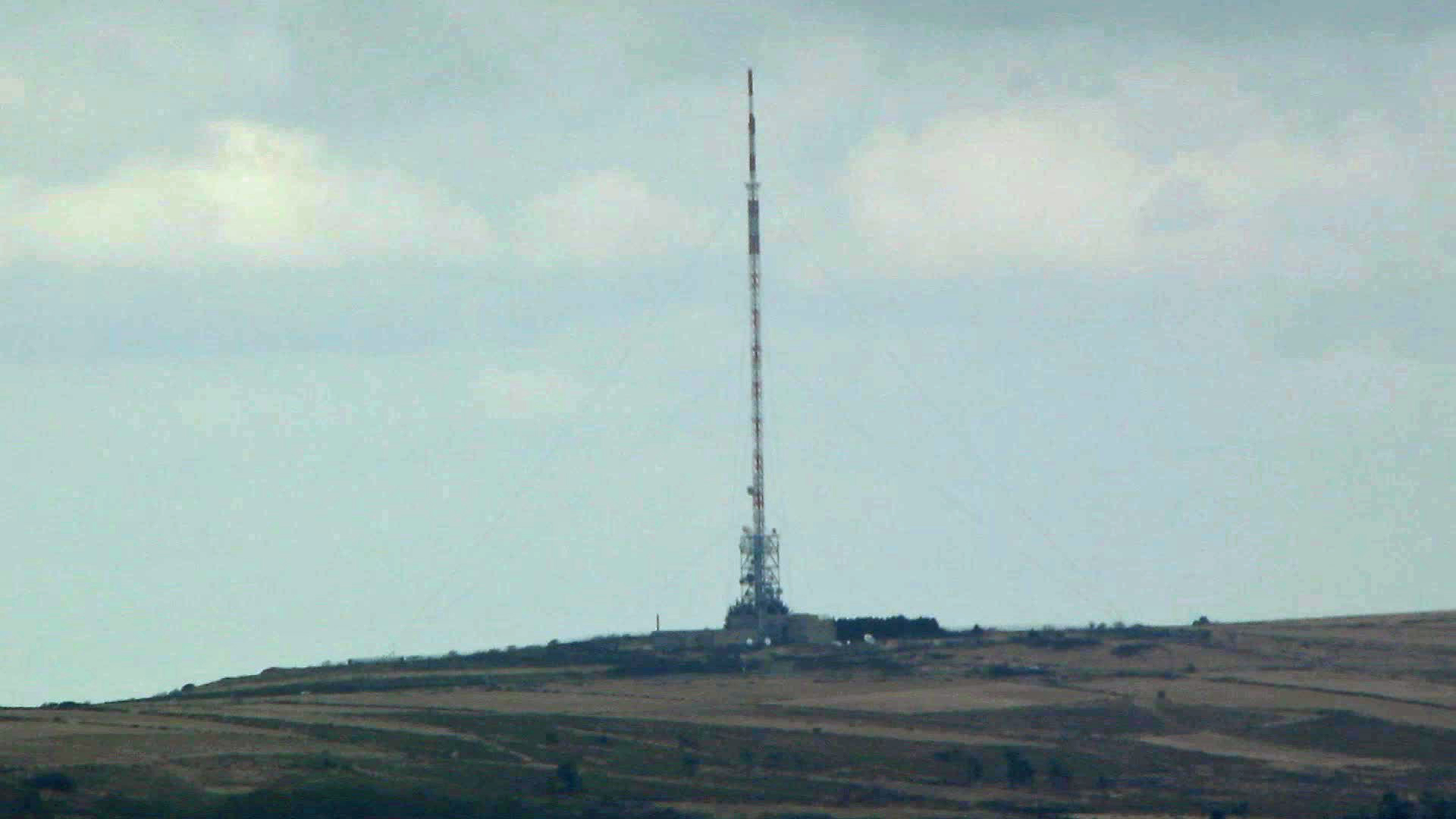
Roc'h Tredudon

The complete list of summits over 300 metres in height with 30 metres topographic prominence is as follows (figures are height, then prominence):

1. Roc'h Ruz (385m/315m)
2. Tuchenn Kador (385m/87m)
3. Roc'h Trevezel (385m/38m)
4. Menez Mikel (381m/83m)
5. Roc'h an Hadenn (372m/30m)
6. Roc'h an Hadenn West Top (355m/33m)
7. Mont Bel-Air (339m)
8. Menez ar Kili Vihan (332m/39m)
9. Menez Hom (330m)
10. Roc'h Touallaeron (326m)
11. Le Pave (323m/99m)
12. Butte Saint-Michel (321m)
13. sommet de La Labou (319m/84m)
14. Menez al Leure (317m/58m)
15. Roc'h Cleguer (316m/38m)
16. Menez Goariva (314m/56m)
17. La Montagne du Cosquer (310m/35m)
18. sommet de Guerdual (309m/82m)
19. Roc'h Losket (308m/50m)
20. sommet de Plouneour-Menez (308m/33m)
21. Roc'h an Aotrou (304m)
22. Karn an Hoed (300m/57m)
23. La Telegraphe (300m/47m)
