= Saint-Jean-du-Doigt =

Saint-Jean-du-Doigt Sant-Yann-ar-Biz
- Commune
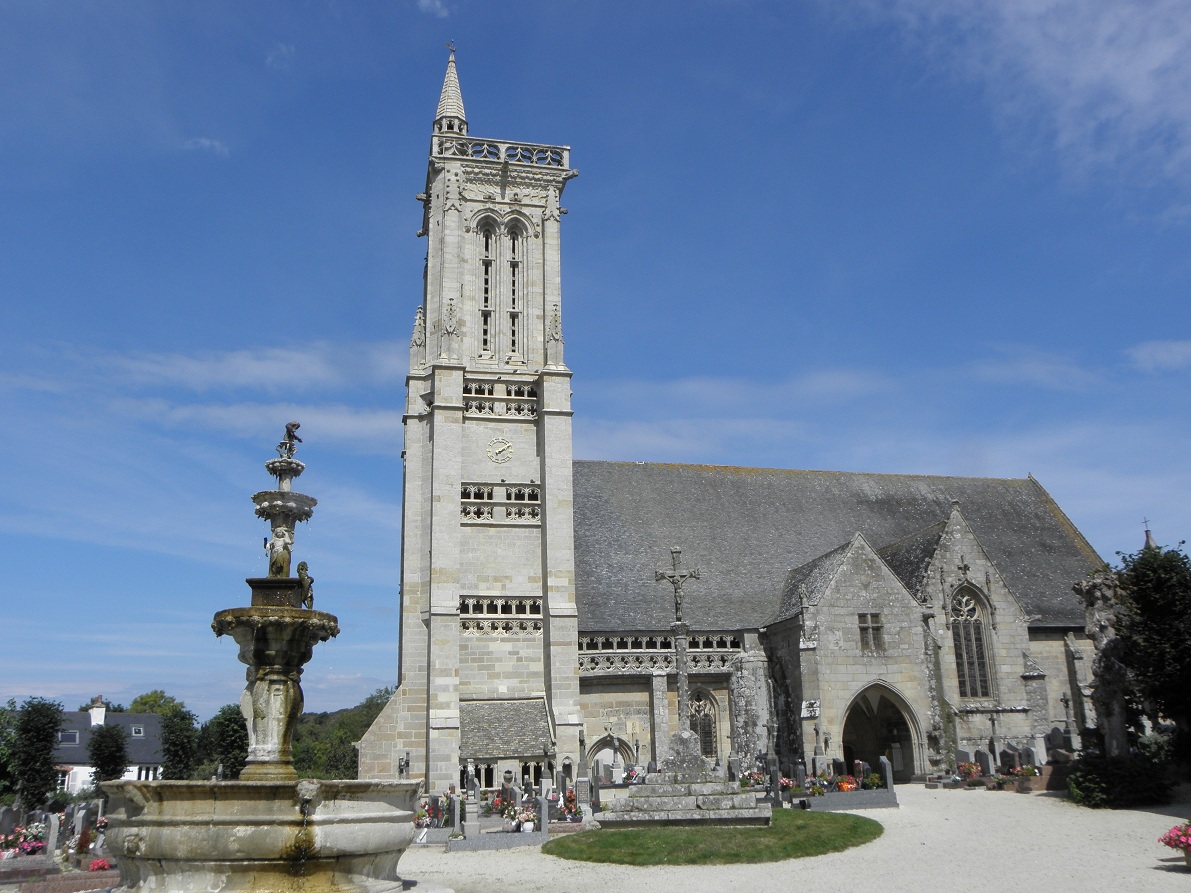
- The fountain and the church in Saint-Jean-du-Doigt
- Location of Saint-Jean-du-Doigt
- Location within France Location within Brittany
- Coordinates: 48°41′44″N 3°46′17″W
- Country: France
- Region: Brittany
- Department: Finistère
- Arrondissement: Morlaix
- Canton: Plouigneau
- Intercommunality: Morlaix Communauté

Government
  - Mayor (2023–2026): Monique Nedellec
- Area^{1}: 19.81 km^{2} (7.65 sq mi)
- Elevation: 15 m (49 ft)
- Highest elevation: 128 m (420 ft)
- Lowest elevation: 0 m (0 ft)
- Population (2023): 692
  - Density: 34.9/km^{2} (90.5/sq mi)
- Time zone: UTC+01:00 (CET)
  - Summer (DST): UTC+02:00 (CEST)
- INSEE/Postal code: 29251 /29630
- ^{1} French Land Register data, which excludes lakes, ponds, glaciers > 1 km^{2} (0.386 sq mi or 247 acres) and river estuaries.

Saint-Jean-du-Doigt (French pronunciation: [sɛ̃ ʒɑ̃ dy dwa]; Breton: Sant-Yann-ar-Biz) is a commune in the Finistère department of Brittany in north-western France.

== Population ==
Inhabitants of Saint-Jean-du-Doigt are called in French Saint Jeannais.

== See also ==
- Communes of the Finistère department
- Saint-Jean-du-Doigt Parish close
