= Plounéour-Ménez Parish close =

Coordinates: 48.4393°N 3.8926°W

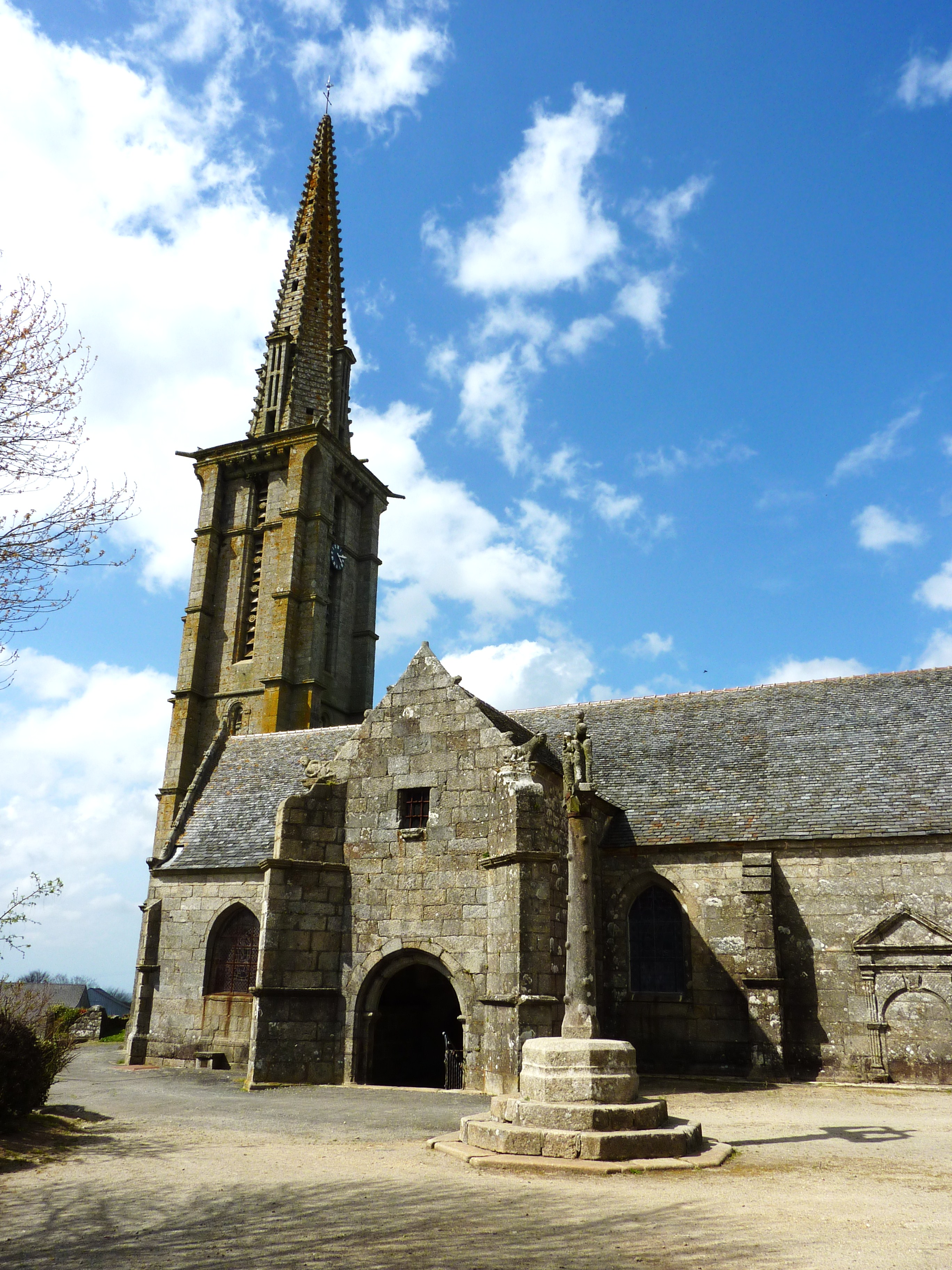
The Église Saint Yves at Plounéour-Ménez

The Plounéour-Ménez Parish close (Enclos paroissial) is located at Plounéour-Ménez, in the arrondissement of Morlaix, in Brittany, in north-western France. The church, dedicated to Saint Yves, was built in 1651 and there is evidence that it replaced an earlier and older church. The church and the ‘arc de triomphe’ have been a listed historical monument since 1914. The church at Plounéour-Ménez is dedicated to Saint Yves. Initially the enclos, constructed in granite, consisted of the church itself, the cemetery around the church, an ossuary, a calvary in the cemetery and a surrounding wall with several entrances, of which the main entrance is in the Arc de Triomphe style; the classic enclos paroissial in fact, but in time the cemetery was moved elsewhere and the ossuary destroyed. The church has nine transepts with large panelled aisles. The bell tower has no gallery and the clocheton on the spire was destroyed by lightning in 1847. The pulpit dates to the 17th century and is richly decorated with carvings depicting the four evangelists and their attributes: an angel for Saint Matthew, a lion for Saint Mark, a bull for Saint Luke and an eagle for Saint John. Other carvings depict Abraham's sacrifice (Binding of Isaac), the Pascal lamb, the Last Supper and Saint Peter's denial.

== The porch ==
In the church porch are two statues in Kersanton stone attributed to Roland Doré. They depict John the Evangelist with the letters I and P inscribed on a shield and Thomas the Apostle with M and G inscribed.

== Altarpieces ==
There are three altarpieces in the church. The Rosary altarpiece has a high-relief panel showing the Virgin Mary giving the Rosary to Saint Dominic and Saint Catherine of Sienna. A statue of Saint Anne stands on one side of this altarpiece and a statue of Saint Charles Borromée on the other side. The altarpiece dedicated to the "Trépassé" (the dead) was given to the church by the Dominican friars at Morlaix. It depicts the baby Jesus surrounded by flames and watched by three monks of the Dominican Order and three Augustinians. The Holy Father is shown at the top and at the base are scenes from the Virgin Mary's life.

== Statuary ==
The church has many old statues, including those of Saint Thomas and Saint John in stone, and wood carvings depicting the Holy Father, the Virgin Mary, Saint Paul Aurélien, Saint René, Saint Anne, Saint Etienne, Saint Yves, Saint Paul the Apostle and Saint Peter. There is a stained-glass window in the south aisle dating to 1868, the work of J.L. Nicolas.

== Calvaries ==
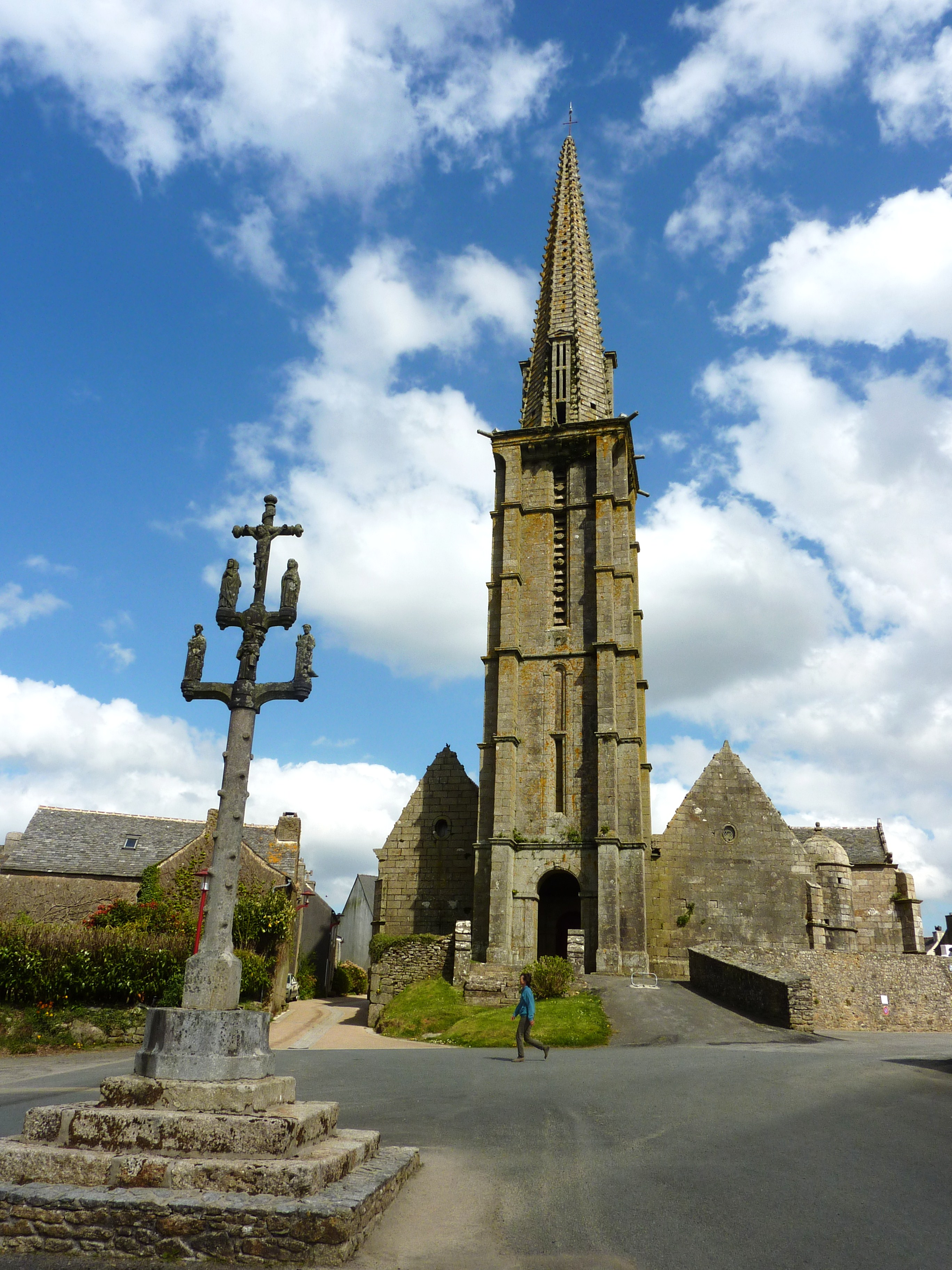
The west calvary at Plounéour-Ménez

The enclos paroissial at Plounéour-Ménez contains two calvaries. One dates to 1540 and has back-to-back statues (statues géminées) of the Virgin Mary backed with Mary Magdalene, and John the Evangelist backed with Saint Peter. The other calvary, in the west of the enclos, dates to 1641. This has statues of a monk, probably Saint Benoît, and a saint thought to be Saint Divy. On the lower of the two crosspieces are back-to-back statues of the Virgin Mary and Saint Peter and John the Evangelist and Saint Paul, all four by Roland Doré, who also sculpted the depiction of Christ on the cross. The other statues on the 1641 calvary were added during the restoration of 1896

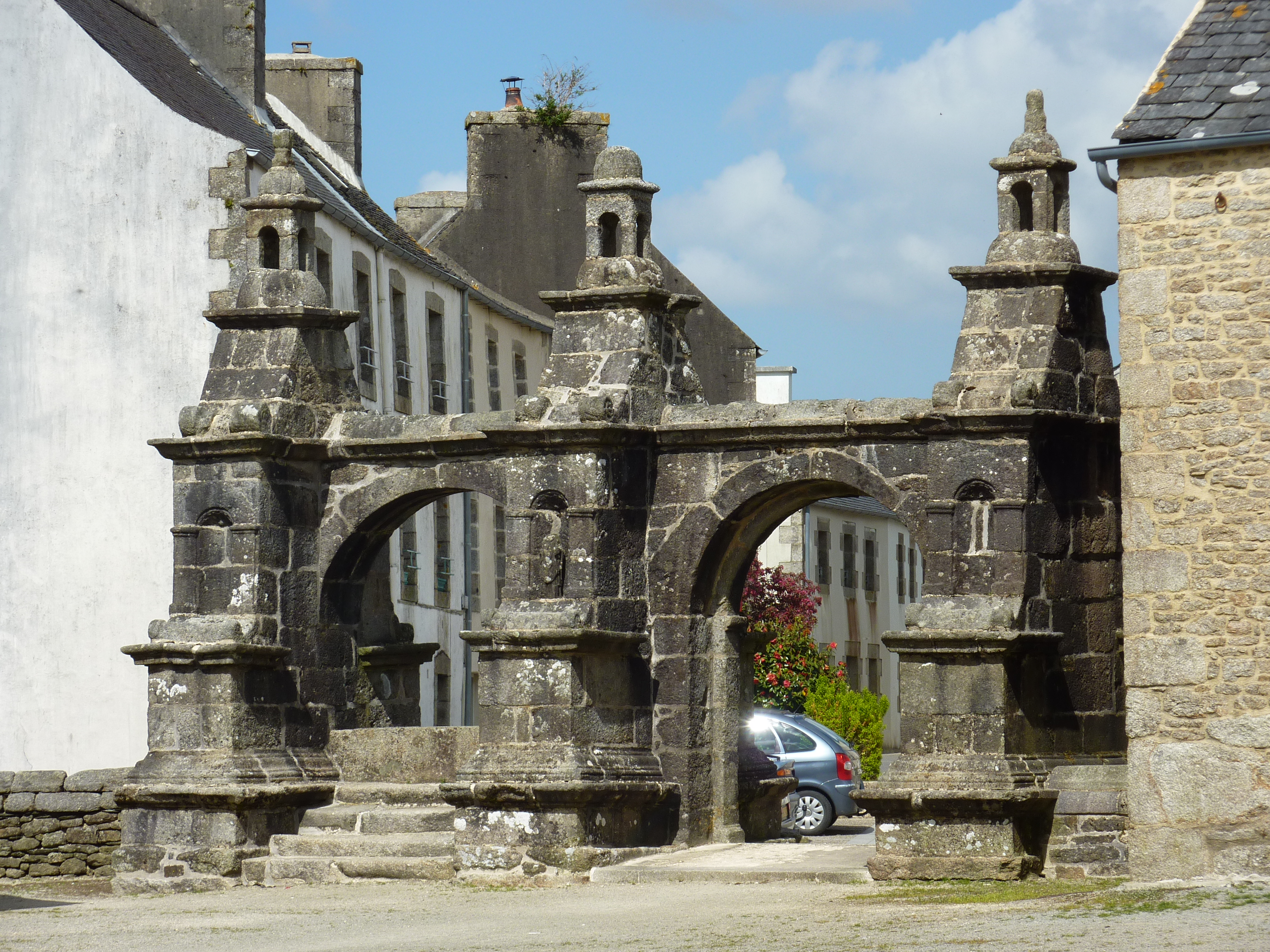
The Arc de triomphe at Plounéour-Ménez

== Note ==
There is also a cross at Kersimonet by Doré, restored in 1885. Also at the nearby Manoir du Penhoat there is a fountain with the remains of a Doré calvary (Statues of Christ, Saint Francis of Assisi and Saint James the Greater)
