= Saint-Thégonnec Parish close =

Coordinates: 48.5204°N 3.9465°W

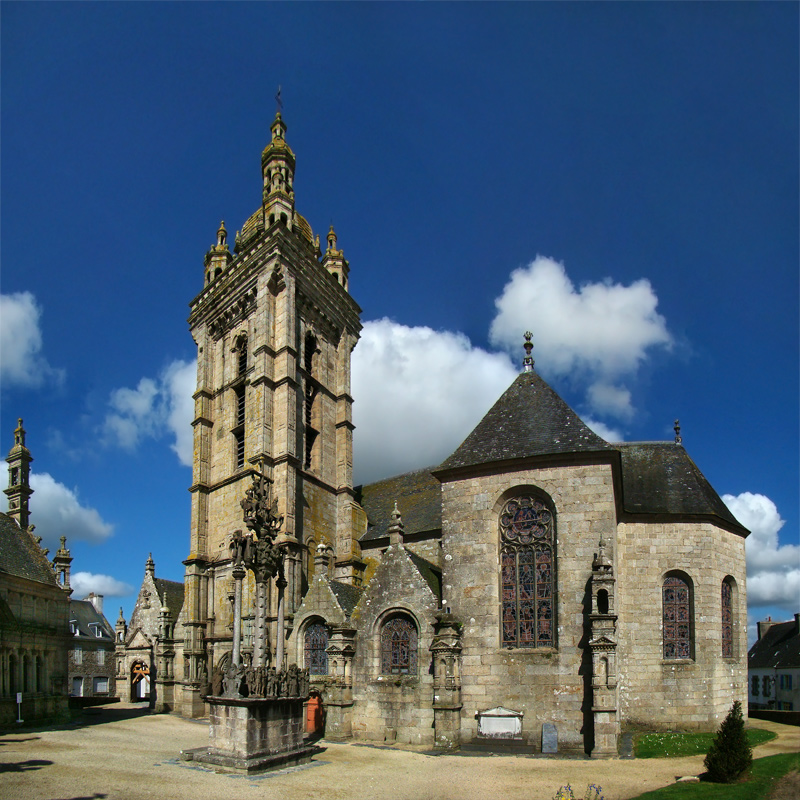
Notre-Dame church at Saint-Thégonnec

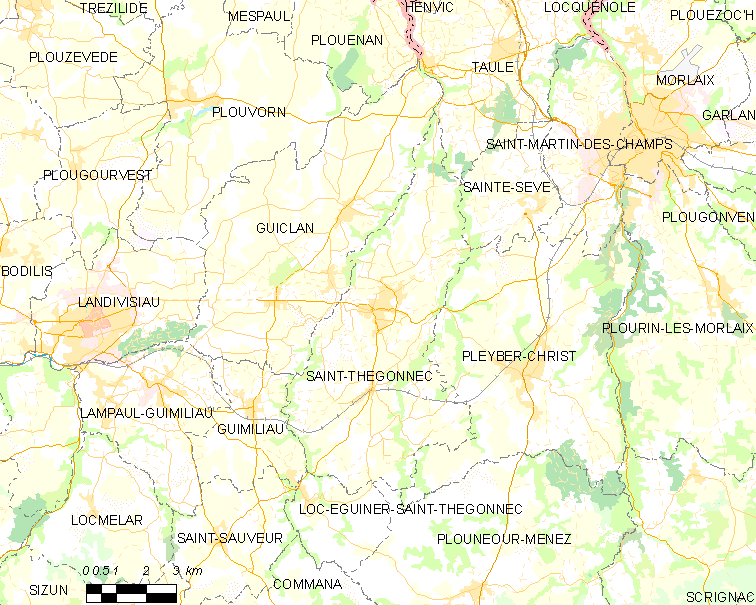
Map showing the location of Saint-Thégonnec

The Saint-Thégonnec Parish close (enclos paroissial) is located at Saint-Thégonnec (Sant Tegoneg in Breton) in the arrondissement of Morlaix in Brittany in north-western France. The enclos paroissial comprises the parish church of Notre-Dame, a triumphal arch and enclosure wall, an ossuary, and the Calvary at Saint-Thégonnec. It is a listed historical monument. Another calvary is set into the enclosure wall. A war memorial, dedicated to those lost in the 1914–1918 war, is set into another section of the wall.

On 8 June 1998, a fire destroyed a part of the north aisle; an extensive programme of restoration was finished in 2005. The Gothic bell-tower and Renaissance tower dates from 1563 and was finished in 1626. The porch has a sculpture depicting Saint Thégonnec in the attire of a bishop. Inside the porch, statues of some of the apostles lead towards the door into the church. The church has a rood screen and in the choir area the stained glass is by Jean-Louis Nicolas which dates from 1862–1863.

== History of the church ==
The western Beaumanoir-type bell tower porch dates to 1563 and the monumental entrance was completed in 1587. Between 1589 and 1610 the bell-tower was improved and crowned with lanterons in 1626. The church bells are dated 1599 and 1605 and a sun-dial dates to 1606. Between 1640 and 1652 the north aisle was built by Paul Prédiry and Mathurin Renault, master masons, and the fenestration came from the workshop of Jean Le Bescont and were transported from Landerneau to Saint-Thégonnec and erected in 1651. The south aisle was reconstructed from 1653 to 1658 by Yves Le Bescont. The church was enlarged between 1667 and 1669, the apse being moved by several feet, this work being executed by Guillaume Plédran and in 1670 the western part of the nave was raised to accommodate the installation of the organ. From 1686 to 1690, the architect Guillaume Le Taoc rebuilt the sacristy to the north of the choir. Between 1713 and 1714 further modifications were carried out under the direction of the Brest architect, Etienne Le Marchand.

== The triumphal arch ==
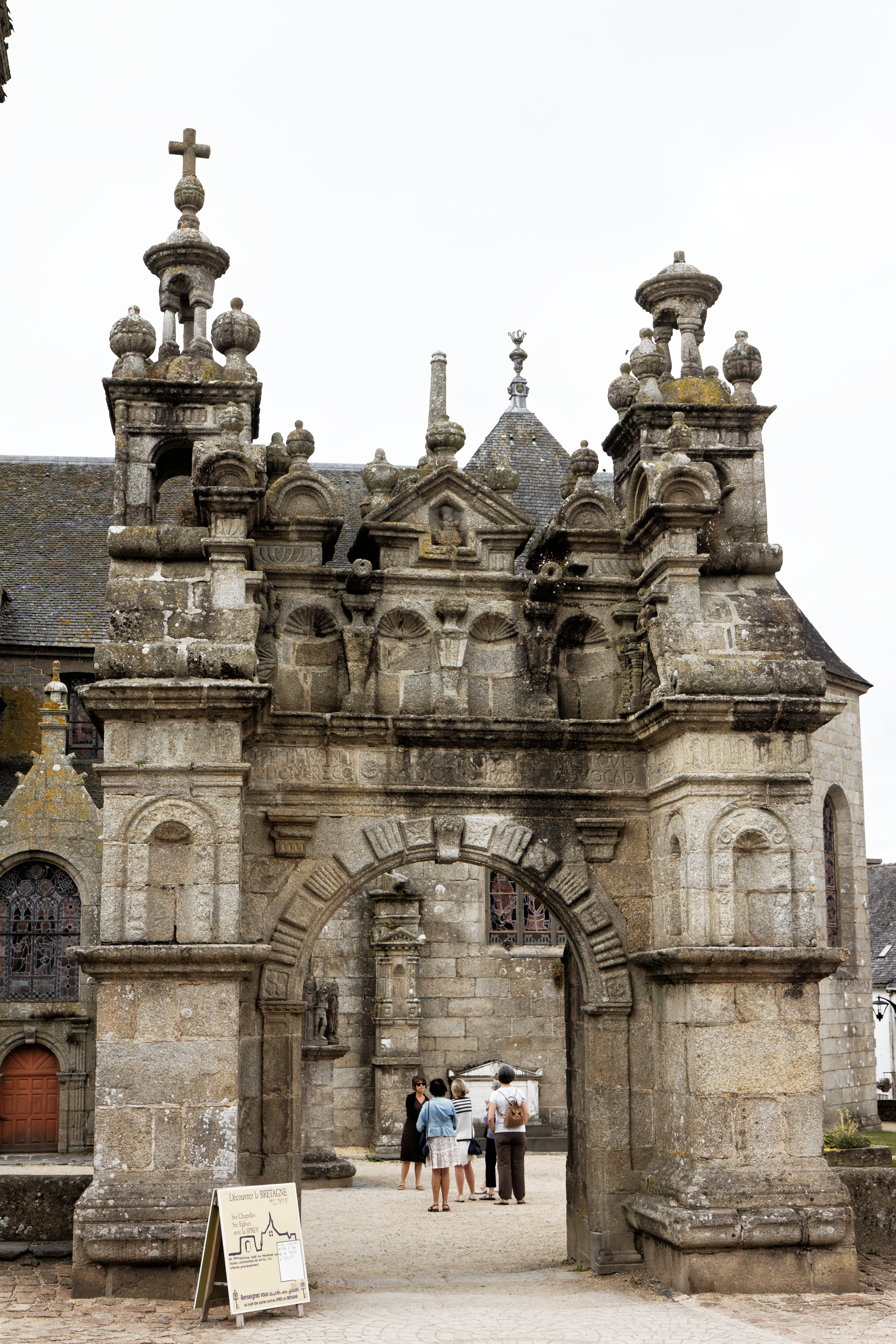
The central arch of the enclos entrance at Saint-Thégonnec. Note at the top of the central arch the triangular topped niche with a depiction of the Holy Father giving a blessing. Below this we can see the two canons and the empty niches decorated at the top with Coquille Saint-Jacques shells

The triumphal arch, an elaborate Renaissance-style entrance to the enclos paroissial, is attributed to the masons of the nearby Château de Kerjean's workshop. It was made from granite quarried from Plounéour-Ménez. Four massive pillars, topped with cubic lanterons, form three entrances, with the central section forming an arch. Statues of the Archangel Gabriel and the Virgin Mary seated at a prie-dieu, depict the Annunciation and decorate the structure which has four niches decorated with carvings of shells these separated by pilasters and dominated by two canons. There is also a sculpture depicting Saint Thégonnec riding an ass. A sculpture depicting the Holy Father is contained in a triangular topped niche at the top of the central arch. The two side entrances have stiles to stop animals accessing the enclos and the central arch has iron gates.

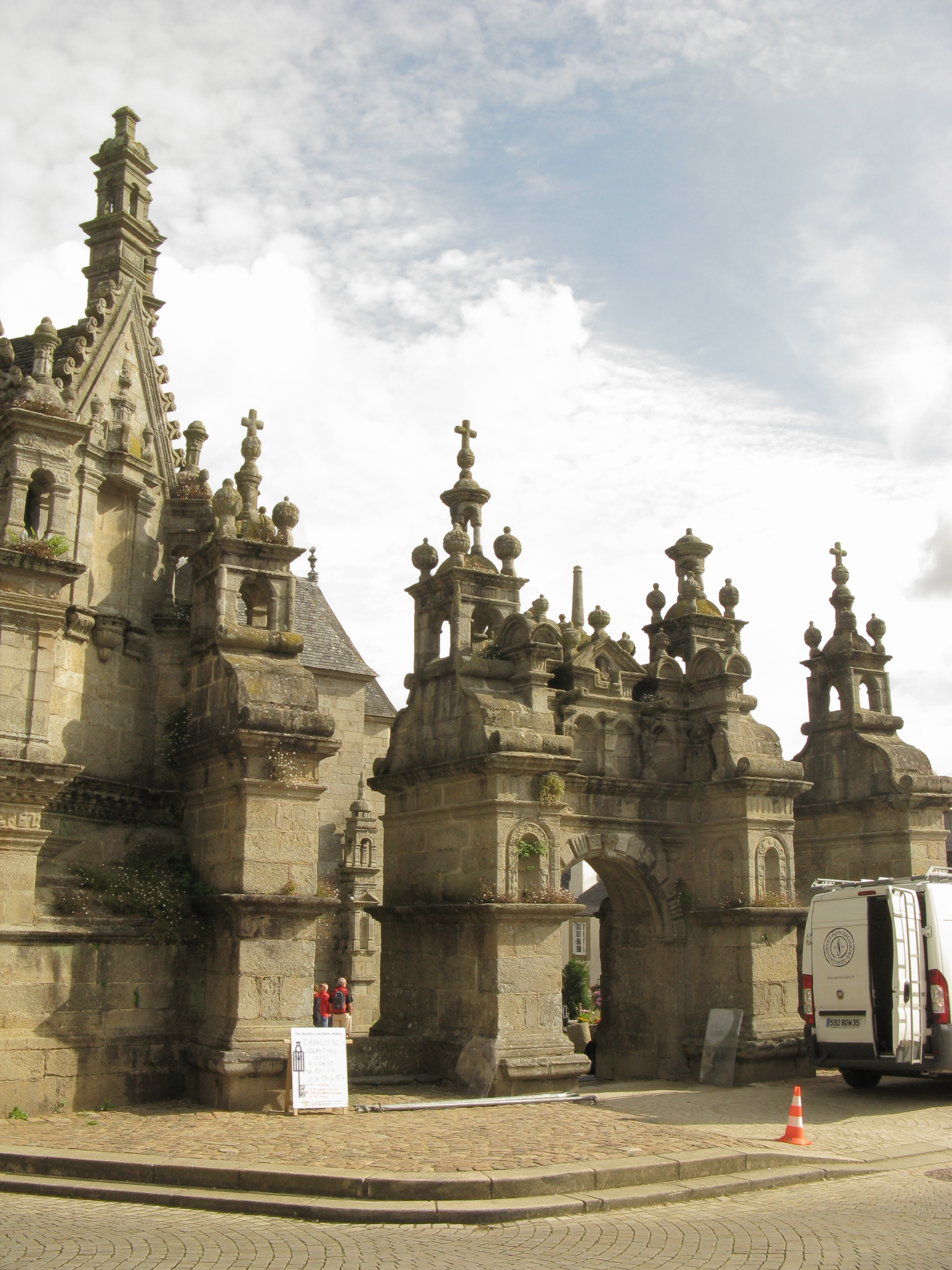
The entrance to the Saint-Thégonnec enclos

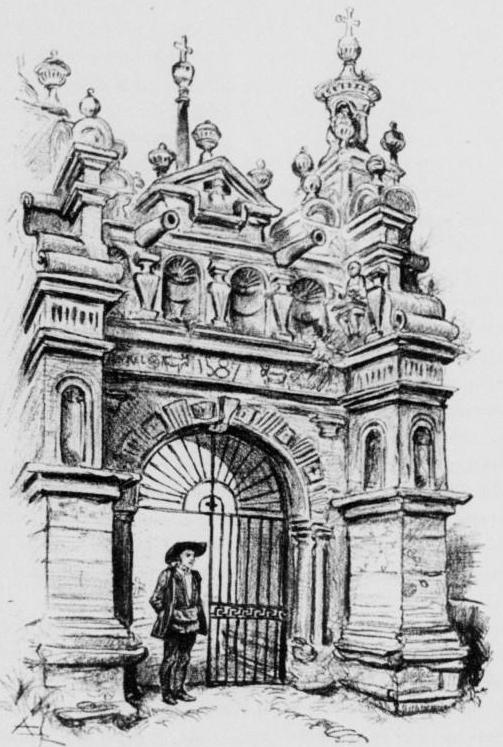
Lithograph by Albert Robida showing the central arch of the Saint-Thégonnec entrance published in the magazine "La vieille France, Bretagne" in around 1900.

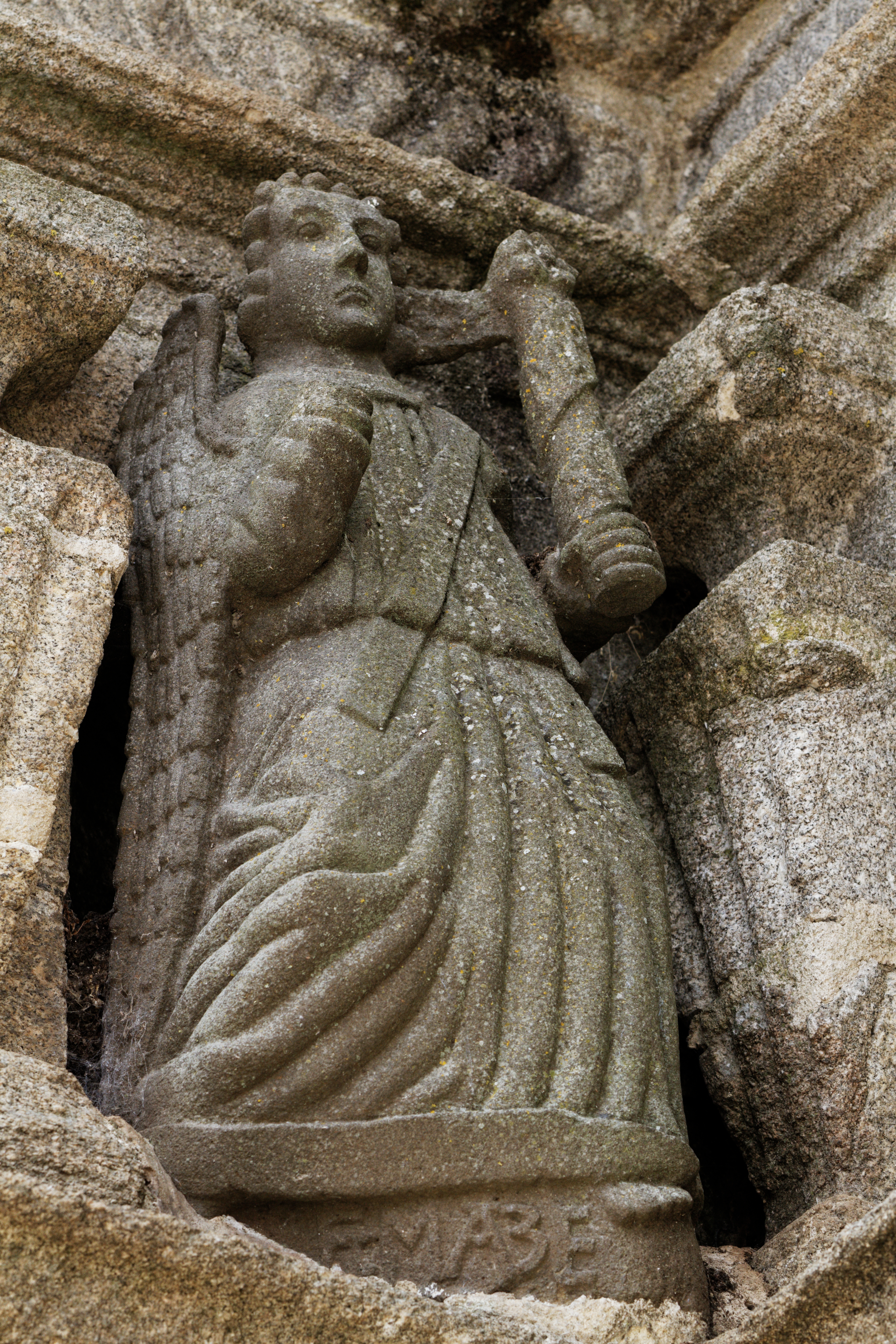
The Archangel Gabriel on the entrance to the Saint-Thégonnec enclos

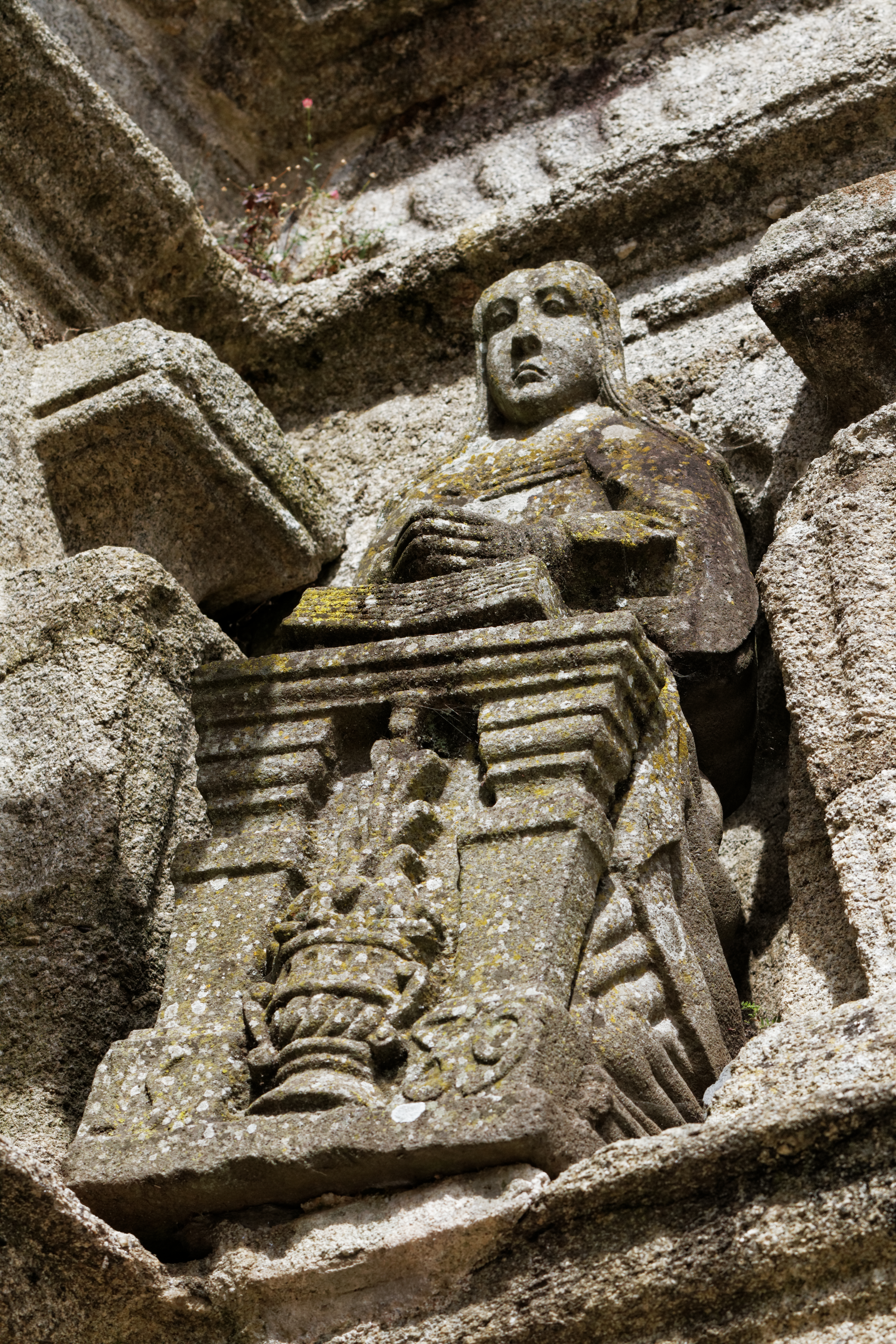
Sculpture depicting the Virgin Mary on the entrance to the Saint-Thégonnec enclos

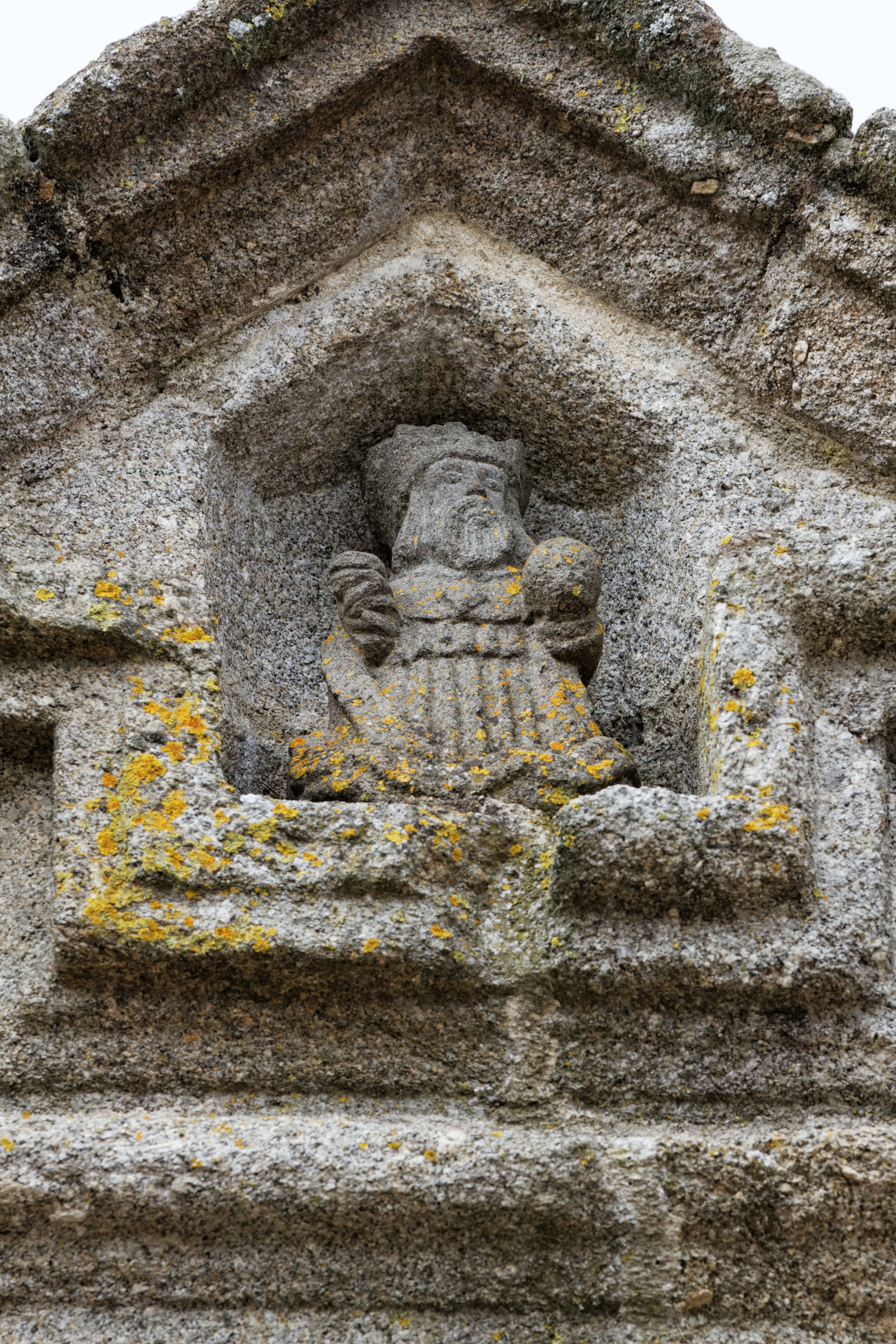
The Holy Father in a niche on the entrance to the Saint-Thégonnec enclos

== The bell-tower or south porch ==
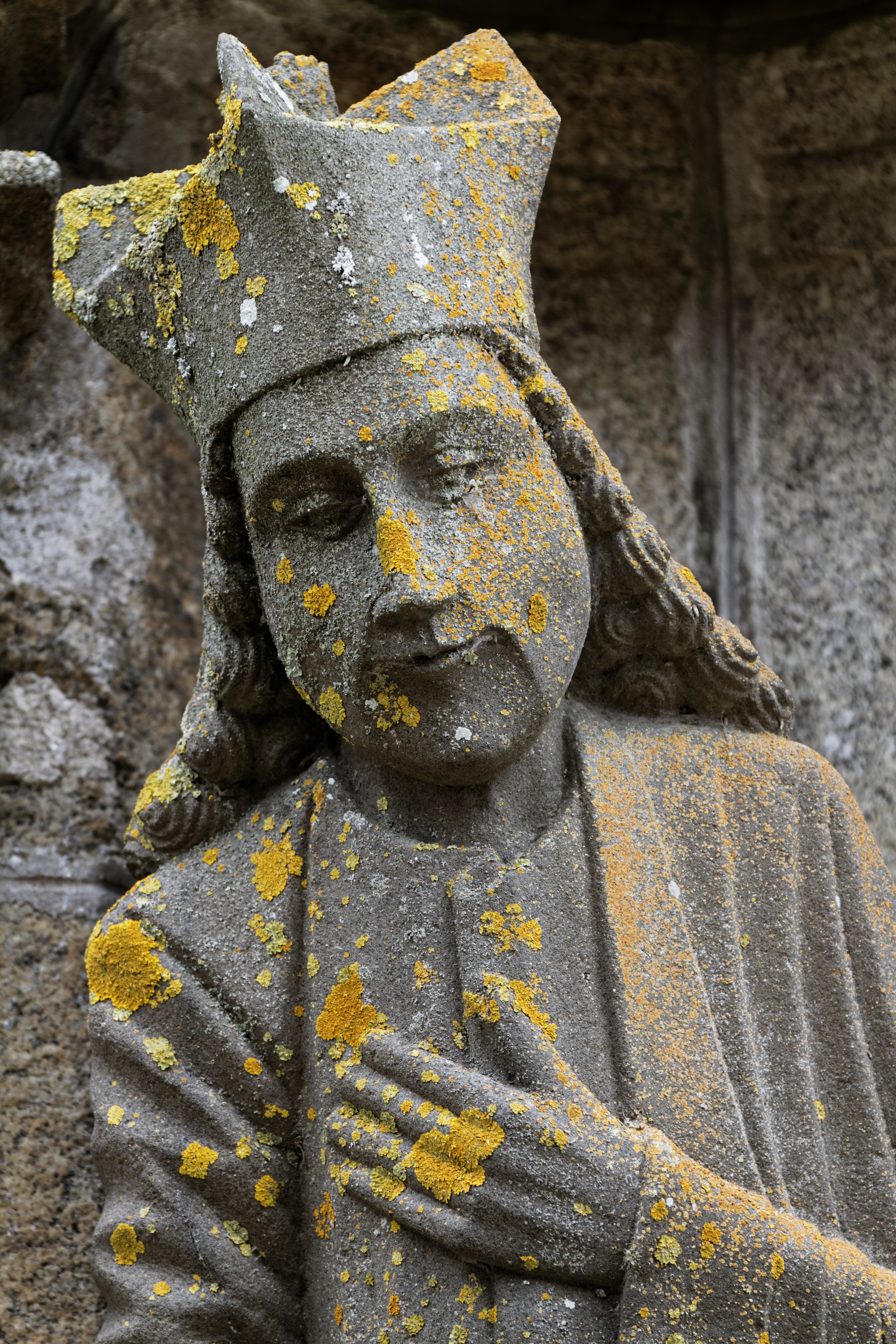
The statue of John the Evangelist by Roland Doré which decorates one of the buttresses of the bell-tower porch

Whilst the church of Notre-Dame at Saint-Thégonnec was first built between 1563 and 1599, it has been rebuilt on many occasions since then and the 1563 gabled bell-tower porch on the left of the tower is the only part of the original church to survive. Above the porch is a statue of Saint Thégonnec and the side buttresses have niches containing Roland Doré (sculptor) statues depicting the Annunciation, John the Evangelist and Saint Nicolas. Inside the bell-tower porch are statues of four of the apostles, also by Doré, and over the entrance door to the church itself there is a statue of the Virgin Mary with child. The John the Evangelist statue carries the inscription

"FACIT LAN 1625;R;DORE MA FAICT J MAZE.IANNE,INIZAN.MA FAICT FAIRE"

In the Annunciation group, the pedestal of the statue of the angel is inscribed "Y GUILLERM" and that of the Virgin Mary "G POULIQUEN". The statue of Saint John inside the porch is inscribed "IAN GVILLOME", that of Saint James the Greater is inscribed "S JACQ H,MAZE et JACQUES PICARD", Saint Thomas carries a phylactery reading "CARNIS RESURRECTIONEM" and just to the left "Y.RIVOAL 1632." Doré of course added the iconic "La dérision du Christ" to the Saint-Thégonnec calvary.

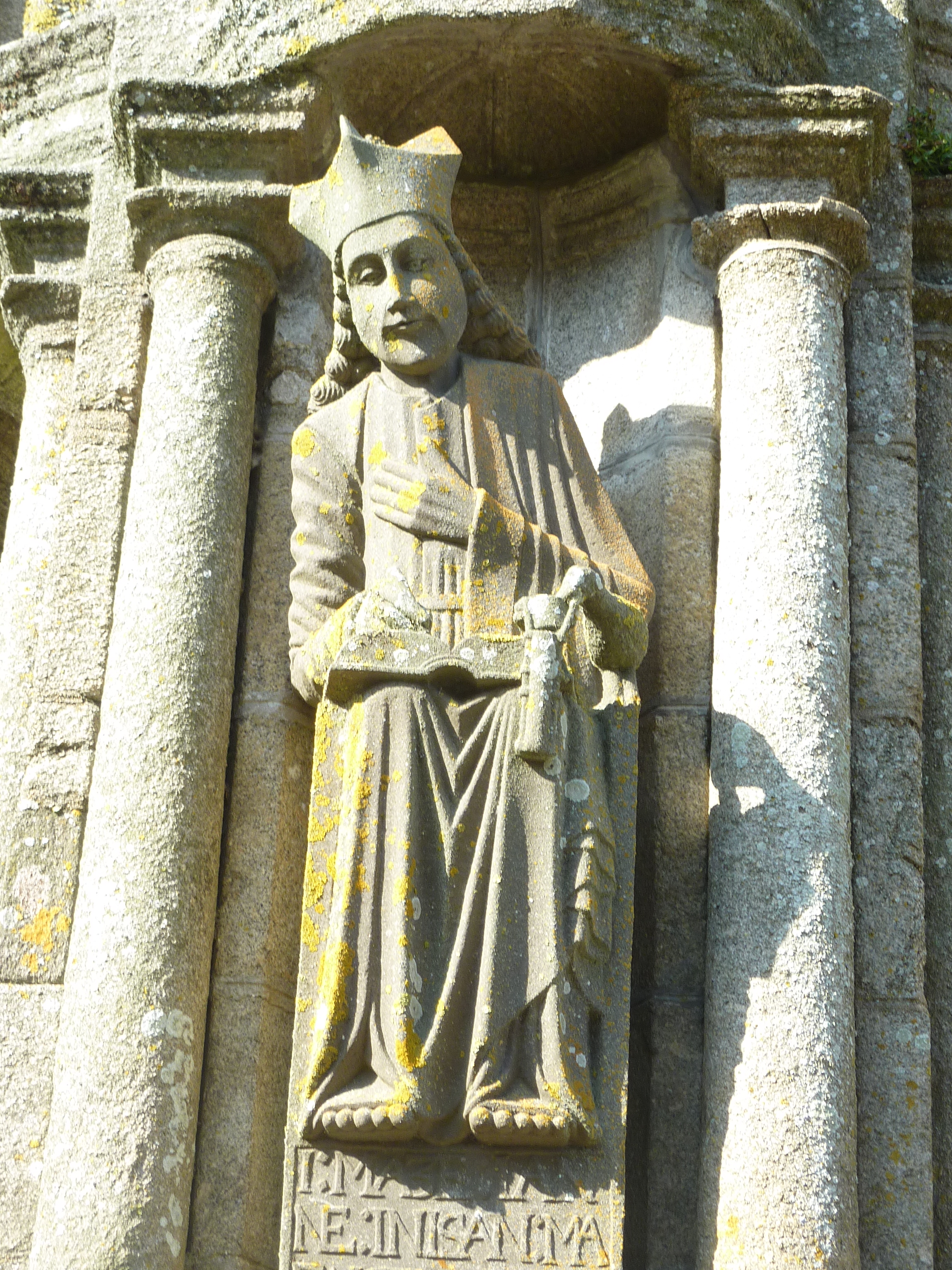
Statue of John the Evangelist outside the south porch of the church of Notre- Dame at Saint-Thégonnec. His attribute the eagle is featured just under his left arm

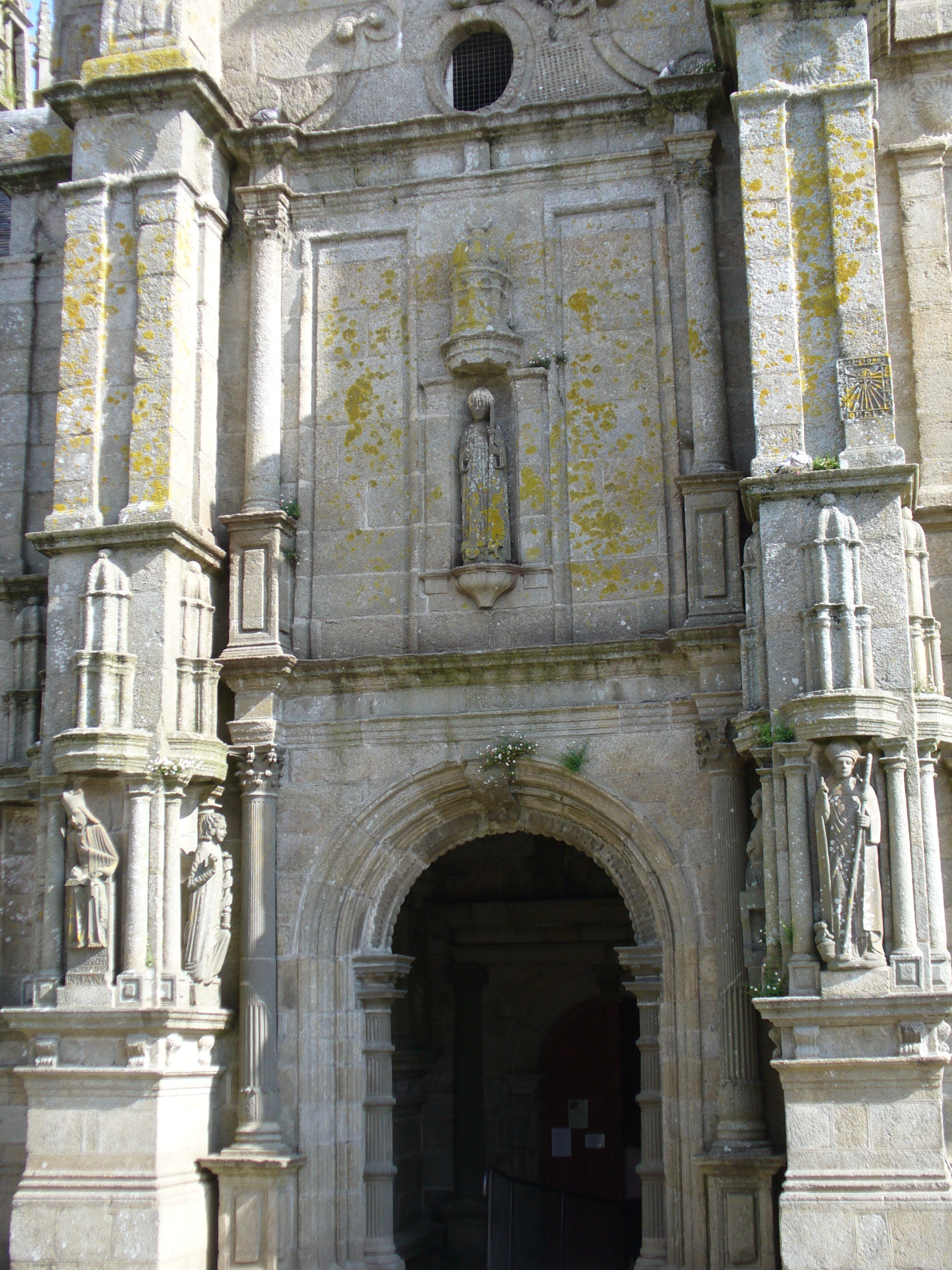
The statue of Saint-Thégonnec over the porch entrance

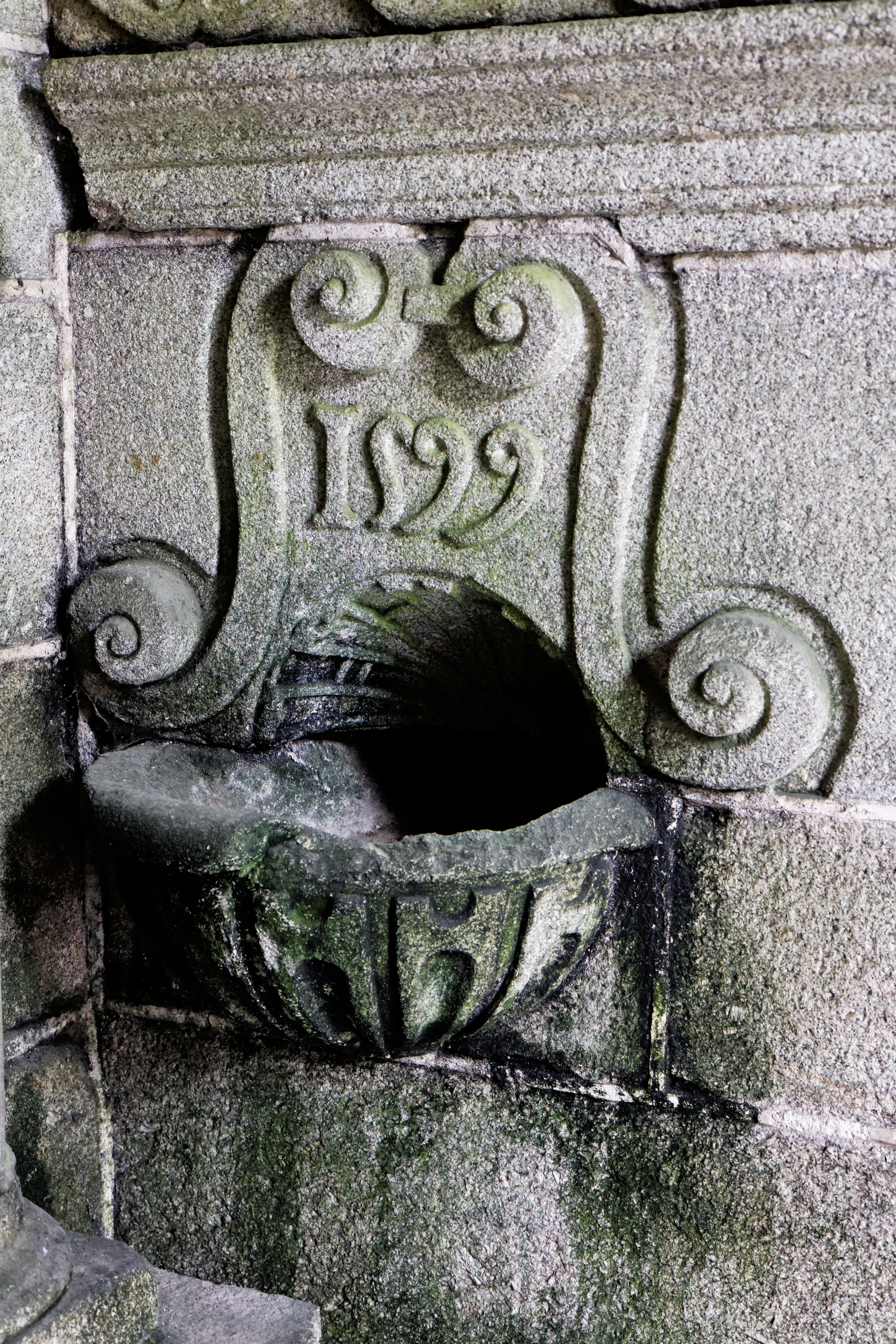
The stoup in the south porch

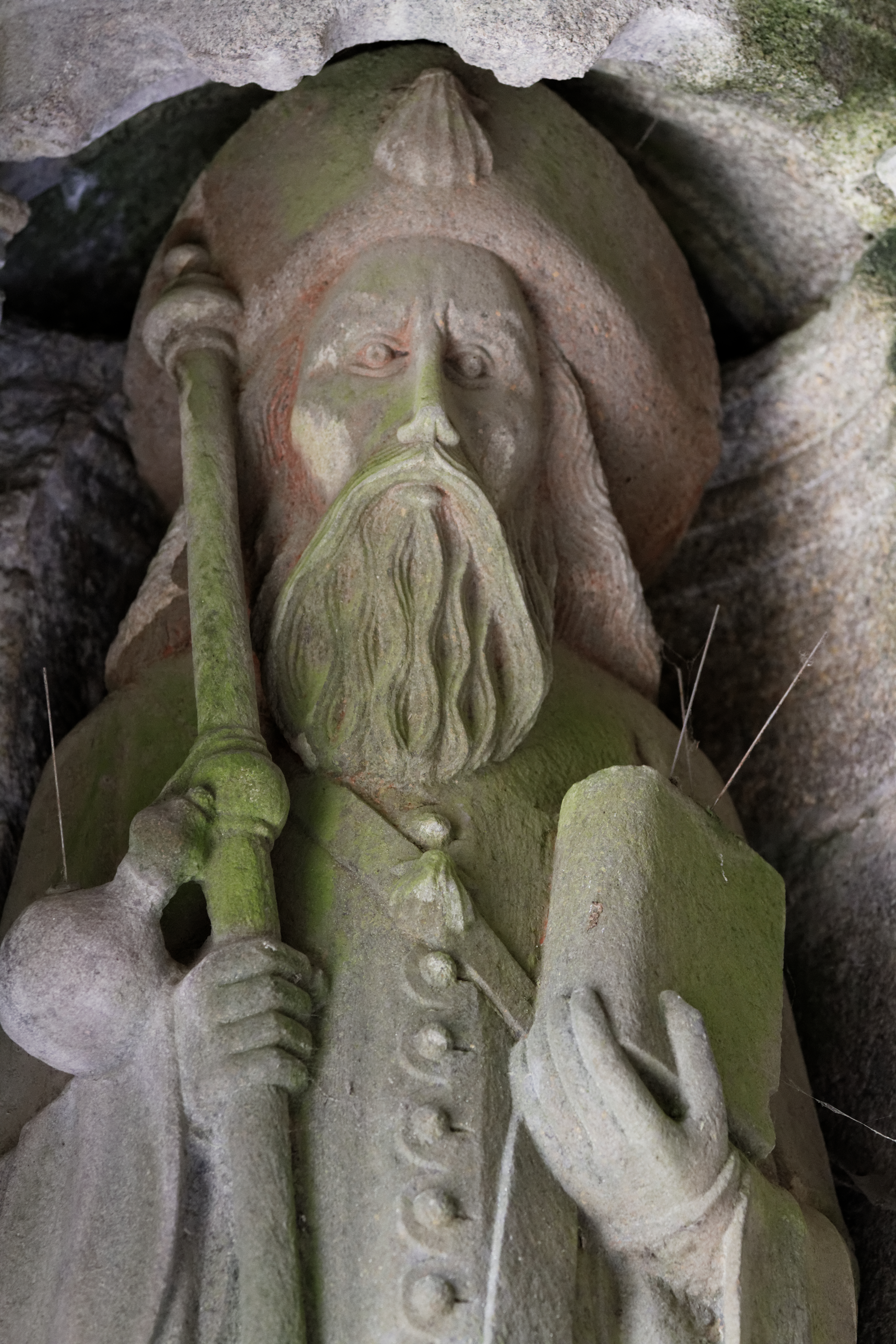
St James the Greater. Note the pilgrim's hat with scallop shell badge

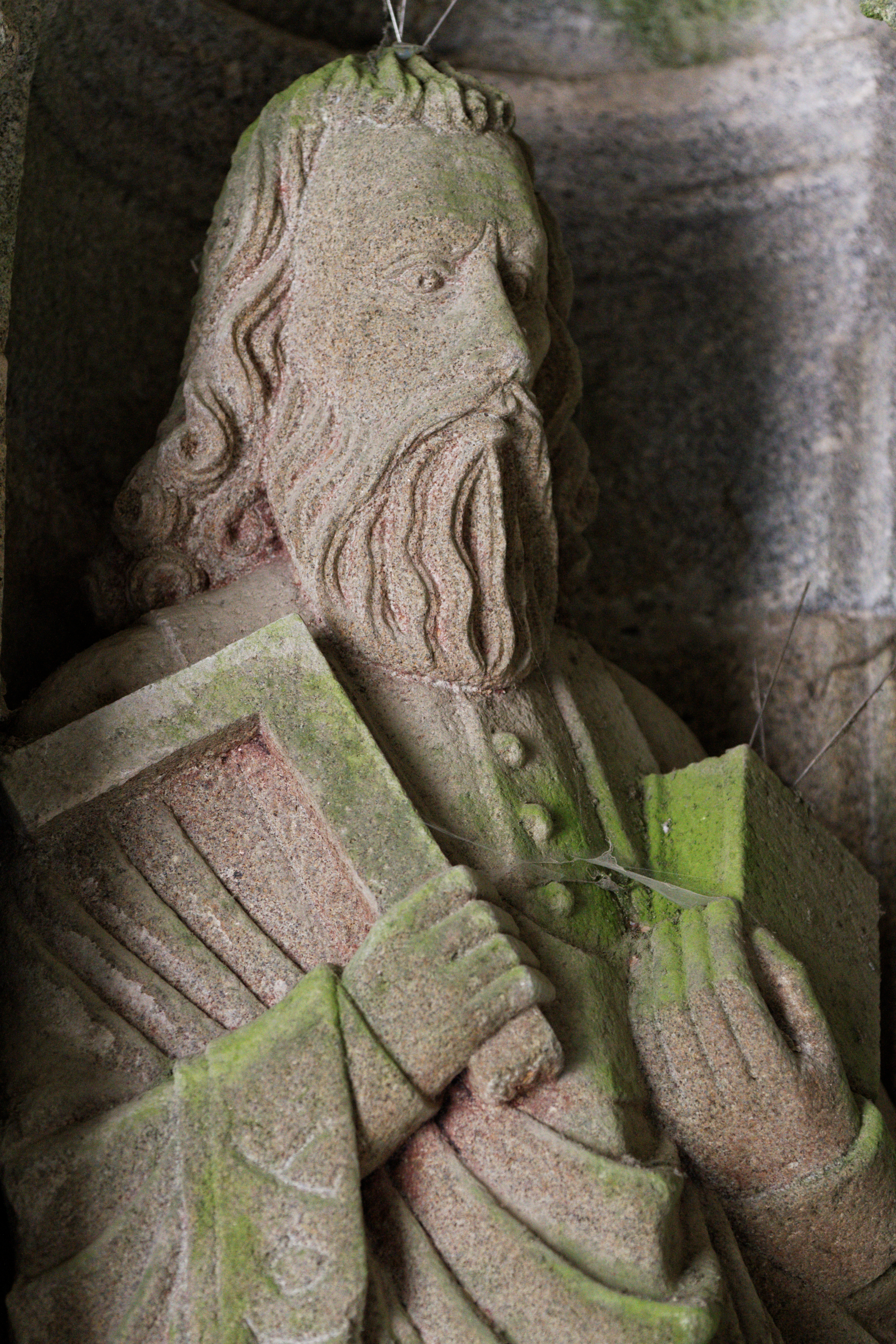
Saint Thomas with his attribute; the set-square

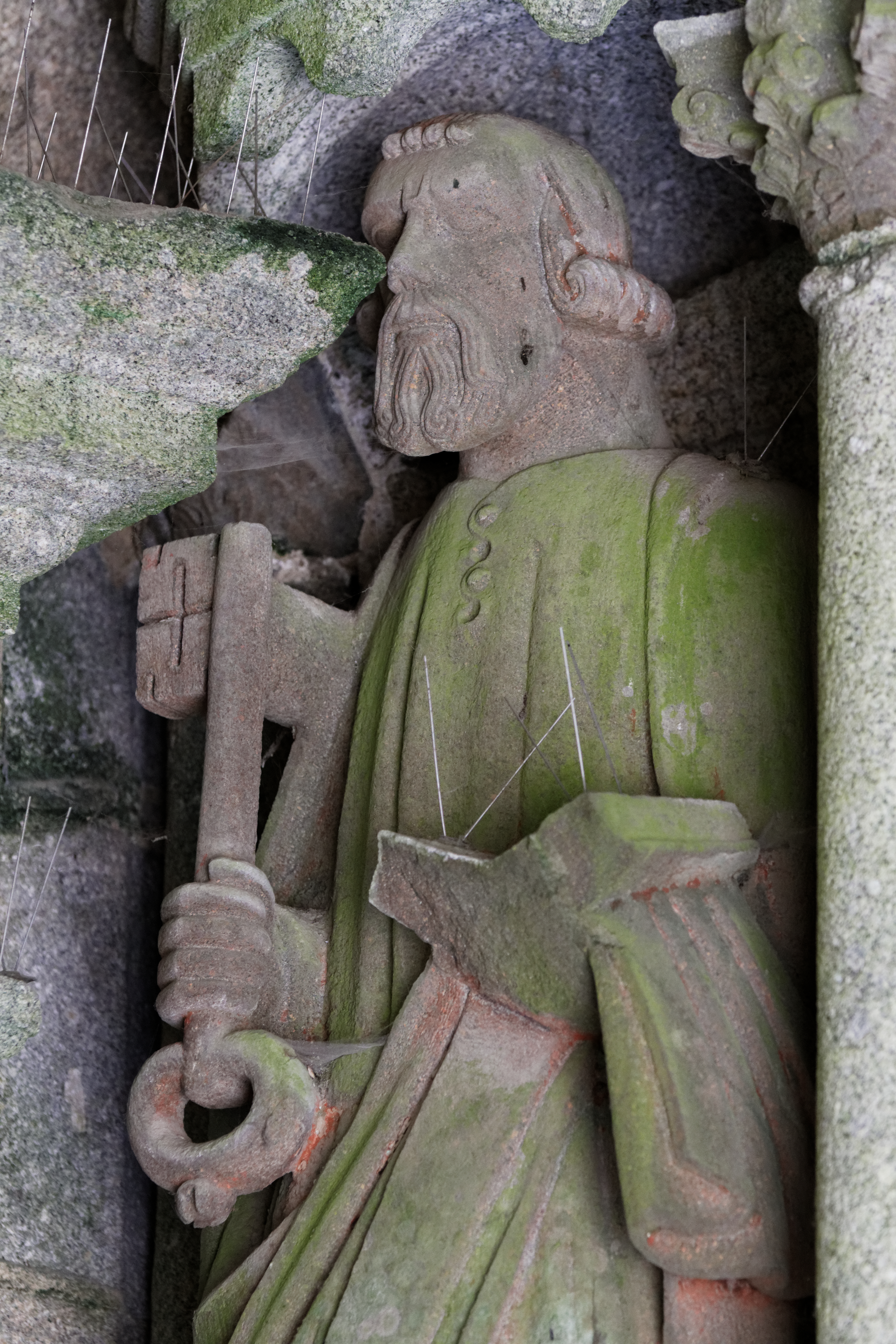
Saint Peter holds his key

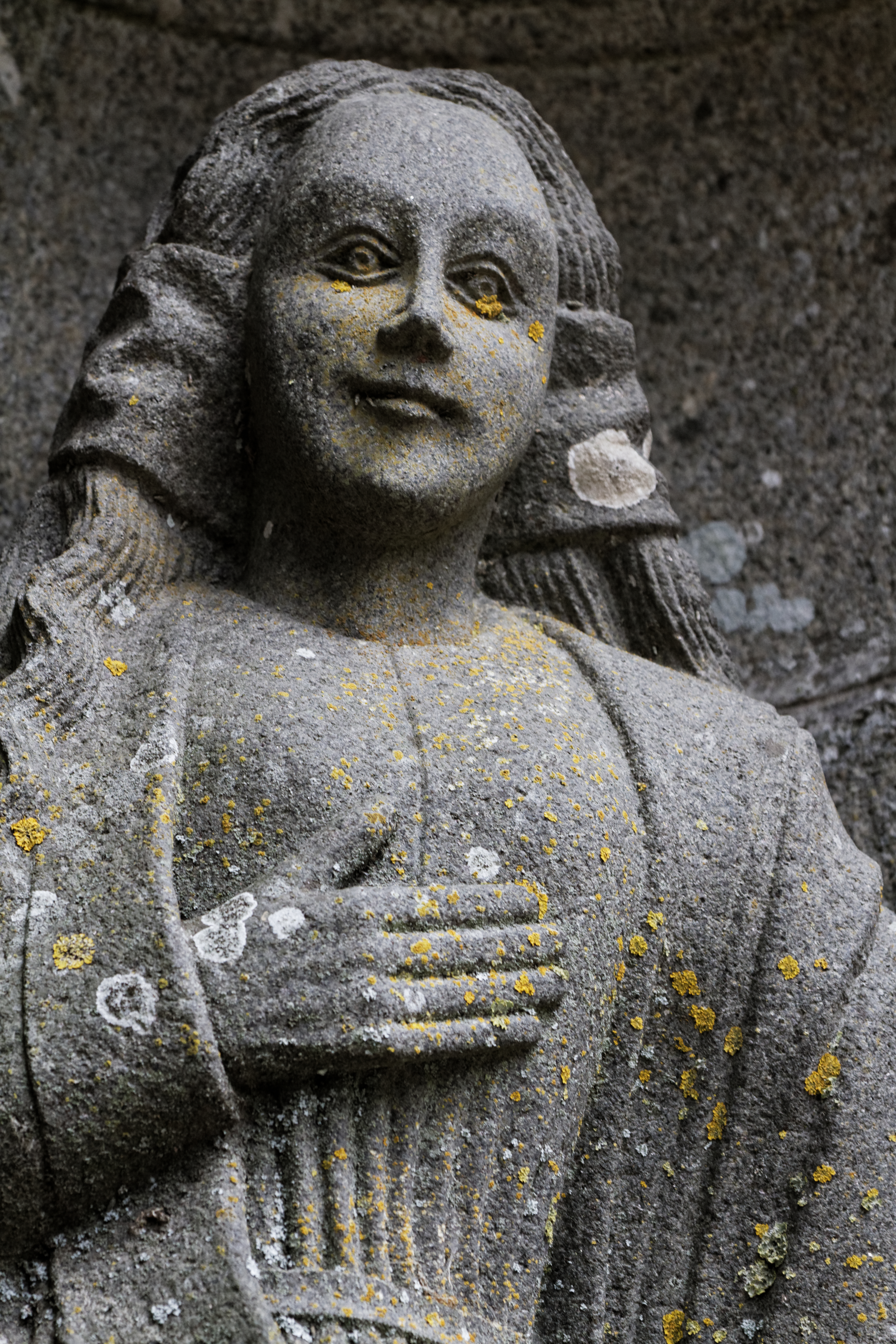
Statue of the Virgin Mary outside the south porch of the church of Notre- Dame at Saint-Thégonnec

== The Larhantec calvary ==
Apart from the Grand Calvaire at Saint-Thégonnec there is a second calvary constructed in 1864 with statues of the Virgin Mary and John the Evangelist by Yann Larhantec. This calvary is set into the enclosure wall and accessed by a double stairway.

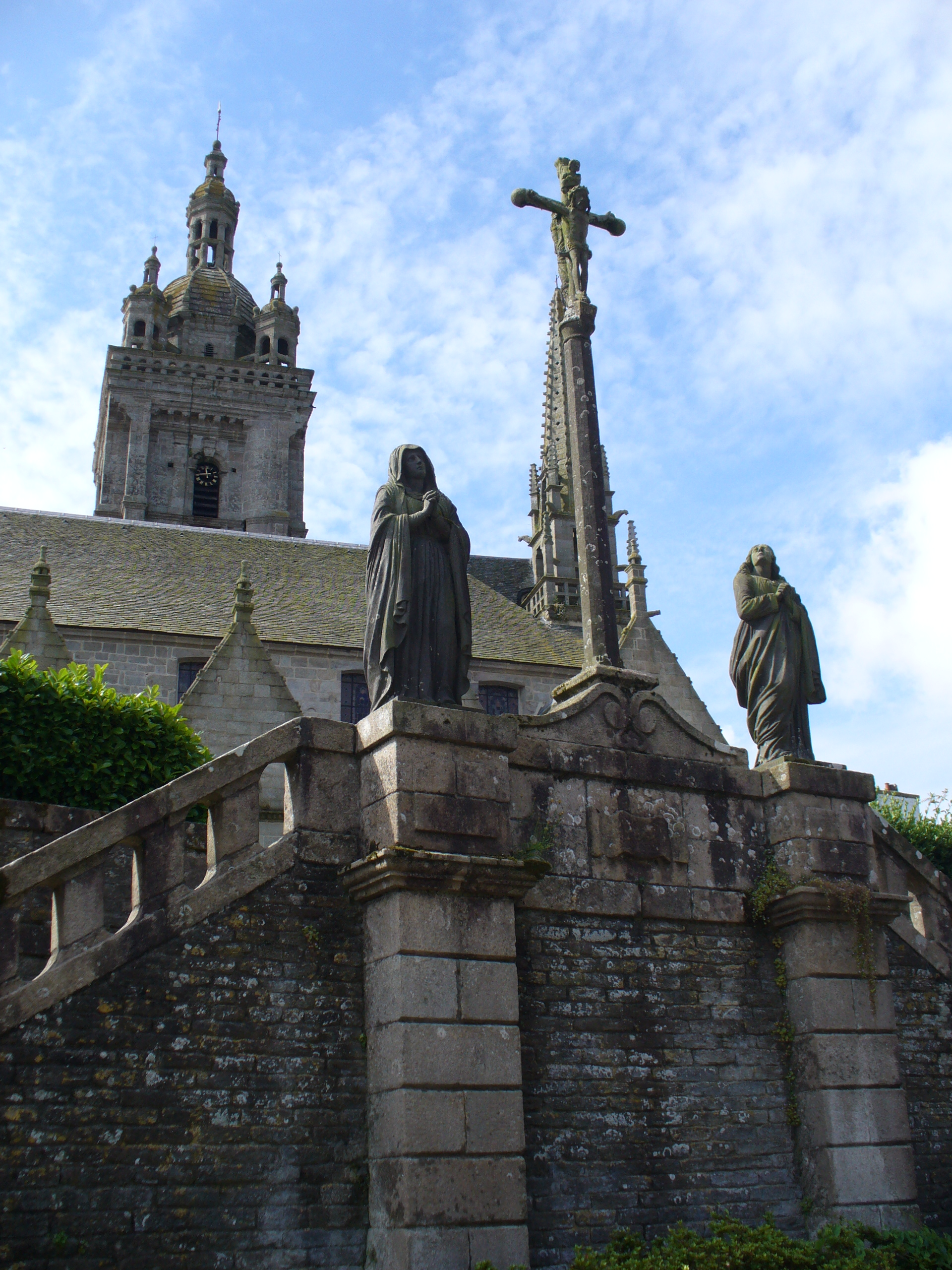
The Larhantec calvary at Saint-Thégonnec

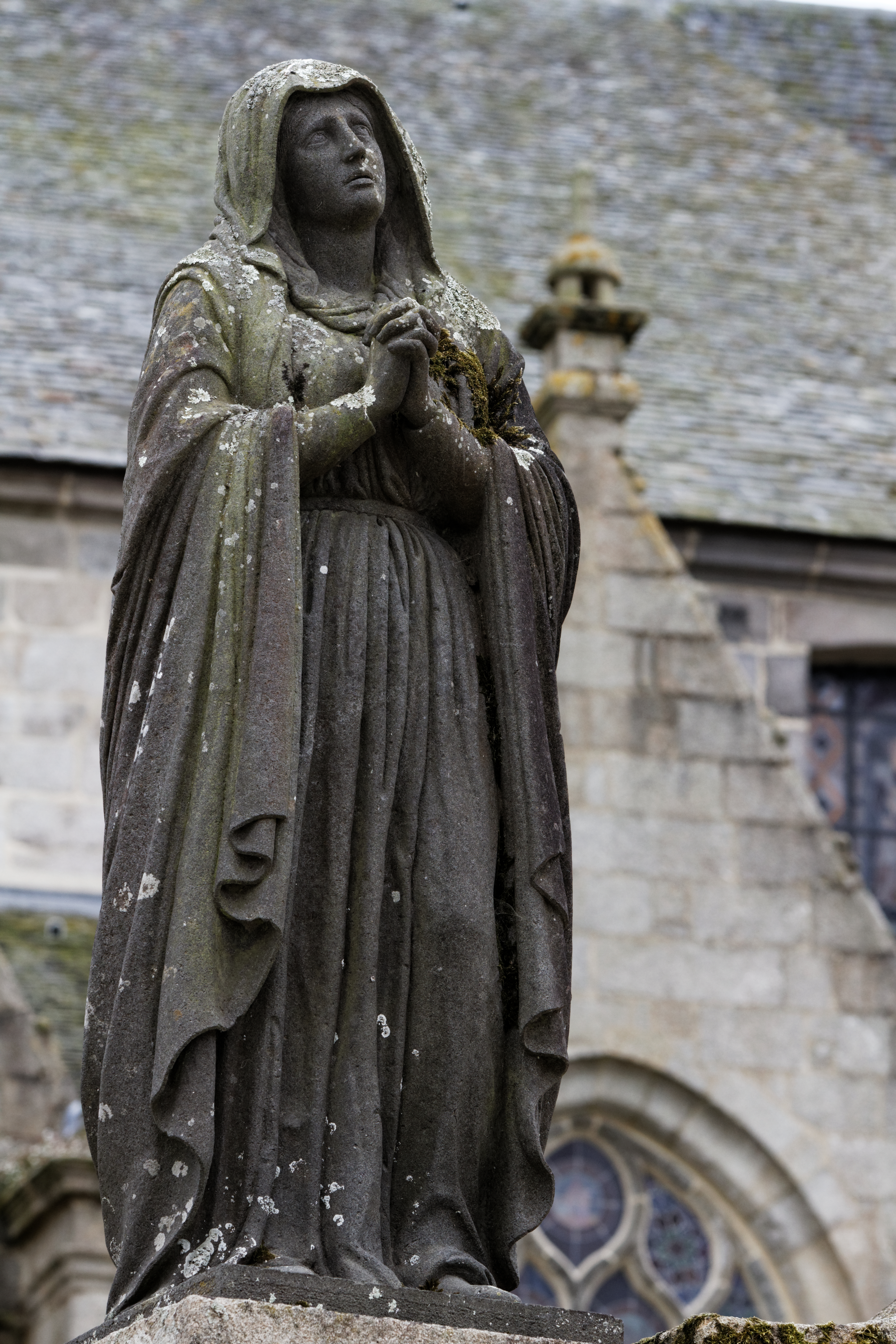
The Virgin Mary looks up towards Jesus on the cross- The Larhantec calvary at Saint-Thégonnec

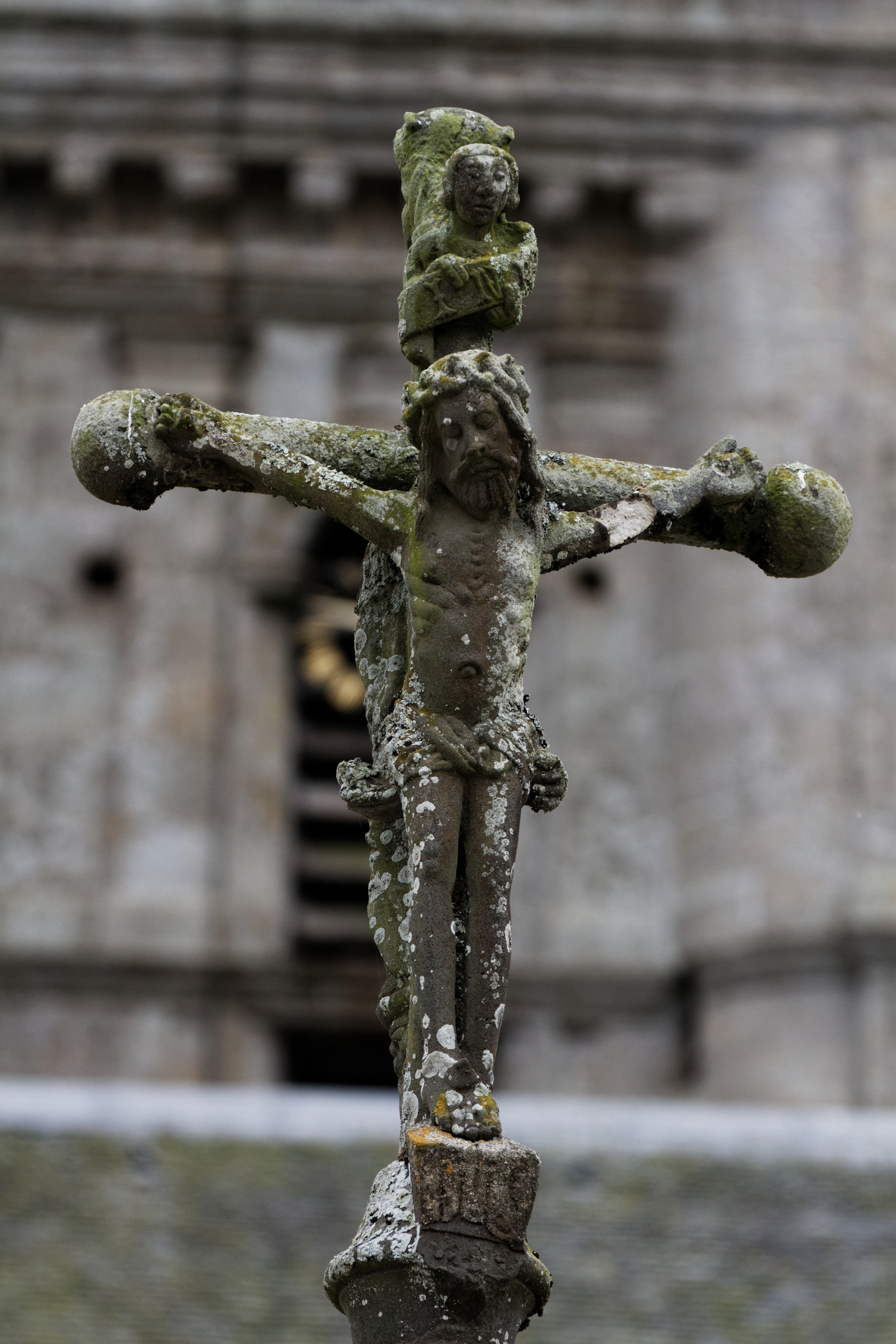
Jesus on the cross-The Larhantec calvary at Saint-Thégonnec

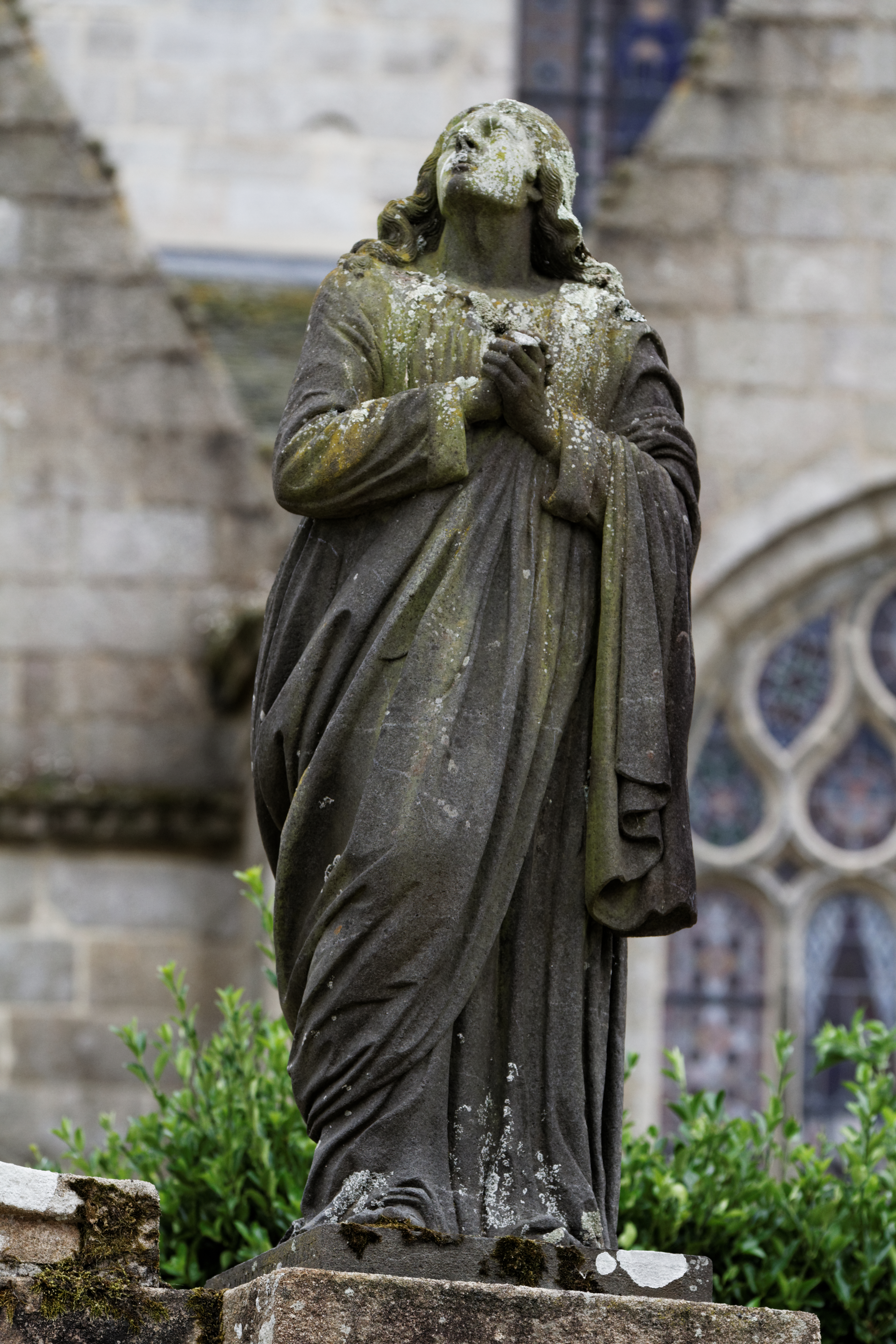
John the Evangelist looks up towards Jesus on the cross-The Larhantec calvary at Saint-Thégonnec

== The altarpiece of the Virgin Mary with baby Jesus ==
The altarpiece of the Virgin Mary is described as either a triptych or a "niche à volets", which translates as a "shuttered niche". In the niche itself is a depiction of the Virgin Mary surrounded by a representation of the Tree of Jesse. The branches of the tree can be seen below the Virgin Mary and as they spread upwards on the left and the right we see depictions of Jesus' ancestors . On the sides of the triptych or the "shutters", are paintings depicting scenes from the life of Jesus, the annunciation, the visitation, the announcement to the shepherds, the presentation of the baby Jesus to the visitors to the stable and the adoration of the three kings.

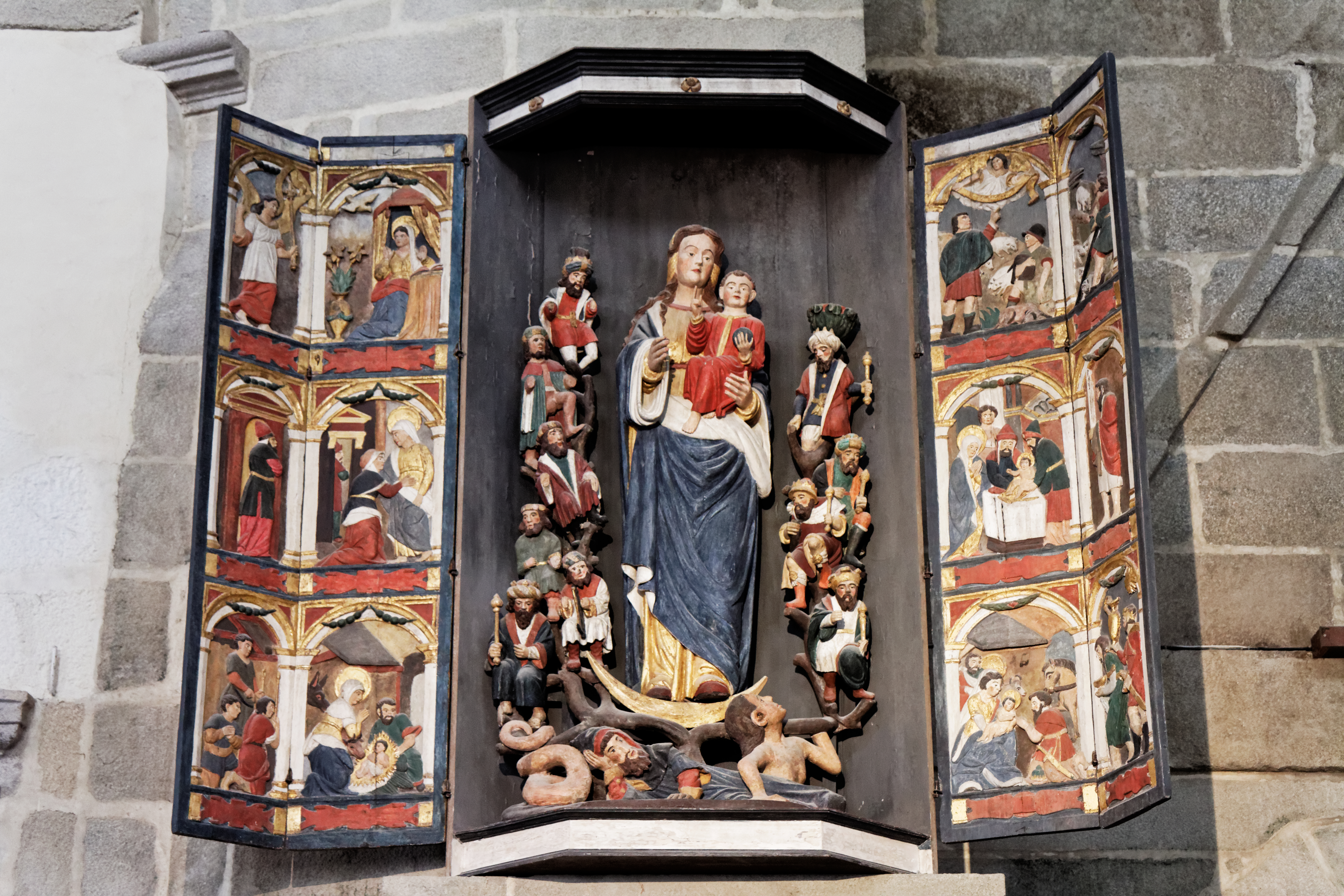
The Virgin Mary with child altarpiece or "shuttered niche"

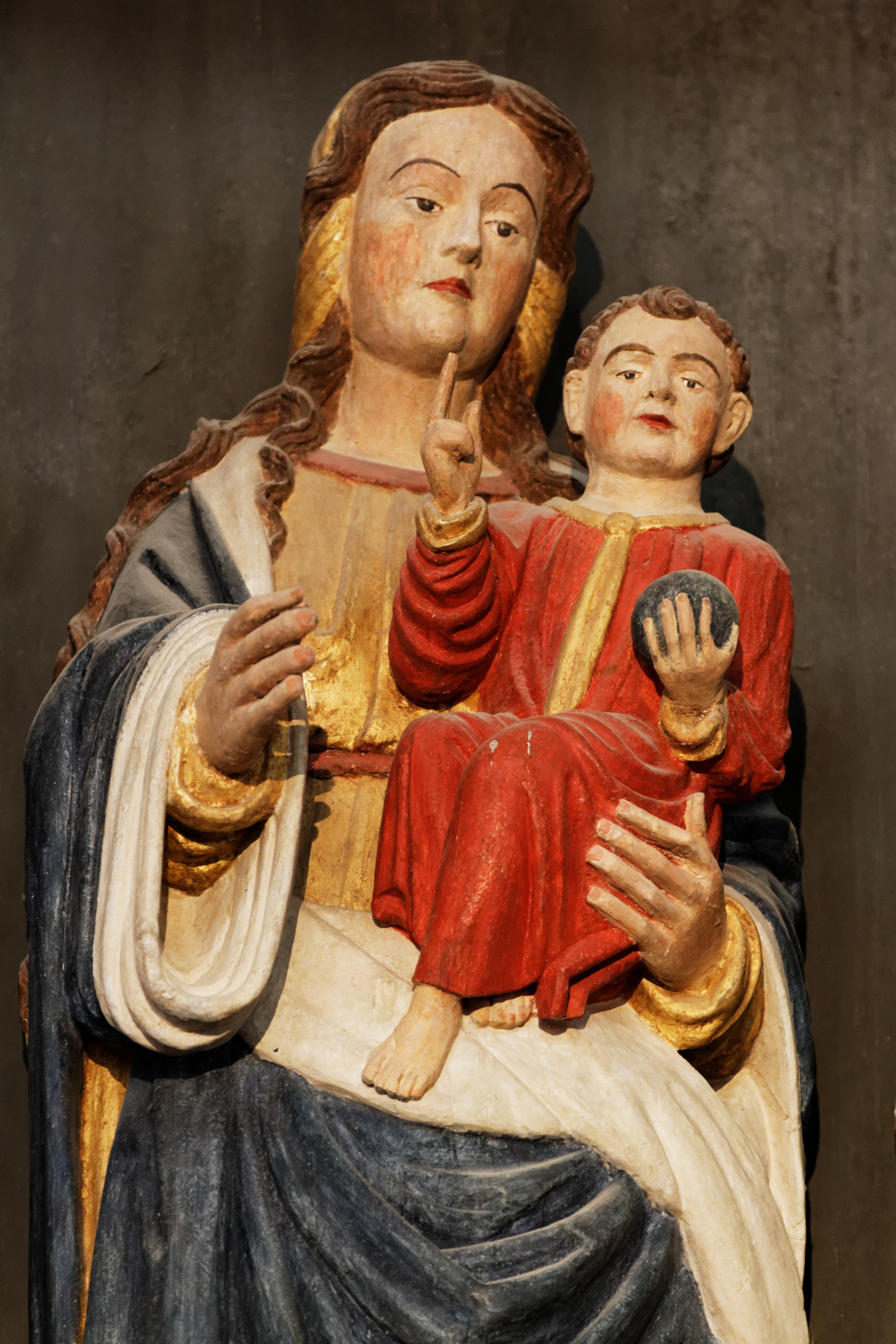
Close-up of the Virgin Mary with baby Jesus.

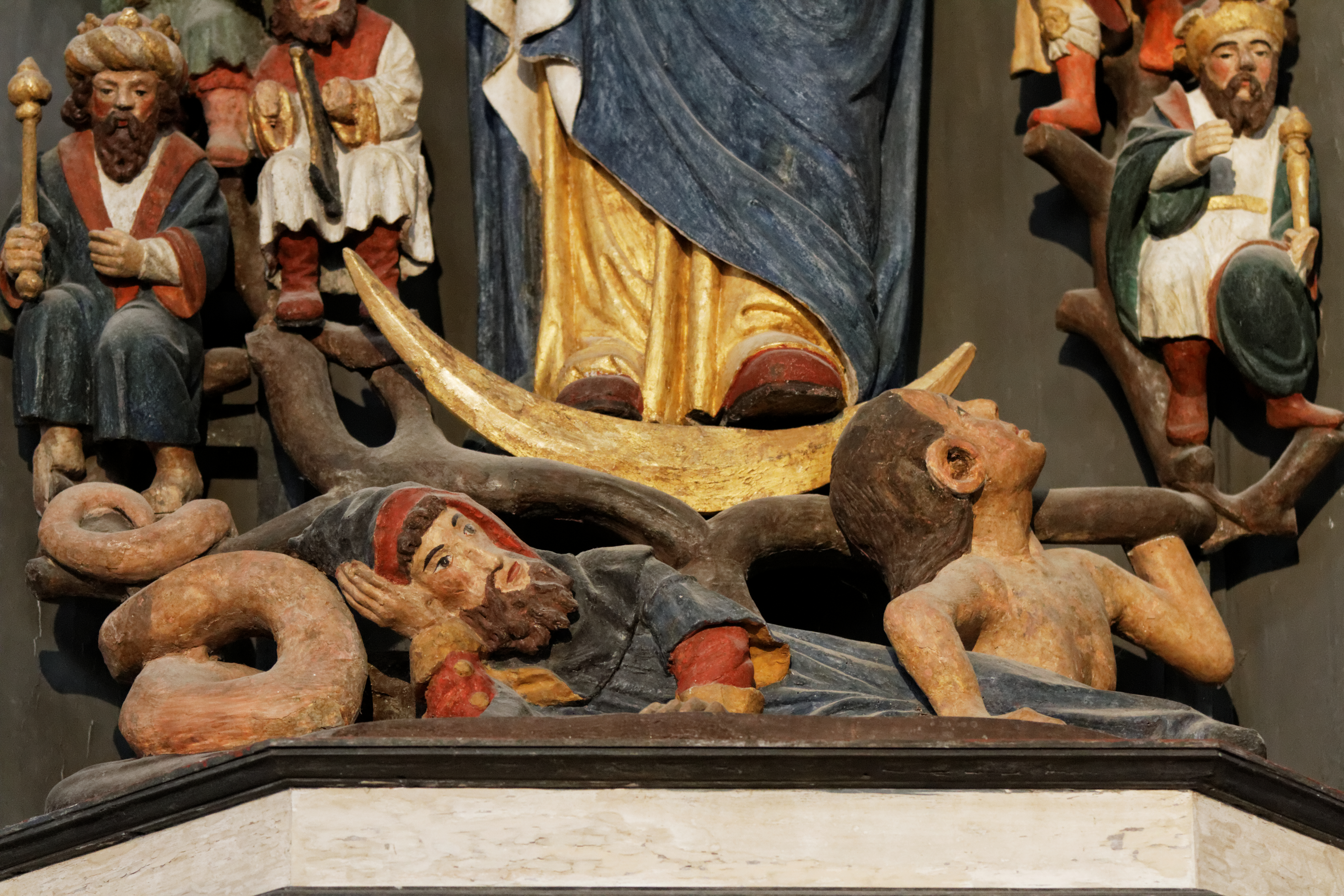
Below the Virgin Mary we see the branches of the Tree of Jesse

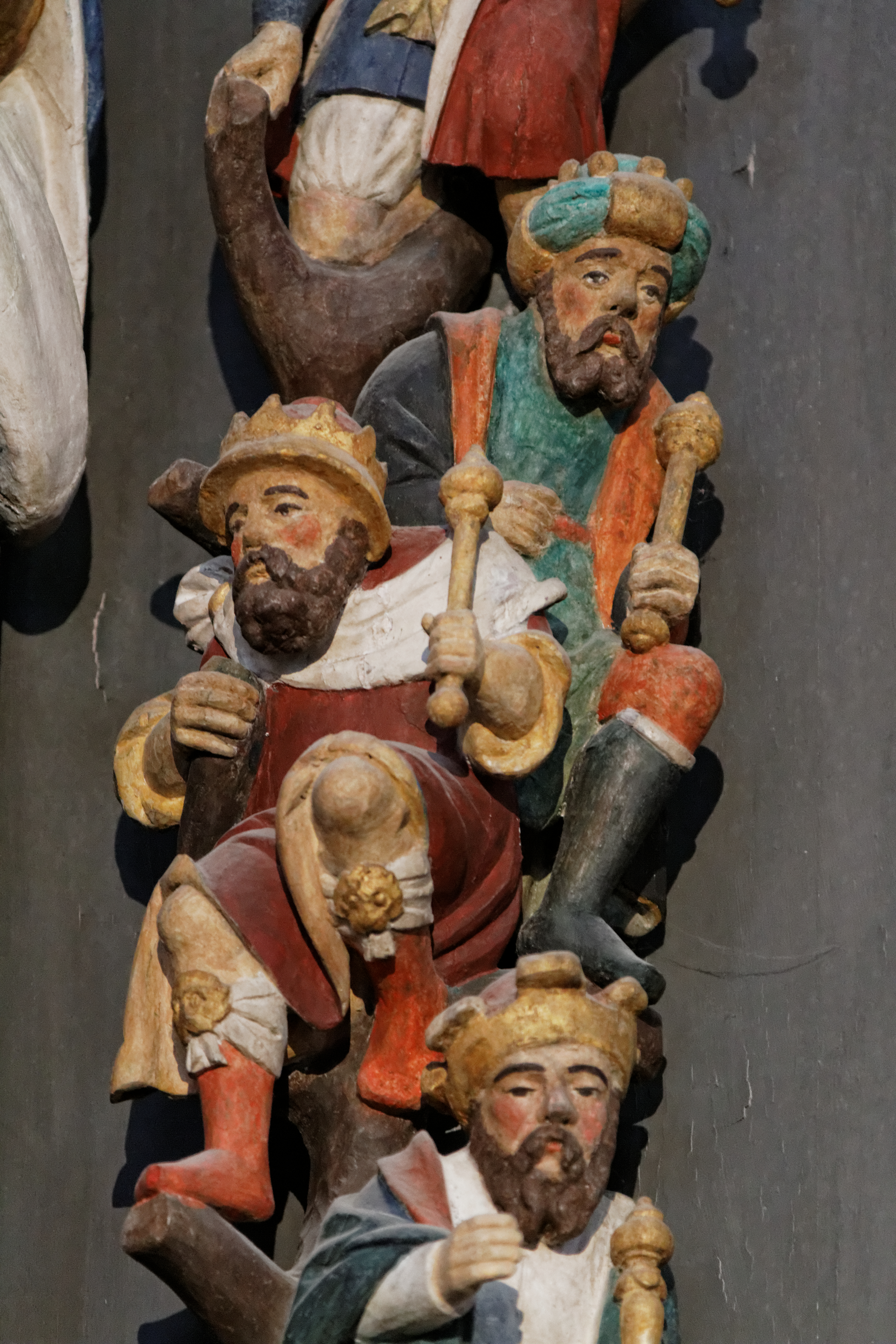
Some of Jesus' ancestors decorate the branches of the Tree of Jesse

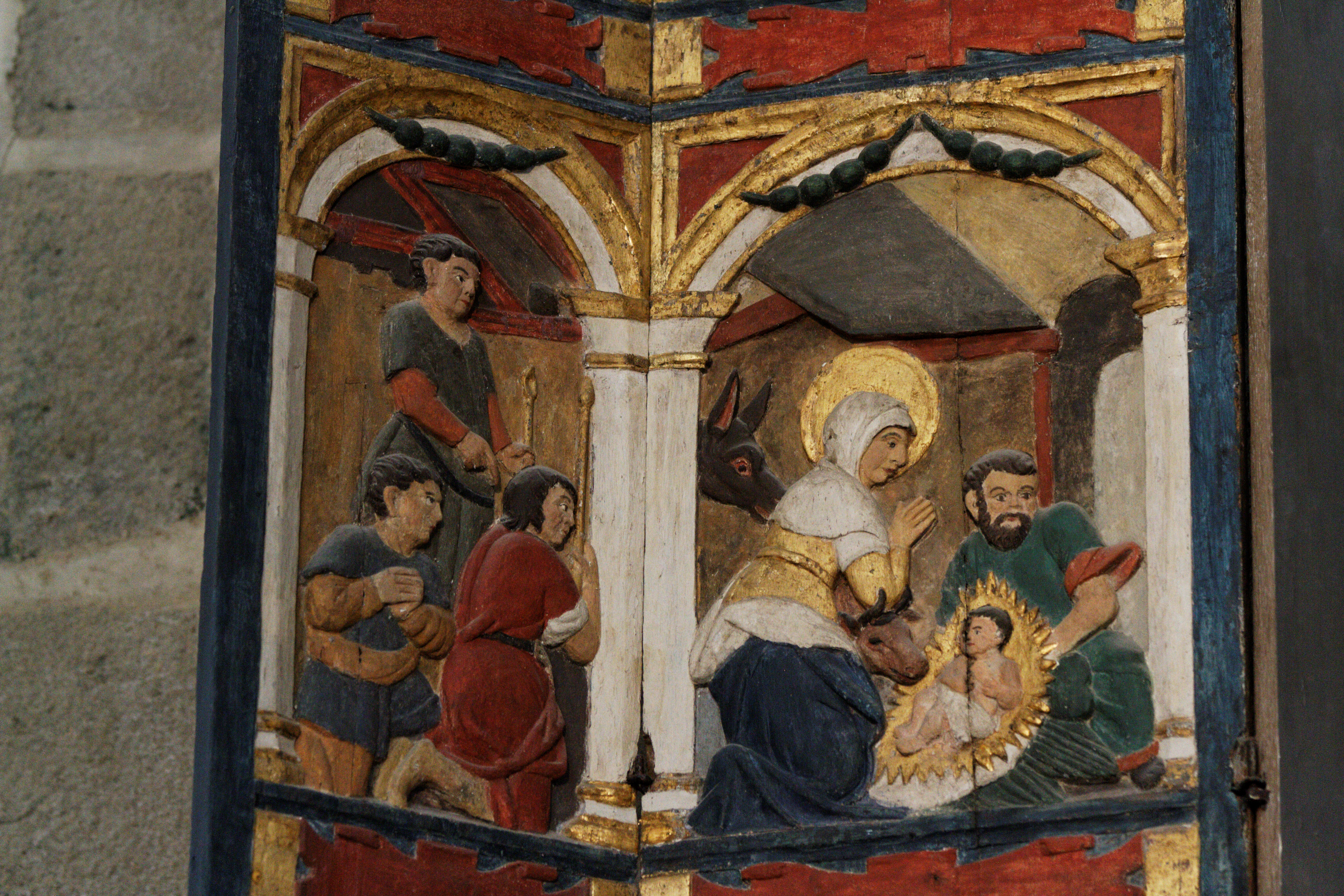
One of the paintings on the shutter. A scene showing the birth of Jesus

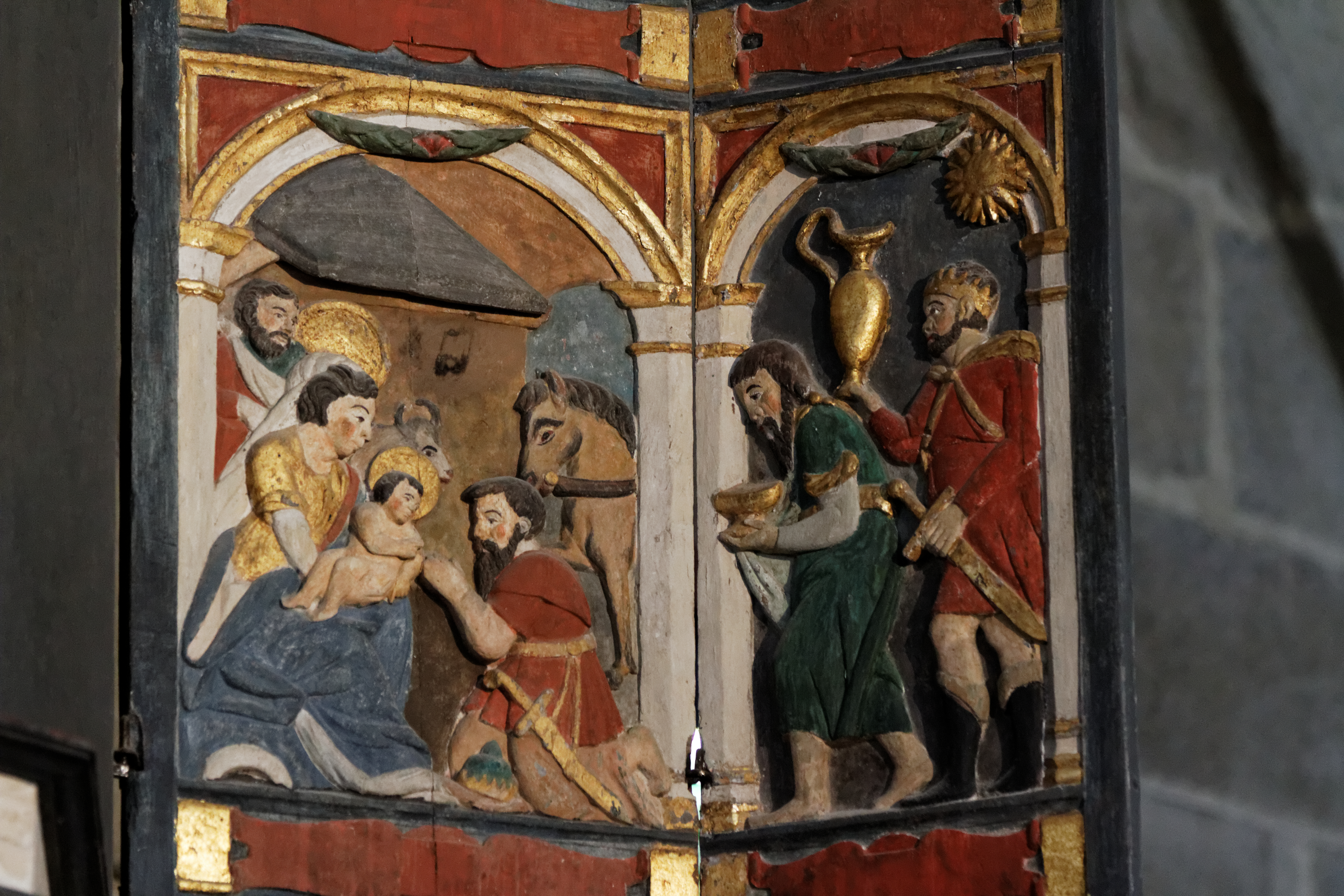
The three wise kings come bearing gifts. Another scene on the shutters of the altarpiece.

== The Saint Thégonnec triptych ==
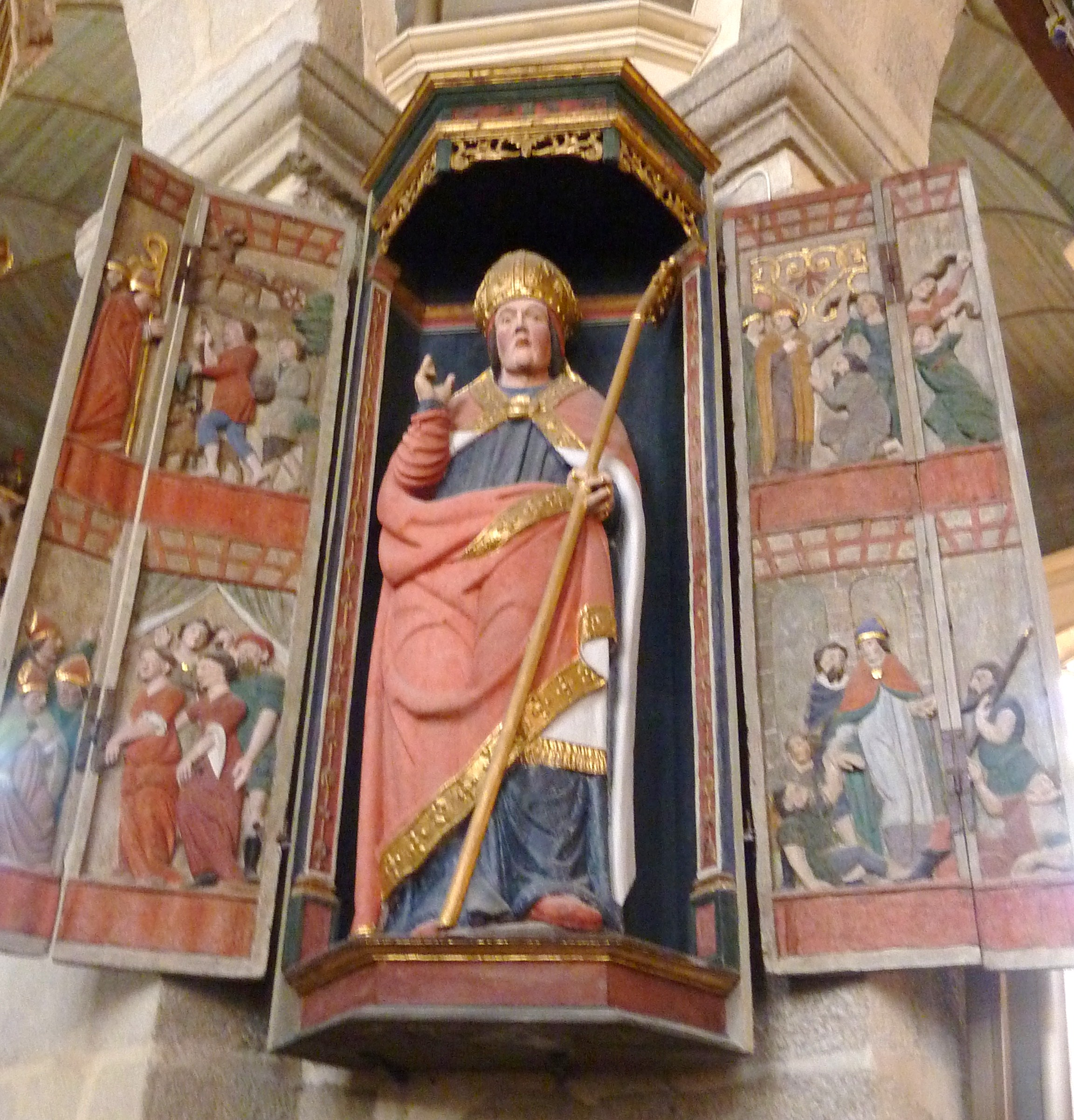
The Saint Thégonnec triptych

A similar shuttered niche or triptych features Saint Thégonnec with scenes from his life painted on the shutters.

== The pulpit ("La chaire à prêcher") ==
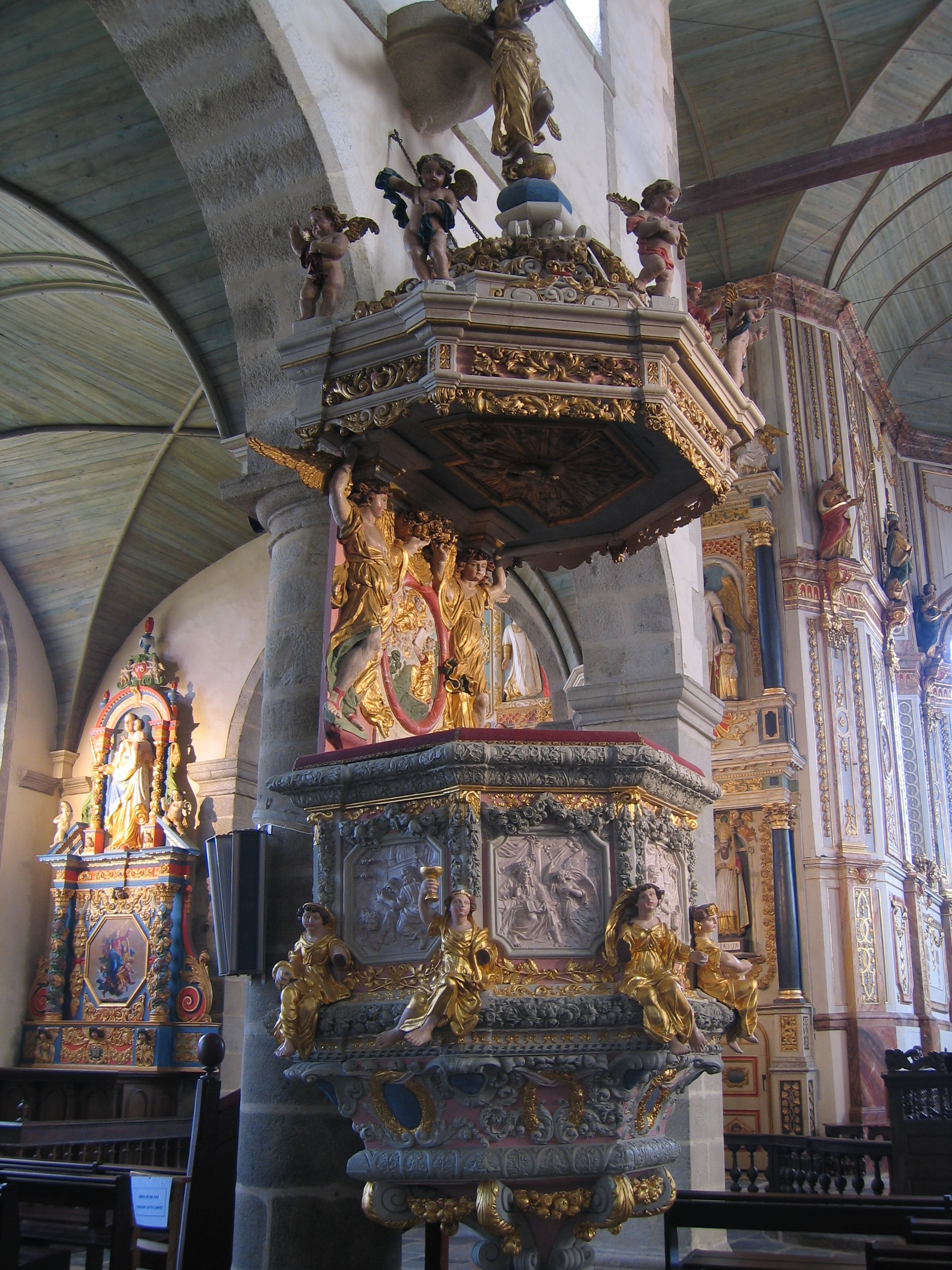
The ornate pulpit in the Notre-Dame church at Saint-Thégonnec is attributed to the Landivisiau sculptors Larrel. Carvings include depictions of the cardinal virtues, the Four Evangelists with their attributes (Mark the Evangelist with lion, Matthew the Evangelist with an angel, Luke the Evangelist with an ox and John the Evangelist with an eagle, the Doctors of the church, Saint Gregory the Great, Saint Ambrose, Saint Augustine and Saint Jerome, and Moses receiving the tablets (Ten Commandments)

The baroque pulpit in the Notre-Dame church at St Thégonnec dates to 1683 and was the work of the sculptors François and Guillaume Lerrel, father and son, from Landivisiau. They carved four female Caryatides representing the Cardinal virtues; Prudence, Temperance, Justice and Fortitude to support the canopy and added panels depicting the Four Evangelists with their attributes around the base. Further relief panels decorate the balustrade of the stairway these depicting the Church Fathers of the Western church, Ambrose, Jerome, Augustine and Saint Gregory the Great. He also added a relief panel depicting Moses receiving the Ten Commandments to the area between the caryatides. Many angels are included in the decoration and at the summit a "renommé" stands a foot poised on a globe and playing a trumpet. The sounding board ("l'abat-voix") is positioned behind the pulpit and dates to 1722.

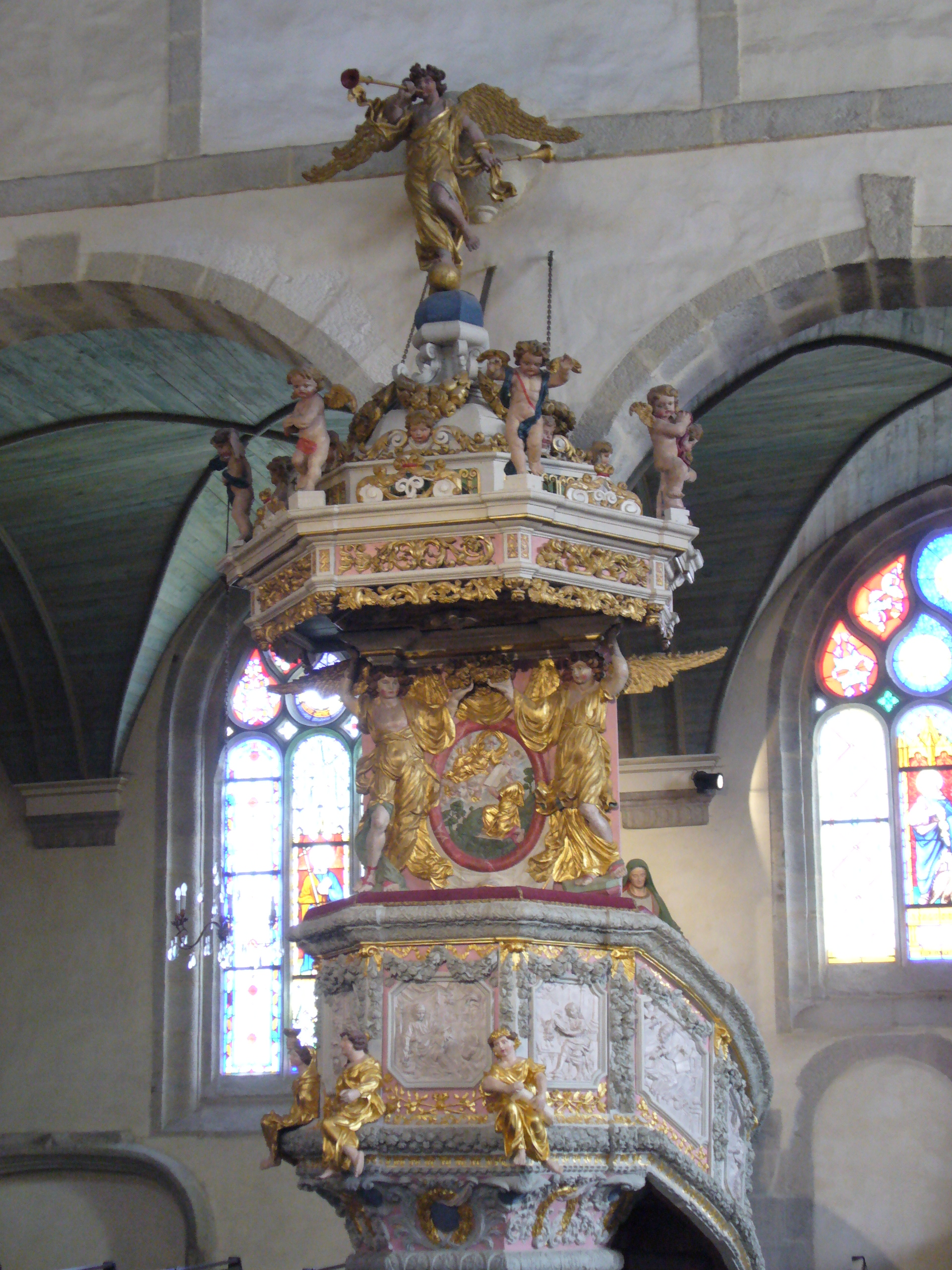
A view of the pulpit

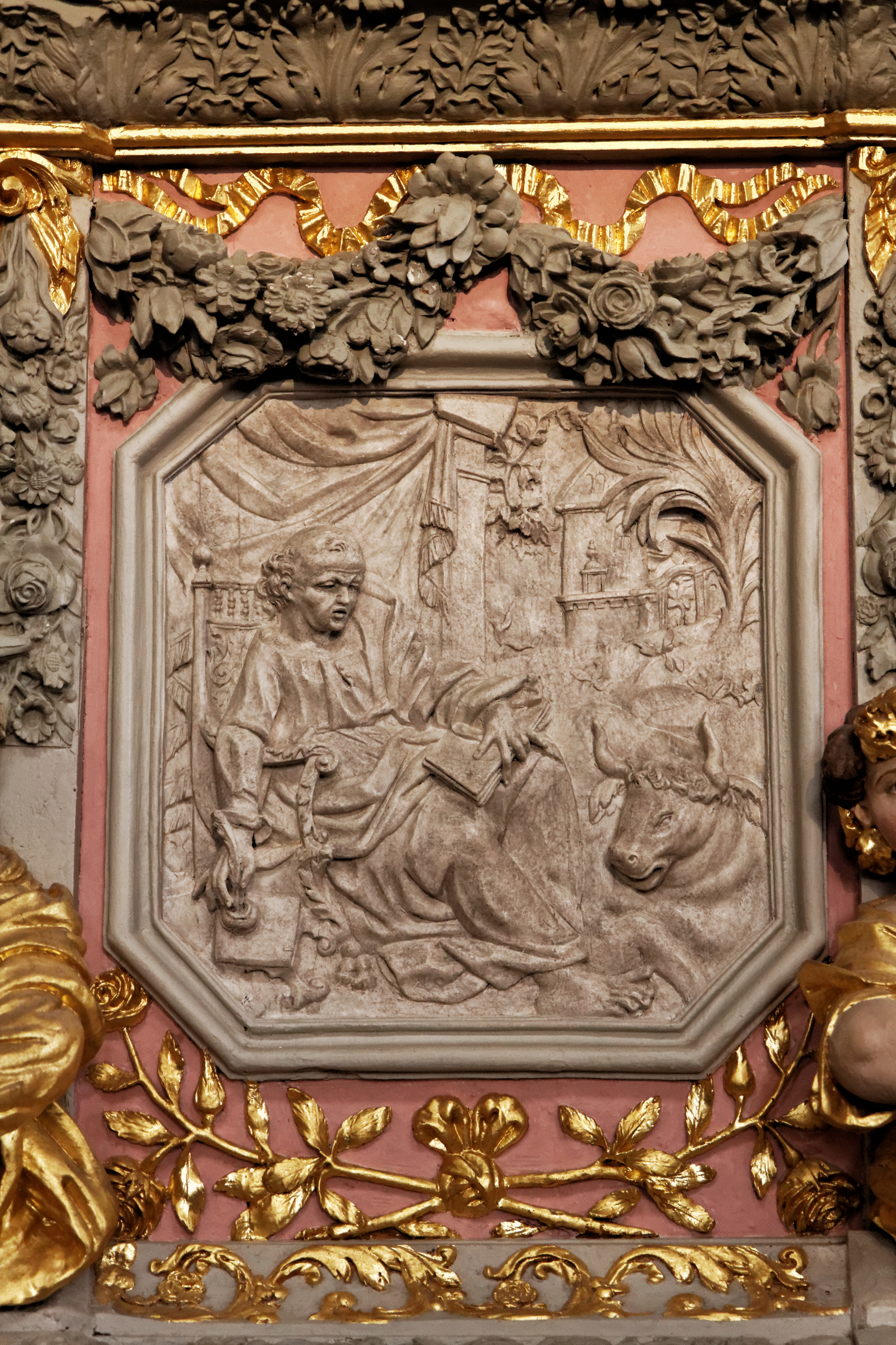
Panel depicting Luke the Evangelist decorating the pulpit. He is accompanied by his attribute the ox

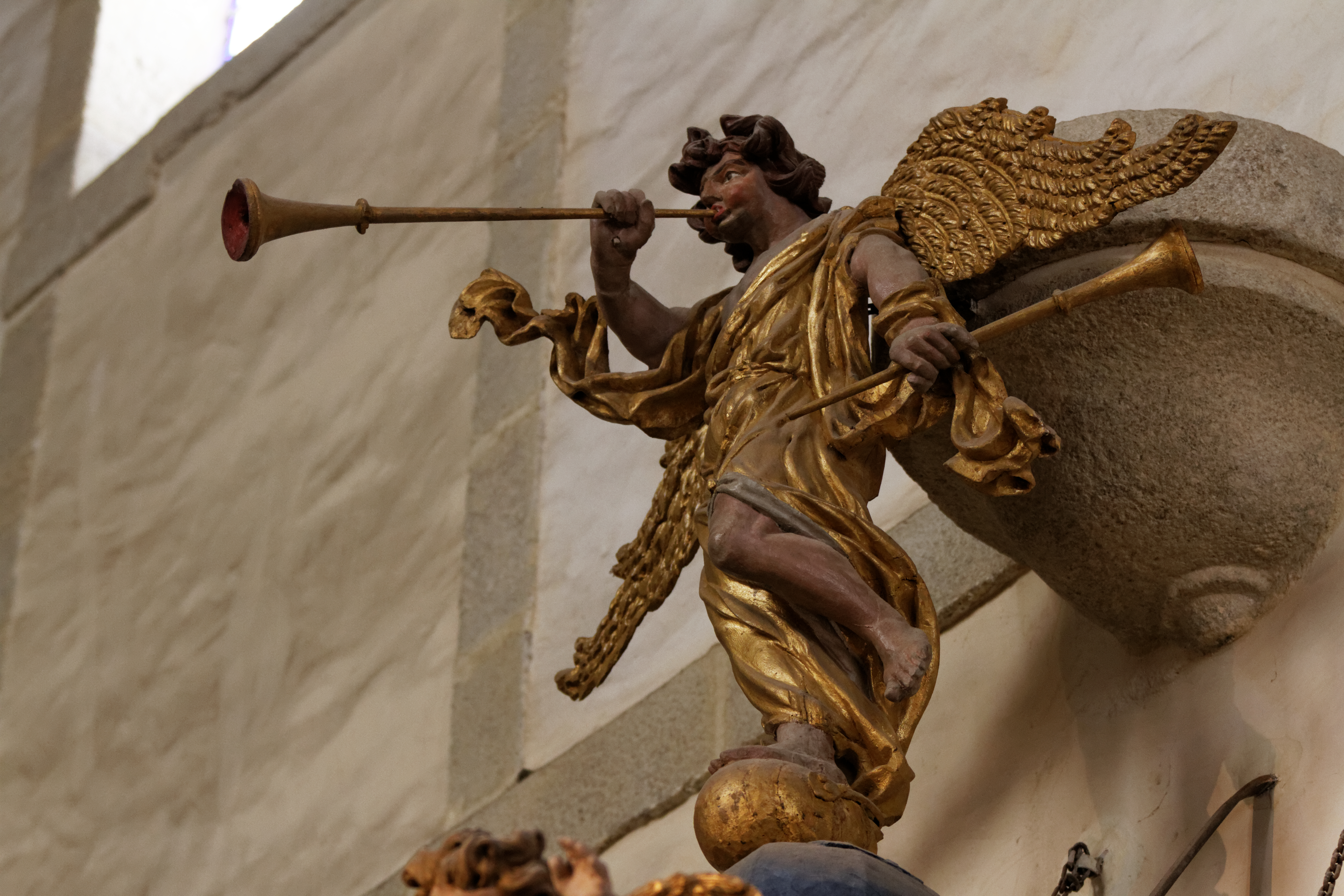
The "renommé" at the summit of the pulpit canopy plays a trumpet, her foot resting on a globe

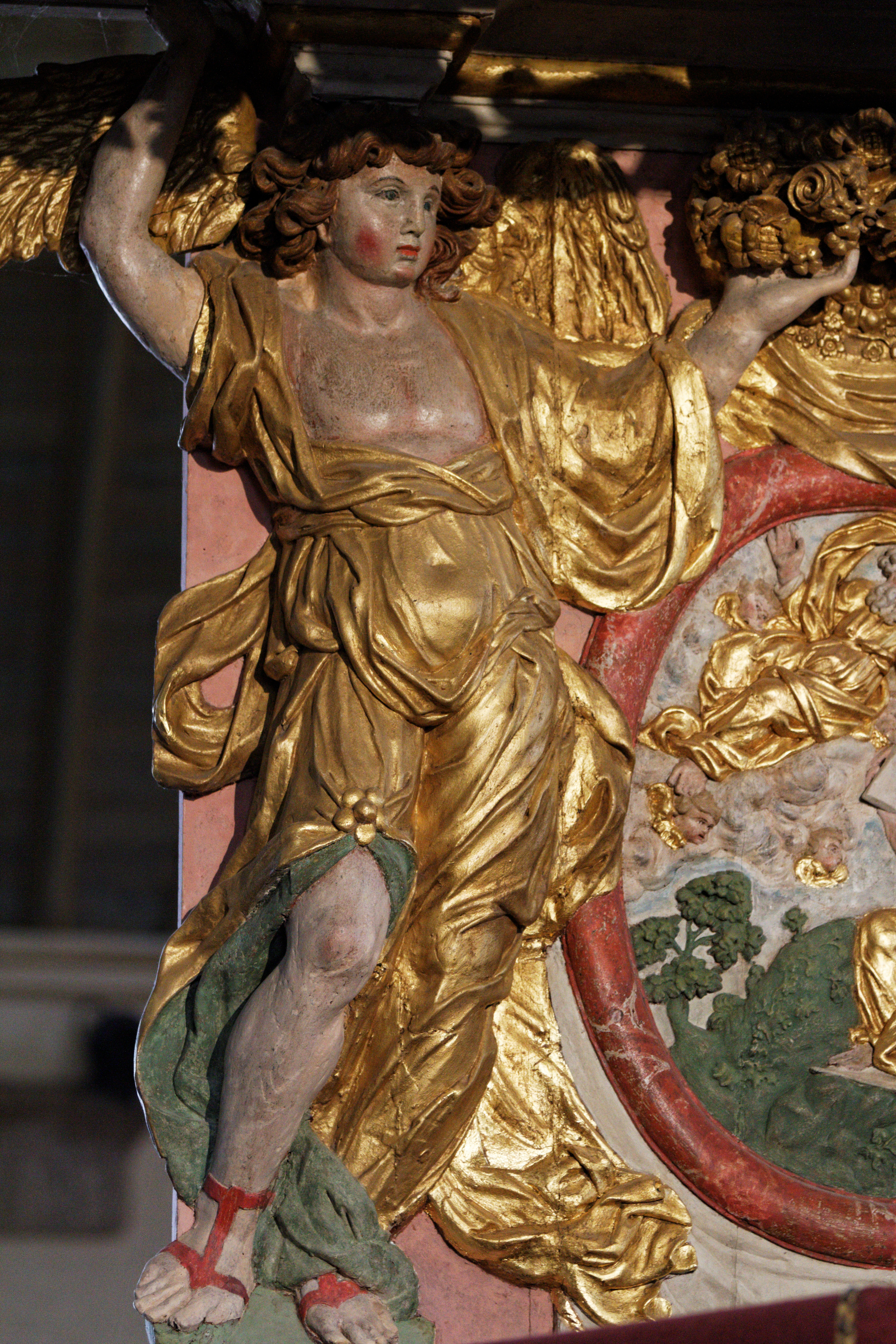
One of the caryatides supporting the pulpit canopy

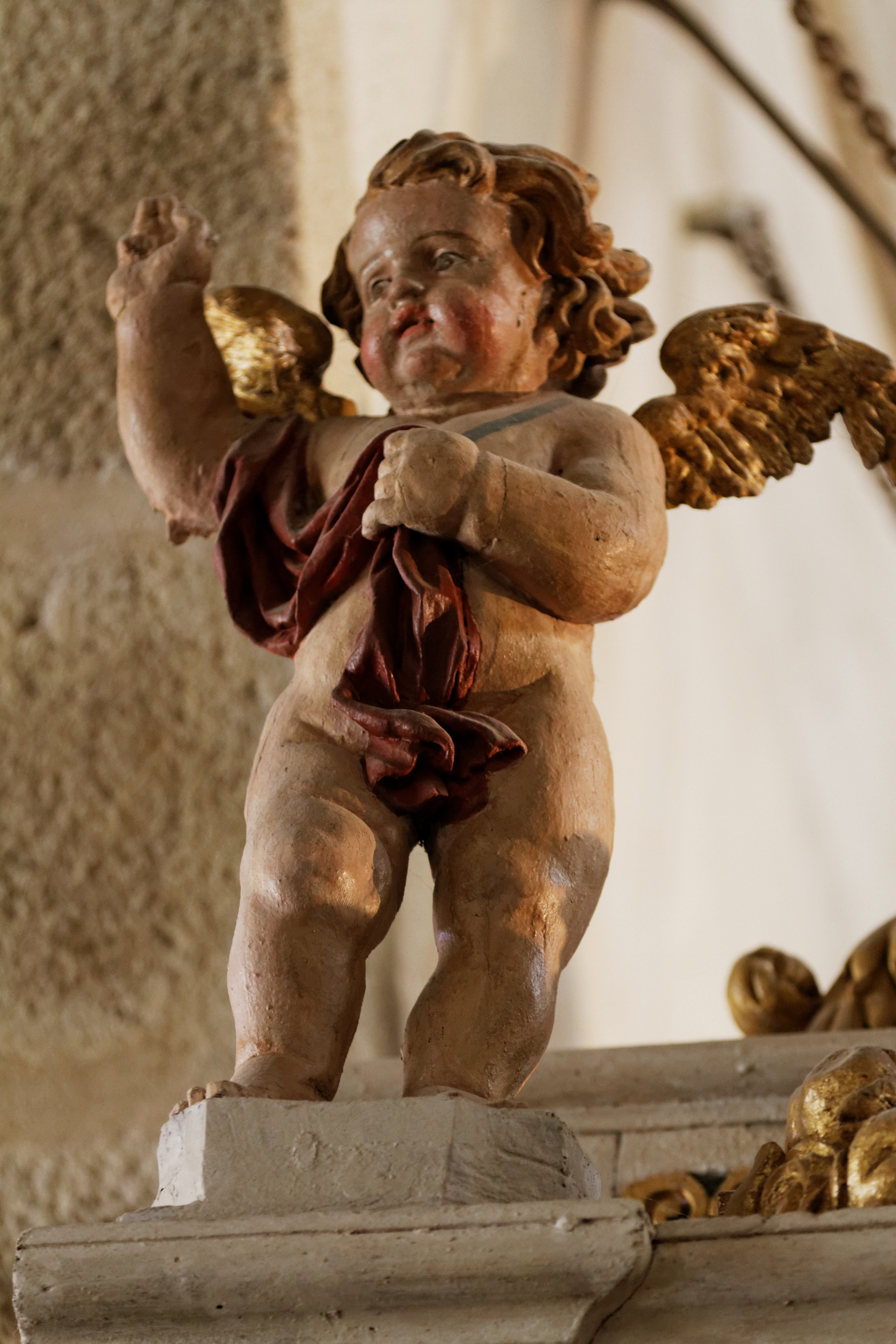
Cherub decorating the baroque pulpit at the Notre-Dame church at Saint Thégonnec

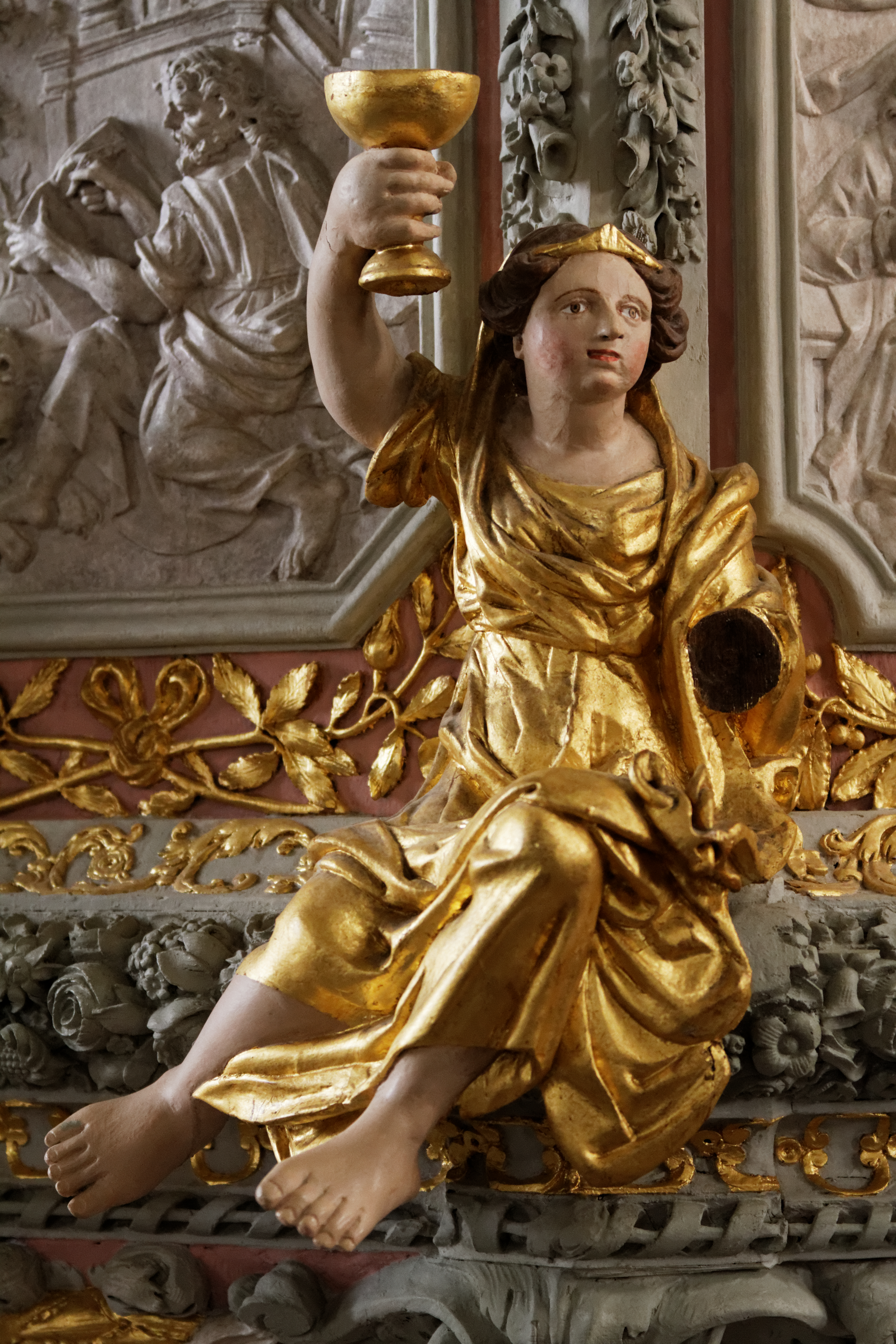
Another of the caryatides supporting the pulpit canopy.

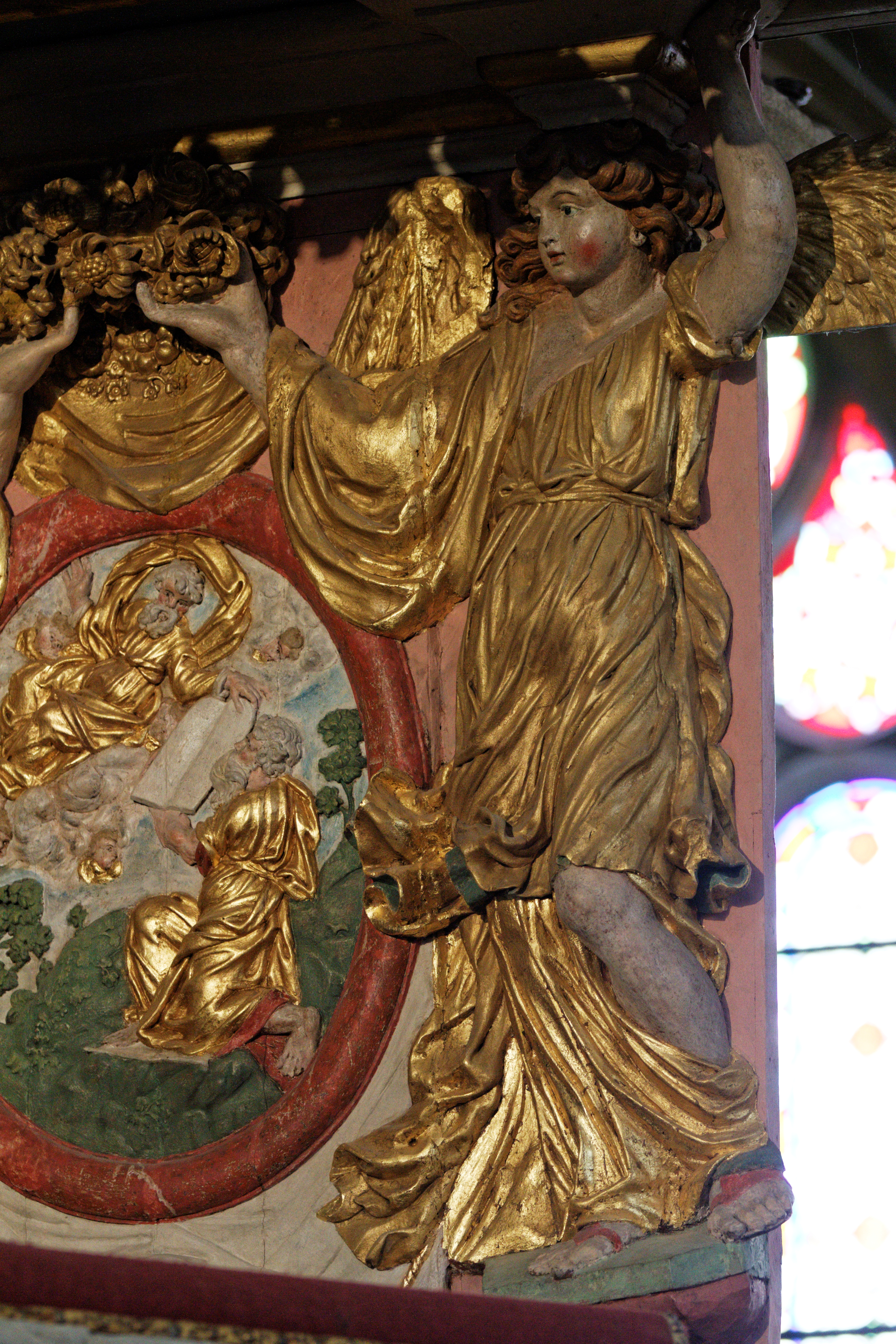
Another of the caryatides. Here we are afforded a good view of the tableau showing Moses receiving the ten commandments

== Altarpiece of "Saint-Sacrement" ==
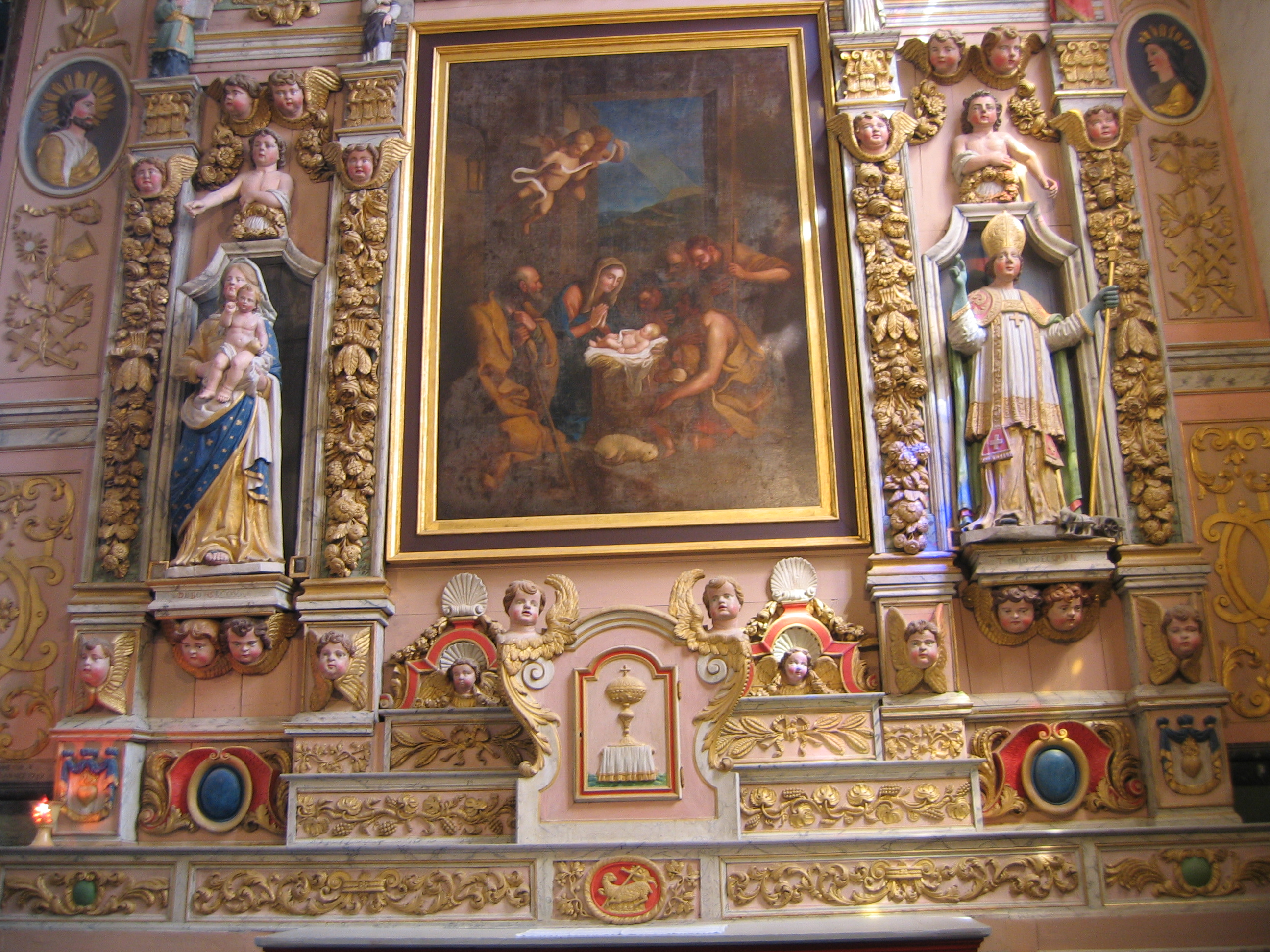
View of Saint-Sacrement altarpiece

The altarpiece above the altar of Saint-Sacrement, today the altar of Sacré-Coeur, was the work of Gabriel Carquain and was originally made in 1662 for the master-altar. It was placed in its present location in 1724 but after various additions. The subject of the altarpiece is the adoration of Jesus by the angels and a painting depicts the nativity and in the corners of the altar are statues of the Virgin Mary and Saint Thégonnec.

== The "Rosary" altarpiece (Retable du Rosaire) ==
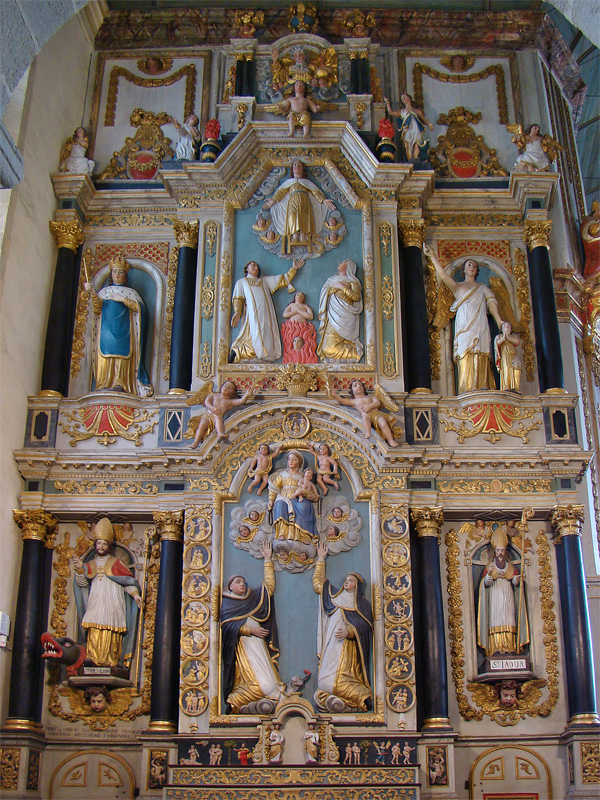
The "Rosary" altarpiece. Notre-Dame Church in Saint-Thégonnec, Finistère, Bretagne, France. Commissioned in 1697 to Jacques Laispagnol and gilded in 1700 by Gilles Bunel, both from Morlaix. In the upper section the statue of Saint Louis is on the left and an angel with a child on the right, these statues on either side of a tableau depicting purgatory. In the lower section are statues of Saint Paull and Saint Jaoua with the tableau depicting the Virgin Mary handing down the rosary to Saint Dominic and Catherine of Siena in the centre

The "Rosary" altarpiece is located in the north transept. The lower section dates from 1696 to 1698 and was the work of Jacques Lespaignol with gilding being carried out in 1700 by Gilles Brunel a Morlaix master gilder. It was enlarged in 1734 by a Guimilliau carpenter Jean Laurent who created the upper section. In 1697 official approval was given to replace the existing Rosary altarpiece as the parishioners thought it too modest. Sculptors in Quimper, Morlaix and other locations were consulted and Jacques Lespaignol, the main sculptor used by the parish of Saint-Melaine, was given the commission. A Morlaix painter called Alain Bourriquen was commissioned to execute the tableau in the centre of the altarpiece and Gilles Bunol, a master gilder from Morlaix was charged with the altarpiece's gilding. Lespaignol was commissioned to execute the altarpiece from dry oak ("bois de chêne sec") and the various statues from chestnut ("Bois de châtaigne"). The columns were to be in black marble. The sculptural work and the gilding were finished in 1700. The planned statue of John the Evangelist was not proceeded with and a statue of Saint Jaoua was executed instead. The final altarpiece comprises a lower and an upper section. In the lower section are the statues of Saint Paul and Saunt Jaoua with the central tableau depicting the Virgin Mary, Saint Dominic and Catherine of Siena. The upper section of the altarpiece has a statue of Saint Louis and an angel holding the hand of a child and in the centre of this upper section there is a second tableau depicting purgatory; Christ, surrounded by angels, receives the souls which Saint Dominic and Catherine of Sienna have rescued from the flames of purgatory. The Holy Father is depicted at the very top of the altarpiece.

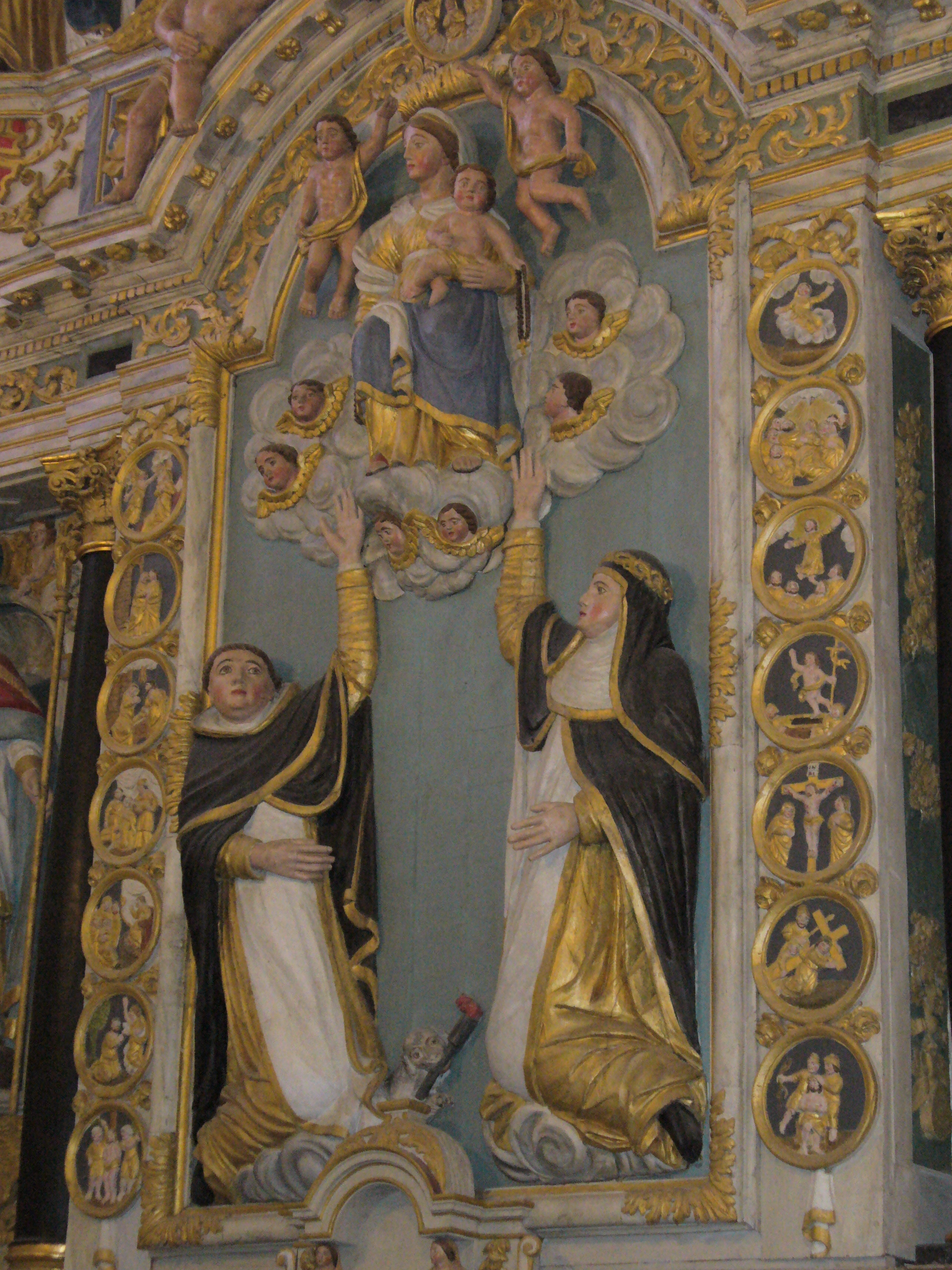
In the centre of the altarpiece's lower section, the Virgin Mary hands the rosary to Saint Dominic and Catherine of Sienna

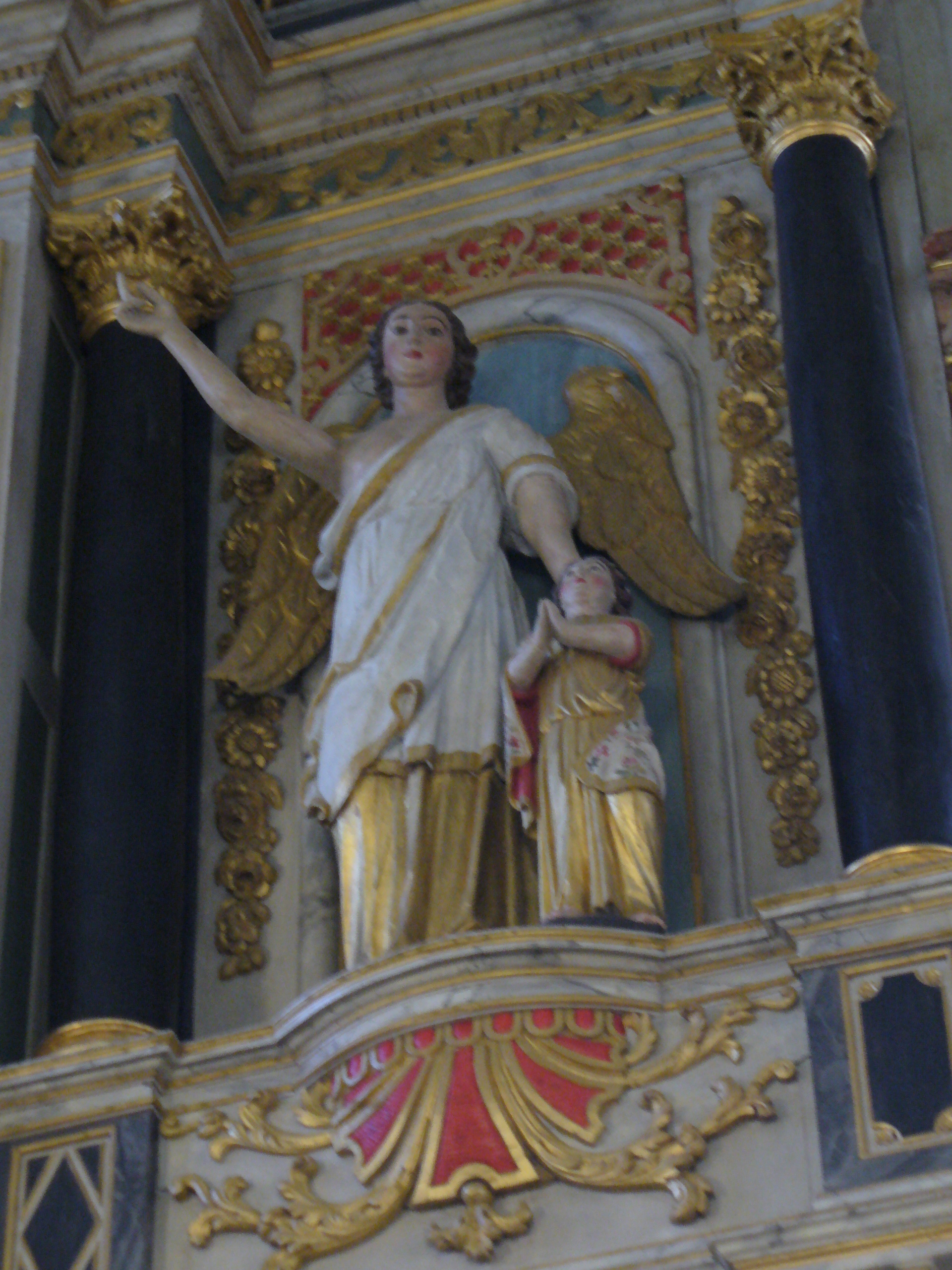
A winged angel holds the hand of a child. Part of the upper section of the Rosary altarpiece

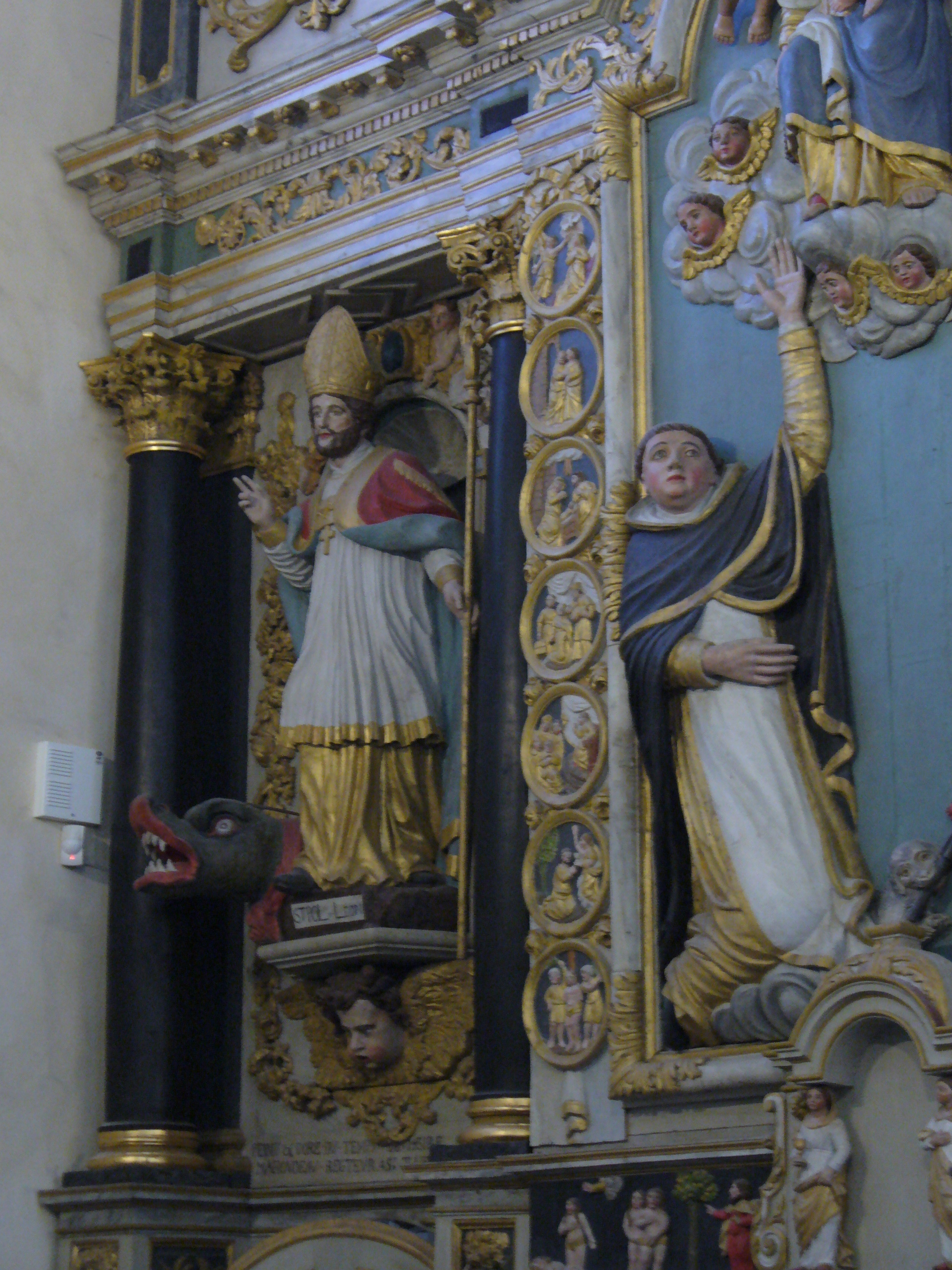
Statue of Pol de Léon

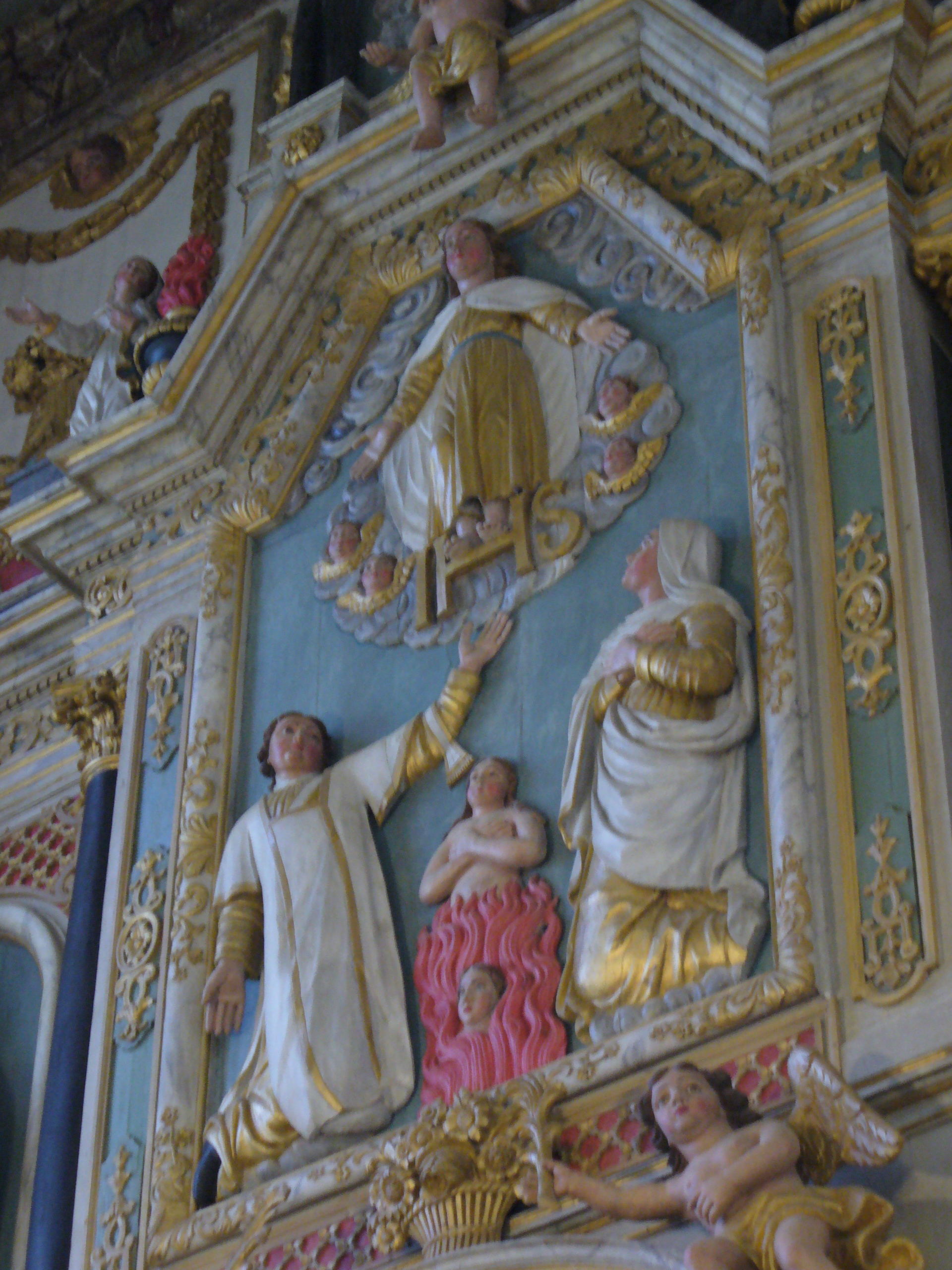
In the tableau in the centre of the altarpiece's upper section, Christ, surrounded by angels, receives the souls which Saint Dominic and Catherine of Sienna have rescued from the flames of purgatory

== Other altarpieces ==
The two other altarpieces in the church are the altarpiece dedicated to Saint John the Baptist and that dedicated to "Notre Dame du Vrai Secours". The latter was destroyed in the 1998 fire but a complete replica was made. The original statue of the Virgin Mary dated to 1668 and was attributed to Guillaume Bourricquen and the altarpiece also has a tableau depicting the Assumption with the Virgin Mary accompanied by angels.

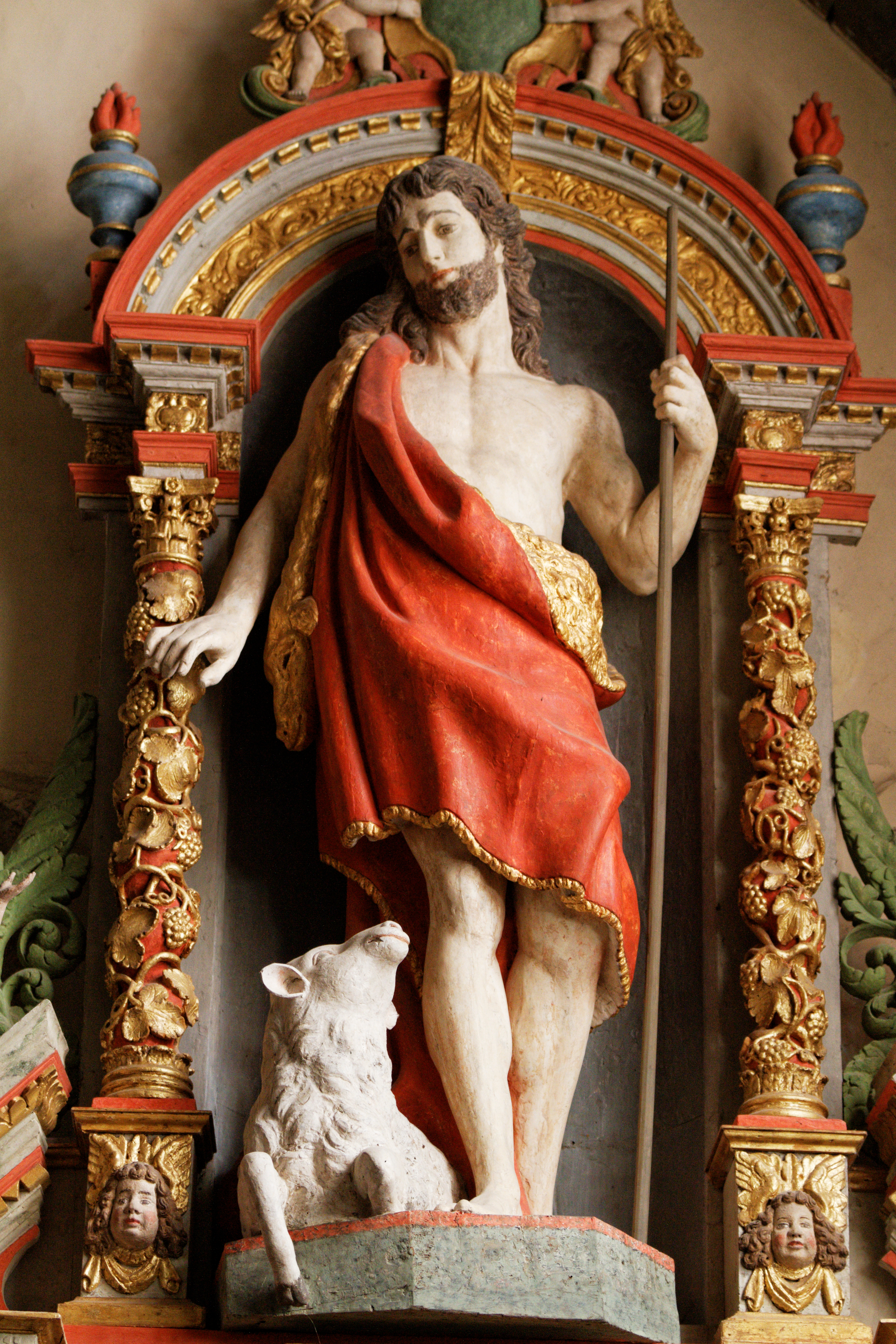
Part of the John the Baptist altarpiece

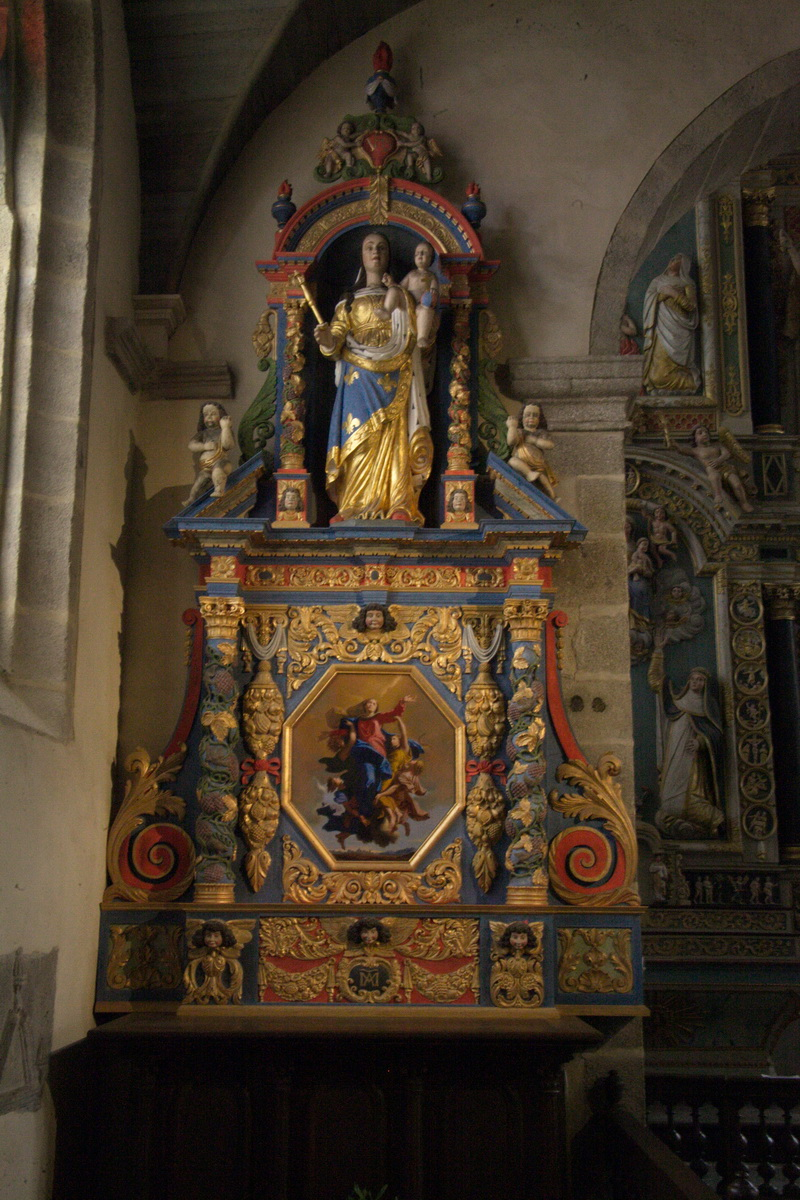
The altarpiece "Notre Dame du Vrai Secours"

== The ossuary ==
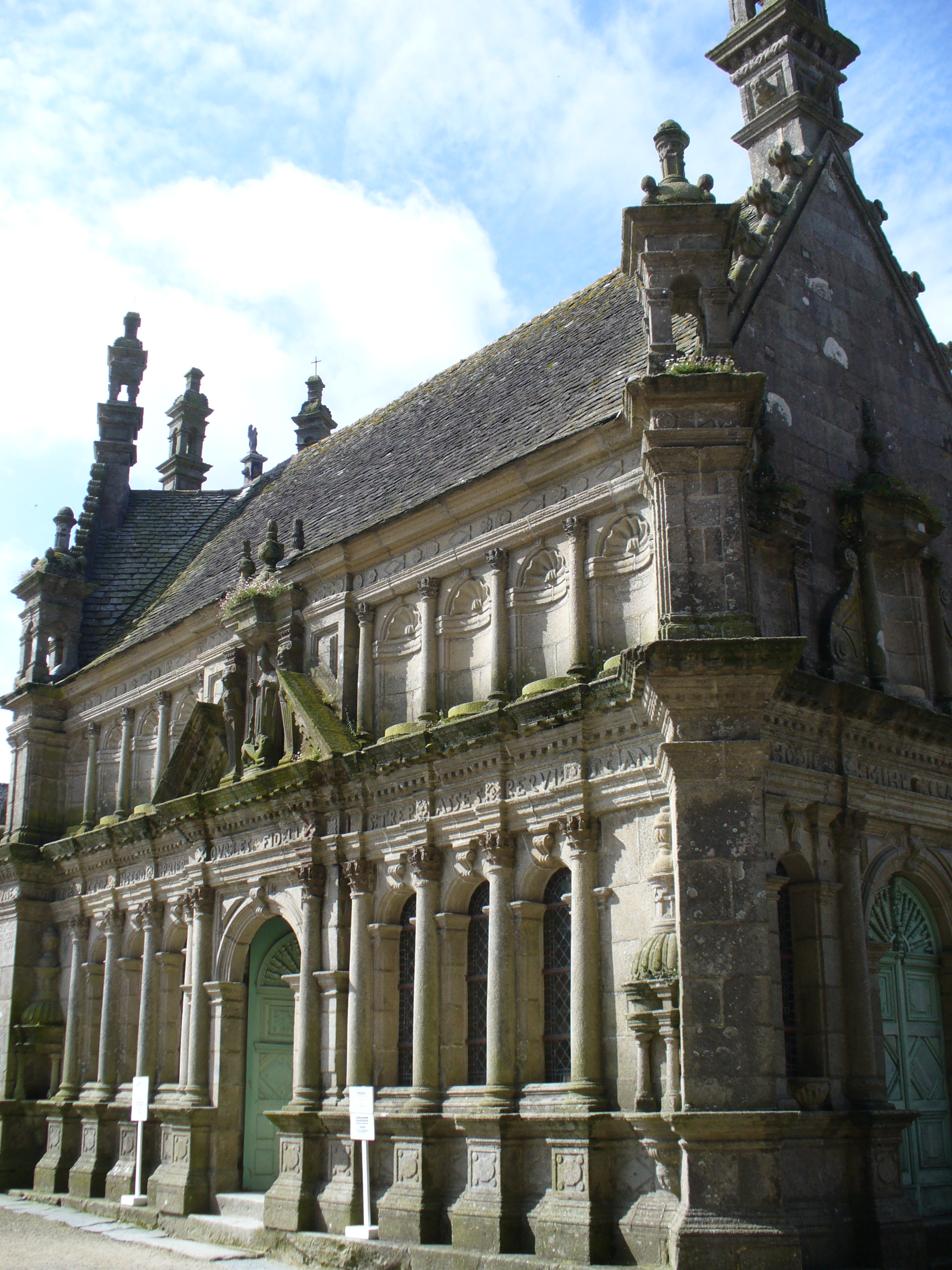
The ossuary at Saint-Thégonnec

The ossuary at Saint-Thégonnec stands to the left of the triumphal arch and was built between 1676 and 1682 by the architect Jean Le Bescont (1650-1685). The architecture is exuberant, with bell-turrets, windows and slender columns. At the front of the building there is a statue of Saint Pol Aurélien with the dragon he had captured and with two "termes gainé" on either side (also by Jean Le Bescont) and a silver Virgin Mary can be seen on the top of the roof by a small bell-tower. Inside the ossuary there is a 1685 altarpiece dedicated to Saint Joseph and in the crypt there is a spectacular "mise au Tombeau" by the sculptor Jacques Lespagnol. This "mise au tombeau" comprises a group of baroque polychromed sculptures carved from oak, depicting Jesus' body being prepared for burial. It was sculpted between 1699 and 1702 by the Morlaix sculptor Jacques Lespagnol. Lespagnol also worked on the church's "Rosary" altarpiece. In the "mise au tombeau", Lespagnol depicts eleven people expressing their emotions when confronted with death. We see Mary Salome and Mary Magdalene kneeling and then surrounding the corpse and from left to right, Nicodemus, Saint Veronica holding up her veil, the Virgin Mary, John the Evangelist, an angel holding a chalice and Joseph of Arimathea.

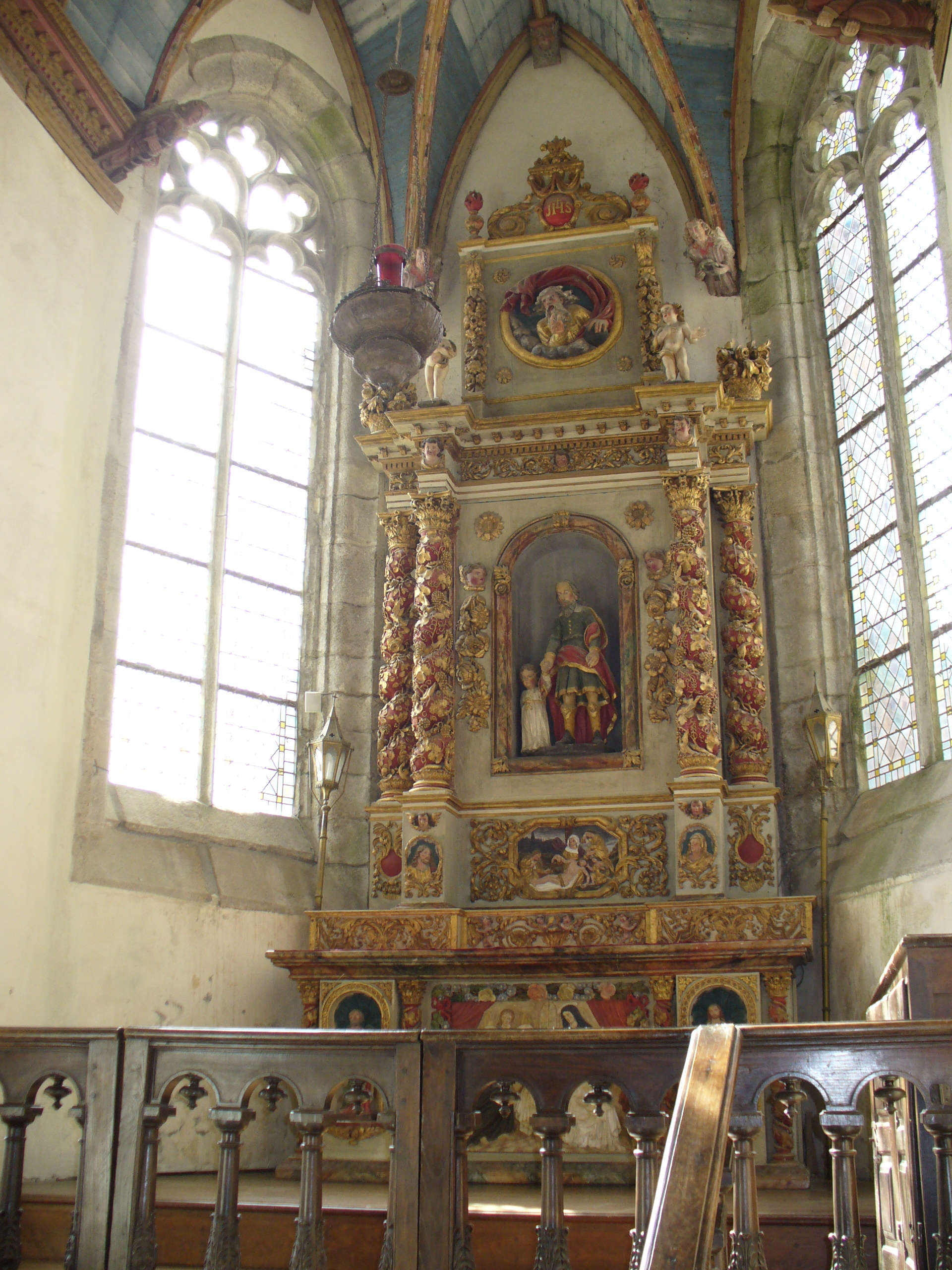
The altarpiece in the ossuary crypt

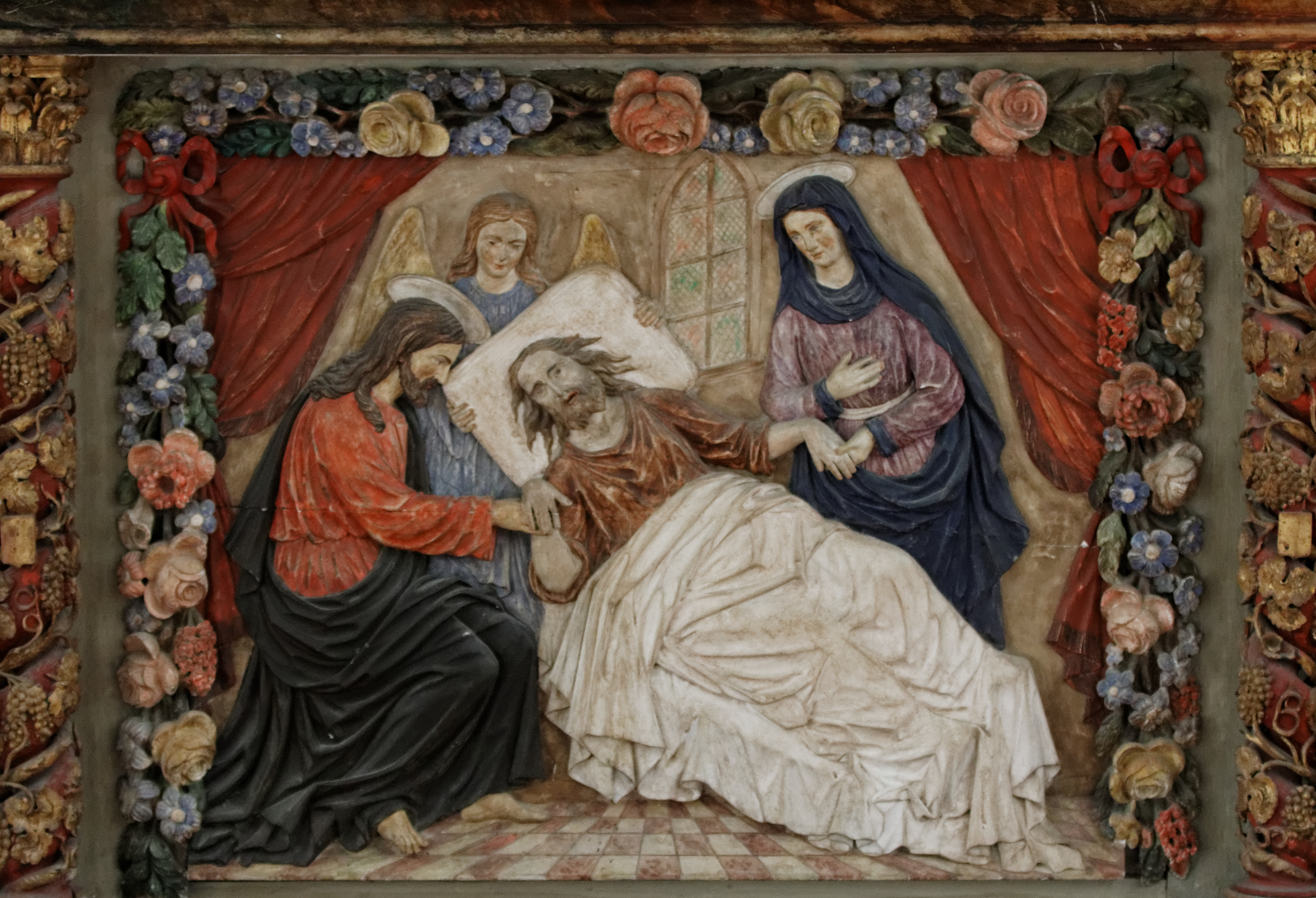
Detail from the altarpiece in the ossuary crypt

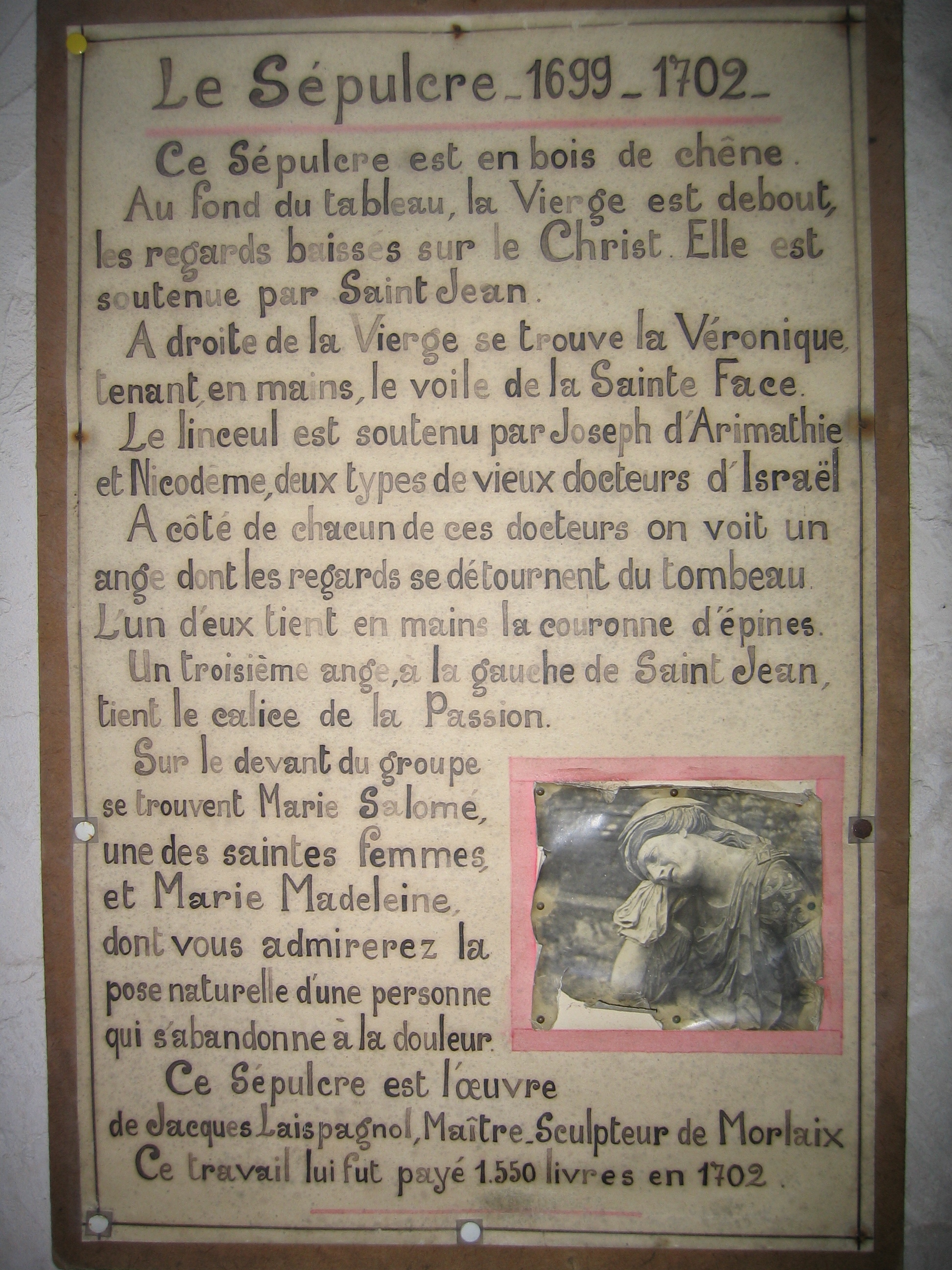
Notice giving background information on the "mise au tombeau"

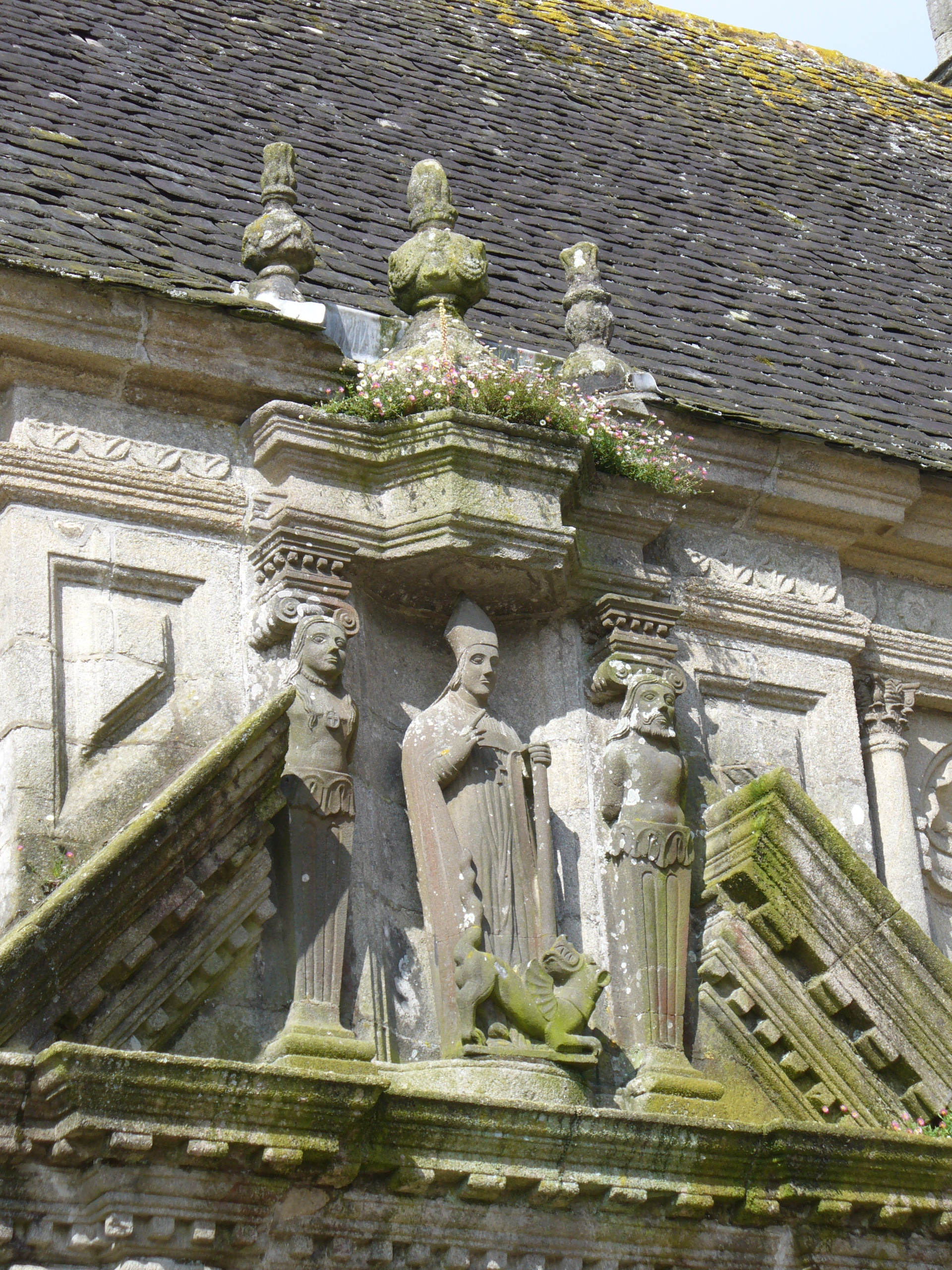
The sculpture over the ossuary entrance:Saint Pol Aurélien with the dragon he had captured and with two "termes gainé" on either side. A "termes gainé" is a sculptural device where the head is human but the body is in effect a carved pedestal.

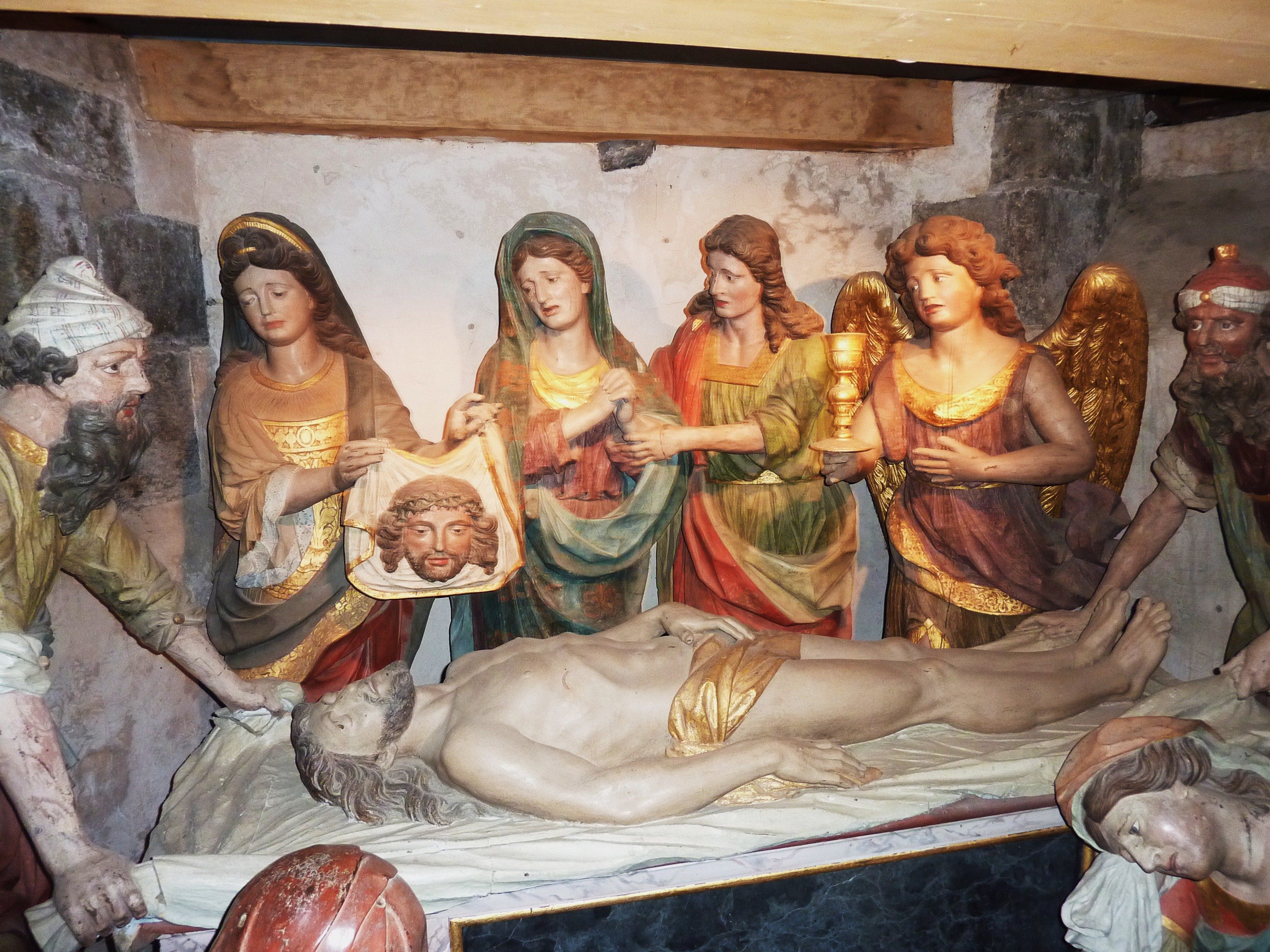
Jesus' body is prepared for burial. Jacques Lespagnol's moving "mise au tombeau" in the crypt of the Notre-Dame ossuary in Saint-Thégonnec

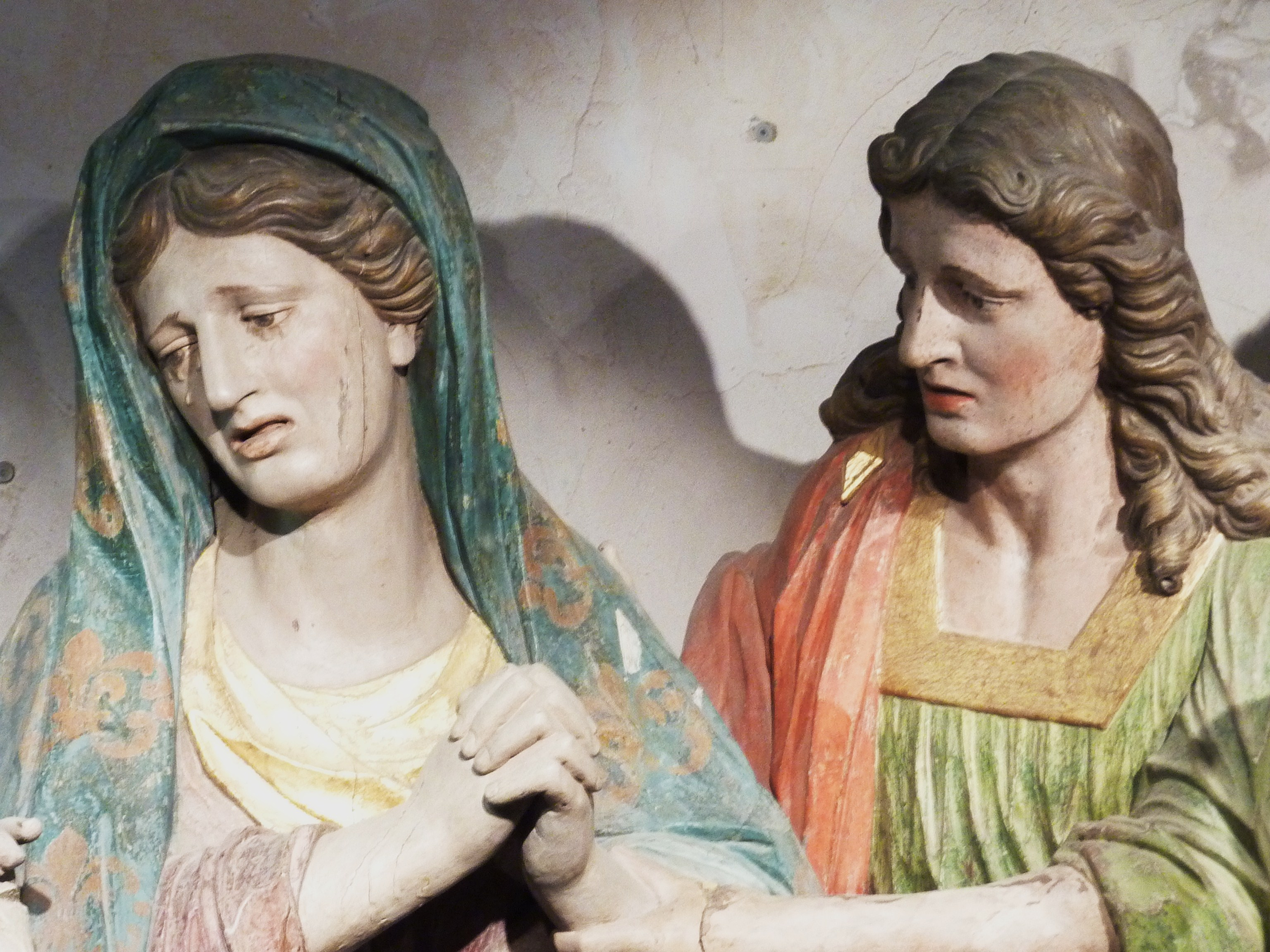
John the Evangelist comforts the distraught Virgin Mary

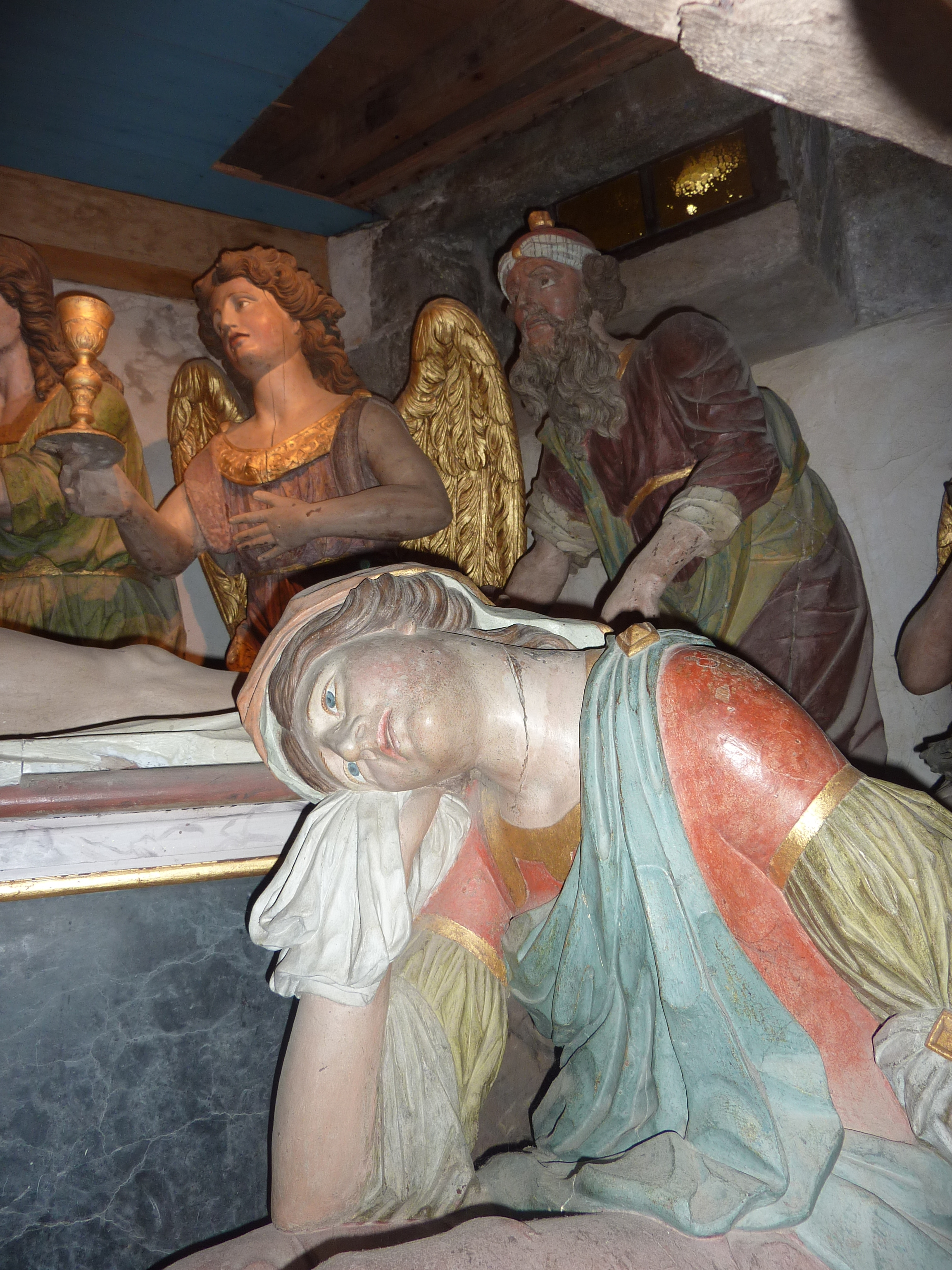
Mary Magdalene in tears

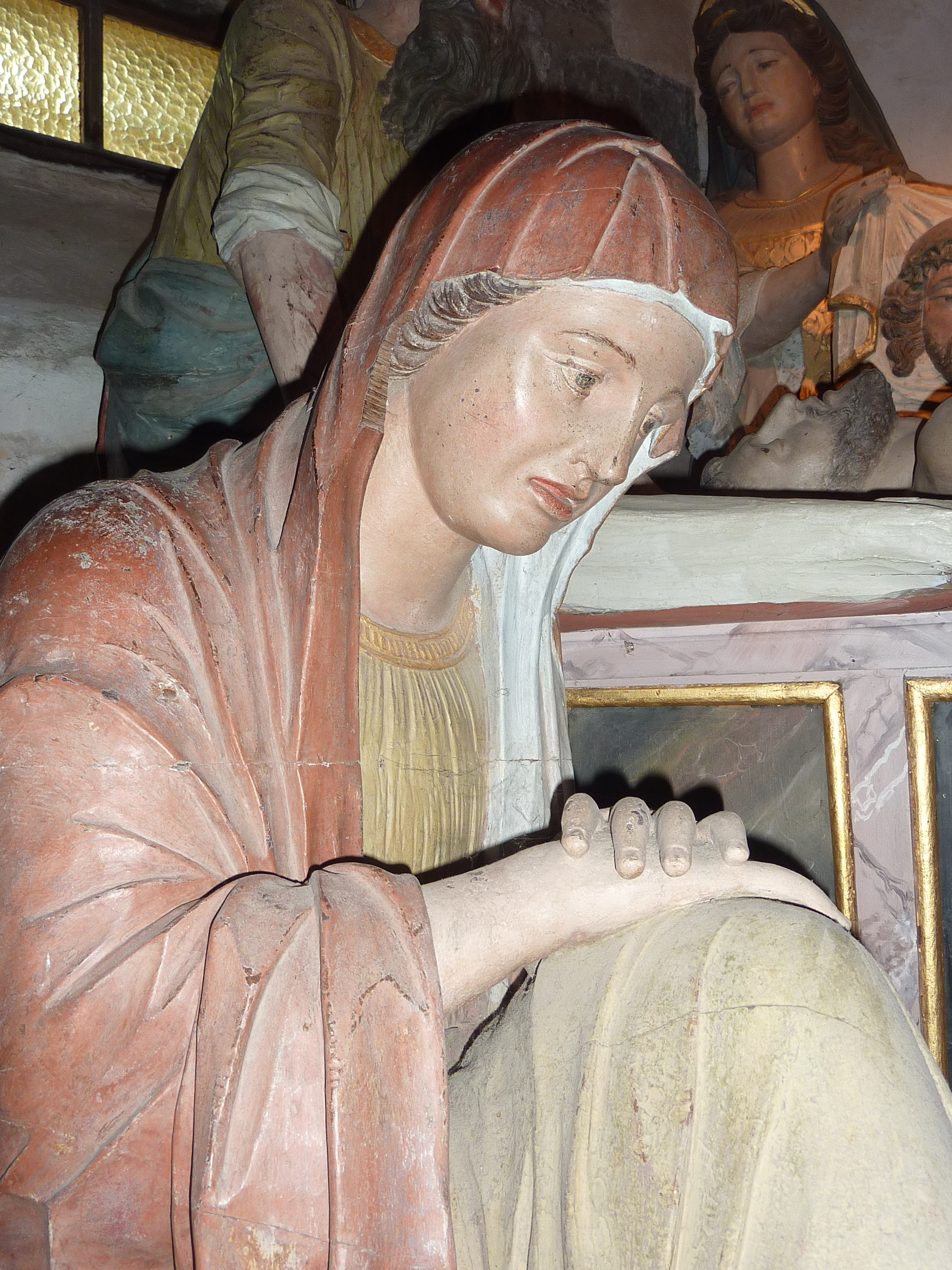
Mary Salome

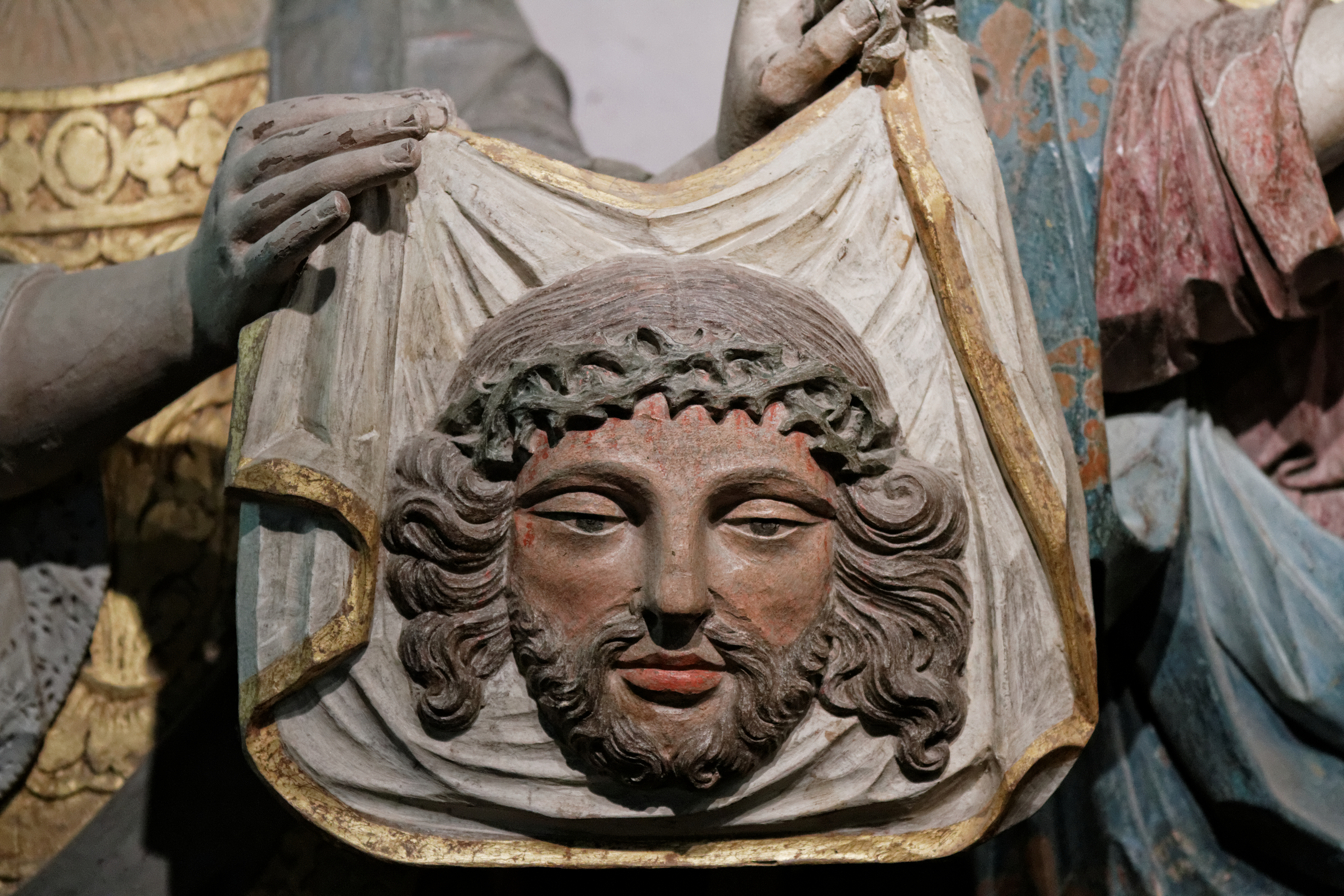
Saint Veronica's veil

Inside the ossuary is a wooden vault ("Voûte en bois") decorated with carvings of angels holding the instruments of the passion and an altarpiece dating to 1685 and dedicated to Saint Joseph.

== The choir and main altar ==
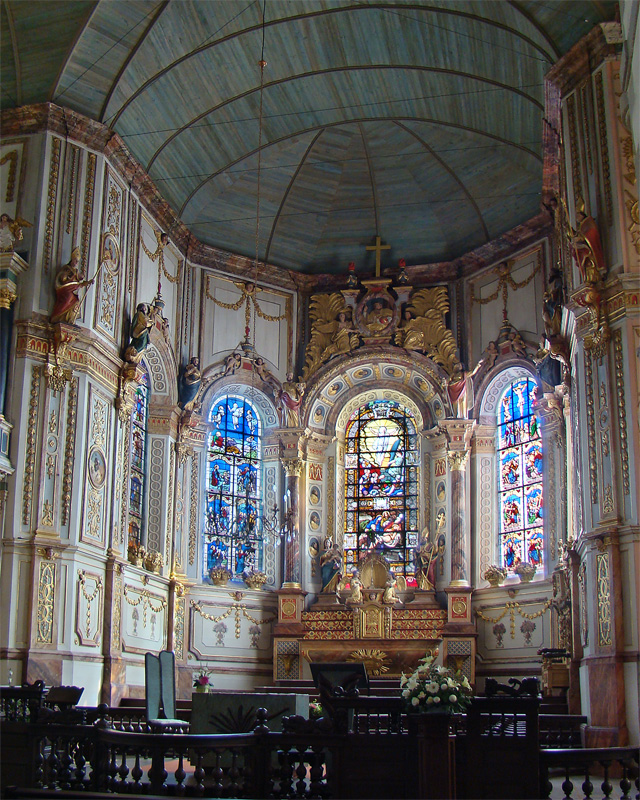
View of Main altar and choir area and some of Notre-Dames' windows

The main altar of the Notre-Dame church has a tabernacle and is surmounted by statues of both the Virgin Mary and Saint Thégonnec. There is no altarpiece as this would have covered the windows but lavish wood-carvings surround the three windows and decorate the north and south sections of the choir area. Olivier Lespaignol of Morlaix is credited with having carved the works on the evangelist side of the altar, working on designs by Jean Hergouarc'h and the work on the epistle side is credited to Guillaume Guérin from Brélévénez and subsequently Yves Le Goff from Brest working on the designs of Robelin. This work was completed between 1724 and 1732.

== The legend of Saint Thégonnec ==
According to legend, Saint Thégonnec, who originally came from Wales and was a disciple of Saint Pol Aurélien, had tamed a stag and used it to pull his cart which carried stones to build the church he was constructing. One day a wolf attacked and ate the stag but Saint Thégonnec preached to the wolf and persuaded it to replace the stag and pull the cart. Depictions of Saint Thégonnec therefore usually portray him accompanied by a stag or a wolf.

== Wood carvings in the choir ==
These were executed in two stages. In the years 1724 to 1725 the carvings on the evangelist side of the choir were executed by Olivier Lespaignol of Morlaix based on the drawings of the architect Boismaurin and between 1730 and 1732 the carvings on the epistle side were firstly the work of Guillaume Guérin who was based in Brélévenez and then by Hervé Le Goff of Brest based on the designs of Robelin.

== The 1998 fire ==
On 8 June 1998 the church suffered a bad although accidental fire which devastated the north wing and despite the efforts of the local fire brigade and local people the north aisle of the church was destroyed including the altarpiece "Notre-Dame de Vray Secours" and the nave with the rood screen. A public appeal sought to raise funds to repair the damage and over 700 donations were recorded. Extensive restoration followed, completed in 2005. The lost altarpiece was completely and exactly replicated.

== The organ ==
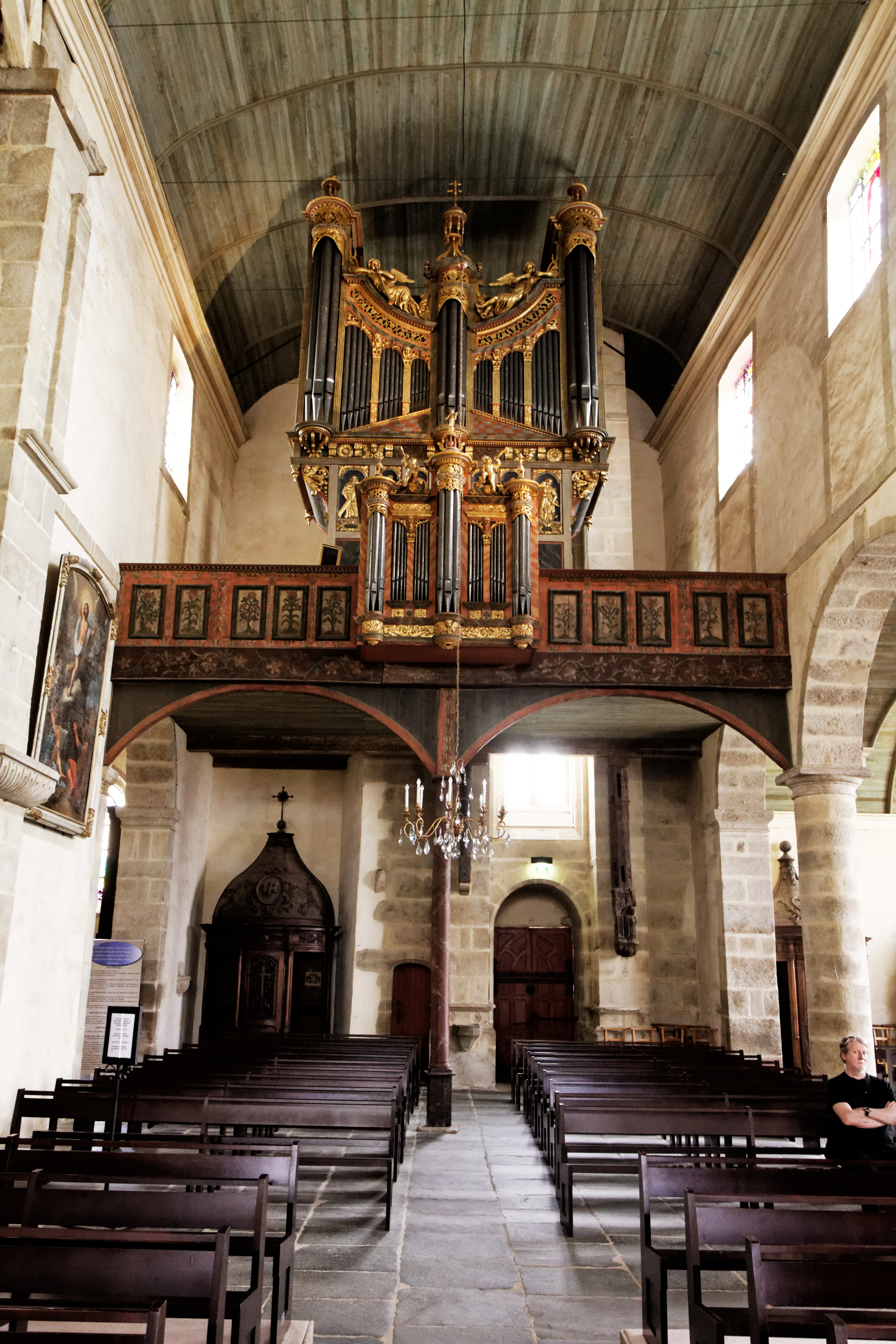
The organ at Notre-Dame

This dates from 1670 to 1676 and was made by Jacques Mascard who was a follower of Robert Dallam.

== The sacristy and the baptismal fonts ==
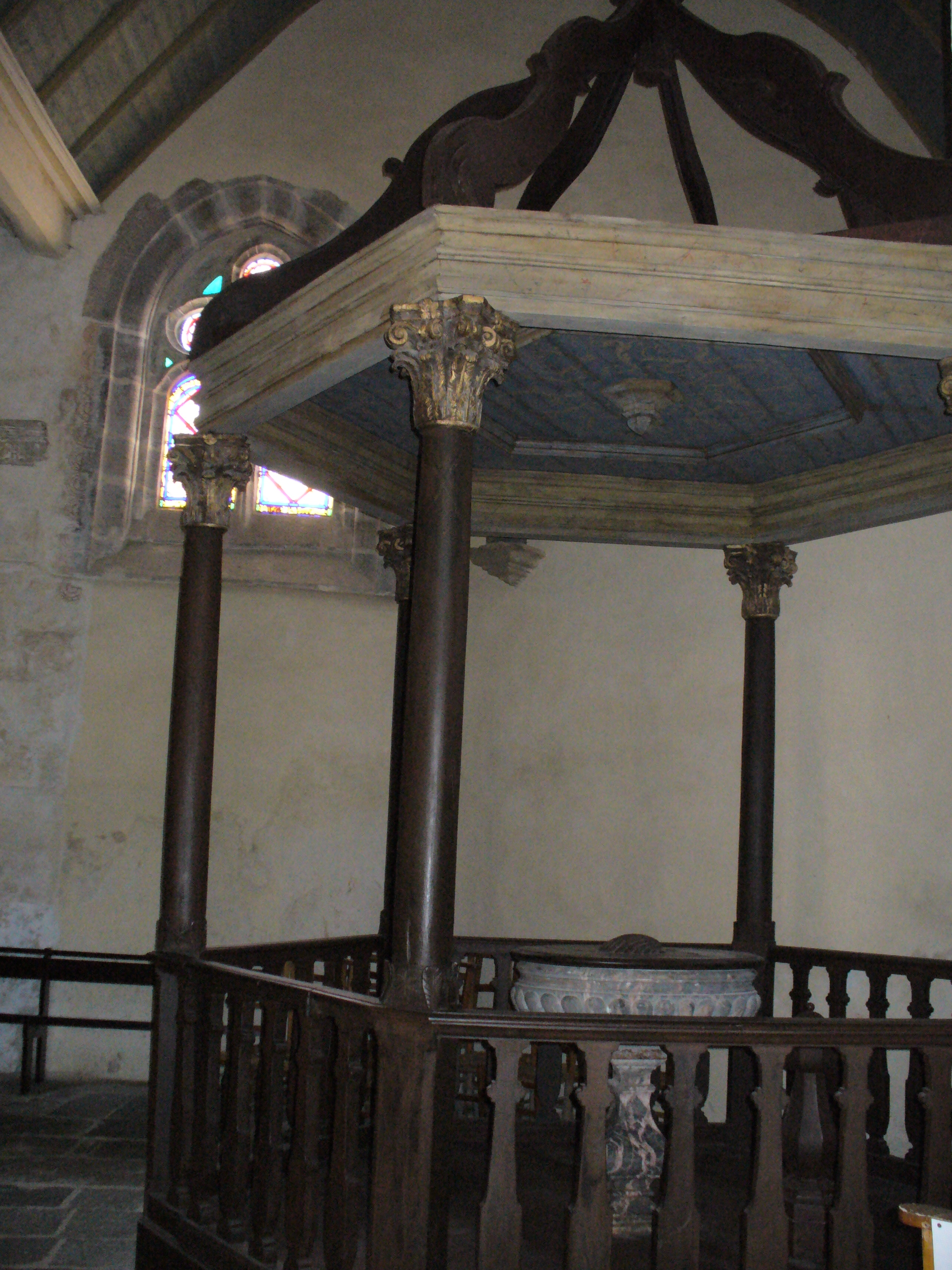
The baptismal fonts at Notre-Dame

The sacristy was constructed in 1686 by a team of workers led by Guillaume Le Tauc. The master carpenter was a Paul Le Goff. The baptismal fonts are located by the "chapelle des Trépassés".

== Stained glass ==
The windows in the Notre=Dame church are by Jean-Louis Nicolas of Morlaix and date from 1862 to 1868.

== Statuary ==
The church is rich in statuary. This includes:-

1. A "poutre de gloire" or rood depicting Christ on the cross, the Virgin Mary and John the Evangelist. This was badly damaged in the fire but has been replaced. What was rescued from the fire of the original "poutre de gloire" is also displayed on the church walls.

2. In the south aisle statues of Saint Christopher, Saint Roch and Saint Sebastian.

3. A statue depicting the Virgin Mary with her mother. Some photographs are shown below.

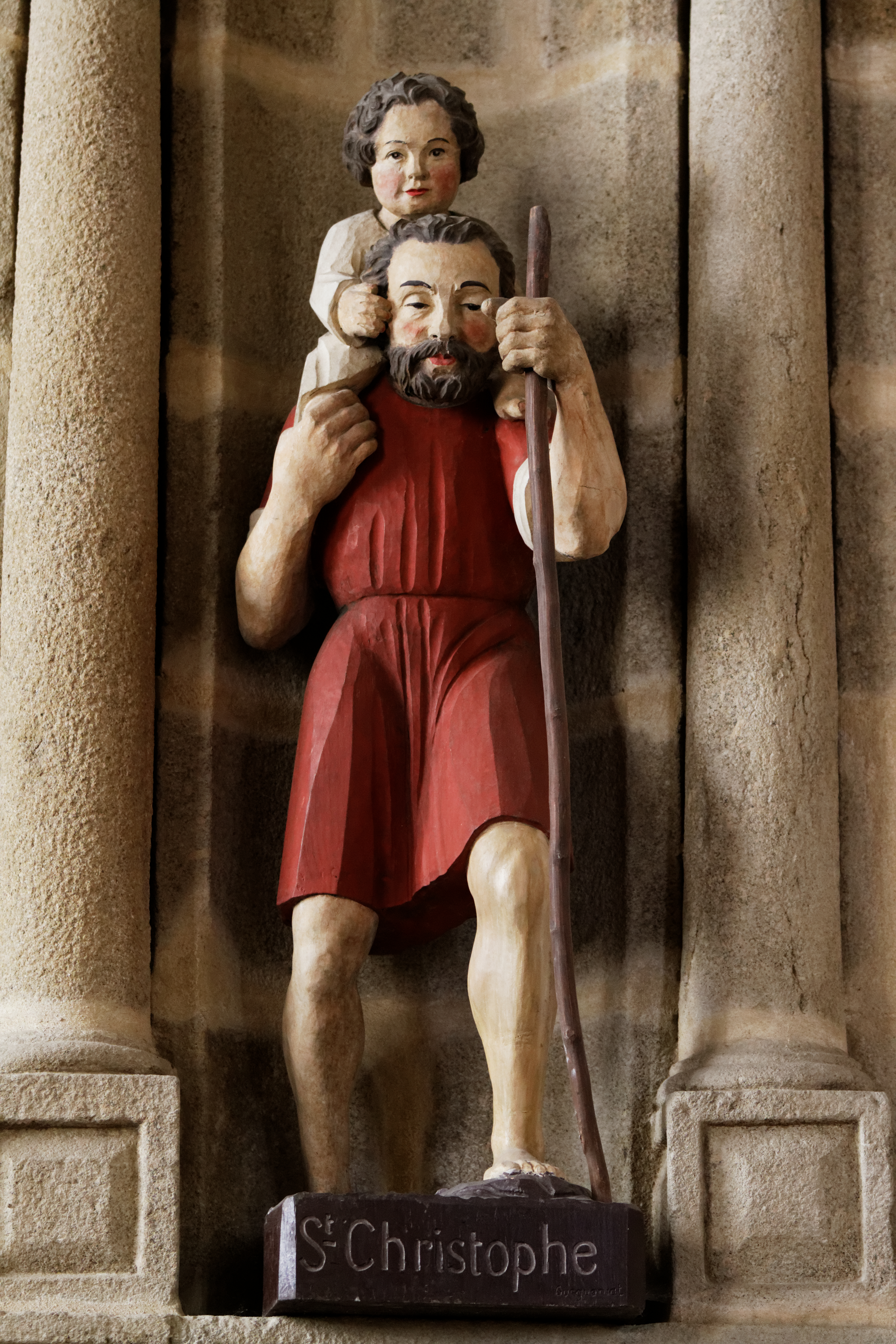
Statue of Saint Christopher

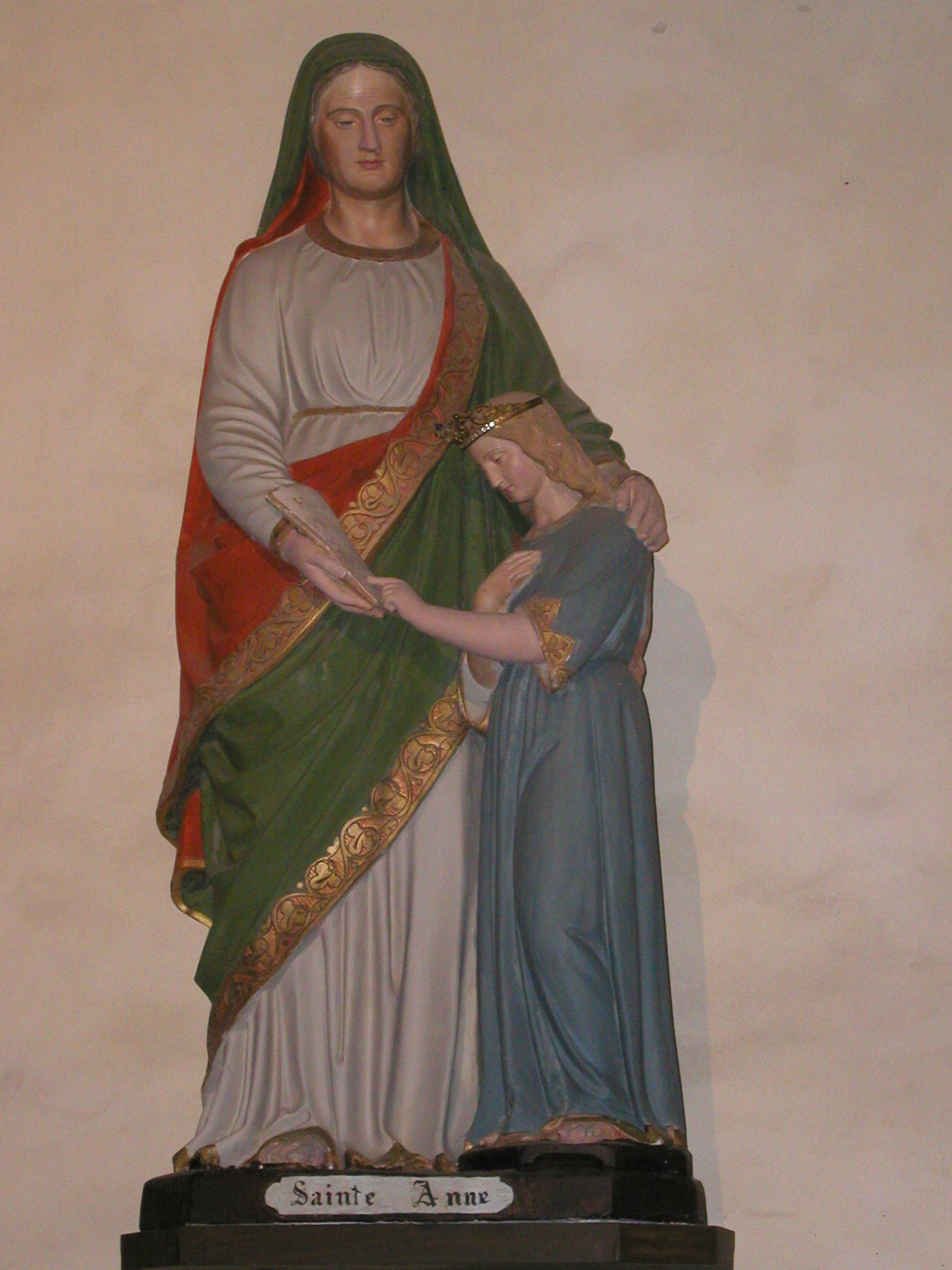
Sainte Anne with the Virgin Mary

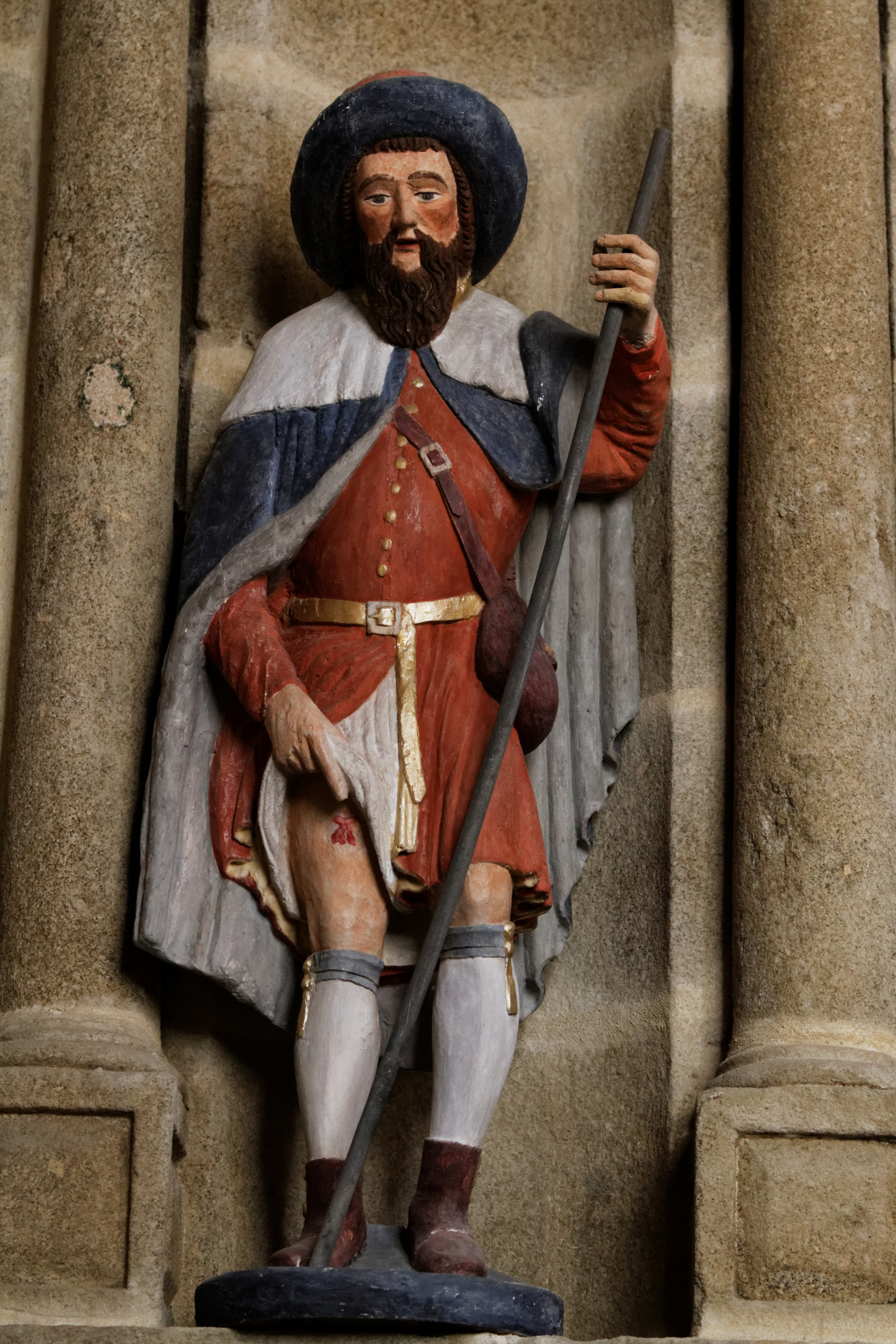
Saint Roch

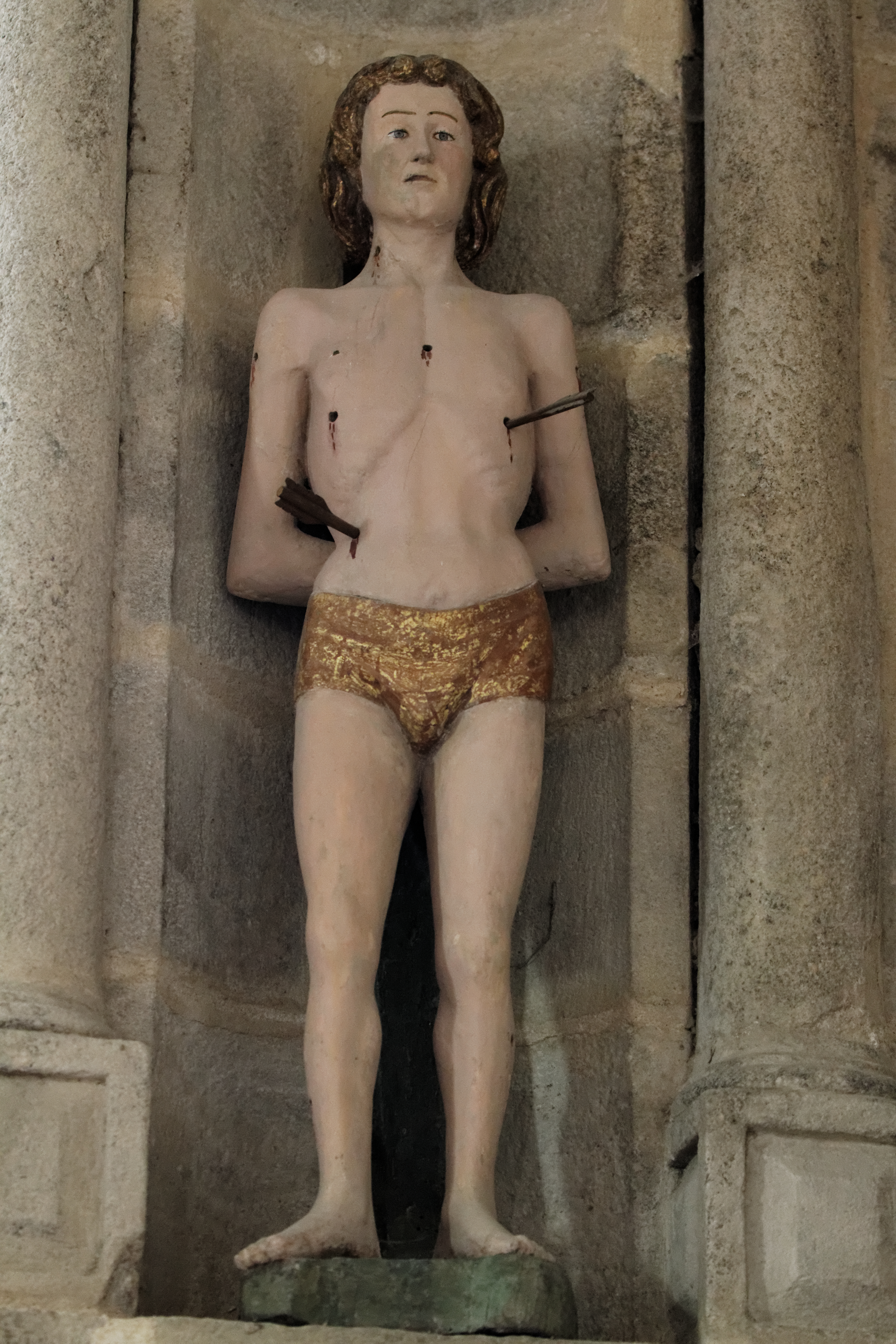
Saint Sebastian

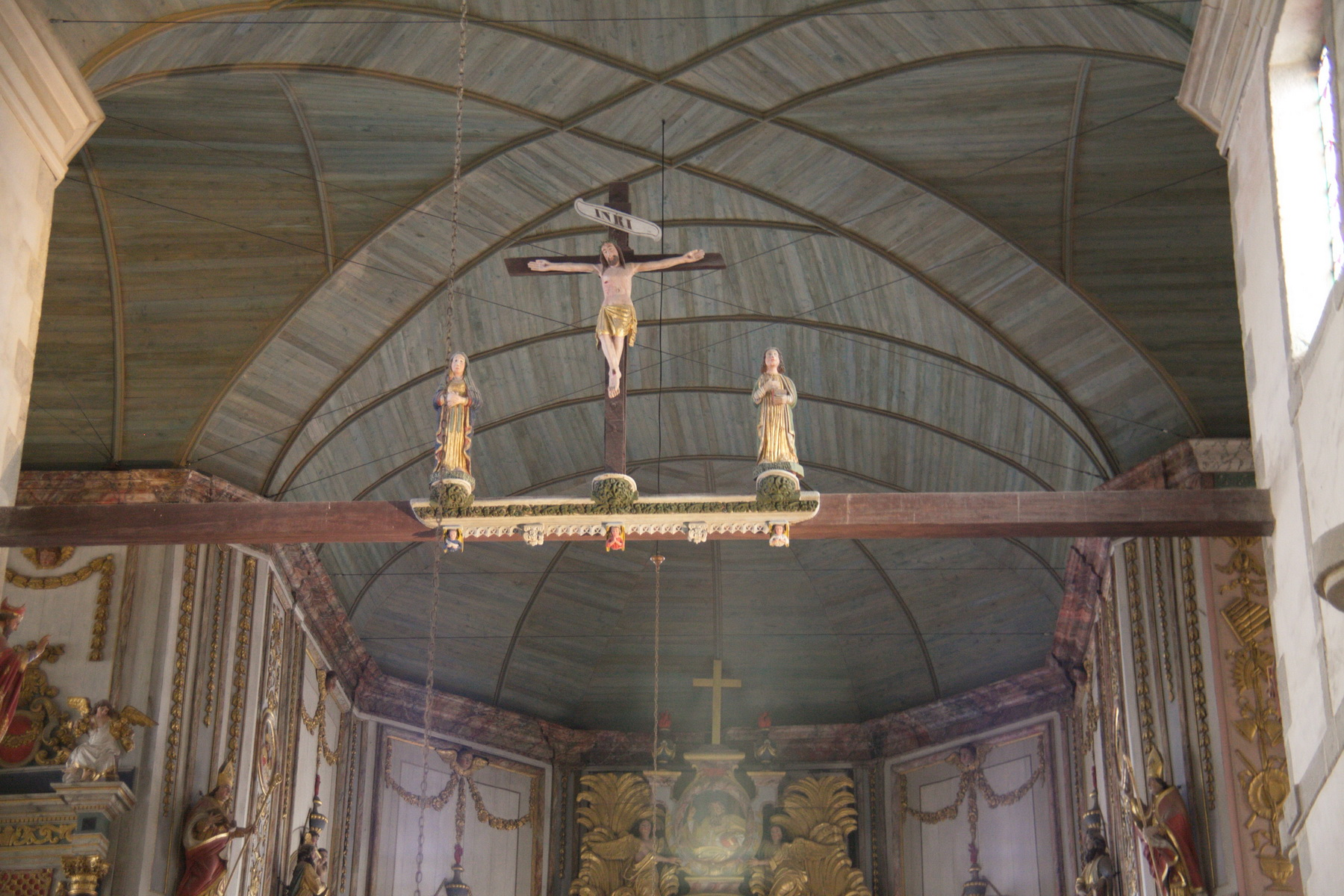
The rood or "poutre de gloire"

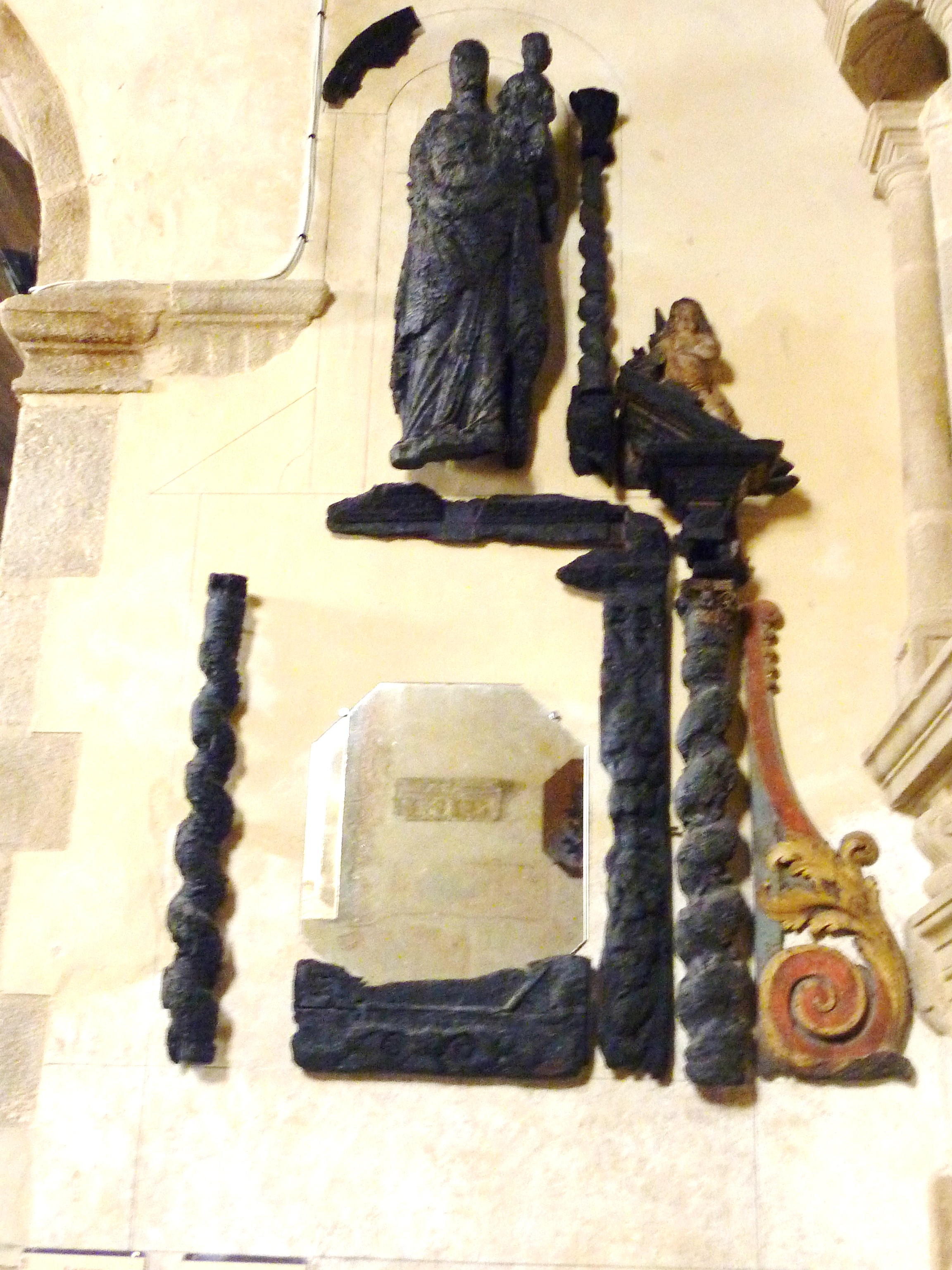
The remains of the original "poutre de gloire" rescued from the fire

== Recommended read ==
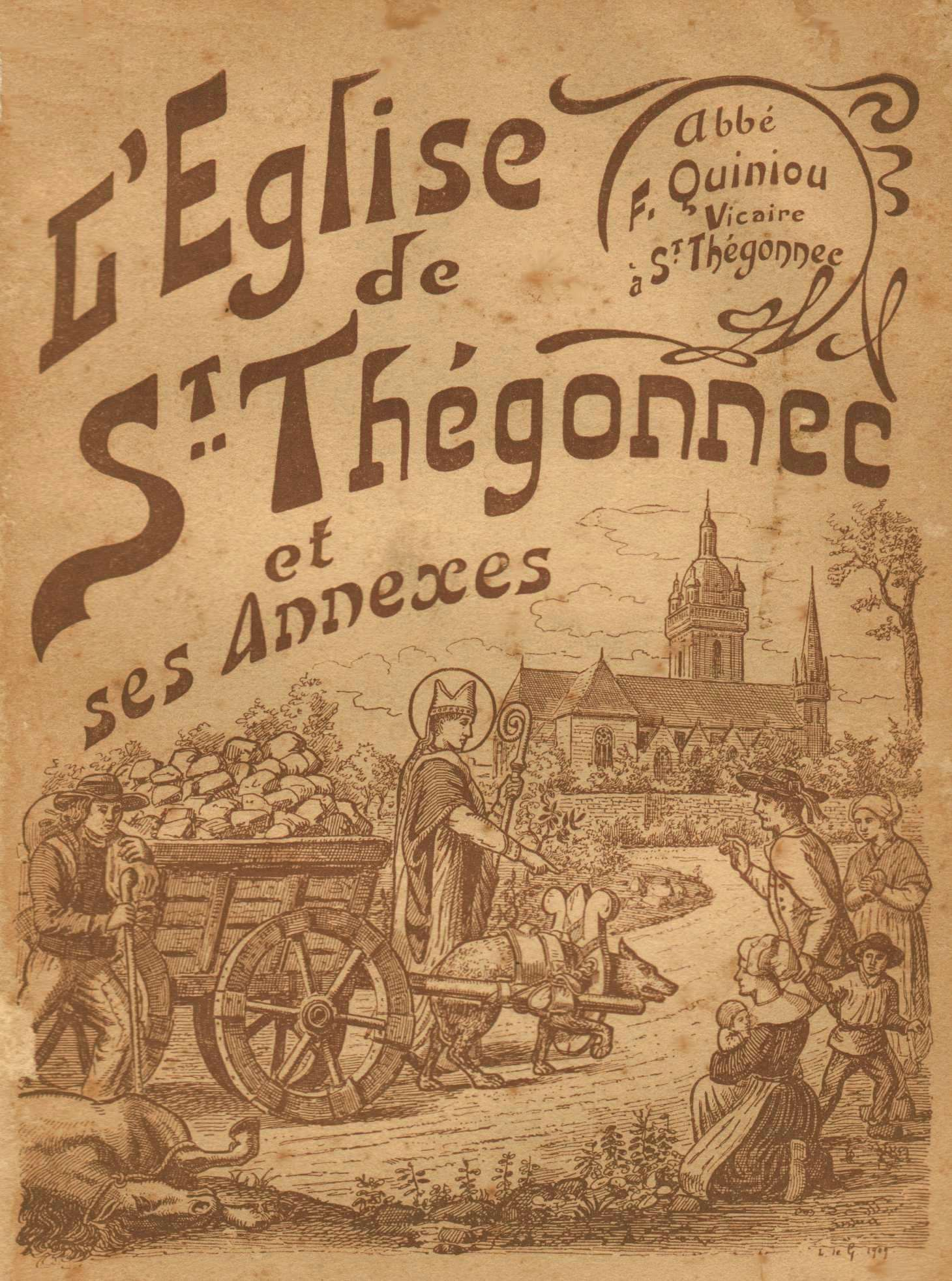
The cover of the book "Saint-Thégonnec. L'Église et ses annexes"

The Église de Saint-Thégonnec, given the classification of a "monument historiques" by the "Commission des Beaux-Arts" in 1886, has undergone many changes since its original construction and now has three naves with seven columns and ten arcades. In the 18th-century, two doorways were created at the base of the bell-tower to allow processions easy access to the church but this change was subsequently reversed at the insistence of the "Commission des Beaux-Arts". Further details of modifications made to the church and other details are given in the excellent book "SAINT-THÉGONNEC-L’église et ses annexes" by the Abbé F. QUINIOU, a vicar of Saint-Thégonnec written in 1909 and published by F.Paillart. The cover of this book is shown on the right.

== Other calvaries and crosses ==
In the Saint-Thégonnec commune area there are reckoned to be 32 crosses and 45 calvaries. Amongst the best known are those at Luzec dating to 1864, the Croas-Calafres or Bodériny dating to 1632 and that at Broustou which dates to 1662.

== The Sainte-Brigitte chapel ==
There is also a small chapel in Saint-this dedicated to sainte Brigitte, not to the Irish Brigitte, the abbess of Kildare, as is normally the case in Brittany, but Brigitte de Suède who lived from 1303 to 1373. The chapel was built in the 16th century and building continued until 1865. The chapel contains several polychromed statues including Sainte-Brigitte and two versions of the Virgin Mary with child, one showing her seated and the other showing her standing. The pardon is celebrated twice a year on the third Sunday of July and the third Sunday of August.

== See also ==
- List of the works of the Maître de Thégonnec
- Chapelle de Lothéa
