= Segal (disambiguation) =

Segal, and its variants including Segel or Siegel, is a primarily an Ashkenazi Jewish family name.

It may also refer to:

- Segal Group, a consulting firm in the USA and Canada
- Segal, Kentucky, an unincorporated community in Edmonson County
- Segal Lock and Hardware Company, a hardware manufacturer of Manhattan, USA
- Saint-Ségal, a commune in the Finistère department of Brittany in north-western France
- SEGAL, Société Européenne de Galvanisation, steel products company, part of Tata Steel Europe

== See also ==
- Sigel (disambiguation)
- Sehgal also Sahgal or Segal, an Indian surname
