= Siegel =

Siegel (also Segal, Segali or Segel), is a German and Ashkenazi Jewish surname. Alternate spellings include Sigel, Sigl, Siegl, and others.

It can be traced to 11th century Bavaria and was used by people who made wax seals for or sealed official documents (each such male being described as a Siegelbeamter). "Siegel" is also the modern German word for seal. The name ultimately derives from the Latin sigillum, meaning "seal". The Germanicized derivative of the name was given to professional seal makers and engravers.

== Variants, and false cognates ==
Other variants may routinely include Siegelman, Siegle, Sigl, and Sigel. Presumably, some bearers of these names are lineal descendants of ethnic Jews who changed the spellings of their surnames in the course of assimilating among other cultures: "Segal" and "Segel" are false cognates to Siegel, usually having derived from Latin America, where the double vowel did not translate into pronunciation.

Most sources indicate that it derives from the Hebrew acronym סגל the abbreviated form of either Sagan Gadol ha-Leviya, which means "great assistant to the Levites", or Sagan Gadol L'-Cohen which means "great assistant to the Cohanim" (special group of Levites who tended to more holy tasks within the Jewish Temple), and was an honorific title bestowed upon a member of the tribe of Levi who performed temple duties faithfully. (Some Rabbis aver that Segal/Segall derives from the Hebrew s'gula, meaning "treasure." However, this would not explain the association of the name only with the tribe of Levi.) Further, the double-L in Segall seems to be a specifically Romanian spelling variant.

== Siegel ==
- Adam Siegel (born 1969), American guitarist
- Bernard Siegel (1868–1940), American character actor
- Bernard Siegel, American attorney
- Bernie S. Siegel (born 1932), American writer and surgeon
- Bugsy Siegel (1906–1947), American mobster
- Carl Ludwig Siegel (1896–1981), German mathematician
- Corky Siegel (born 1943), American harmonica player in the Siegel–Schwall Band
- David Siegel (disambiguation), several people
- Don Siegel (1912-1991), American film and television director and producer
- Dora Siegel (1912-2003), birth name of Dora Gad, Israeli interior designer
- Eli Siegel (1902–1978), Latvian-American poet and critic who founded philosophy of aesthetic realism
- George L. Siegel (1885-1963), American lawyer and politician
- James Siegel (born 1954), American thriller novelist
- Jeremy Siegel (born 1945), American academic, author and commentator
- Jerry Siegel (1914–1996), American comic book writer, one of the creators of Superman
- Joel Siegel (1943–2007), American film critic and television journalist
- Karola Siegel, birthname of Ruth Westheimer (born 1928; known as "Dr. Ruth"), German-American sex therapist, talk show host, author, professor, Holocaust survivor, and Haganah sniper.
- Kate Siegel (born 1982), American actress and screenwriter
- Larry Siegel (1925-2019), American comedy writer
- Mark Siegel (born 1967), American graphic novel author and publisher
- Max Siegel, American business executive
- Mona L. Siegel, American scholar, author, and historian
- Nolan Siegel, (born 2004), American racing driver
- Ralph Siegel (born 1945), German record producer and songwriter
- Ralph Siegel (scientist) (1958–2011), American neuroscientist
- Rick Siegel, American comedian, talent agent and inventor
- Robert Siegel, American radio journalist, host of NPR's All Things Considered
- Shepard Siegel, Canadian psychologist
- Sol C. Siegel (1903–1982), American reporter and film producer
- Stephen Siegel (born 1944), American real estate executive
- Steven Siegel (born 1953), American sculptor
- Warren Siegel, American physicist
- Wayne Siegel (born 1953), American composer living in Denmark
- William Siegel (1905–1990), American graphic artist

== Seigel ==
- Andrea Seigel (born 1979), American novelist and screenwriter
- Jerrold Seigel, American historian
- Kalman Seigel (1917–1998), American journalist

== Siegal ==
- Ian Siegal (born 1971), British blues singer and guitarist
- Justine Siegal (born 1975), American baseball coach and sports educator
- Peggy Siegal (born 1947), American publicist

== Seigal ==
- Anna Seigal, British mathematician
- Bernard Seigal (1957–2006), American musician

== Sigl ==
- Georg Sigl (1811–1887), Austrian mechanical engineer and entrepreneur
- Robert Sigl (born 1962), German filmmaker
- Rudi Sigl (born 1937), German sport shooter
- Wolfgang Sigl (born 1972), Austrian rower

== Mathematical concepts ==
- Brauer–Siegel theorem
- Gelfand–Naimark–Segal construction
- Siegel modular form
- Segal space
- Newell–Whitehead–Segel equation
- Siegel zero

== See also ==
- Chagall (disambiguation)
- Segal
- Segel
- Sigel (disambiguation)
- Siegelbaum
