= Segel =

Segel, and its variants including Segal or Siegel, is a primarily an Ashkenazi Jewish family name.

Notable people with the surname include:

- Arthur I. Segel, American economist
- Binjamin W. Segel (1867–1931), author
- Harold Segel (1930–2016), American professor
- Jason Segel (born 1980), American actor
- Jonathan Segel (born 1963), American composer
- Joseph Segel (1931–2019), American businessman
- Lee Segel (1932–2005), American applied mathematician

== See also ==
- Chagall (disambiguation)
- Segal
- Siegel
- Sigel (disambiguation)
