= Sigel Township =

Sigel Township may refer to the following places:

- Sigel Township, Shelby County, Illinois
- Sigel Township, Huron County, Michigan
- Sigel Township, Brown County, Minnesota

See also

- Sigel (disambiguation)
