= Toros y toreros =

Book of drawings by Pablo Picasso

Toros Y Toreros
- Authors: Pablo Picasso, Luis Miguel Dominguin, Georges Boudaille
- Translator: Georges Franck
- Publisher: The Circle of Art, Thames and Hudson
- Publication date: 1961

Toros Y Toreros is a 1961 book of bullfighting drawings by Pablo Picasso with text by bullfighter Luis Miguel Dominguin (translated from Spanish by Georges Franck) and an essay by Georges Boudaille. The title of the book is handwritten by Picasso.

Picasso created the cover page and illustrations using a series of three sketchbooks. The technique utilized a quasi systematic use of brush ink wash, reproducing the book on Arches paper. The drawings were printed in Mourlots Studio, the famous lithographic print house that worked with Picasso, among other artists such as Matisse and Chagal in Paris, France. The text was printed and book bound in the Netherlands for distribution within Europe.

== Background ==
The book begins with an anecdote recounted by Luis Miguel Dominguin:

Pablo phoned me from Cannes. Some time ago he wanted me, he told me, to write something for one of his books that was about to be published. I asked him if it was a prologue or a comment, whether to speak of painting or polar star. He told me that any of these themes would do the trick.

Picasso and Dominguin met in 1950, introduced to each other by Jean Cocteau.

== Description ==
The book consists of 32 pages of text followed by Picasso's illustrations which reproduce three sketchbooks from 1959. The plates are black & white, sepia and color, and many are single-sided. Part of the sketchbooks have never been found (the drawings of March 2 and 3, notably representing Jacqueline on horseback). Among the most astonishing images, there is one with Christ on the cross saving a picador from death.

These drawings by Picasso covered a period from 1950 to 1960, during which time he enjoyed seeing Dominguin bullfight in the arenas of Nîmes, Arles, Frejus and Vallauris.

The leading copies of this publication contain a series of reproductions of color drawings selected from the first two notebooks, as well as a lithograph of February 7, 1961.

The works deal with all stages of bullfighting and Georges Boudaille highlights Picasso's persevering loyalty to portraying the theme of bullfighting since 1890
