= Segal =

Segal, and its variants including Sagal, Segel, Sigal or Siegel, is a family name which is primarily Ashkenazi Jewish.

The name is said to be derived from Hebrew segan leviyyah (assistant to the Levites) although a minority of sources claim that "Segal" is instead a Hebrew abbreviation for segan le-kehunah (assistant to the Cohen – assistant to the priest).

Notable people with the surname include:

- Abe Segal (1930–2016), South African tennis player
- Alan F. Segal (1945–2011), American Professor of Jewish Studies
- Allan Segal (1941–2012), British documentary filmmaker
- Alvin Segal (1933–2022), American-Canadian businessman and philanthropist
- Amit Segal (born 1982), Israeli journalist
- Anna Segal (born 1986), Australian Olympic freestyle skier and 2-time world champion
- Anthony Segal (born 1944), British physician/scientist
- Brandon Segal (born 1983), Canadian ice hockey player
- Charles Segal (classicist) (1936–2002), American historian and classicist
- D. Segal, pen name of Isaac Bashevis Singer
- Dan Segal (born 1947), British mathematician
- David Segal (politician), Member of the Rhode Island House of Representatives and candidate for Rhode Island's 1st congressional district
- David HaLevi Segal (1586–1667), Polish rabbi and Halakhist
- Erich Segal (1937–2010), American author, screenwriter, and educator
- Ester H. Segal, Israeli nanotechnologist and educator
- Francesca Segal (born 1980), British author and journalist
- Gabriel Segal (philosopher) (born 1959), British professor, philosopher and author
- George Segal (artist) (1924–2000), American sculptor and painter
- George Segal (1934–2021), American actor
- German Segal (born 1995), Russian actor
- Gloria Segal (1928–1993), American politician
- Graeme Segal (born 1941), Australian mathematician
- Hugh Segal (1950–2023), Canadian Senator and co-chair of the Conservative Party of Canada campaign in the 2006 Federal Election
- Irving Segal (1918–1998), American mathematician
- Jack Segal (1918–2005), American composer
- Jakob Segal (1911–1995), biology professor at the Humboldt University of Berlin
- Jason Segal (born 1980), American actor
- Jeffrey Segal (1920–2015), British actor
- Jérôme Segal (born 1970), French-Austrian essayist, historian, and journalist
- Joe Segal (1925–2022), Canadian businessman and philanthropist
- Joel Segal, American sports agent
- Jonathan Segal (actor), (1953–1999), American television actor
- Judah Segal (1912–2003), British professor of Semitics
- Kate Segal (born 1975), Member of the Michigan House of Representatives from the 62nd district
- Lore Segal (1928–2024), Austrian-American novelist and Pulitzer Prize finalist
- Marilyn Segal, American psychologist
- Michael Segal (born 1972), Israeli scholar of computer science
- Mike Segal, (1922–1982) American politician
- Moshe Zvi Segal (1875–1968), Israeli rabbi
- Nachum Segal, Jewish American DJ
- Nancy L. Segal (born 1951), American evolutionary psychologist and behavioral geneticist
- Ned Segal (born c. 1974), American business executive
- Peter Segal (born 1962), American film director
- Philip Segal (born 1958), English-born television producer
- Richard D. Segal, American businessman and art collector
- Ronald Segal (1932–2008), South African writer and activist
- Samuel Segal (1902–1985), British doctor and politician
- Sandra Segal Ikuta, United States circuit judge
- Sara Segal, later Sophia Karp (1861–1904), the first professional Yiddish theatre actress
- Sharmin Segal (born 1995), Indian actress in Hindi films
- Stephen H. Segal, American science fiction writer and editor
- Steve Segal, American animator
- Steven Seagal (born 1952), American actor, producer, screenwriter, martial artist, and musician
- Sydney Segal, American female contestant on reality show Survivor 41#
- Tobias Segal, American actor
- Walter Segal (1907–1985), German-born Romanian architect working in England, who developed a system of self-build housing
- Yehiel Segal, (1924 –1996), Israeli painter
- Yuval Segal (born 1971), Israeli actor and comedian
- Zindel Segal (born 1956), Ukrainian-Canadian cognitive psychologist, one of the founders of mindfulness-based cognitive therapy

== See also ==
- Chagall (disambiguation)
- Siegel
- Segel
- Sigel (disambiguation)
