= Saint-Thégonnec =

Commune in Finistère, France

Saint-Thégonnec Sant-Tegoneg
- Part of Saint-Thégonnec Loc-Eguiner
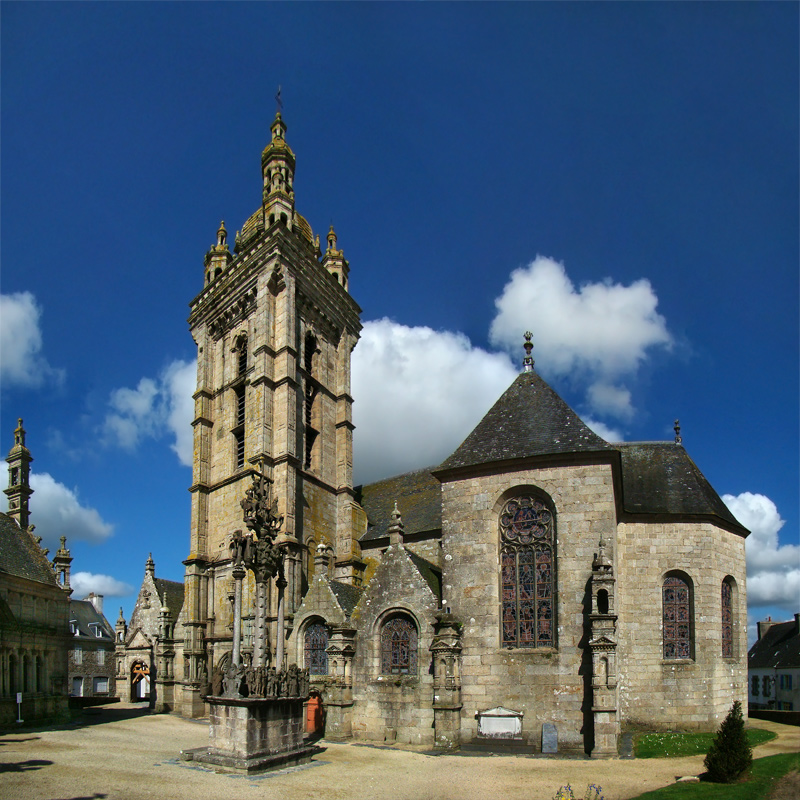
- Notre-Dame Church in parish close

- Coat of arms
- Location of Saint-Thégonnec
- Location within France Location within Brittany
- Coordinates: 48°31′19″N 3°56′43″W
- Country: France
- Region: Brittany
- Department: Finistère
- Arrondissement: Morlaix
- Canton: Morlaix
- Commune: Saint-Thégonnec Loc-Eguiner
- Area^{1}: 41.76 km^{2} (16.12 sq mi)
- Highest elevation: 216 m (709 ft)
- Lowest elevation: 7 m (23 ft)
- Population (2022): 2,792
  - Density: 66.86/km^{2} (173.2/sq mi)
- Time zone: UTC+01:00 (CET)
  - Summer (DST): UTC+02:00 (CEST)
- Postal code: 29410
- ^{1} French Land Register data, which excludes lakes, ponds, glaciers > 1 km^{2} (0.386 sq mi or 247 acres) and river estuaries.

Saint-Thégonnec (French pronunciation: [sɛ̃ teɡɔnɛk]; Breton: Sant-Tegoneg) is a former commune in the Finistère department in Brittany in northwestern France. On 1 January 2016, it was merged into the new commune Saint-Thégonnec Loc-Eguiner.

The village is noted for its very elaborate parish close, one of a number in the area, which include Guimiliau and Lampaul-Guimiliau. The commune is listed as a Village étape.

== Population ==
Inhabitants of Saint-Thégonnec are called Saint-Thégonnecois in French.

Historical population

Year	Pop.	±% p.a.
1793	3,291	—
1800	3,291	+0.00%
1806	3,422	+0.65%
1821	3,563	+0.27%
1831	3,648	+0.24%
1836	3,836	+1.01%
1841	3,926	+0.46%
1846	3,962	+0.18%
1851	3,802	−0.82%
1856	3,588	−1.15%
1861	3,957	+1.98%
1866	4,050	+0.47%
1872	3,681	−1.58%
1876	3,548	−0.92%
1881	3,409	−0.80%
1886	3,215	−1.16%
1891	3,317	+0.63%

Year	Pop.	±% p.a.
1896	3,073	−1.52%
1901	3,144	+0.46%
1906	3,206	+0.39%
1911	3,171	−0.22%
1921	2,980	−0.62%
1926	2,977	−0.02%
1931	2,719	−1.80%
1936	2,536	−1.38%
1946	2,532	−0.02%
1954	2,241	−1.51%
1962	2,159	−0.46%
1968	2,127	−0.25%
1975	1,986	−0.98%
1982	2,133	+1.03%
1990	2,139	+0.04%
1999	2,267	+0.65%
2022	2,792	+0.91%

Source: EHESS and INSEE

== Breton language ==
The municipality launched a linguistic plan through Ya d'ar brezhoneg on 25 March 2005.

== Parish close ==
A parish close is an enclosed area around the parish church, including the church yard and a number of other features.

In common with others in the area, the Saint-Thégonnec close features a large ceremonial entrance arch, stressing the importance of the close as a focus for pilgrimage and pardons. An impressive calvary or crucifix forms the focus of the church yard. As at nearby Lampaul-Guimiliau, there is a separate charnel house or ossuary, with a life-sized tableau of the Entombment of Christ.

The interior of the church is exemplary of the local version of Baroque style, with a large quantity of polychrome sculpture and decoration, including a spectacular pulpit.

See Saint-Thégonnec Parish close

== See also ==
- Communes of the Finistère department
- Parc naturel régional d'Armorique
- Yann Larhantec Sculptor of Calvaries including one in Saint-Thégonnec
- List of the works of the Maître de Plougastel
- List of the works of the Maître de Thégonnec
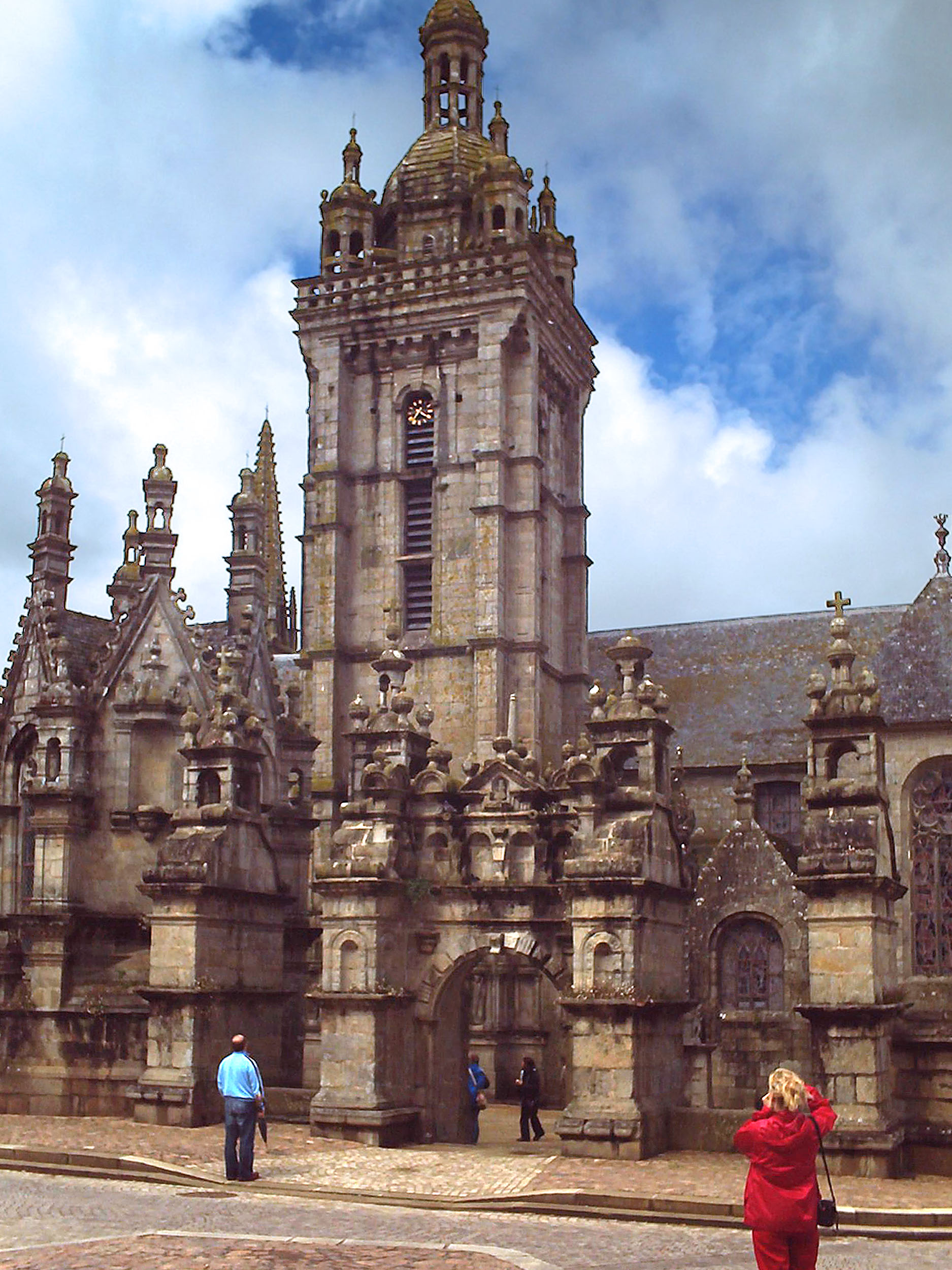
The church and entrance to parish close.

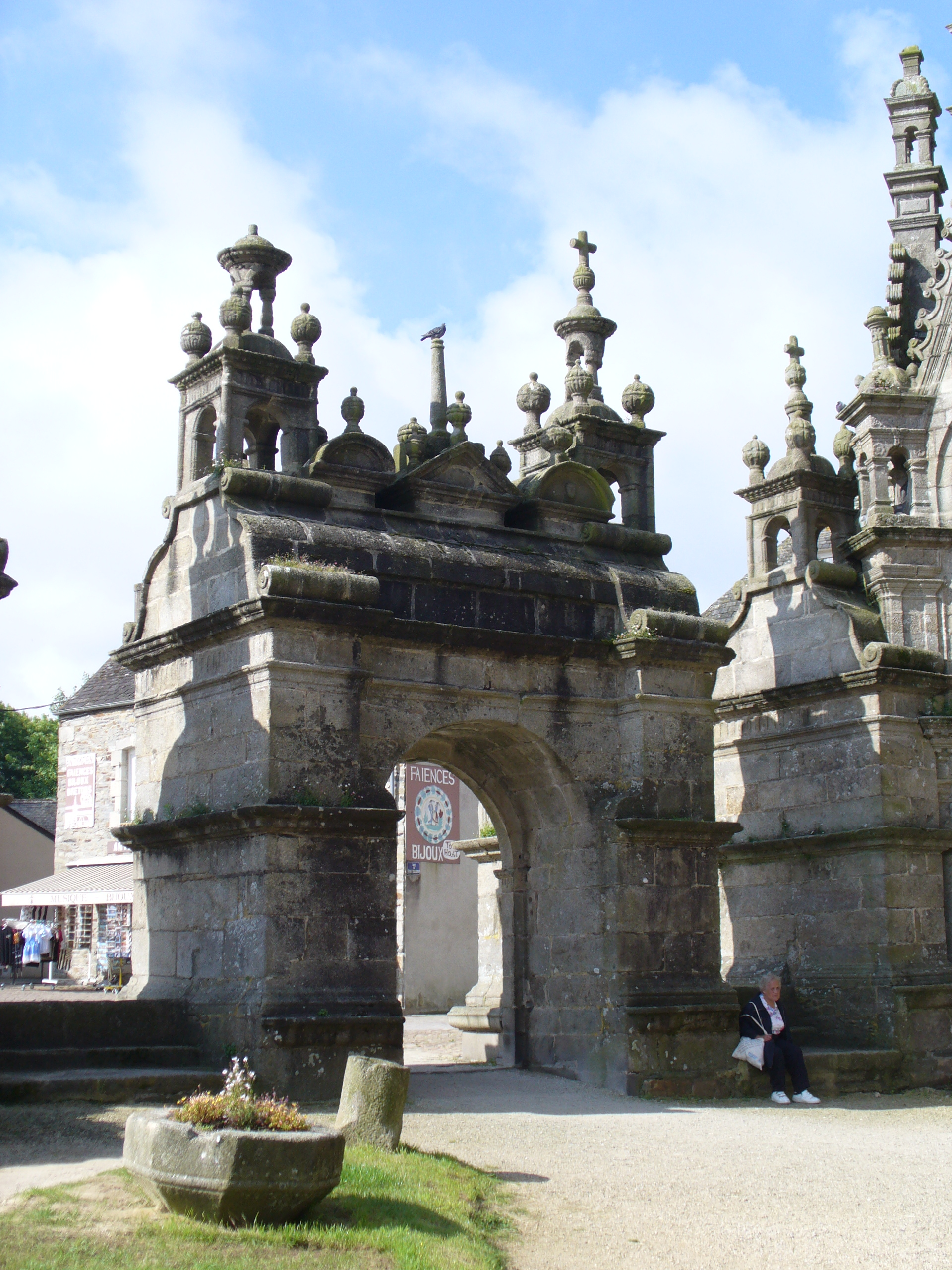
Ceremonial entrance arch.

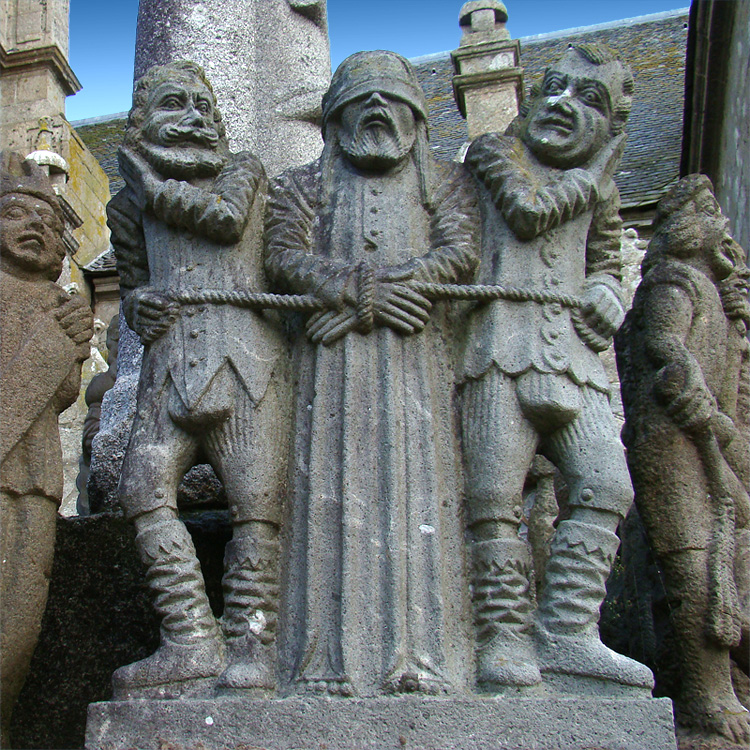
Detail of calvary.

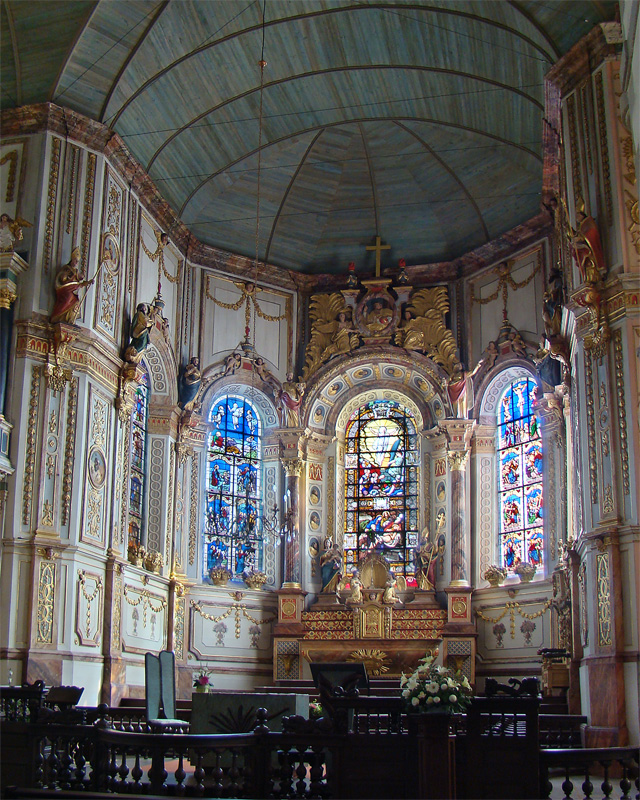
The choir.

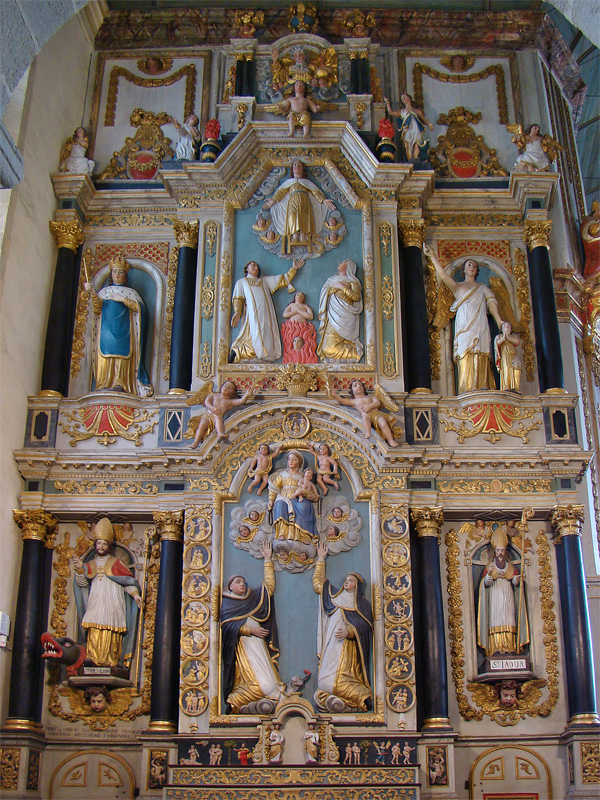
Retable of the Rosary.

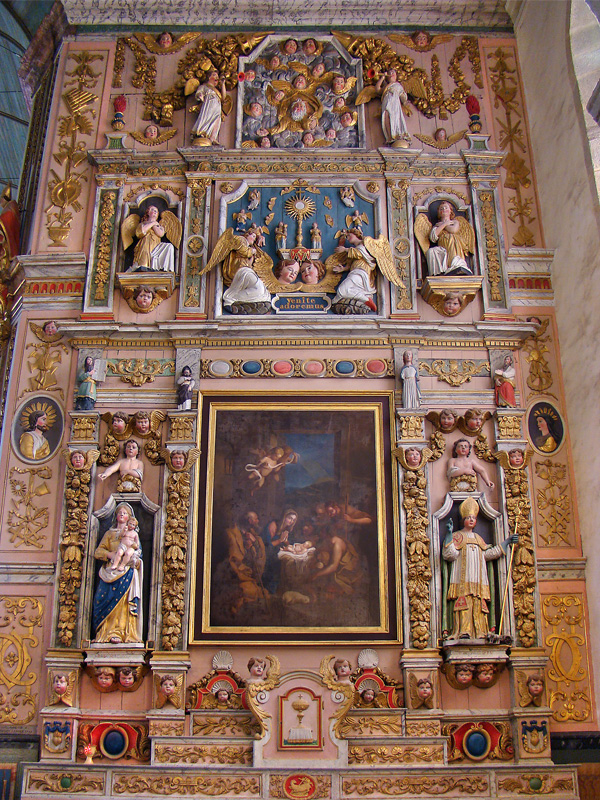
Retable of the Holy Sacrament.

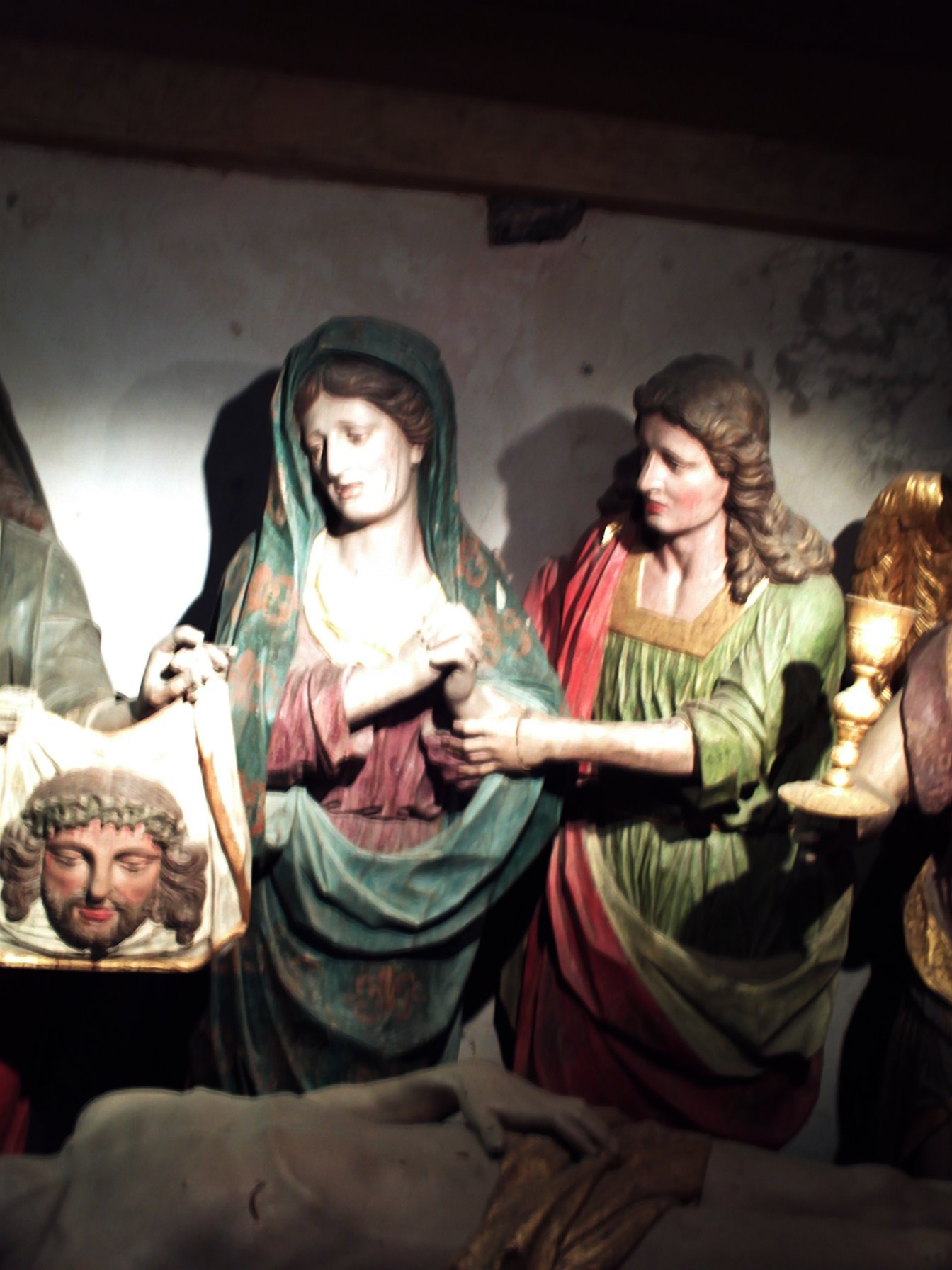
Detail from the Entombment in the ossuary: St John the Apostle and the Virgin Mary.

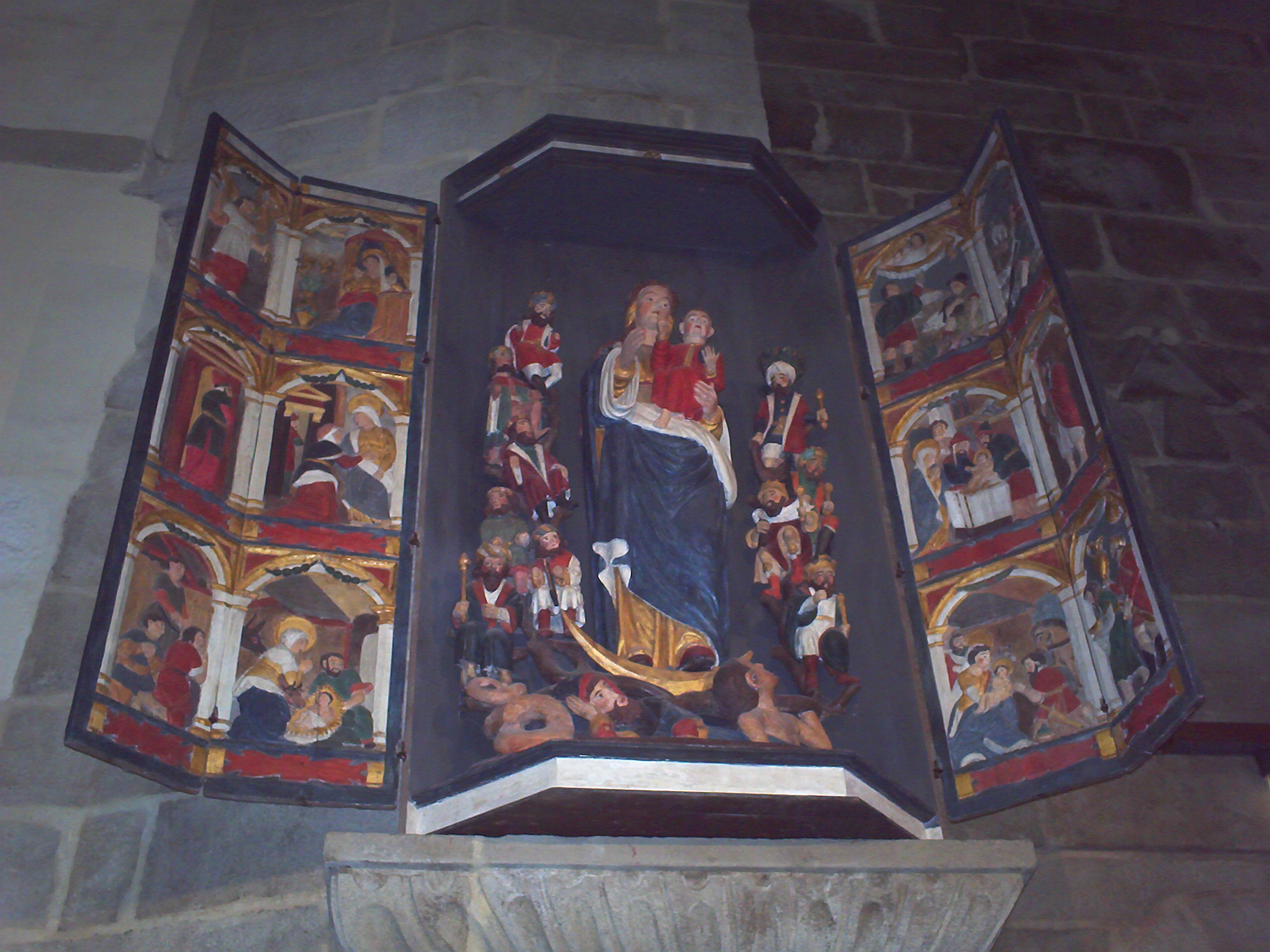
Folding triptych of the Madonna and Child in the parish church.

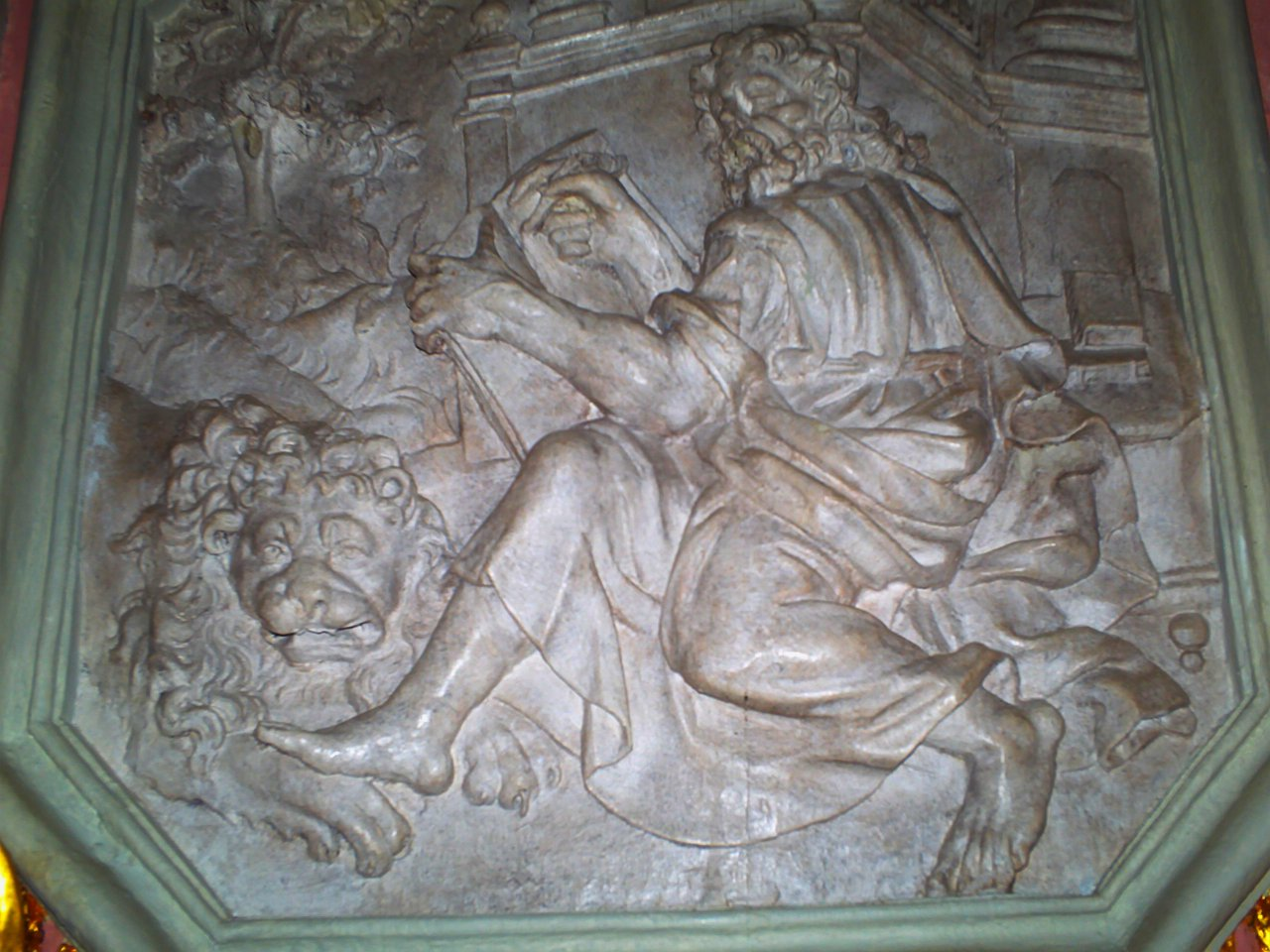
St Mark, from a set of Four Evangelists decorating the pulpit.

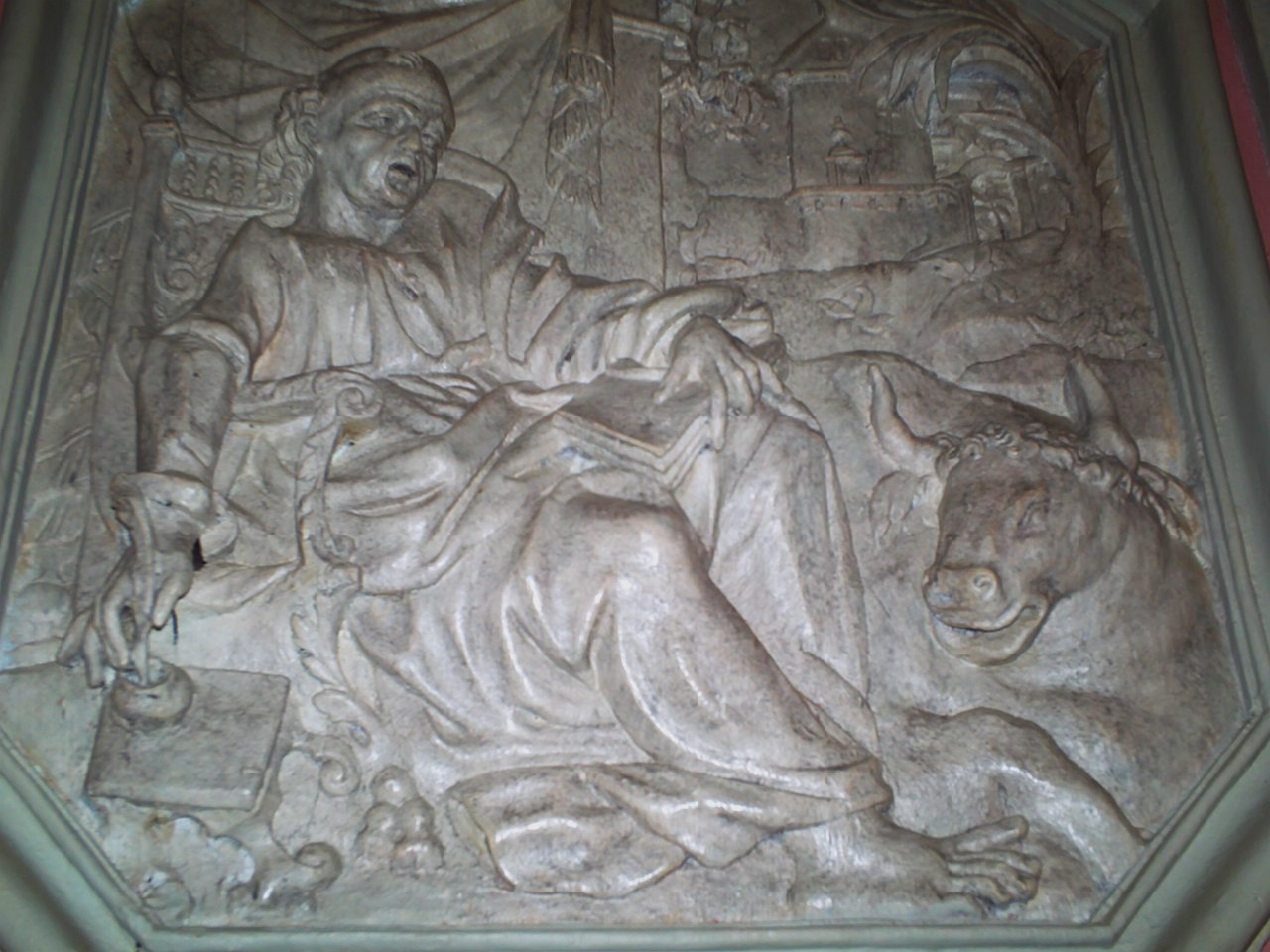
Relief of St Luke on the pulpit.

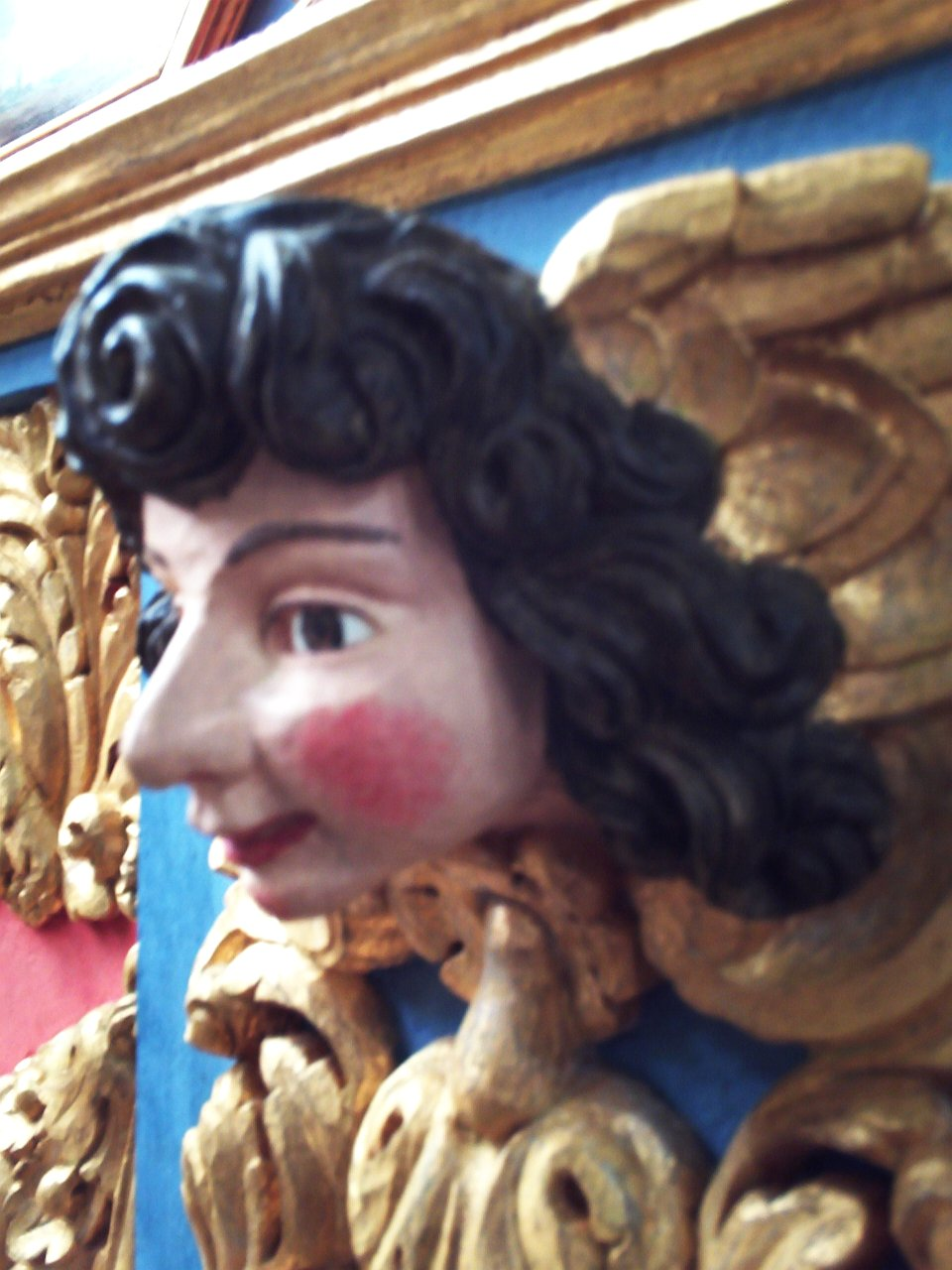
Polychrome decorative moulding from the pulpit.

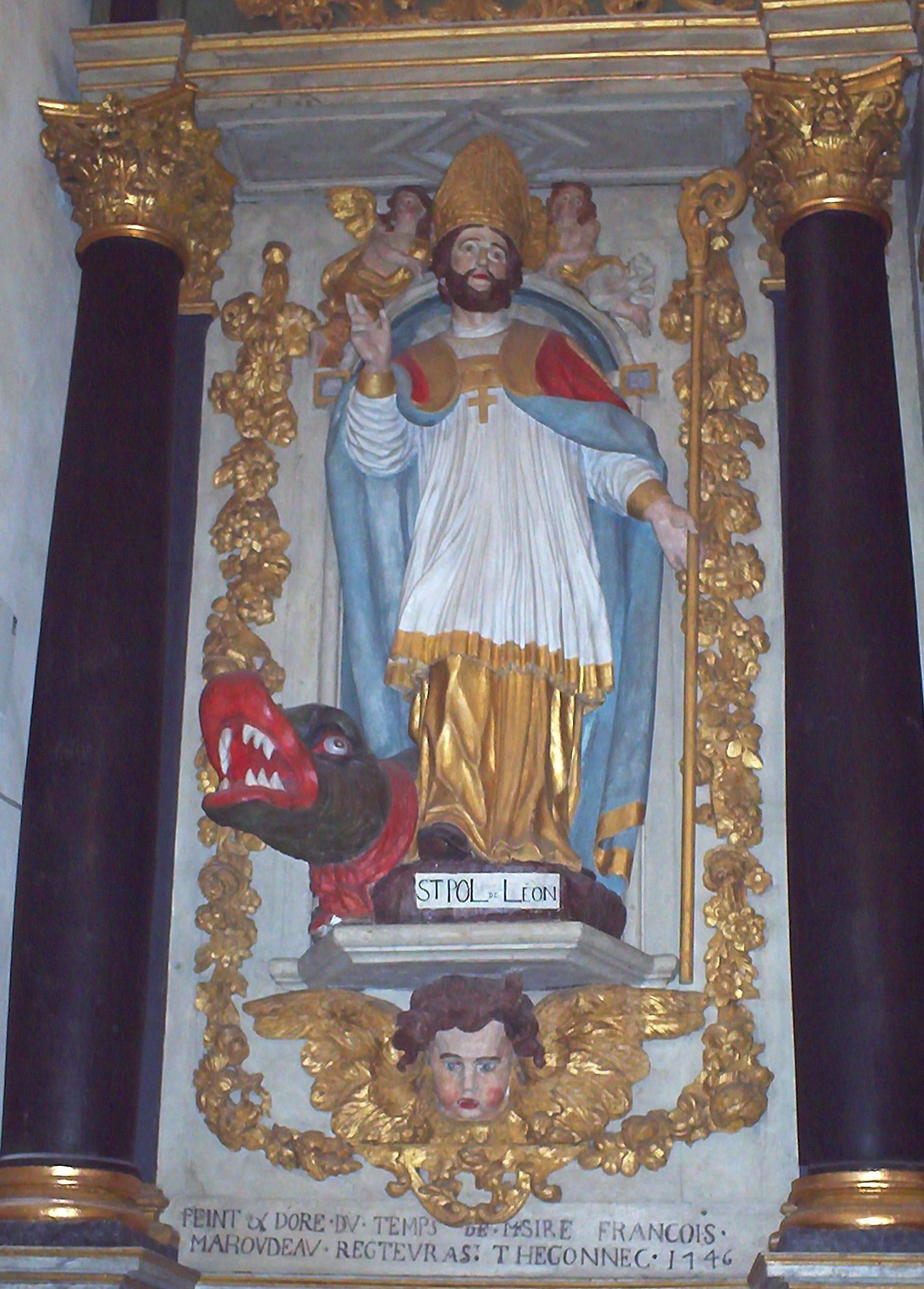
St Pol, an important Breton saint: polychrome statue in the parish church.

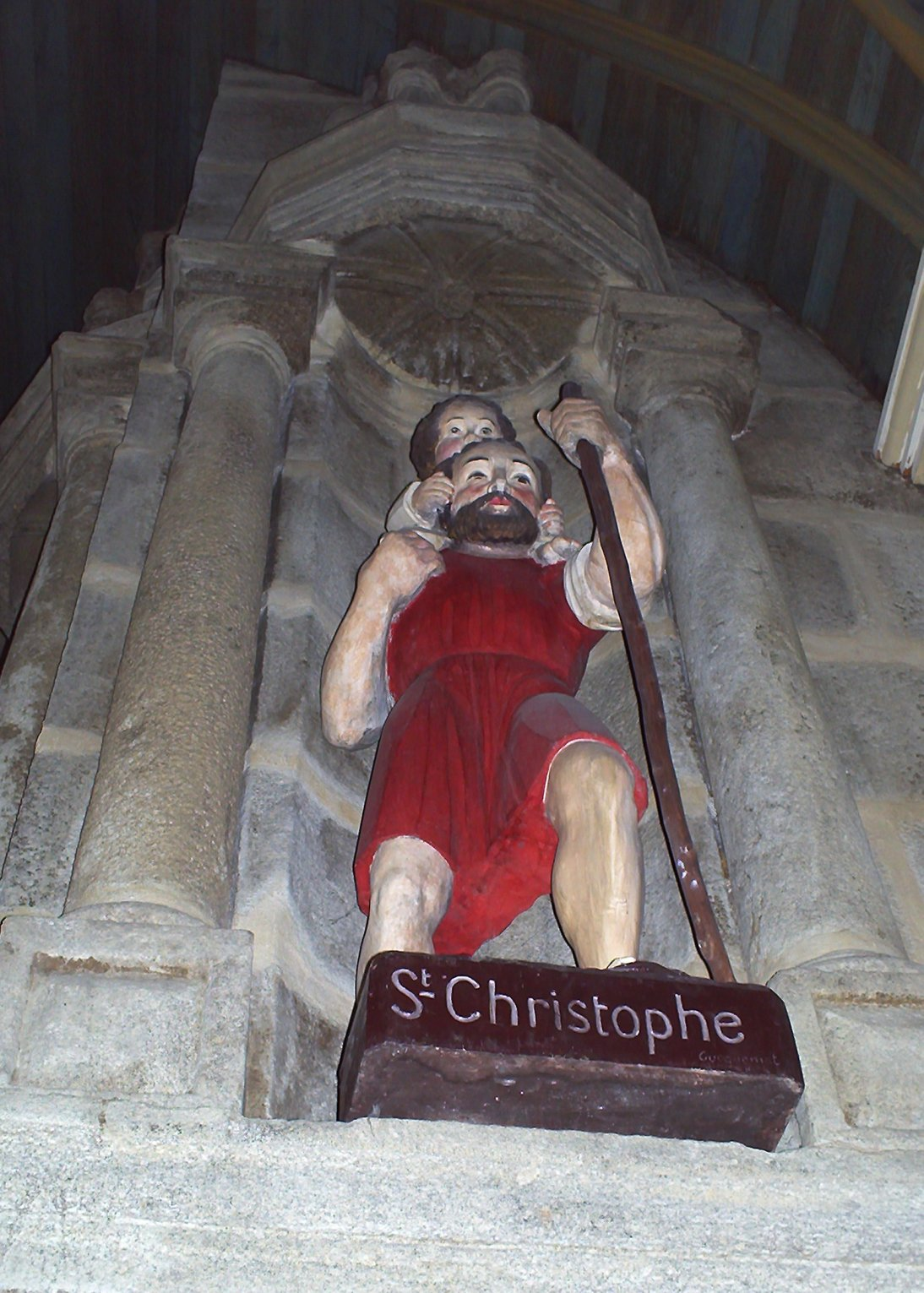
Polychrome statue of St Christopher and the infant Christ in the parish church.

== Twin city ==
- (United Kingdom) Silverton, Devon, England, since 2008.
