= List of the works of the Maître de Thégonnec =

List of the works of the Maître de Thégonnec.

This is a listing/"catalogue raisonnė" of the works of the Maître de Thégonnec. He is best known for his work on the Calvary at Saint-Thégonnec. Here he was responsible for all the statuary except Roland Doré (sculptor)'s "Christ aux outrages". He operated between the years 1550 and 1610. Apart from the grand calvary at Saint-Thégonnec, he worked on another calvary for Saint-Ségal's Saint-Sébastien chapel and a smaller calvary at Locquénolé, near Morlaix. He also added finishing touches to the Calvary at Guimiliau. These apart, the remains of calvaries at Guimiliiau, Saint-Thégonnec, La Roche-Maurice, Lochmélar, Plougastel-Daoulas and Bourg-Blanc show how active the Maître de Thégonnec and his workshop were! He also completed statues for the fountains at Pleyben and Ploudaniel.

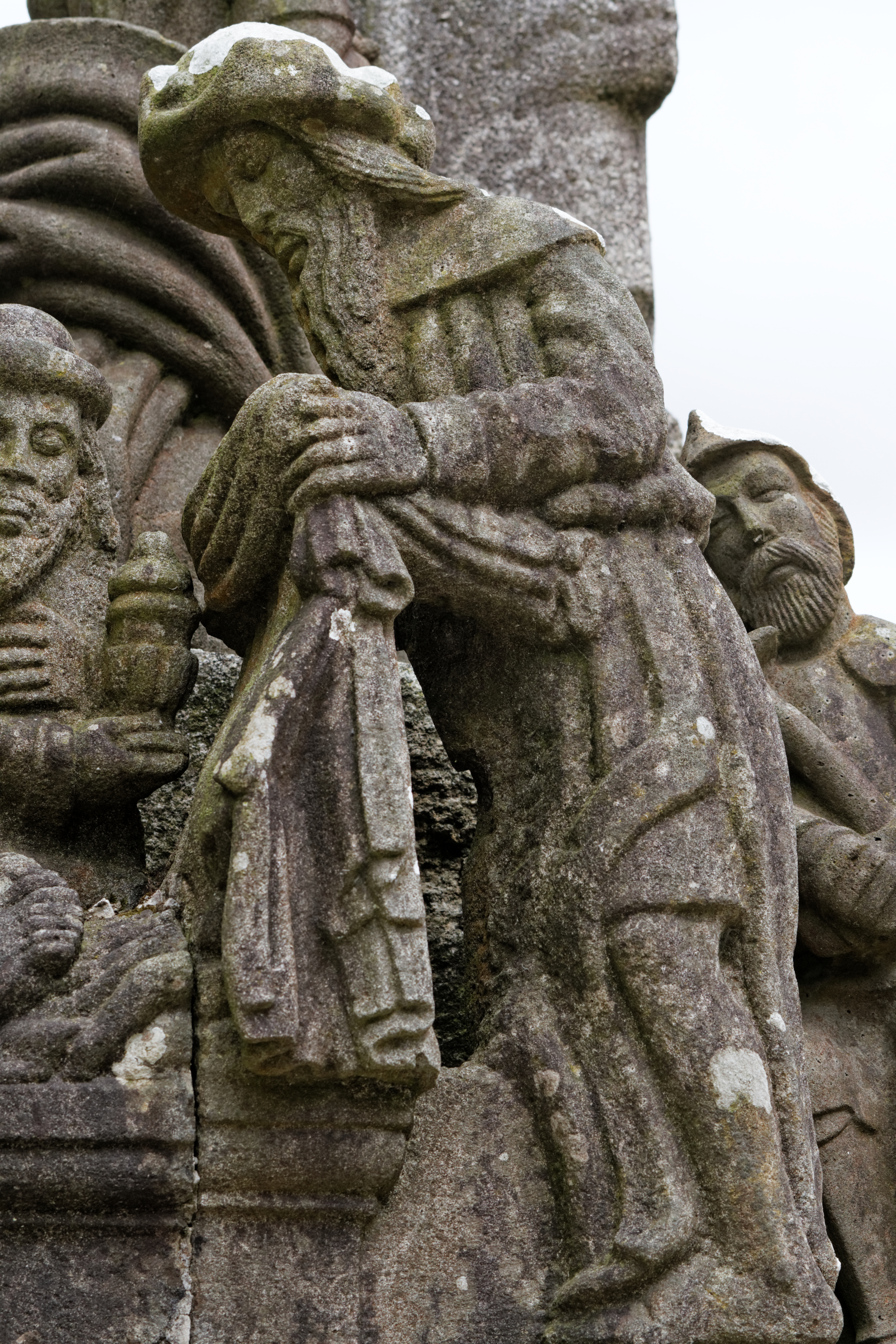
Joseph of Arimathea prepares to cover Jesus' body with a shroud. A scene from the Calvary at Saint-Thégonnec

== Calvaries ==
Type of sculpture	Location	Description|Notes
Cross	La Roche-Maurice	In the ruins of the Pont-Christ chapel are the remains of a cross and the statue of Saint Peter reversed with the Virgin Mary these attributed to the Maître de Thégonnec. See also La Roche-Maurice Parish close.
Calvary of the chapel Saint-Sėbastien	Saint-Ségal	This calvary is attributed to the Maître de Thégonnec. It was created between 1541 and 1550 and the Maître de Thégonnec's work includes the Virgin Mary reversed with an archer, the crucifix reversed with Saint Sėbastien, and John the Evangelist reversed with an archer on one crosspiece as well as angels holding chalices. On the second crosspiece are a cavalier on horseback, various masks, a "Christ lié", a pietà and a second cavalier on horseback. On the pedestal are various bas-reliefs. On the pedestal's east face there is a bas-relief depicting a kneeling Mary Magdalene and on the west face a sleeping soldier and the resurrected Christ. He then added various masks to the pedestal and another sleeping soldier. At Saint-Sėgal the Maître de Thégonnec also added statues of Saints Yves and Saint Francis of Assisi to the arc de triomphe of the Saint-Sėbastien chapel. Various coats of arms were also added to the nodes. One of the archers on the Calvary of the chapel Saint-Sėbastien
Calvary	Plougastel-Daoulas	The "Croas-ar-Vossen" is attributed to the Maître de Thégonnec except for the pietà and two angels with chalices which are by other ateliers.
Remains of a Calvary	Locmélar	A pietà thought to have been part of calvary and attributed to the Maître de Thégonnec can be seen in Locmélar's Église Saint-Mélar. See also Locmélar Parish close.
Remains of a Calvary	Bourg-Blanc	There are the remains of a calvary in the Église Notre-Dame consisting of a statue of John the Evangelist reversed with an unidentified saint. They are kept in a niche in the south porch. Remains of a calvary in Bourg-Blanc's Église Notre-Dame
Church calvary	Guimiliau	See Calvary at Guimiliau. The calvary has statues of the Virgin Mary reversed with Saint Peter and John the Evangelist reversed with Saint Yves attributed to the Maître de Thégonnec. The remaining statues are by the Maître de Guimiliau except for the crucifix which is by Yan Larhantec. Also in the Guimiliau enclos there is a statue of the Virgin Mary with child thought to have been part of a calvary and located on the top of the arc de triomphe. See Guimiliau Parish close
Church Calvary	Locquénolé	The Maître de Thégonnec is attributed with the crucifix reversed with a statue of Saint Guénolé, the statues of John the Evangelist, Mary Magdalene kneeling and the Virgin Mary as well as the angels carrying blazons.

== Fountains ==
Type of sculpture	Location	Description|Notes
The fountain of the Madeleine chapel	Pleyben	The figure of Mary Magdalene is located within a niche of the fountain set into the front of the chapel. It is attributed to the Maître de Thégonnec. See Pleyben Parish close Fountain at the Pleyben chapel
The fountain of the Sainte-Pétronville chapel	Ploudaniel	In a niche in the fountain is a statue of Sainte-Pétronville attributed to the Maître de Thégonnec. Sainte-Pétronville at Ploudaniel
