= Sigel =

Sigel may refer to:

== Surname ==
- Franz Sigel (1824–1902), Union general in the American Civil War
- Elsie Sigel (d. 1909), murder victim, granddaughter of Franz
- Jay Sigel (1943–2025), American golfer
- Mike Sigel (b. 1952), American pool player
- Beanie Sigel (b. 1974), pseudonym of rapper Dwight Grant

== Places ==
- Sigel, Illinois
- Sigel, Chippewa County, Wisconsin
- Sigel, Wood County, Wisconsin
- Sigel Township, Shelby County, Illinois
- Sigel Township, Michigan
- Sigel Township, Minnesota
- Alp Sigel, a summit of the Alpstein massif, Switzerland

== Other ==
- Sigel, the Old English for "Sun", see Sól (Germanic mythology)
- Sowilo rune or Sigel rune
- A magic sign, see Sigil
- Sigel (Oh My Goddess!), a character in the manga series Oh My Goddess!

== See also ==
- Chagall (disambiguation)
- Siegel
- Segal
- Segel
- Sigil (disambiguation)
