= Sagal =

Surname and given name

Sagal is a surname and given name. As a surname it is sometimes a variant of the Ashkenazi Jewish surname Segal. As a female given name of Somali origin it has been said to have meanings of "morning star", "bright star" or "rays of light".

== People with the surname ==
- Ángelo Sagal (born 1993), Chilean footballer
- Boris Sagal (1923-1981), American TV & film director, father of Jean, Joey, Katey and Liz
- Jean Sagal, American TV actress and director, twin of Liz
- Joey Sagal (born 1957), American actor and screenwriter
- Katey Sagal (born 1953), American actress and singer-songwriter
- Liz Sagal, American actress and screenwritet, twin of Jean
- Peter Sagal (born 1965), American radio host

== People with the given name ==
- Sagal Abdi-Wali (born 1984), British politician
- Sagal Salad Osman (c.1992-2016), murdered Somali journalist
