= Bourg-Blanc =

Bourg-Blanc Ar Vourc'h-Wenn
- Commune
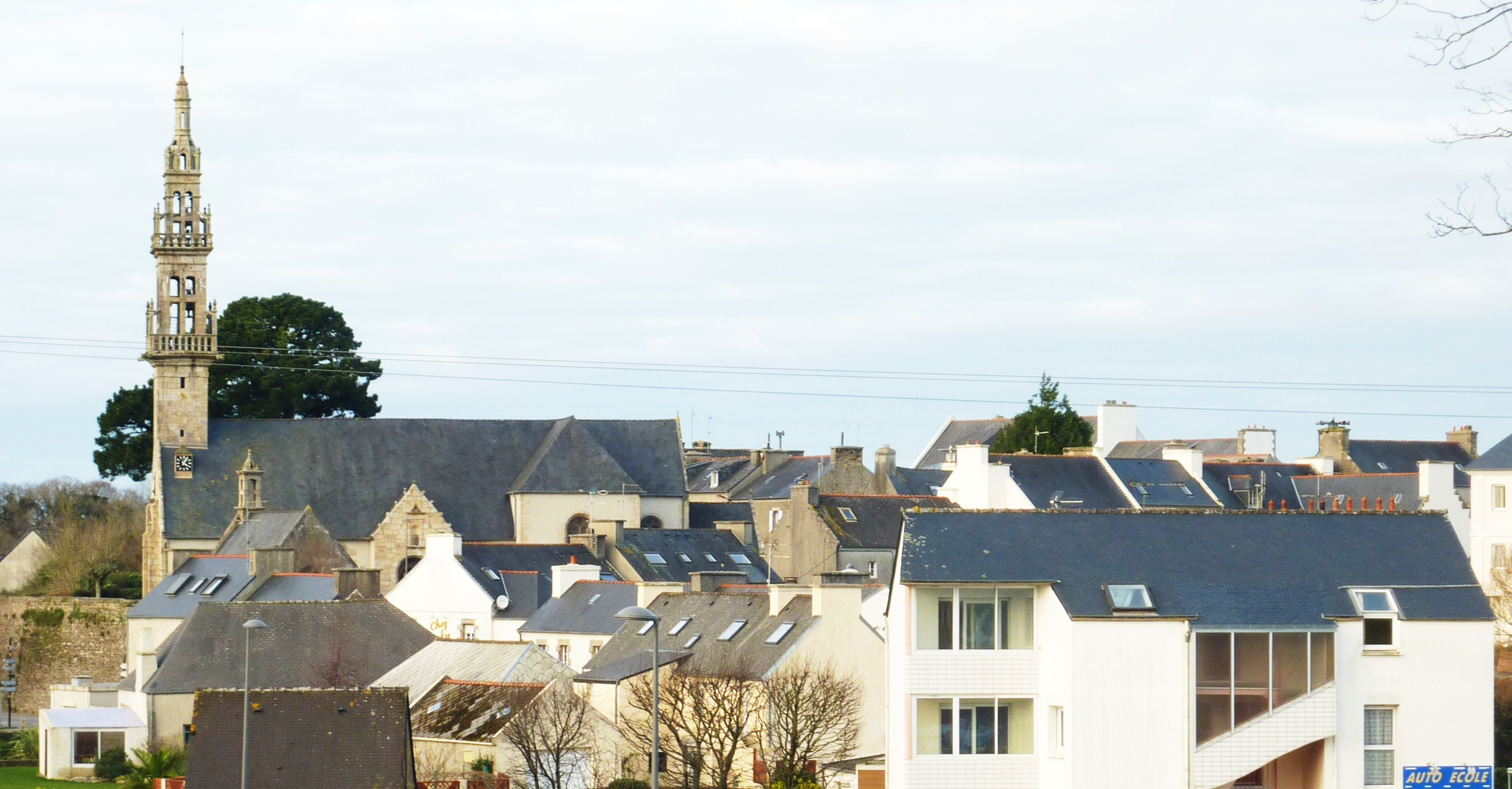
- A general view of Bourg-Blanc

- Coat of arms
- Location of Bourg-Blanc
- Location within France Location within Brittany
- Coordinates: 48°30′01″N 4°30′13″W
- Country: France
- Region: Brittany
- Department: Finistère
- Arrondissement: Brest
- Canton: Plabennec

Government
  - Mayor (2020–2026): Bernard Gibergues
- Area^{1}: 28.31 km^{2} (10.93 sq mi)
- Highest elevation: 98 m (322 ft)
- Lowest elevation: 25 m (82 ft)
- Population (2023): 3,573
  - Density: 126.2/km^{2} (326.9/sq mi)
- Time zone: UTC+01:00 (CET)
  - Summer (DST): UTC+02:00 (CEST)
- INSEE/Postal code: 29015 /29860
- ^{1} French Land Register data, which excludes lakes, ponds, glaciers > 1 km^{2} (0.386 sq mi or 247 acres) and river estuaries.

Bourg-Blanc (French pronunciation: [buʁ blɑ̃]; Breton: Ar Vourc'h-Wenn) is a commune in the Finistère department of Brittany in north-western France.

== Population ==
Inhabitants of Bourg-Blanc are called Blanc-Bourgeois in French.

Historical population

Year	Pop.	±% p.a.
1793	1,444	—
1800	1,561	+1.12%
1806	1,617	+0.59%
1821	1,746	+0.51%
1831	1,729	−0.10%
1836	1,868	+1.56%
1841	1,831	−0.40%
1846	1,841	+0.11%
1851	1,920	+0.84%
1856	1,867	−0.56%
1861	1,848	−0.20%
1866	1,824	−0.26%
1872	1,761	−0.58%
1876	1,808	+0.66%
1881	1,826	+0.20%
1886	1,767	−0.65%
1891	1,708	−0.68%
1896	1,666	−0.50%
1901	1,684	+0.22%

Year	Pop.	±% p.a.
1906	1,712	+0.33%
1911	1,762	+0.58%
1921	1,610	−0.90%
1926	1,593	−0.21%
1931	1,626	+0.41%
1936	1,651	+0.31%
1946	1,699	+0.29%
1954	1,675	−0.18%
1962	1,682	+0.05%
1968	1,784	+0.99%
1975	2,290	+3.63%
1982	2,659	+2.16%
1990	2,971	+1.40%
1999	3,077	+0.39%
2007	3,207	+0.52%
2012	3,402	+1.19%
2017	3,568	+0.96%
2023	3,573	+0.02%

Source: EHESS and INSEE (1968-2023)

== See also ==
- Communes of the Finistère department
- List of the works of the Maître de Thégonnec
