= Calvary at Saint-Thégonnec =

Coordinates: 48°31′19″N 3°56′43″W

The Calvary at Saint-Thégonnec is part of the enclosure (enclos paroissial) of the parish church of Notre-Dame in Saint-Thégonnec. Erected in 1610 it is the last of the monumental calvaries of Brittany. See also Saint-Thégonnec Parish close.

== Background and description of the calvary ==
Apart from Roland Doré's "Christ aux outrages", and the crucifixion cross attributed to Yann Larhantec, the sculptural work on this calvary has been attributed to the Maître de Saint-Thégonnec's workshop, who are also credited with work on the calvary of the St Sébastien Chapel at Saint-Ségal and another at Locquénolé near Morlaix. In 1794, during the course of the French revolution, the calvary was knocked down but the local people managed to save the sculptures and hide them away, although some were lost. The calvary was the subject of a major restoration in 1970 by the organization Mainponte de Paris. The scenes depicted on the calvary relate to Jesus Christ's passion, his death and his resurrection and, in addition, there is a statue of St Thégonnec himself complete with the depiction of a wolf. (Note: According to Breton legend, St Thégonnec's cart was attacked by wolves who ate the stag pulling it. He was using the cart to carry stones used to build his church. The saint pacified one of the wolves and showed it how to pull the carriage. Thereafter depictions of the saint are usually accompanied by a depiction of a wolf. St Thégonnec was a follower of St Pol Aurélien.)

== The south face ==
The sculptures on this face depict Jesus Christ's arrest and the Mocking of Jesus ("Christ aux outrages"). The two people shown in the arrest sequence who carry phylacteries are almost certainly the priests sent to arrest Jesus. They carry law scrolls and are accompanied by a guard who has a sword tucked into his belt.

== The three crosses ==
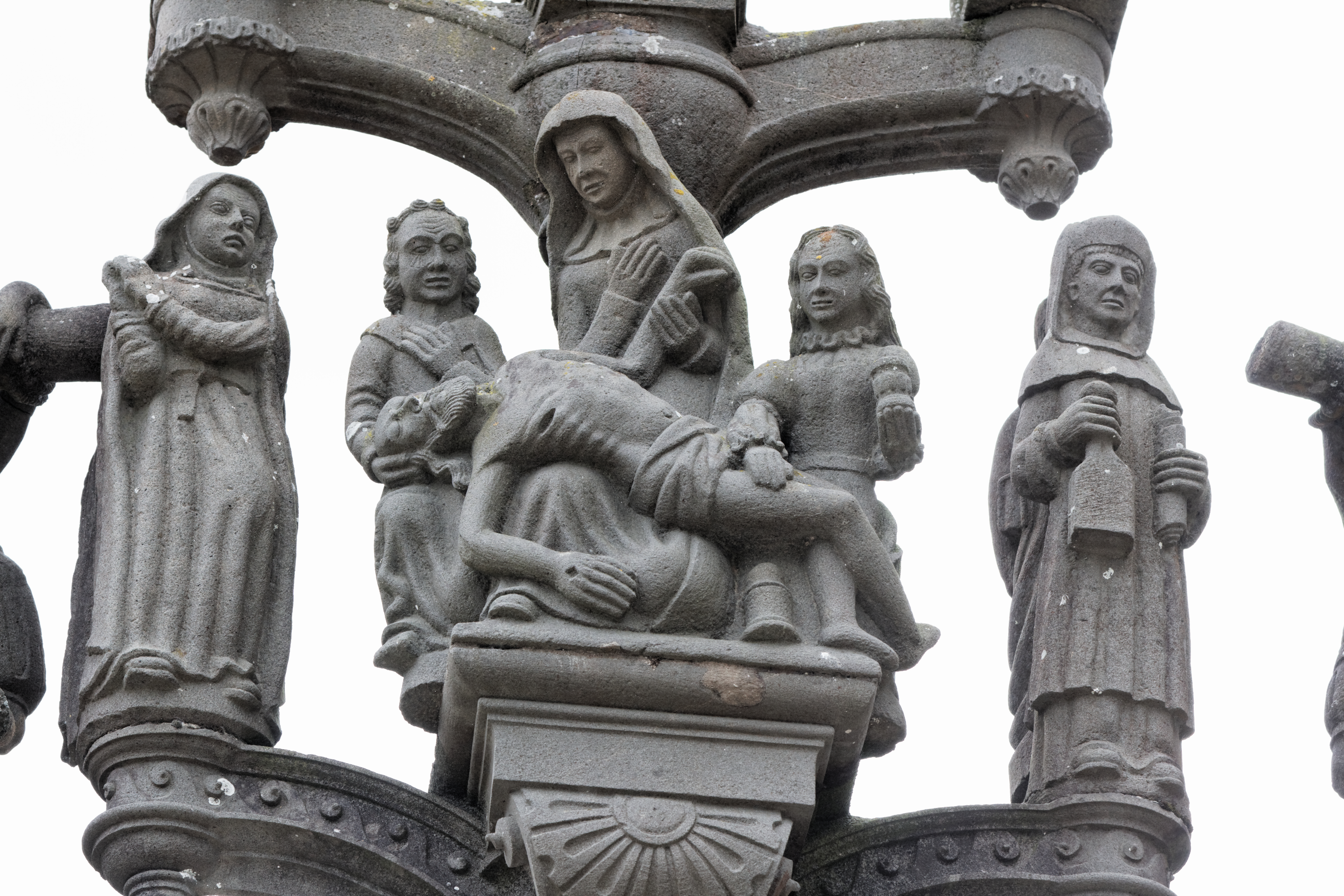
The pietà on the crucifixion cross. The Virgin Mary puts her right hand on her chest and holds her dead son's hand. Note the stigmata in Jesus' right hand. On the far left of the crosspiece is a statue of Mary Magdalene holding her pot of ointment. In the pietà, there are depictions of Mary Magdalene and John the Evangelist on each side of Mary. They both touch Jesus' body

On the calvary platform are three crosses. We see Jesus on the central cross with four angels collecting his blood and on the reverse an "Ecce Homo". Jesus has a horsed cavalier on either side of him and on the lower crosspiece there is a depiction of the Virgin Mary holding the baby Jesus, with St Peter on one side and John the Evangelist on the other, whilst on the reverse of these three figures there is a pietà in the centre with the Virgin Mary on one side and St Yves on the other. There are two smaller crosses, one on each side of the crucifixion cross, from which the two robbers hang. The good robber turns to Jesus whilst the bad robber turns away from him. At the foot of the main cross there is a statue of Mary Magdalene looking up towards Jesus and on the pedestal platform a "mise au tombeau" and a depiction of Jesus' resurrection.

== The east face ==
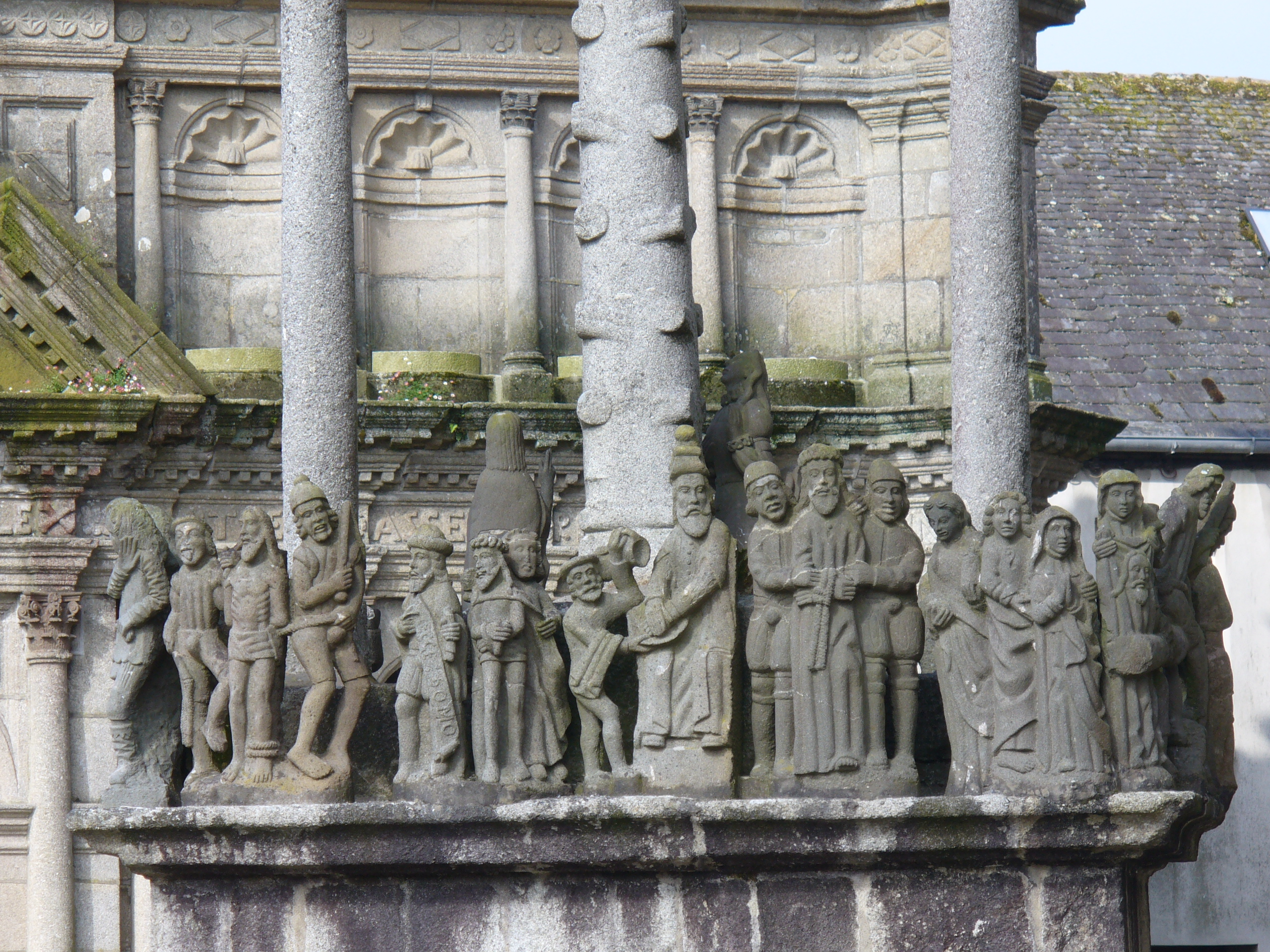
The calvary at Saint-Thégonnec. In this view of the calvary we start on the left side with Jesus being flogged by two men and then a priest holding a banner bearing the inscription "Ecce Homo". Jesus stands behind him wearing a robe and the crown of thorns. He is held by a soldier. We then see a Pontius Pilate in the act of washing his hands whilst a servant holds out a bowl of water and a towel. He watches Jesus being led away by two soldiers. We finish with some women at the tail end of the procession depicting Jesus carrying the cross to Golgotha

On the east face and from left to right we have sculptures dealing with the Flagellation of Christ, an "Ecce Homo", Pontius Pilate washing his hands, Jesus held by soldiers, the scene depicting the cortege accompanying Christ carrying the cross, Jesus' meeting with Mary Magdalene (Resurrection appearances of Jesus), St Veronica with her veil and Mary Magdalene with a pot of ointment.

- In the flagellation scene, Jesus is tied to a pillar whilst being whipped by two soldiers. One has his back to Jesus and the other seems to be enjoying what he is doing, his tongue stuck out.
- In the next scene a pharisee, law scrolls in his hand, points to a banner across his chest which reads "Ecce Homo". Jesus turns towards him, his hands tied with rope. He wears the so-called "royal robe" and the crown of thorns. The soldier accompanying him appears to be pushing him forward.
- Then we see Pontius Pilate washing his hands after he has effectively condemned Jesus to death. Then we see Jesus being led away by two soldiers to be crucified.
- In the scene depicting the cortege accompanying Jesus carrying the cross to Calvary/Golgotha we see three women following at the end of the procession, the first of whom has her hands clasped in prayer. The actual depiction of Jesus carrying the cross appears around the corner on the next face.

== The north face ==
On this face we have a depiction of Jesus carrying the cross, Simon of Cyrene helping him. Jesus is surrounded by four executioners. The actions of these soldiers are clearly intended to make Jesus' task of carrying the cross more difficult.

== The west face ==
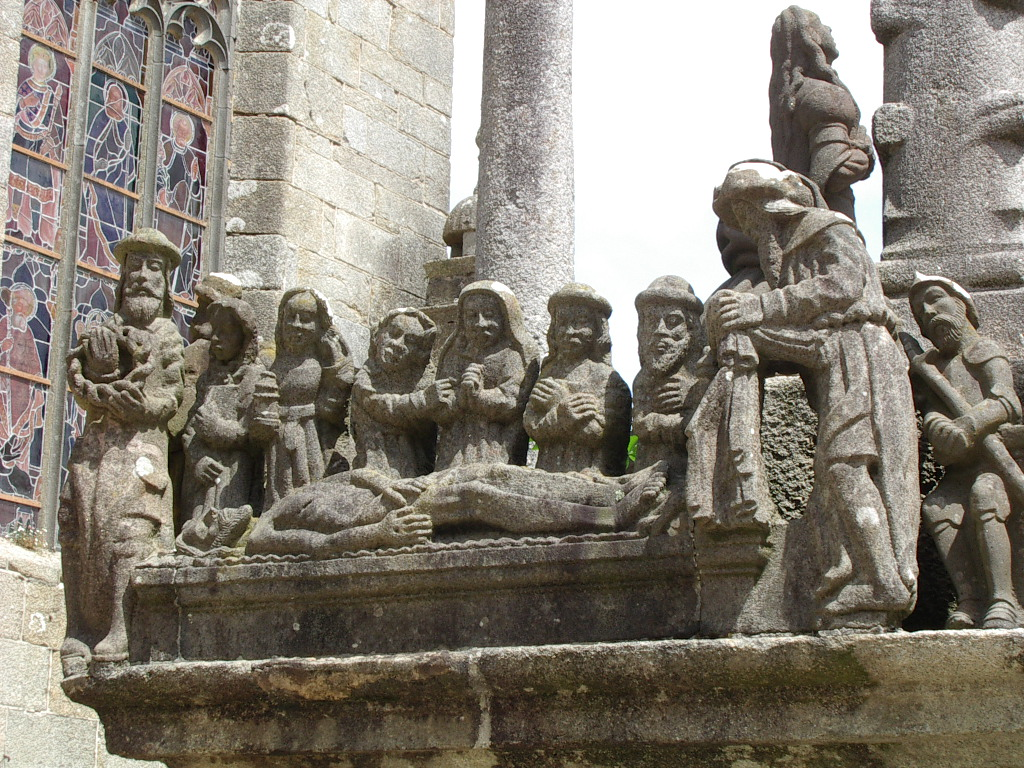
In the "mise au tombeau", (literally the "laying in the tomb") scene, Jesus' body is being prepared for burial. At Jesus', Nicodemus holds the now discarded Crown of thorns and at Jesus' feet Joseph of Arimathea is depicted holding a shroud. We see Mary Magdalene holding her pot of ointment and the Virgin Mary being comforted by St John. Behind this group and at the foot of the cross we see Mary Magdalene looking up at Jesus. Around the body we see the Virgin Mary being comforted by John the Evangelist and Mary Magdalene holding a pot of ointment. Just behind this group we can see Mary Magdalene kneeling at the base of the cross as she looks up at the crucified Jesus

On this face we have the entombment and the resurrection.

- In the "mise au tombeau" scene there are eight people around the body of Jesus. St John holds the Virgin Mary's arm as he turns towards her. The female saint (thought to be Mary Salome) next to Joseph of Arimathea looks towards him as he holds the crown of thorns. Gamaliel has his arms crossed against his chest and next to him another holds a pot of embalming oil. Joseph of Arimathea, the largest of the figures portrayed, stands in silhouette and prepares to cover the body with the shroud he is holding.
- In the resurrection scene the two sleeping guards sit on either side of the tomb whilst another is stretched out fast asleep on the ground in front of the tomb. There are two other soldiers in the rear who are just awakening. Jesus emerges from the tomb lifting one arm to give a blessing.

Also at the front of the west face there is a small statue of St Thégonnec.

== Christ being mocked ==
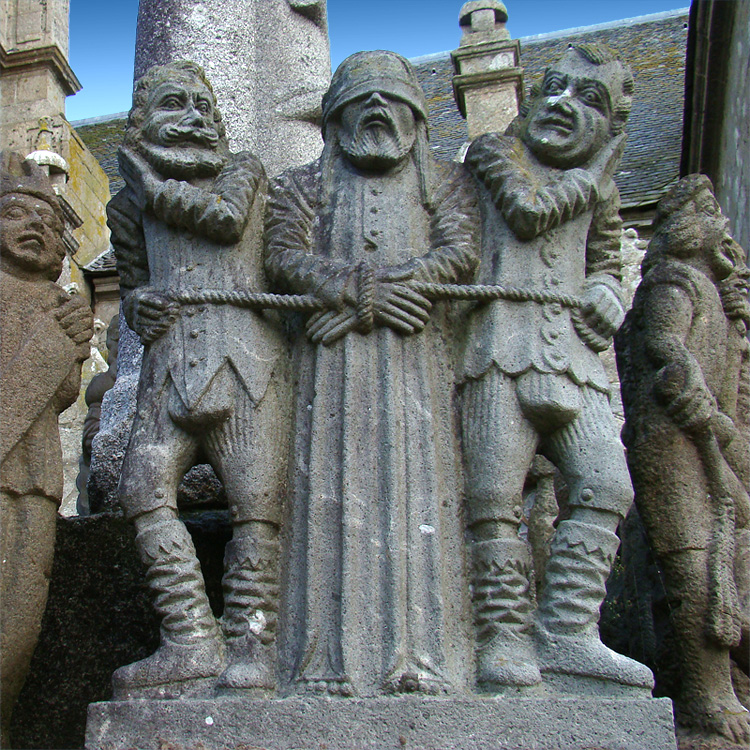
Roland Doré's depiction of Jesus being mocked

The "Christ aux outrages" sculpture at St Thégonnec was added by Roland Doré. Christ is blindfolded and as he is hit the executioners ask mockingly "who hit you?".

== Gallery ==
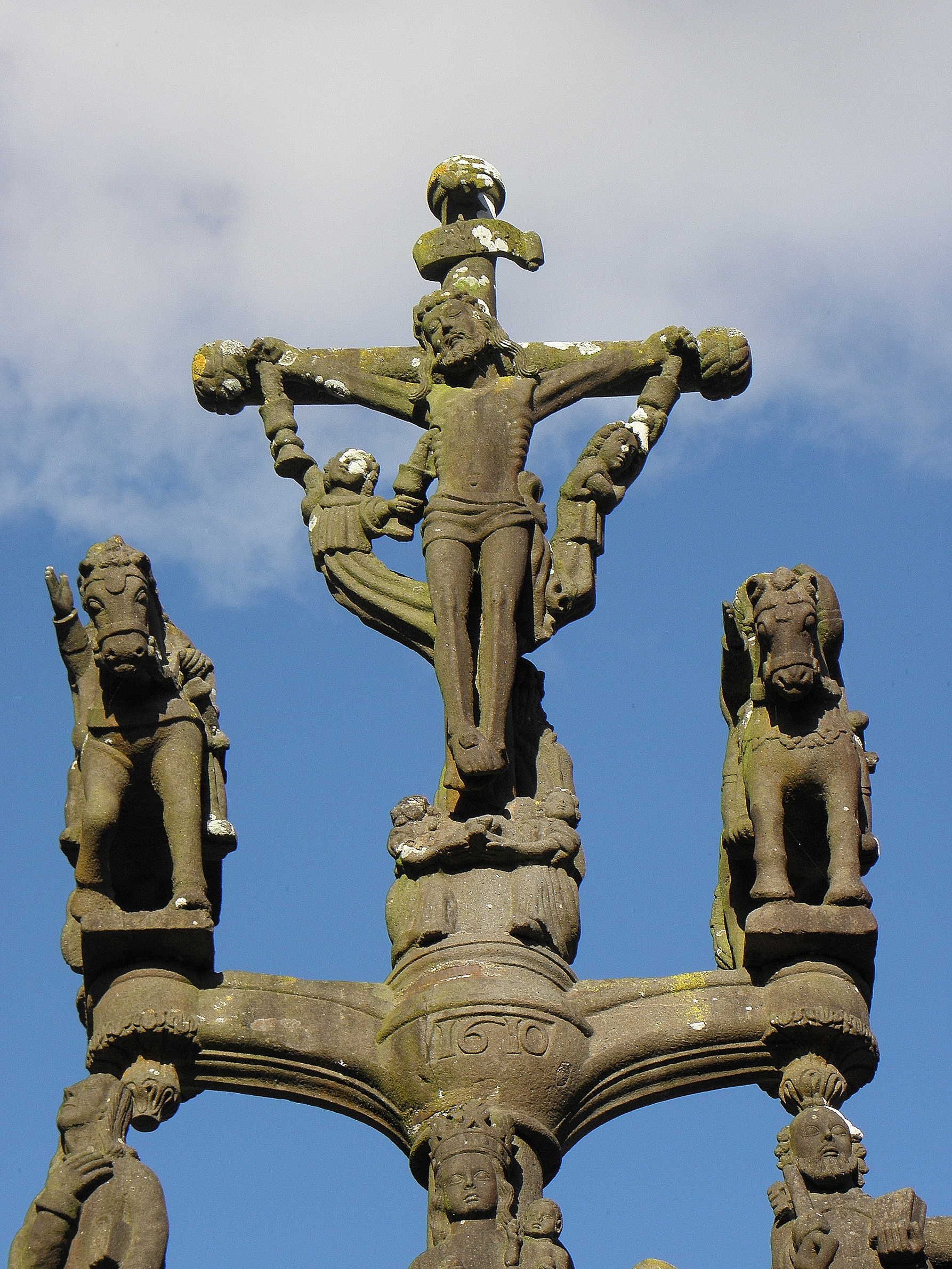
Jesus on the cross with angels holding chalices to collect his blood. Below are two horsed cavaliers

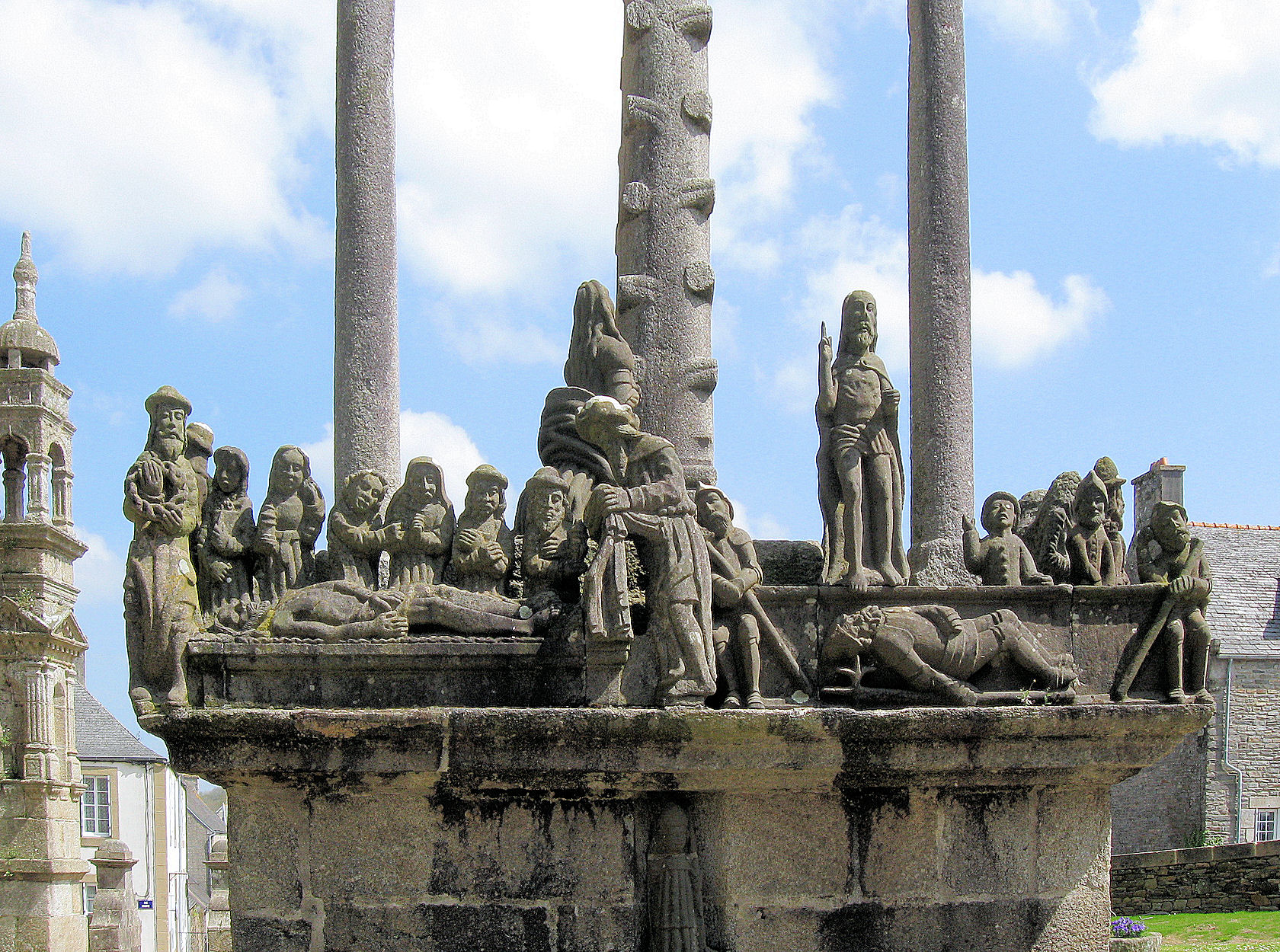
The west face with the Entombment and the Resurrection

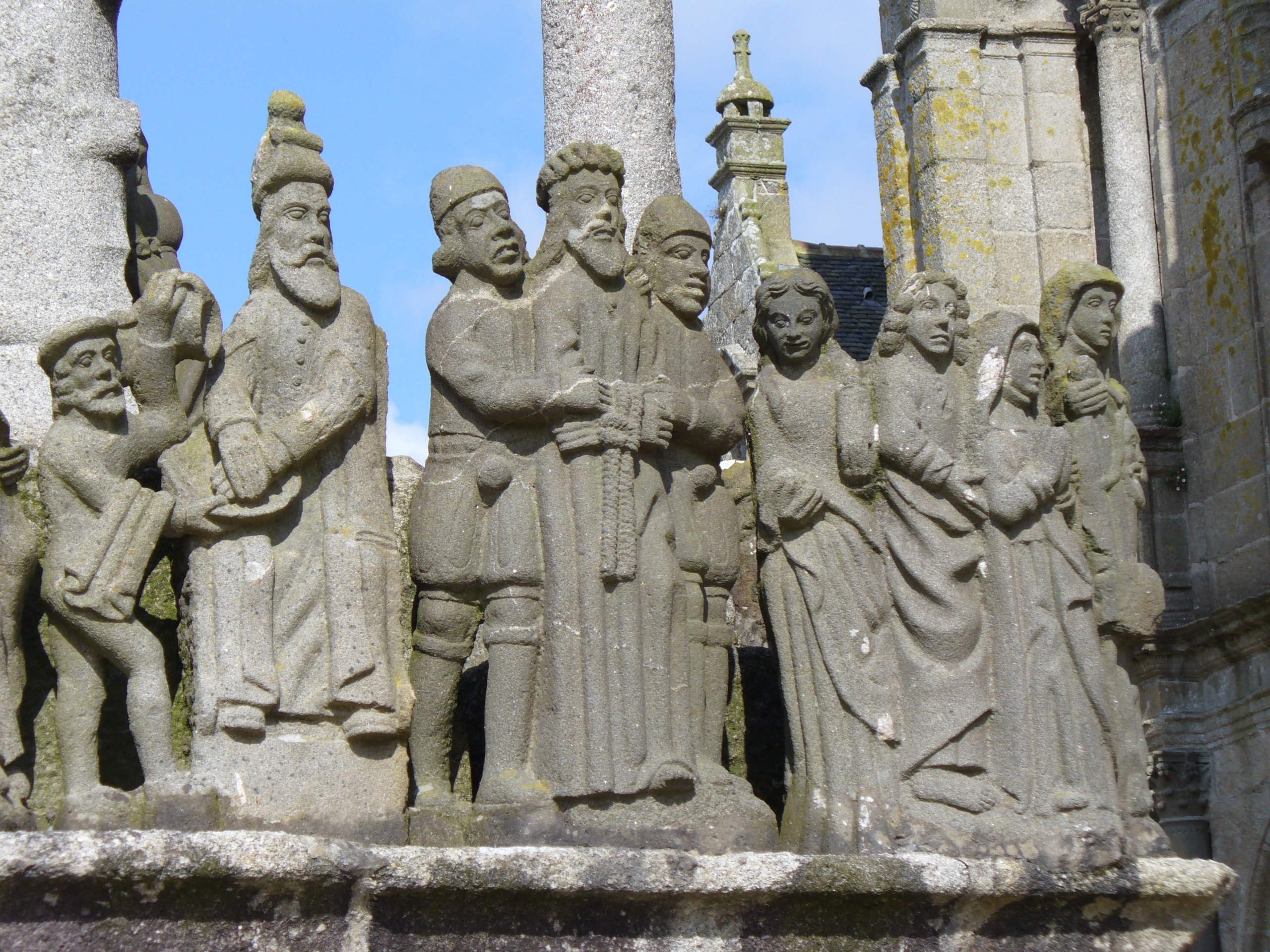
In this scene Jesus is being led away from his appearance before Pontius Pilate who has started washing his hands in a basin held by a servant

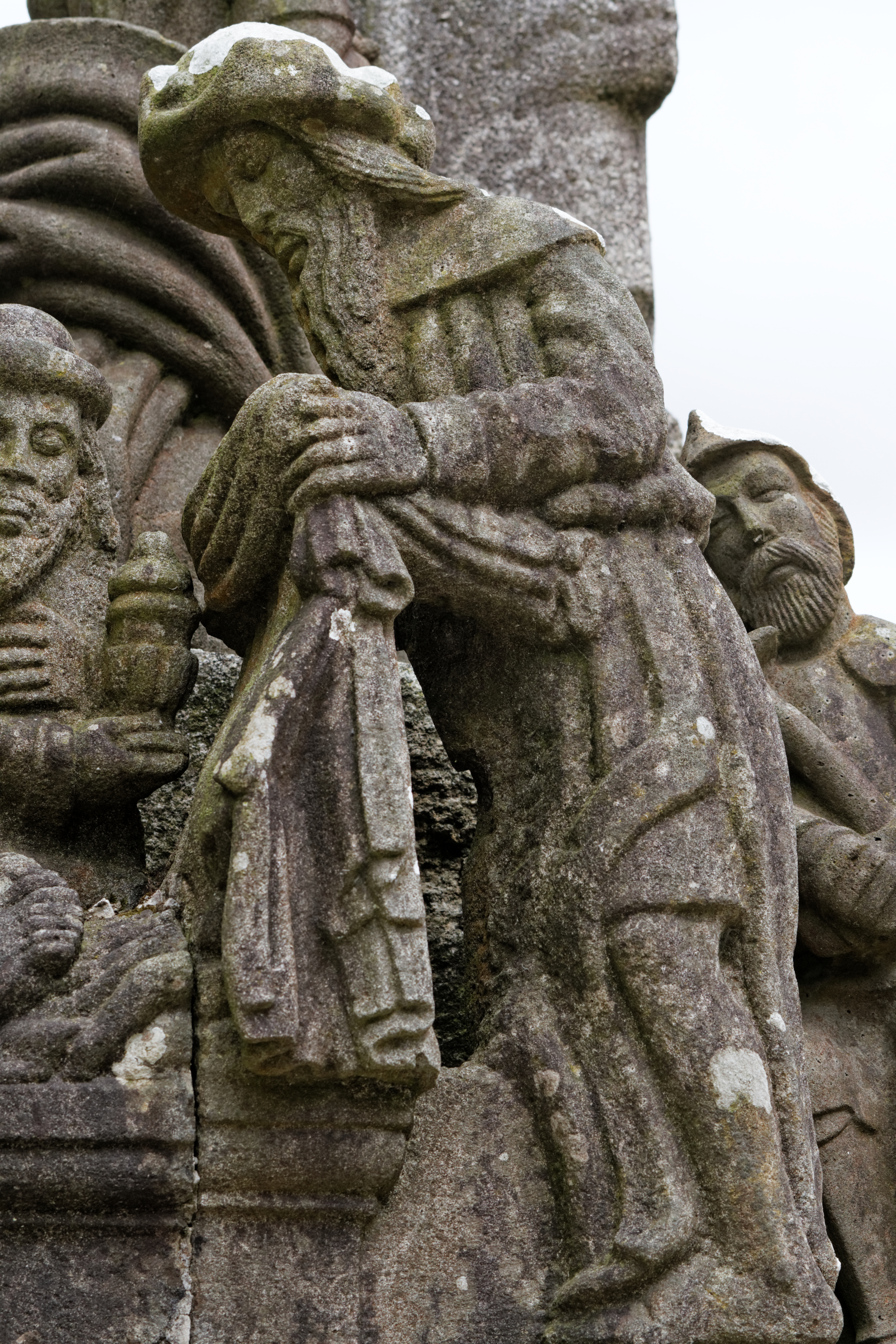
Joseph of Arimathea prepares to cover Jesus with a shroud

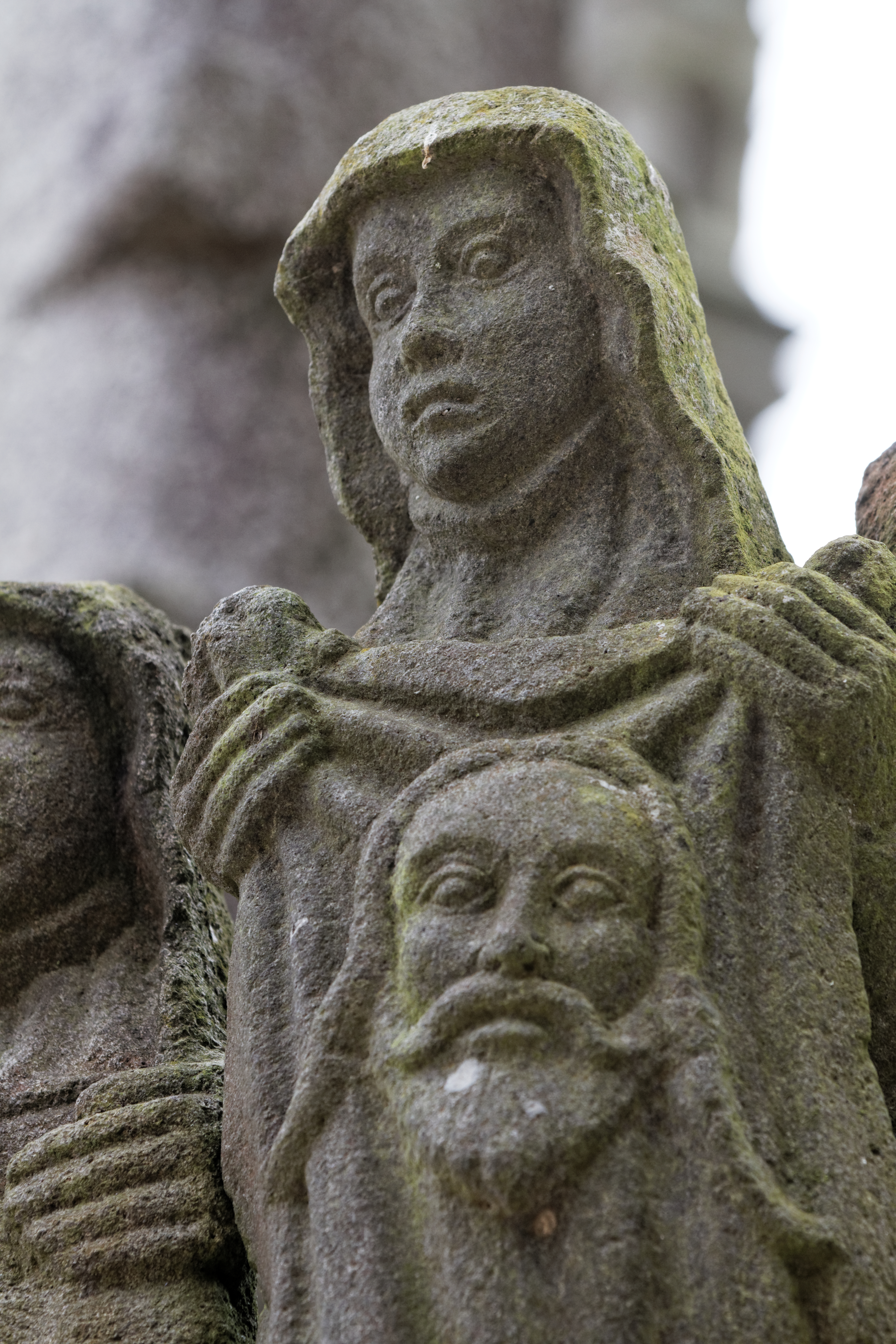
St Veronica holds up her veil now bearing Jesus' image

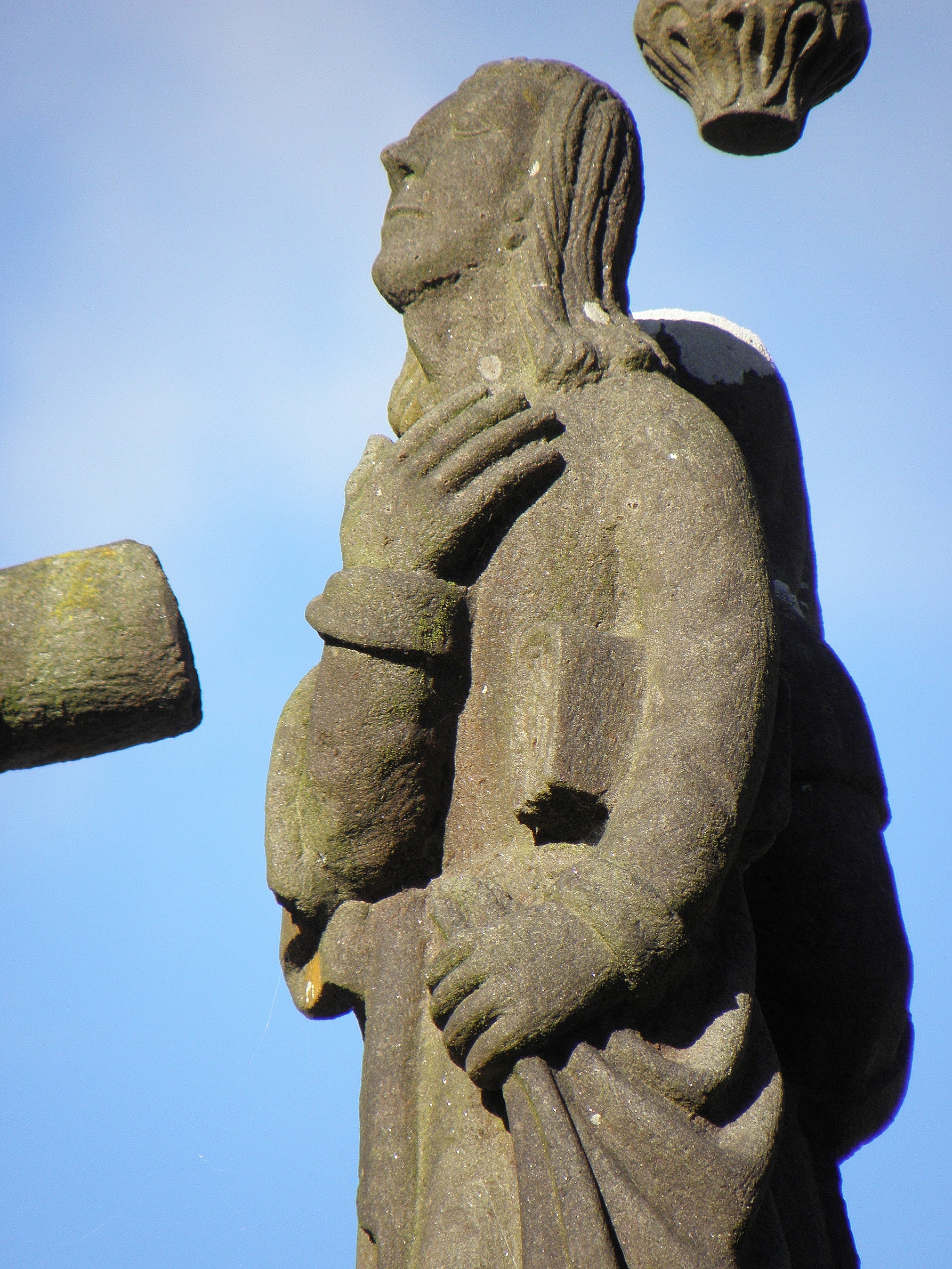
The statue of John the Evangelist on the cross' crosspiece. He has a book tucked under his left arm

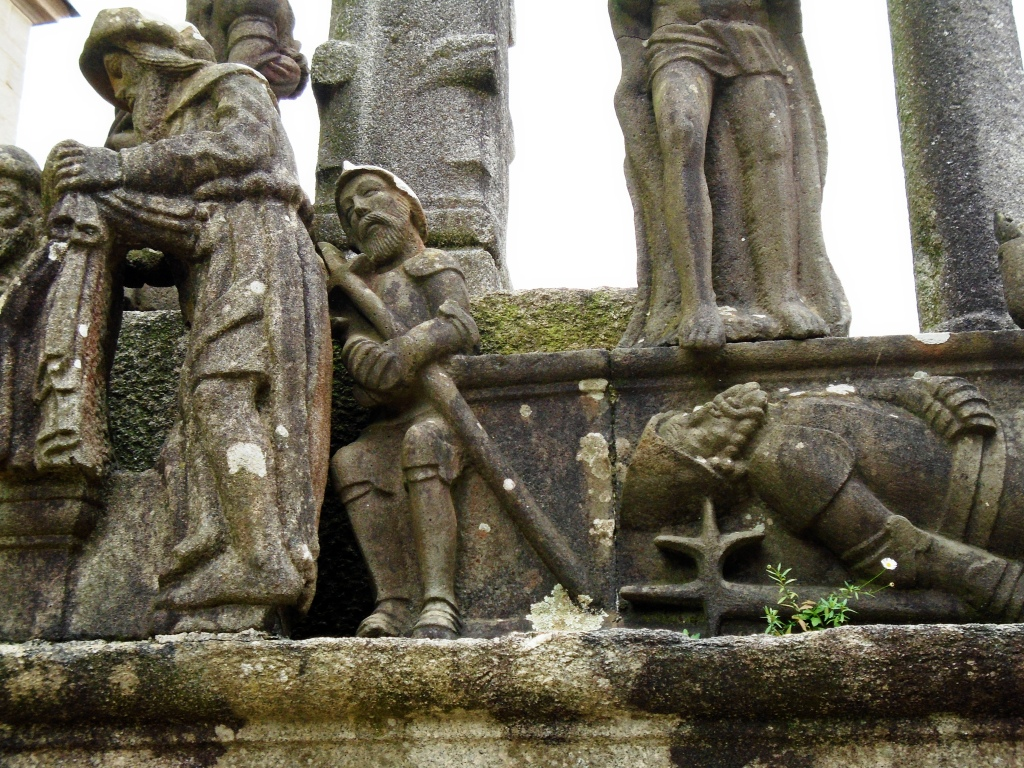
Guards sleep as the resurrected Christ steps from the tomb

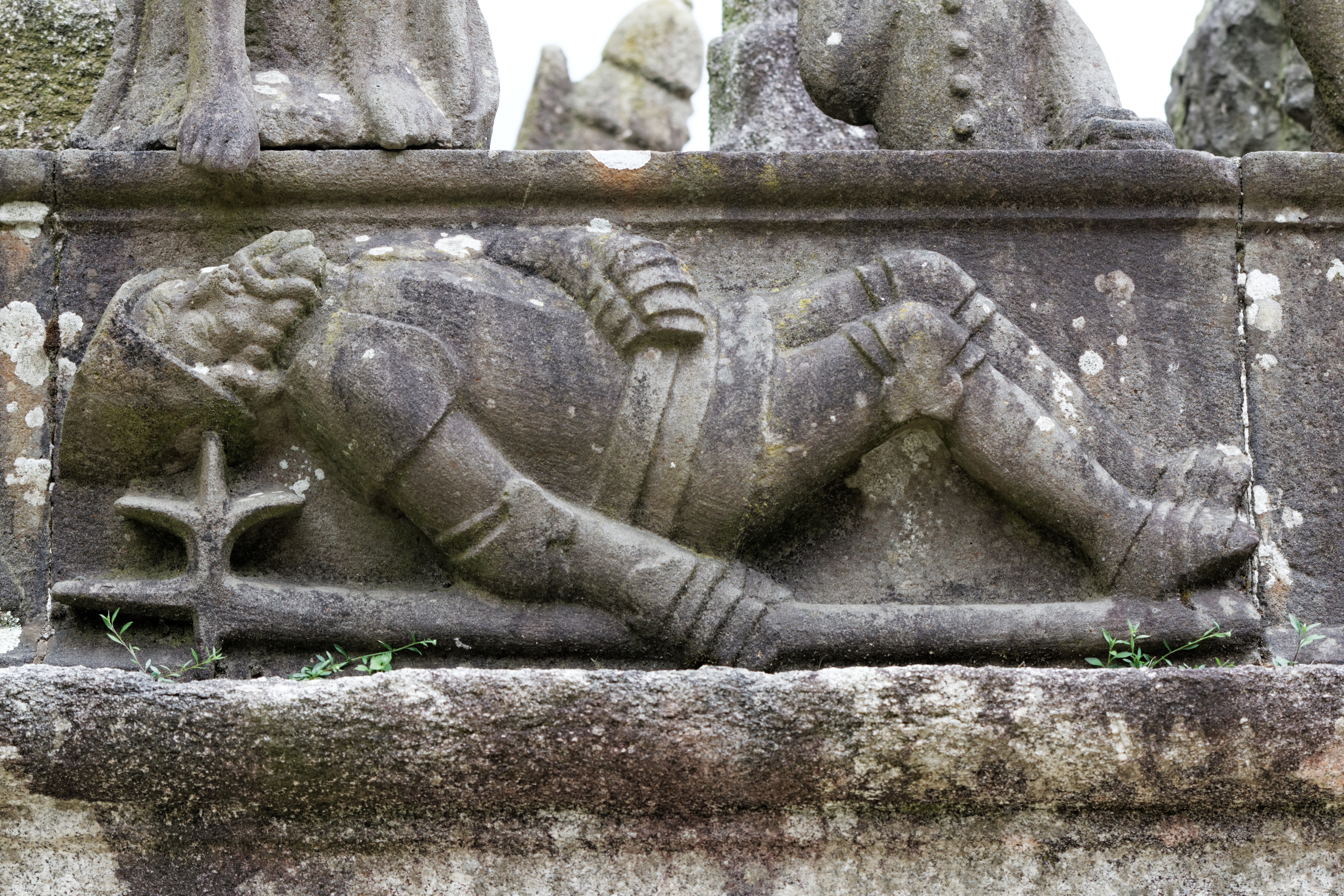
As the resurrected Jesus emerges from the tomb a soldier lies on the ground deep in sleep. Jesus' feet can be seen at the top of the photograph.

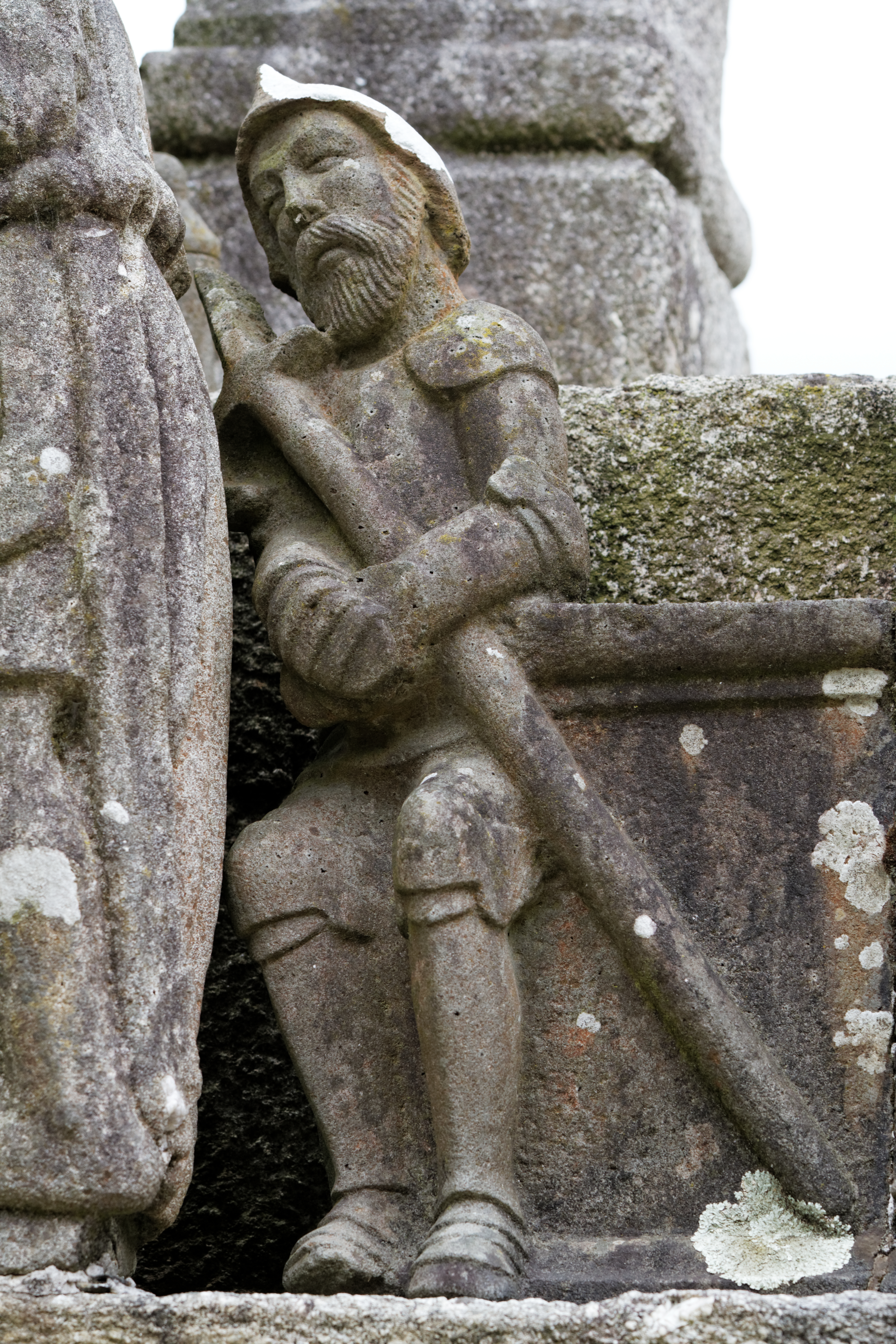
A sleeping soldier to the right of the tomb from which the resurrected Jesus has emerged

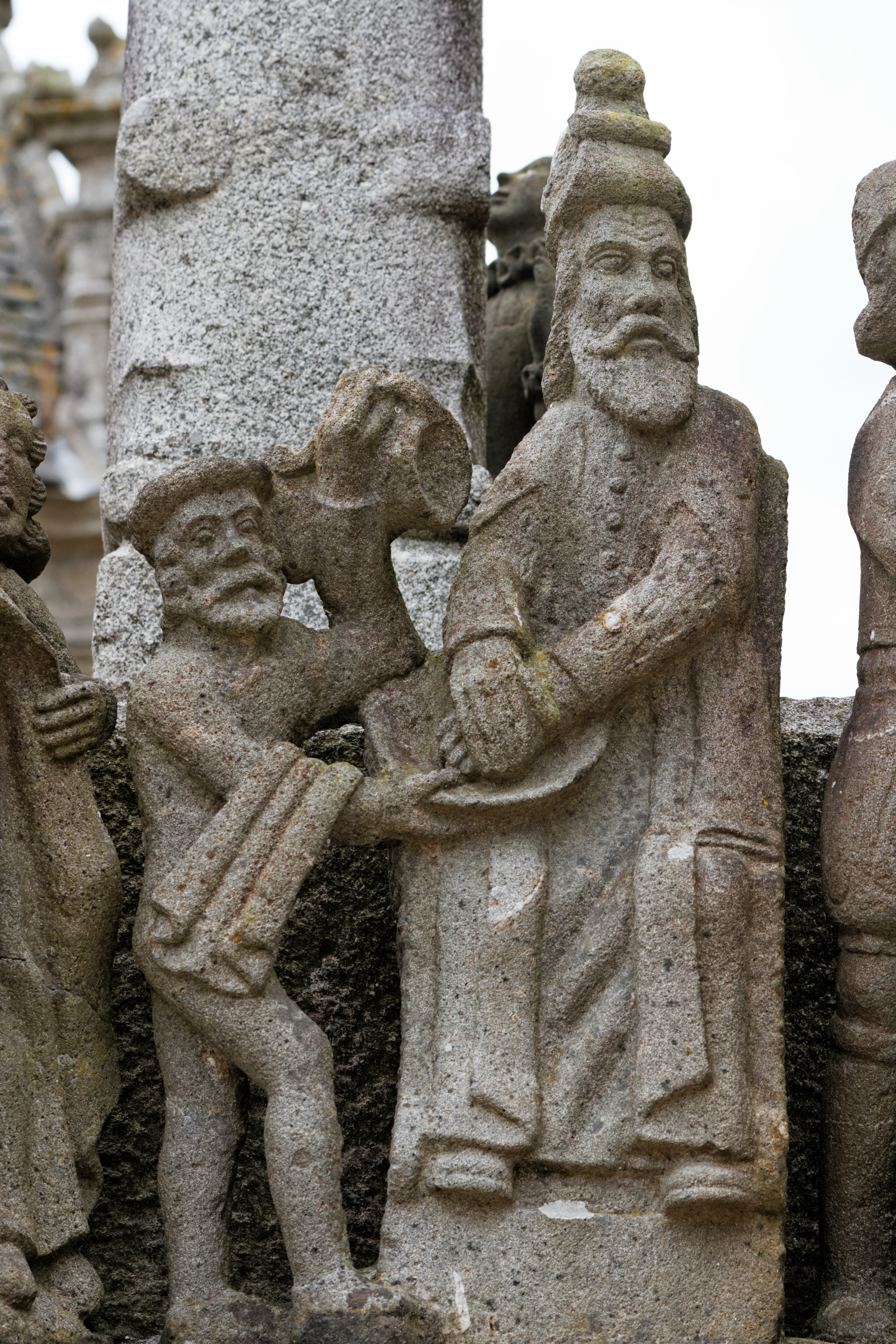
Pontius Pilate turns to wash his hands in a bowl of water held by his servant. He looks across at Jesus being led away by two soldiers

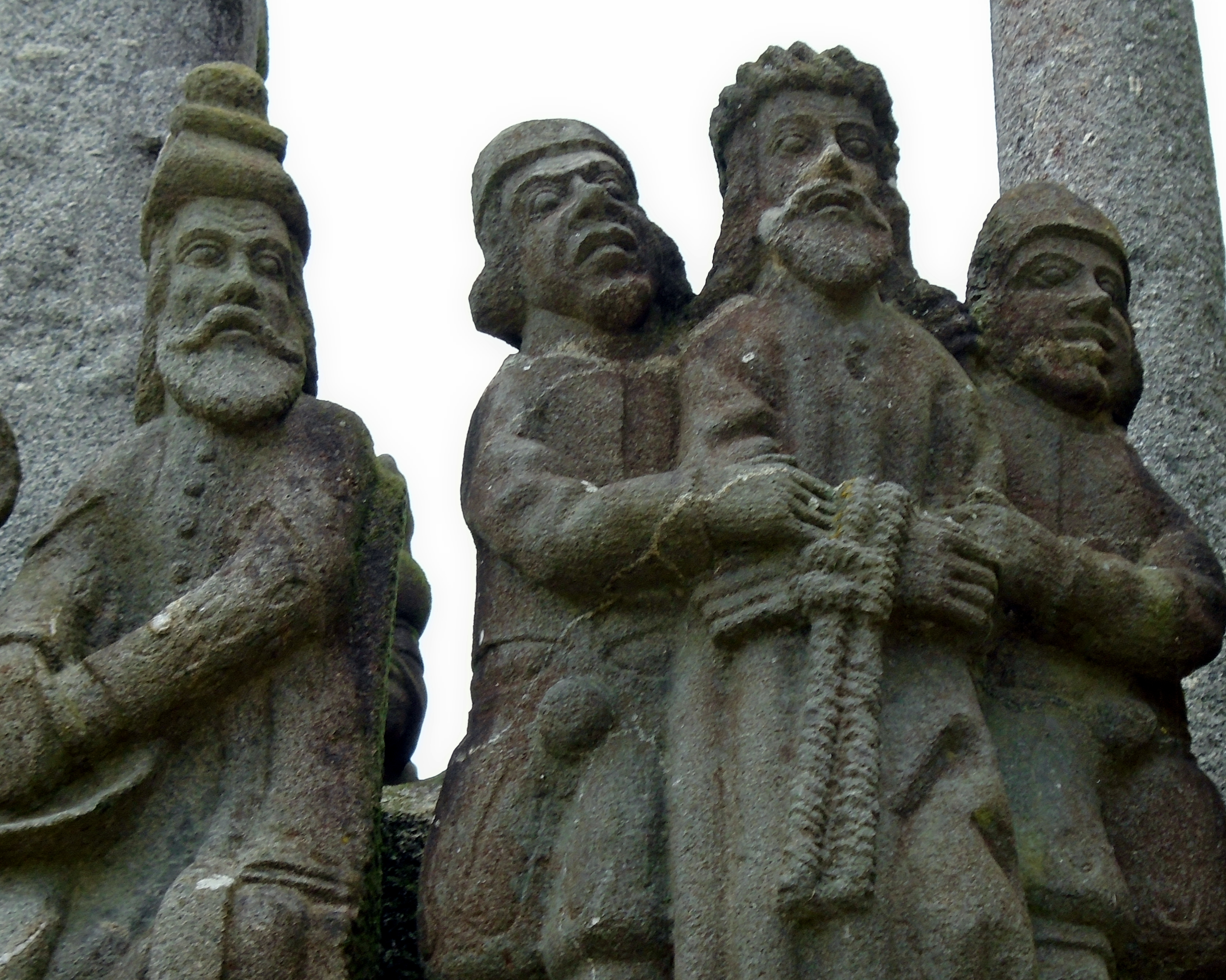
Jesus led away by two soldiers after Pontius Pilate has passed judgement

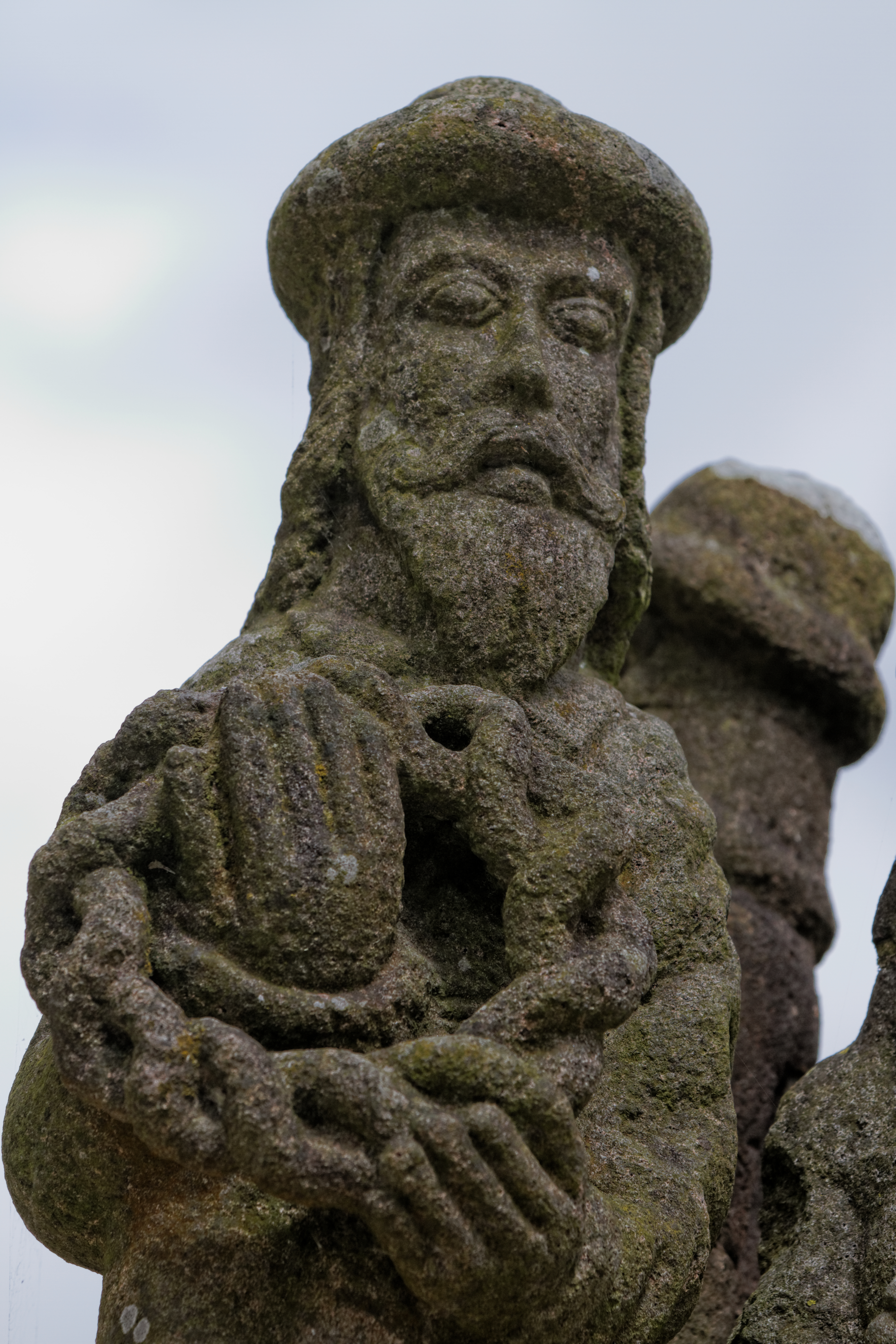
Joseph of Arimathea holds the crown of thorns at the "Mise au tombeau"

== Recommended reading ==
"Sculpteurs sur pierre en Basse-Bretagne. Les Ateliers du XVe au XVIIe Siècle" by Emmanuelle LeSeac'h. Published by Presses Universitaires de Rennes. ISBN 978-2-7535-3309-7.
