= Siegelbaum =

Siegelbaum is a Jewish surname. Notable people with the surname include:

- Kate Gordon Siegelbaum, known professionally as Kate Siegel (born 1982), American actress and screenwriter
- Lewis Siegelbaum, American historian

== See also ==
- Siegel
- Zygielbojm
