= David Segal =

David Segal may refer to:

- David R. Segal (born 1941), American sociologist
- David Segal (athlete) (born 1937), British athlete
- David Segal (politician) (born 1979), American politician in Rhode Island
- David Segal (reporter), The New York Times columnist and author of "The Haggler"
- David HaLevi Segal (c. 1586–1667), Polish rabbinical authority

== See also ==
- David Siegel (disambiguation)
