= David Siegel =

David Siegel may refer to:

- David A. Siegel (1935–2025), American businessman and founder and CEO of Westgate Resorts
- David Siegel (musician) (born 1973), American musician
- David Siegel (screenwriter), American film director and screenwriter
- Dave Siegel (One Life to Live)
- David D. Siegel (1931–2014), American law professor and legal commentator
- David Siegel (executive), CEO of Investopedia and Meetup
- David Siegel (entrepreneur) (born 1959), American entrepreneur
- David Siegel (computer scientist) (born 1961), American computer scientist and co-founder of Two Sigma
- David Siegel (ski jumper) (born 1996), German ski jumper

== See also ==
- David Segal (disambiguation)
