= Sigil (disambiguation) =

A sigil is a type of symbol used in magic.

Sigil may also refer to:

== Arts and entertainment ==
- Sigil (comics), an American comic book series published by CrossGen
- Sigil (Dungeons & Dragons), a city in the Planescape campaign setting for the Dungeons & Dragons role-playing game
- Sigil (video game mod), a 2019 Doom mod published by Romero Games
- Sigil, a 2003 album by Cauda Pavonis
- Sigil, a 2006 album by Nuru Kane

== Computing ==
- Sigil (application), a free, open-source editing software for e-books in the EPUB format
- Sigil (computer programming), a symbol affixed to a variable name, showing the variable's datatype or scope

== Organizations ==
- Sigil Games Online, an American video game developer
- Sigil Collective, a Lebanese-American art and architecture collective founded by Salim Al-Kadi, Khaled Malas, Alfred Tarazi, and Jana Traboulsi

== Seals ==
- Seal (emblem), a device for making an impression on a material and the impression thus made
- Sigillion, a type of legal document publicly affirmed with a seal

== Other uses ==
- Sigillum, a taxonomic synonym of Polygonatum, a genus of flowering plants

== See also ==
- Black Sigil: Blade of the Exiled, a 2009 role-playing video game developed by Studio Archcraft for the Nintendo DS
- The Book of Sigils, a 1995 supplement published by R. Talsorian Games for the role-playing game Castle Falkenstein
- Holiday v Sigil, an 1826 Court of Chancery case
- Sigilkore, an Internet microgenre of hip-hop
