= Binjamin W. Segel =

Binjamin Wolf Segel (1867–1931) was an author known for his monograph, Welt-Krieg, Welt-Revolution, Welt-Verschwörung, Welt-Oberregierung, 1926, consisting of a scholarly analysis and expose of the Protocols of Zion. This text was subsequently translated into English, edited, and published by Richard S. Levy.
