= Kalman Seigel =

American journalist

Kalman Seigel (1917–1998) was an American journalist, best known as editor of "Letters to the Editor" as part of his 41 years at the New York Times.

== Background ==
Kalman Seigel was born on October 17, 1917. In 1939, he graduated from City College of New York.

== Career ==
During his 41 years at the New York Times, Seigel worked assistant metropolitan editor, suburban editor, and reporter. During 1950–1, he covered the trial of government economist William Remington, accused by Elizabeth Bentley of working in her Soviet spy ring. In 1951, he wrote a series of articles on the effect of McCarthyism on academic freedom, to the last of which New York University philosophy professor Sidney Hook (among others) wrote a reply. In 1967, he began selecting letters for New York Times editorials–annually, some 50,000 letters rejected to 3,000 published – "a period that embraced the end of the Vietnam War, the rise and fall of Richard M. Nixon, and Woodstock."

Upon retiring from the Times on December 31, 1980, he wrote:

As steward of the section that is the public's most direct route to the columns of this paper, I have tried to enhance openness, welcoming a great diversity of opinion. As I leave, I am grateful to all letters writers for their faith in the liberty that Euripides tells us comes only when "freeborn men speak free."

He taught journalism at Brooklyn College, Long Island University, and his alma mater City College.

== Personal life and death ==
Seigel married Lillian Seigel; they had two daughters.

Seigel had a brother, Max Seigel, who also wrote for the Times.

In 1971, Seigel served as president of the Society of Silurians.

Kalman Seigel died age 80 on May 13, 1998, of pancreatic cancer at the New York University Medical Center.

== Awards ==
- 1952: George Polk Award for series on dangers of McCarthyism to academic freedom

== Works ==
Seigel wrote two books with Lawrence Feigenbaum:

- This Is a Newspaper (1965)
- Israel: Crossroads of Conflict (1968)

Seigel also edited:

- Talking Back to the New York Times (1972)
