= Yehiel Segal =

Israeli painter

Yehiel Segal (Hebrew: יחיאל סגל; 1924 –1996) was an Israeli painter. He is mostly known for his watercolours and sketches.

== Biography ==
Segal was born in Kishinev, and immigrated to Israel in 1932. He studied at the Avni Institute with Yehezkel Streichman and Avigdor Steimatzky. For 25 years, he worked at the water department of Rehovot.
