= Chagall (restaurant) =

Coordinates: 52°5′17.84″N 4°22′55.15″E

Chagali
- Interactive map of Chagali

Restaurant information
- Established: before 1979
- Closed: before 1993
- Food type: French
- Rating: Michelin Guide
- Location: Weigelia 20, Leidschendam, 2262 AB, Netherlands

Restaurant Chagali is a defunct restaurant in Leidschendam, Netherlands. It was a fine dining restaurant that was awarded one Michelin star in 1983 and retained that rating until 1991.

The restaurant closed down before 1993, as the Michelin Guide 1993 mentioned restaurant Green Park at that address.

== See also ==
- List of Michelin starred restaurants in the Netherlands
