= Chagall (disambiguation) =

Marc Chagall (1887–1985) was a Belarusian-Jewish-French artist.

Chagall may also refer to:

- Chagall (film), 1963 short documentary film
- Chagall (restaurant), restaurant in Leidschendam, Netherlands
- 2981 Chagall, main belt asteroid

== Other people with the surname ==
- Bella Rosenfeld Chagall (1895–1944), writer and wife of Marc
- Rachel Chagall (born 1952), American actress
- Nic Chagall (born 1972), German music producer

== See also ==
- Chagal or Chakal, village in Iran
- Chagall Guevara, American rock band
