= Chakal, Iran =

Chakal چاكل
- Village
- Location within Iran
- Coordinates: 36°43′47″N 50°23′19″E
- Country: Iran
- Province: Gilan
- County: Rudsar
- Bakhsh: Rahimabad
- Rural District: Siyarastaq Yeylaq

Population (2006)
  - Total: 16
- Time zone: UTC+3:30 (IRST)
  - Summer (DST): UTC+4:30 (IRDT)

Chakal (Persian: چاكل, also Romanized as Chākal; also known as Chāgal) is a village in Siyarastaq Yeylaq Rural District, Rahimabad District, Rudsar County, Gilan Province, Iran. At the 2006 census, its population was 16, in 11 families.
