= Saint-Ségal =

Saint-Ségal Sant-Segal
- Commune
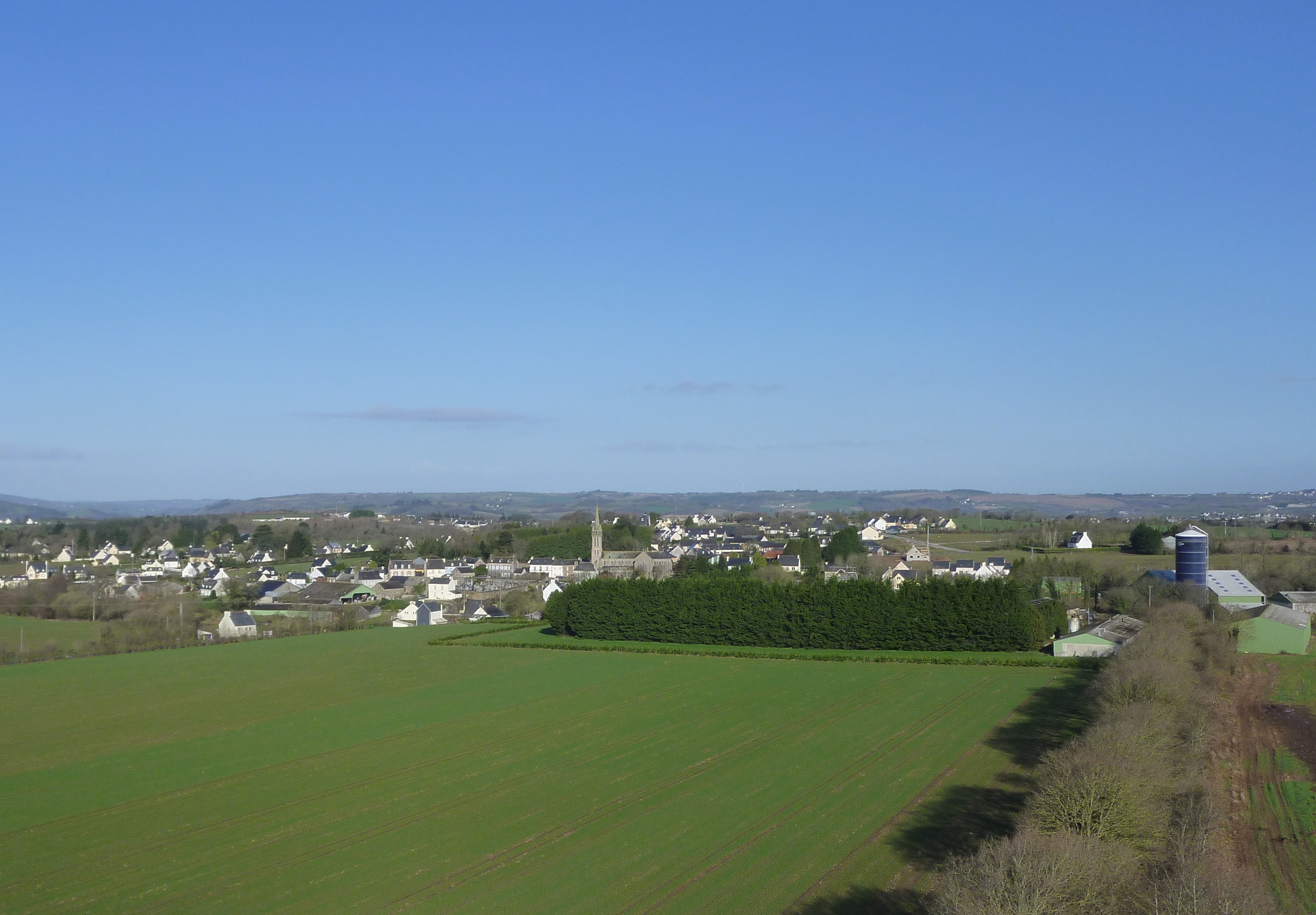
- A general view of Saint-Ségal

- Coat of arms
- Location of Saint-Ségal
- Location within France Location within Brittany
- Coordinates: 48°14′30″N 4°03′53″W
- Country: France
- Region: Brittany
- Department: Finistère
- Arrondissement: Châteaulin
- Canton: Pont-de-Buis-lès-Quimerch
- Intercommunality: Pleyben-Châteaulin-Porzay

Government
  - Mayor (2020–2026): Frederic Drelon
- Area^{1}: 16.20 km^{2} (6.25 sq mi)
- Highest elevation: 140 m (460 ft)
- Lowest elevation: 2 m (6.6 ft)
- Population (2023): 1,182
  - Density: 72.96/km^{2} (189.0/sq mi)
- Time zone: UTC+01:00 (CET)
  - Summer (DST): UTC+02:00 (CEST)
- INSEE/Postal code: 29263 /29590
- ^{1} French Land Register data, which excludes lakes, ponds, glaciers > 1 km^{2} (0.386 sq mi or 247 acres) and river estuaries.

Saint-Ségal (French pronunciation: [sɛ̃ seɡal]; Breton: Sant-Segal) is a commune in the Finistère department of Brittany in north-western France.

== Geography ==
=== Climate ===
Saint-Ségal has an oceanic climate (Köppen climate classification Cfb). The average annual temperature in Saint-Ségal is 11.6 °C (52.9 °F). The average annual rainfall is 1,122.9 mm (44.21 in) with January as the wettest month. The temperatures are highest on average in August, at around 17.5 °C (63.5 °F), and lowest in January, at around 6.6 °C (43.9 °F). The highest temperature ever recorded in Saint-Ségal was 37.7 °C (99.9 °F) on 3 August 1990; the coldest temperature ever recorded was −12.4 °C (9.7 °F) on 9 February 1991.

Climate data for Saint-Ségal (1981–2010 averages, extremes 1985−present)
Month	Jan	Feb	Mar	Apr	May	Jun	Jul	Aug	Sep	Oct	Nov	Dec	Year
Record high °C (°F)	16.3 (61.3)	20.5 (68.9)	23.6 (74.5)	27.9 (82.2)	30.6 (87.1)	33.8 (92.8)	35.6 (96.1)	37.7 (99.9)	31.1 (88.0)	28.6 (83.5)	20.2 (68.4)	18.0 (64.4)	37.7 (99.9)
Mean daily maximum °C (°F)	9.6 (49.3)	10.2 (50.4)	12.4 (54.3)	14.4 (57.9)	18.2 (64.8)	20.8 (69.4)	22.5 (72.5)	22.8 (73.0)	20.5 (68.9)	16.7 (62.1)	12.5 (54.5)	10.0 (50.0)	15.9 (60.6)
Daily mean °C (°F)	6.6 (43.9)	6.8 (44.2)	8.5 (47.3)	9.8 (49.6)	13.2 (55.8)	15.6 (60.1)	17.4 (63.3)	17.5 (63.5)	15.3 (59.5)	12.7 (54.9)	9.0 (48.2)	6.9 (44.4)	11.6 (52.9)
Mean daily minimum °C (°F)	3.7 (38.7)	3.4 (38.1)	4.5 (40.1)	5.2 (41.4)	8.2 (46.8)	10.4 (50.7)	12.4 (54.3)	12.3 (54.1)	10.2 (50.4)	8.7 (47.7)	5.5 (41.9)	3.9 (39.0)	7.4 (45.3)
Record low °C (°F)	−10.4 (13.3)	−12.4 (9.7)	−6.6 (20.1)	−3.6 (25.5)	−2.1 (28.2)	0.9 (33.6)	4.5 (40.1)	2.8 (37.0)	−0.4 (31.3)	−4.5 (23.9)	−6.1 (21.0)	−7.3 (18.9)	−12.4 (9.7)
Average precipitation mm (inches)	132.6 (5.22)	105.9 (4.17)	84.6 (3.33)	86.3 (3.40)	71.8 (2.83)	59.0 (2.32)	63.7 (2.51)	63.0 (2.48)	79.9 (3.15)	122.6 (4.83)	128.1 (5.04)	125.4 (4.94)	1,122.9 (44.21)
Average precipitation days (≥ 1.0 mm)	16.0	14.1	13.3	13.3	10.2	8.5	10.0	9.9	10.2	14.3	16.6	15.3	151.5
Source: Meteociel

== Population ==
Inhabitants of Saint-Ségal are called in French Saint-Ségalais.

== See also ==
- Communes of the Finistère department
- Parc naturel régional d'Armorique
- List of the works of the Maître de Thégonnec
