= Sigal (disambiguation) =

Sigal is a given name and a surname.

Sigal may also refer to:

- Sigal Music Museum, South Carolina, U.S.
- Sigal, Sakastan, Afghanistan
- SIGAL (insurance company), Albania

== See also ==
- Sigala (disambiguation)
