= Sigalas =

Sigalas may refer to:

- Château Sigalas-Rabaud or Château Rabaud-Sigalas, French wine producer
- Étienne-Sylvestre Drouilhet de Sigalas (1778–1848), French politician
- Giorgos Sigalas (born 1961), Greek basketball player
- de Sigalas family, owners of Château Sigalas-Rabaud and of the castle Château de Bazoches

== See also ==
- Sigala (disambiguation)
