= Sébastien Le Prestre, Marquis of Vauban =

French Royal Army officer (1633–1707)

Sébastien Le Prestre
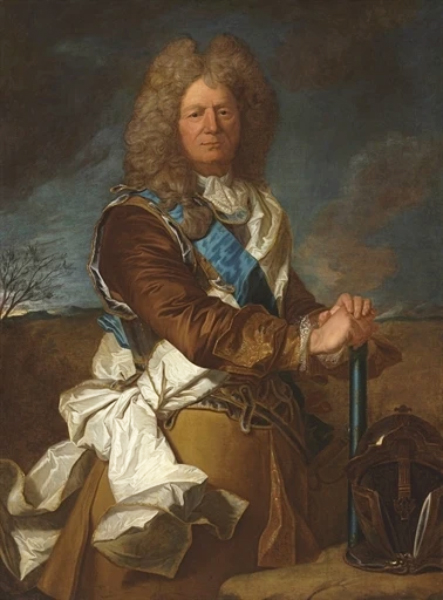
- Maréchal Vauban, by Hyacinthe Rigaud, 17th century

Commissaire général des fortifications (Note: Commissioner General of Fortifications)
- In office 1678–1703

Personal details
- Born: (baptised) 15 May 1633 Saint-Léger-Vauban, Burgundy, France
- Died: 30 March 1707 (aged 73) Paris, France
- Resting place: Bazoches, later reburied in Les Invalides
- Awards: Order of the Holy Spirit; Order of Saint Louis; Honorary Member French Academy of Sciences

Military service
- Allegiance: France
- Years of service: 1651–1703
- Rank: Maréchal de France, 1703
- Battles/wars: Franco-Spanish War; War of Devolution; Siege of Lille (1667); Franco-Dutch War; Siege of Maastricht (1673); War of the Reunions; Siege of Luxembourg (1684); Nine Years' War; Siege of Namur (1692); Battle of Camaret (1694); Siege of Ath (1697); War of the Spanish Succession; Siege of Hulst (1702)

Sébastien Le Prestre, Marquis of Vauban, commonly known as Vauban (French: [sebastjɛ̃ lə pʁɛstʁ də vobɑ̃]; baptised 15 May 1633 – 30 March 1707), was a French Royal Army officer who served under Louis XIV. One of the most important military engineers in European history, his defensive principles remained in use for nearly 100 years after his death, while aspects of his offensive tactics were employed into the 20th century.

Viewing civilian infrastructure as closely connected to military effectiveness, Vauban upgraded many of France's major ports, as well as new projects like the Bruche Canal. He founded the Corps royal des ingénieurs militaires, whose curriculum was based on his own principles of design, strategy and training.

His economic tract, La Dîme royale, used statistics in support of his arguments, making it a precursor of modern economics. Later destroyed by royal decree, it contained radical proposals for a more even distribution of the tax burden. His application of rational and scientific methods to solving engineering and social issues anticipated an approach common in the Age of Enlightenment.

Perhaps the most enduring aspect of Vauban's legacy was his view of France as a geographical entity. His advocacy of giving up territory for a more coherent and defensible border was unusual for the period; the boundaries of the French state he proposed in the north and east have changed very little since.

== Personal details ==
Sébastien le Prestre de Vauban was born in 1633 (probably May) in Saint-Léger-de-Foucheret, renamed Saint-Léger-Vauban in 1867, in what is now the Bourgogne-Franche-Comté region. His parents, Urbain Le Prestre (c. 1602–1652) and Edmée de Cormignolle (died c. 1651), were members of the minor nobility from Vauban in Bazoches.

In 1570, his grandfather, Jacques Le Prestre, acquired Château de Bazoches when he married Françoise de la Perrière, an illegitimate daughter of the Comte de Bazoches, who died intestate. The 30-year legal battle by the Le Prestre family to retain the property proved financially ruinous, forcing Urbain to become a forestry worker. He also designed gardens for the local gentry, including the owners of the Château de Ruère, where Vauban spent his early years.

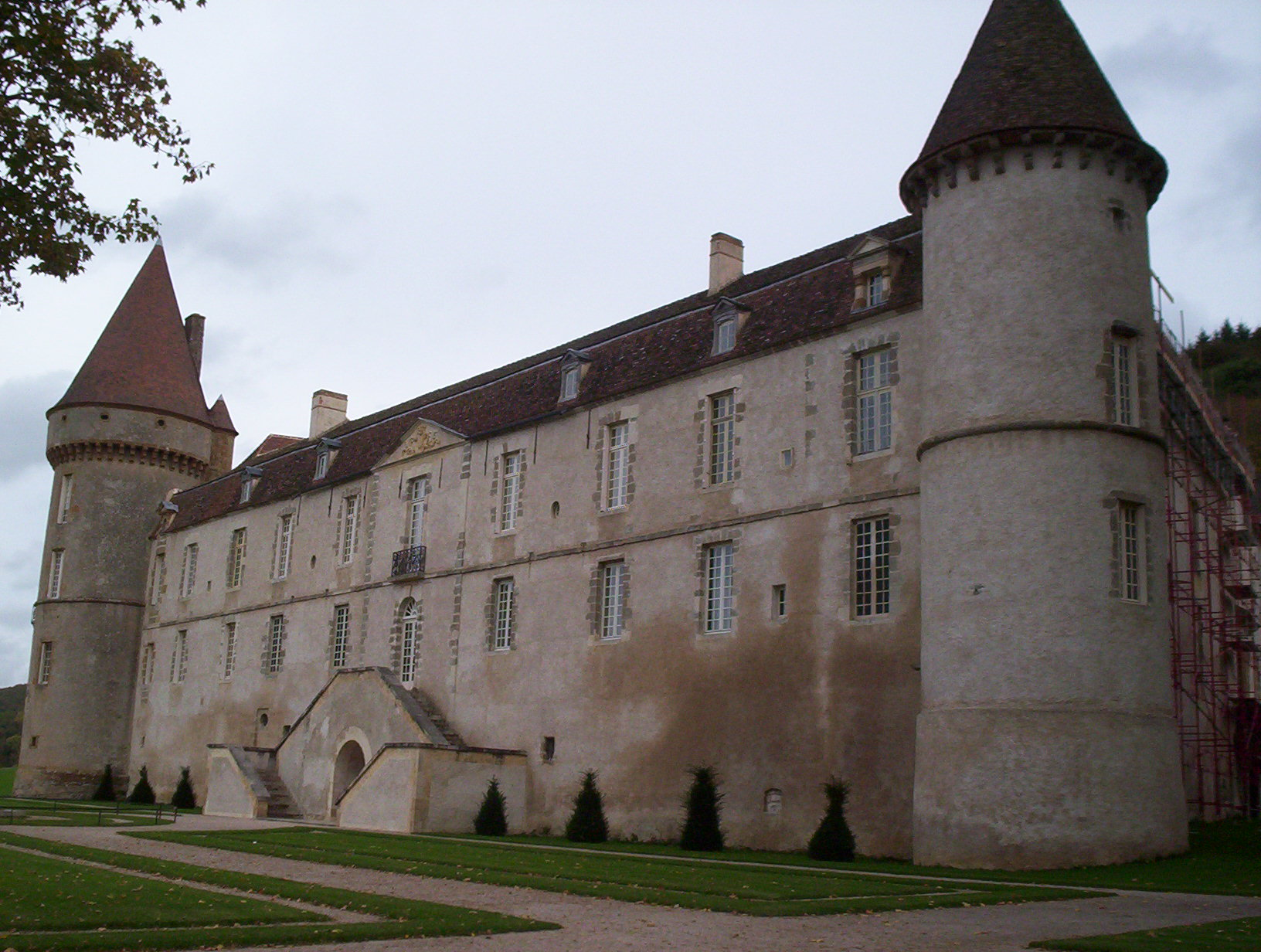
Château de Bazoches, purchased by Vauban in 1675

Vauban had only one sibling, a sister Charlotte (1638–1645?) who died young, but his cousin, Paul le Prestre (c. 1630 – 1703), was an army officer who later supervised construction of Les Invalides. Three of Paul's sons served in the army, two of whom were killed in action in 1676 and 1677. The third, Antoine (1654–1731), became Vauban's assistant and later a lieutenant-general; in 1710, he was appointed Governor of Béthune for life, while he inherited Vauban's titles and the bulk of his lands.

Like many contemporaries, Vauban's family was deeply affected by the Huguenot rebellions of the 1620s, the Franco-Spanish War (1635–1659), and 1648 to 1653 Fronde. His maternal grandfather was a Catholic who married a Protestant from La Rochelle, and served Huguenot leader Admiral Coligny, while two of his uncles died in the war with Spain.

== Career ==
In 1643, at the age of ten, Vauban was sent to the Carmelite college in Semur-en-Auxois, where he was taught the basics of mathematics, science and geometry. This was relevant, not only for his future career but also his father's work, since the design of neo-classical gardens and fortifications both concerned managing space. These skills were commonly combined at the time; the gardens at Blenheim Palace were for instance laid out by John Armstrong (1674–1742), Marlborough's chief military engineer.

In 1650, Vauban joined the household of his local magnate, Louis, Grand Condé, where he met de Montal; a close neighbour from Nièvre, the two were colleagues for many years, and often worked together. During the 1650–1653 Fronde des nobles, Condé was arrested by the Regency Council, led by Louis XIV's mother Anne of Austria and Cardinal Mazarin. After being released in 1652, he and his supporters, among them Vauban and de Montal, went into exile in the Spanish Netherlands and allied with the Spanish. At the time, it was common for young men to follow the lead of local powerful magnates which would explain the future eagerness of the crown to offer him service in the royal army. Vauban first saw action at Clermont-en-Argonne and was noticed by Condé as a diligent and energetic soldier that took a keen interest in the practices of siege warfare even at such a young age and he was sometimes entrusted with directing the improvement of local fortifications.

In early 1653, when Vauban worked on the defences of Sainte-Menehould, one of Condé's principal possessions, he was captured by a Royalist patrol and switched sides, serving in the force led by Louis Nicolas de Clerville that took Sainte-Menehould in November 1653. Clerville, later appointed Commissaire général des fortifications, employed him on siege operations and building fortifications. In 1655, Vauban was appointed Ingénieur du Roi or Royal Engineer, and by the time the war with Spain ended in 1659, he was widely known as a talented engineer of energy and courage; during his career, he was wounded eight times.

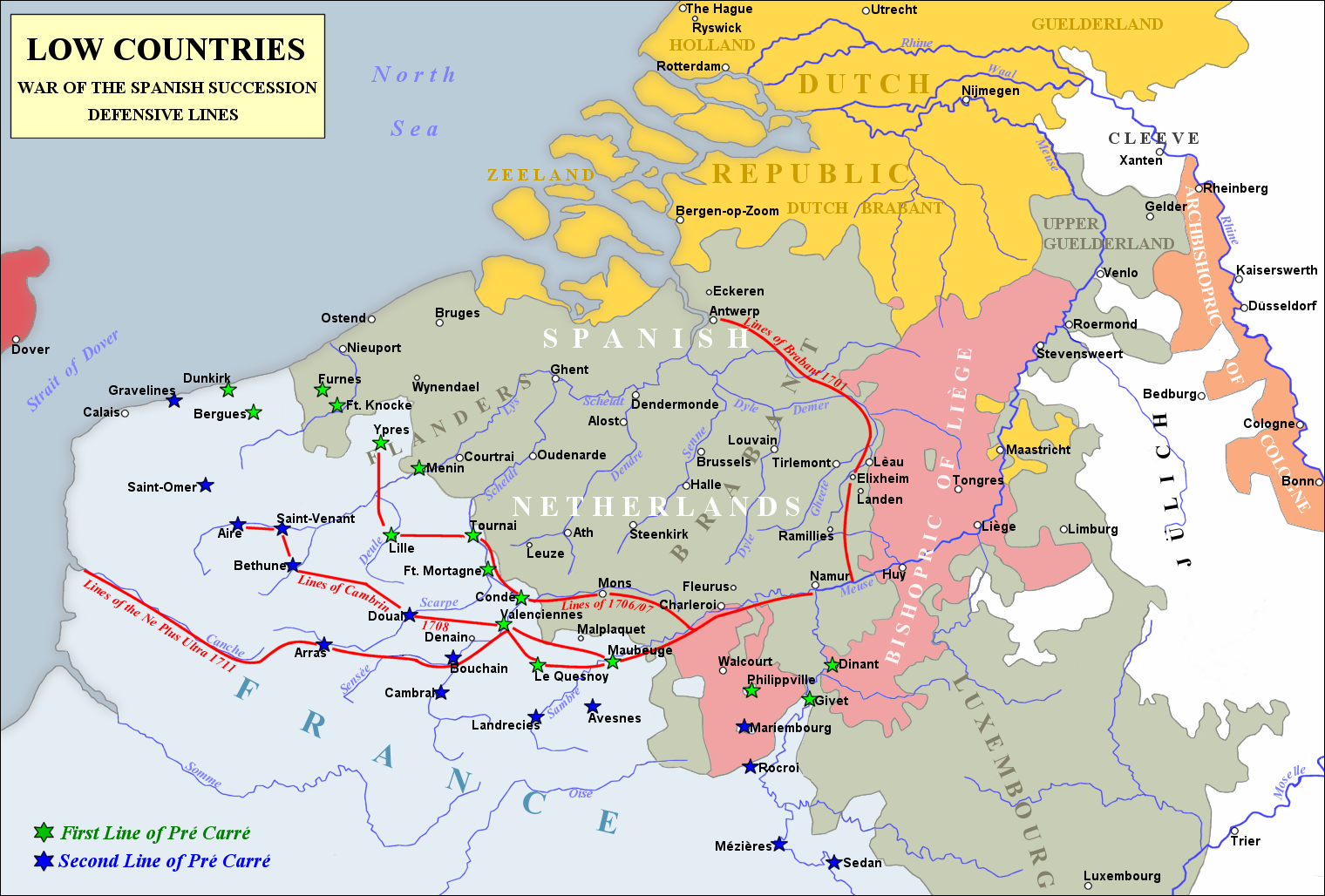
Vauban's Pré carré or 'duelling zone' on France's northern border, defended by a line of fortresses known as the Ceinture de fer (marked in red and green)

Under the terms of the Treaty of the Pyrenees, Spain ceded much of French Flanders, and Vauban was put in charge of fortifying newly acquired towns such as Dunkirk. This pattern of French territorial gains, followed by fortification of new strongpoints, was followed in the 1667–1668 War of Devolution, 1672–1678 Franco-Dutch War and 1683–1684 War of the Reunions.

The first fortification Vauban designed was the 1673 siege of Maastricht, although he was subordinate to Louis, who ranked as the senior officer present, and thus took credit for its capture. Vauban was rewarded with a large sum of money, which he used to purchase the Château de Bazouches from his cousin in 1675.

After 1673, French strategy in Flanders was based on a memorandum from Vauban to Louvois, Minister of War, setting out a proposed line of fortresses known as the Ceinture de fer, or iron belt (see Map). He was made Maréchal de camp in 1676, and succeeded Clerville as Commissaire general des fortifications in 1677.

During the Nine Years' War, Vauban inflicted a stinging defeat on an Anglo-Dutch invasion force at Camaret, supervised the capture of Namur in 1692, the major French achievement of the war, while the 1697 siege of Ath is often considered his offensive masterpiece. He was rewarded with money and rank: he was made Comte de Vauban, a member of the Order of the Holy Spirit and Order of Saint Louis, and an Honorary Member of the French Academy of Sciences.

The numbers needed to conduct a siege, and prevent interference from opponents meant armies of the Nine Years' War often exceeded 100,000 men, sizes unsustainable for pre-industrial societies. This limitation prompted a change in tactics; Marlborough argued that winning one battle was more beneficial than taking 12 fortresses. The armies of the War of the Spanish Succession averaged around 35,000, and siege warfare was superseded by a greater emphasis on mobility.

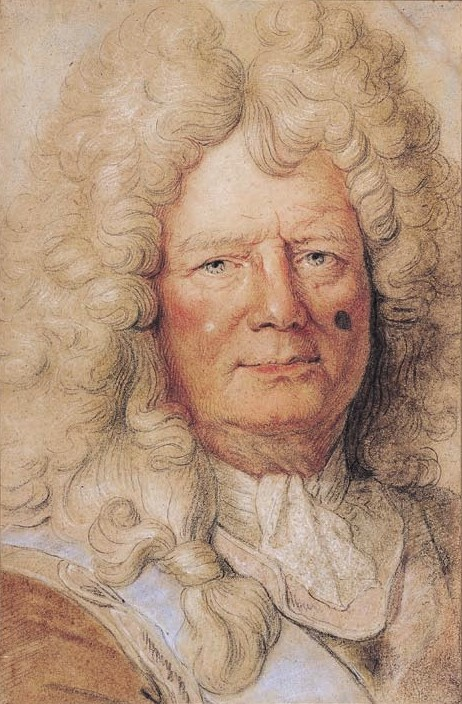
Vauban, painted near the end of his life in 1703

In 1702 Vauban was ordered by Louis to attack Hulst. He had however insufficient means available to him and so the Siege of Hulst remains the only siege in which Vauban was not successful as he was forced to retreat. The next year, Vauban directed his final siege, capturing Alt-Brisach and was promoted to Maréchal de France, marking the end of his military career, although the Ceinture de fer proved its worth after the French defeat at Ramillies in 1706. Under pressure from superior forces on multiple fronts, France's northern border remained largely intact despite repeated efforts to break it. Capturing Lille cost the Allies 12,000 casualties and most of the 1708 campaigning season; the lack of progress between 1706 and 1712 enabled Louis to negotiate an acceptable peace at Utrecht in 1713, as opposed to the humiliating terms presented in 1707.

With more leisure time, Vauban developed a broader view of his role. His fortifications were designed for mutual support, so they required connecting roads, bridges and canals; garrisons needed to be fed, so he prepared maps showing the location of forges, forests and farms. Since these had to be paid for, he developed an interest in tax policy, and in 1707 published La Dîme royale, documenting the economic misery of the lower classes. His solution was a flat 10% tax on all agricultural and industrial output, and eliminating the exemptions which meant most of the nobility and clergy paid nothing. Although his work was confiscated and destroyed by royal decree, the use of statistics to support his arguments "... establishes him as a founder of modern economics, and precursor of the Enlightenment's socially concerned intellectuals."

Estimates of the number of fortifications Vauban supervised or designed vary widely, from around 60 to over 300, depending on how projects are counted; modern scholarship suggests a figure closer to 160. (Note: Including Antibes (Fort Carré), Arras, Auxonne, Barraux, Bayonne, Belfort, Bergues, Citadel of Besançon, Bitche, Blaye, Briançon, Bouillon, Calais, Cambrai, Colmars-les-Alpes, Collioure, Douai, Entrevaux, Givet, Gravelines, Hendaye, Huningue, Joux, Kehl, Landau, Le Palais (Belle-Île), La Rochelle, Le Quesnoy, Lille, Lusignan, Le Perthus (Fort de Bellegarde), Luxembourg City, Maastricht, Maubeuge, Metz, Mont-Dauphin, Mont-Louis, Montmédy, Namur, Neuf-Brisach, Perpignan, Plouezoc'h (in French) (Château du Taureau), Rocroi, Saarlouis, Saint-Jean-Pied-de-Port, Saint-Omer, Sedan, Strasbourg, Toul, Valenciennes, Verdun, Villefranche-de-Conflent (town and Fort Liberia), and Ypres. He directed the building of 37 new fortresses, and fortified military harbours, including Ambleteuse, Brest, Dunkerque, Freiburg im Breisgau, Lille (Citadel of Lille), Rochefort, Saint-Jean-de-Luz (Fort Socoa), Saint-Martin-de-Ré, Toulon, Wimereux, Le Portel, and Cézembre) By his own estimate, he supervised more than 40 sieges from 1653 to 1697.

== Personal life and death ==
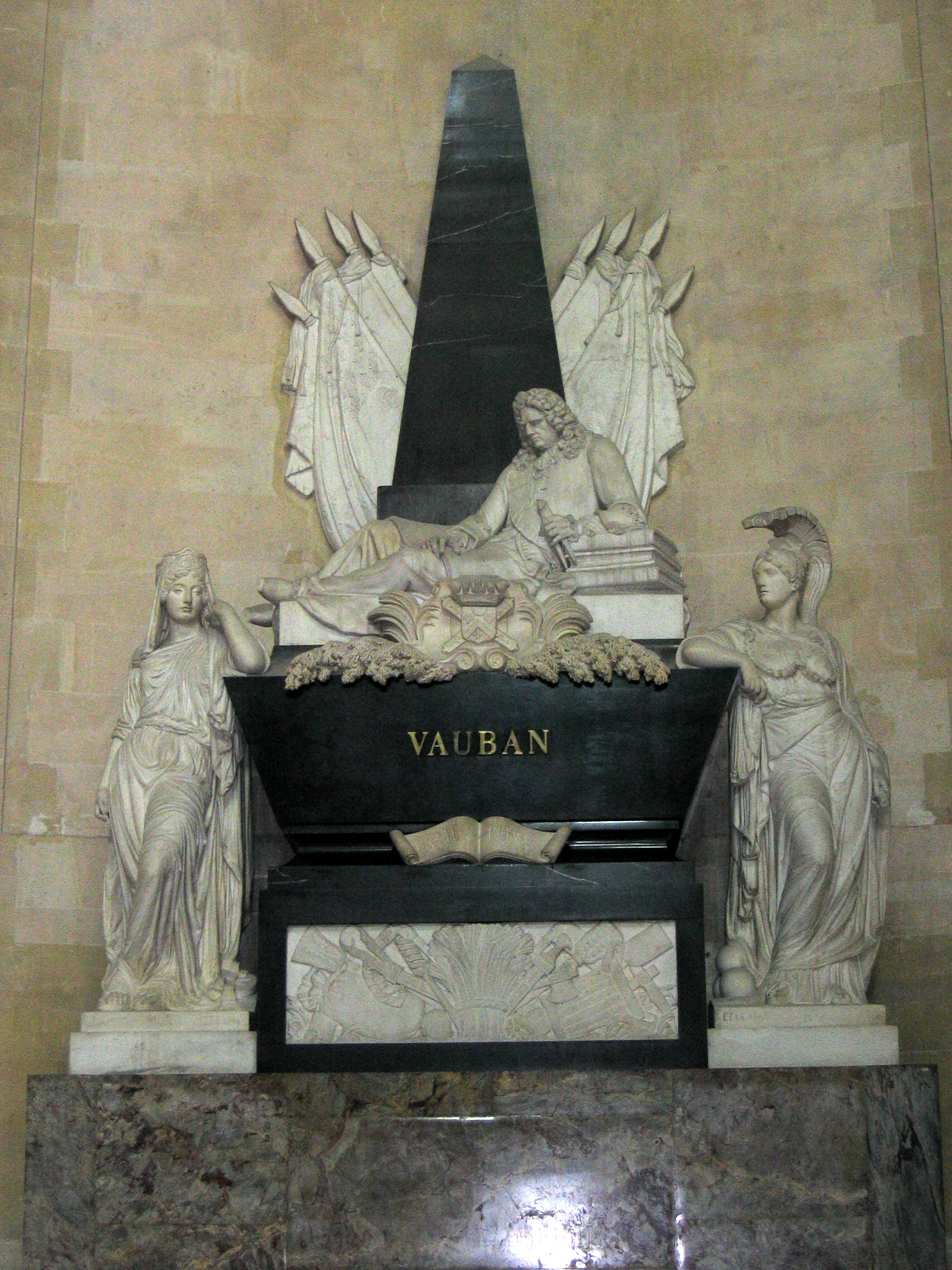
Vauban's mausoleum in Les Invalides

In 1660, Vauban married Jeanne d'Aunay d'Epiry (ca 1640–1705); they had two daughters, Charlotte (1661–1709) and Jeanne Françoise (1678–1713), as well as a short-lived infant son. He also had a long-term relationship with Marie-Antoinette de Puy-Montbrun, daughter of an exiled Huguenot officer, usually referred to as 'Mademoiselle de Villefranche.'

Vauban died in Paris on 30 March 1707; he was buried near his home in Bazoches. His grave was destroyed during the French Revolution. In 1808, Napoleon I ordered his heart reburied in Les Invalides, the resting place of many of France's most famous soldiers.

== Doctrines and legacy ==
=== Offensive doctrines; siege warfare ===
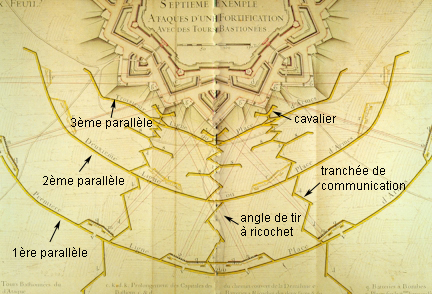
The 'siege parallel'; three parallel trenches, linked by communication lines. The first trench is out of range of the defenders and can withstand an assault from the rear, the third brings the assault troops to the foot of the glacis; redoubts protect the ends of each.

While his modern fame rests on the fortifications he built, Vauban's greatest innovations were in offensive operations, an approach he summarised as 'More powder, less blood.' Initially reliant on existing concepts, he later adapted these on lines set out in his memorandum of March 1672, Mémoire pour servir à l'instruction dans la conduite des sièges.

In this period, sieges became the dominant form of warfare; during the 1672–1678 Franco-Dutch War, three battles were fought in the Spanish Netherlands, of which only Seneffe was unrelated to a siege. Their importance was heightened by Louis XIV, who viewed them as low-risk opportunities for demonstrating his military skill and increasing his prestige; he was present at 20 of those conducted by Vauban.

The 'siege parallel' had been in development since the mid-16th century but Vauban brought the idea to practical fulfilment at Maastricht in 1673. Three parallel trenches were dug in front of the walls, the earth thus excavated being used to create embankments screening the attackers from defensive fire, while bringing them as close to the assault point as possible (see diagram). Artillery was moved into the trenches, allowing them to target the base of the walls at close range, with the defenders unable to depress their own guns enough to counter this; once a breach had been made, it was then stormed. This approach was used in offensive operations well into the 20th century.

However, Vauban adapted his approach to the situation, and did not use the siege parallel again until Valenciennes in 1677. Always willing to challenge accepted norms, at Valenciennes, he proposed assaulting the breach during the day, rather than at night as was normal practice. He argued this would reduce casualties by surprising the defenders, and allow better co-ordination among the assault force; he was supported by Louis, and the attack proved successful.

Vauban made several innovations in the use of siege artillery, including ricochet firing, and concentrating on specific parts of the fortifications, rather than targeting multiple targets. His Dutch rival Menno van Coehoorn employed a similar approach. While the 'Van Coehoorn method' sought to overwhelm defences with massive firepower, such as the Grand Battery of 200 guns at Namur in 1695, Vauban preferred a more gradual approach. Both had their supporters; Vauban argued his was less costly in terms of casualties, but it took more time, an important consideration in an age when far more soldiers died from disease than in combat.

=== Defensive doctrines; fortifications ===
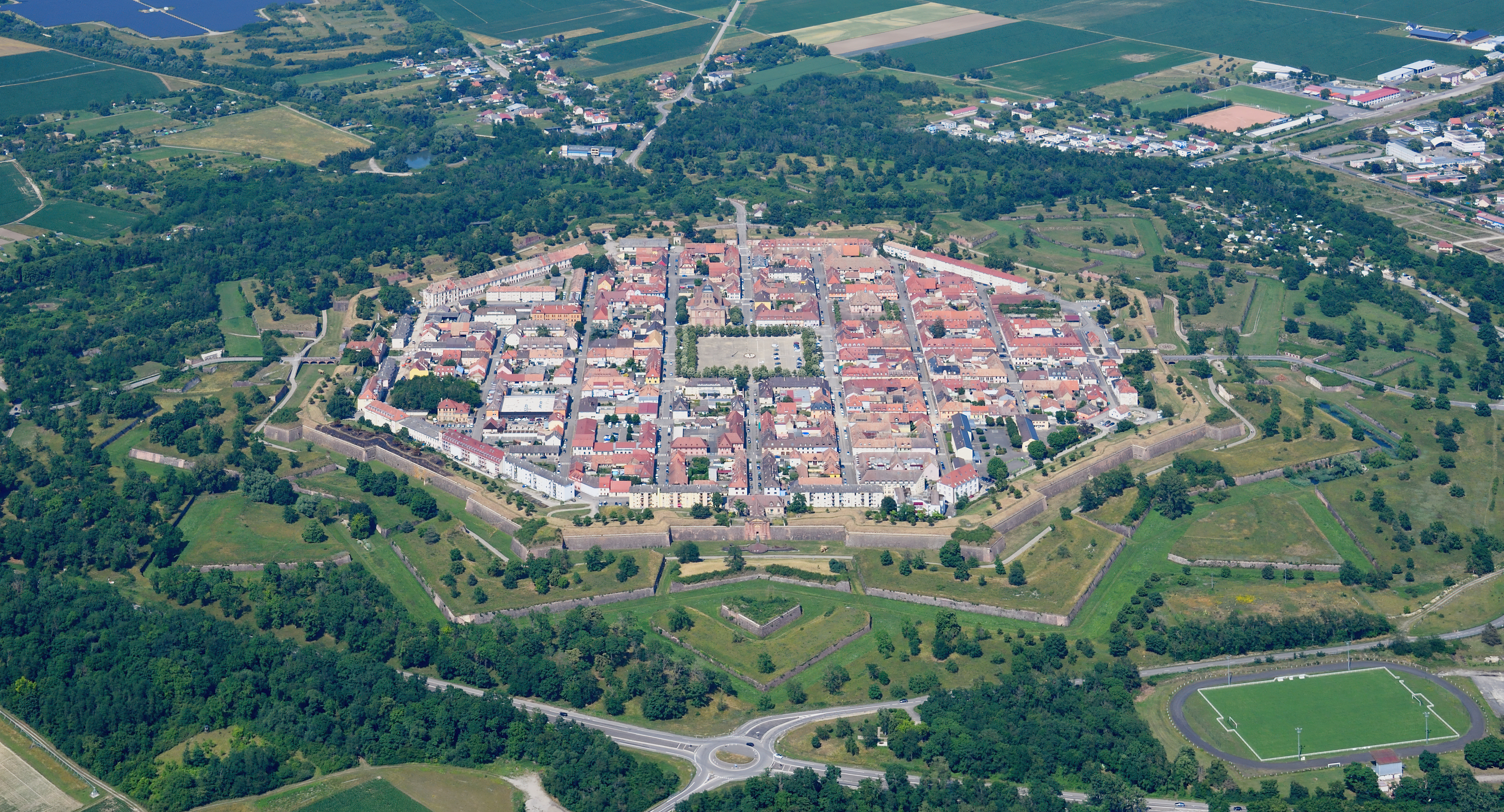
Neuf-Brisach, the final fortress designed by Vauban; note how the houses support and reinforce the outer defensive walls

It was accepted even the strongest fortifications would fall, given time; the process was so well understood by the 1690s, betting on the length of a siege became a popular craze. As few states could afford large standing armies, defenders needed time to mobilise; to provide this, fortresses were designed to absorb the attackers' energies, similar to the use of crumple zones in modern cars. The French defence of Namur in 1695 showed "how one could effectively win a campaign, by losing a fortress, but exhausting the besiegers."

As with the siege parallel, the strength of Vauban's defensive designs was his ability to synthesise and adapt the work of others to create a more powerful whole. His first works used the 'star-shape' or bastion fort design, also known as the trace Italienne, based on the designs of Antoine de Ville (1596–1656) and Blaise Pagan (1603–1665). His subsequent 'systems' strengthened their internal works with the addition of casemated shoulders and flanks.

The principles of Vauban's 'second system' were set out in the 1683 work Le Directeur-Général des fortifications, and used at Landau and Mont-Royal, near Traben-Trarbach; both were advanced positions, intended as stepping-off points for French offensives into the Rhineland. Located 200 metres (660 ft) above the Moselle, Mont-Royal had main walls 30 metres (98 ft) high, 3 kilometres (1.9 mi) long and space for 12,000 troops; this enormously expensive work was demolished when the French withdrew after the 1697 Treaty of Ryswick, and only the foundations remain today. Fort-Louis was another new construction, built on an island in the middle of the Rhine; this allowed Vauban to combine his defensive principles with town planning, although like Mont-Royal, little of it remains.

The French retreat from the Rhine after 1697 required new fortresses; Neuf-Brisach was the most significant, designed on Vauban's 'third system', and completed after his death by Louis de Cormontaigne. Using ideas from Fort-Louis, this incorporated a regular square grid street pattern inside an octagonal fortification; tenement blocks were built inside each curtain wall, strengthening the defensive walls and shielding more expensive houses from cannon fire.

To create a more coherent border, Vauban advocated destroying poor fortifications, and relinquishing territory that was hard to defend. In December 1672, he wrote to Louvois: "I am not for the greater number of places, we already have too many, and please God we had half of that, but all in good condition!"

Many of the fortifications designed by Vauban are still standing; in 2008, twelve groups of Vauban fortifications were inscribed on the UNESCO World Heritage List for their exceptional engineering and influence on military fortifications from the 17th through the 20th centuries.

=== Infrastructure and engineering ===
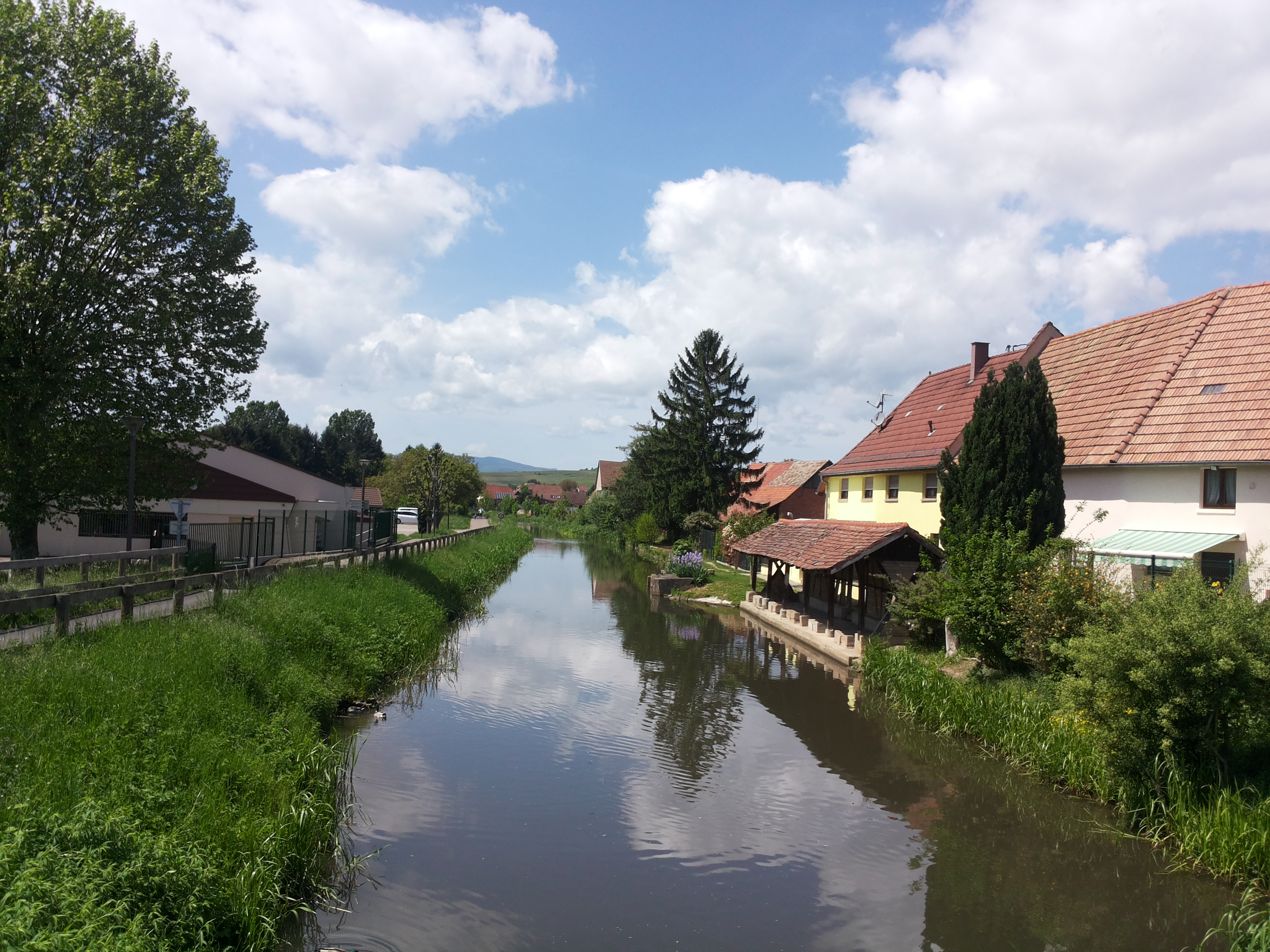
Canal de la Bruche – one of Vauban's many civilian infrastructure projects

While often overlooked, Vauban worked on many civilian infrastructure projects, including rebuilding the ports of Brest, Dunkerque and Toulon. Since his fortifications were designed for mutual support, roads and waterways were an essential part of their design, such as the Canal de la Bruche, a 20-kilometre (12 mi) canal built in 1682 to transport materials for the fortification of Strasbourg. As early as 1684, Vauban published design tables for retaining walls with heights between 3 and 25 metres. Three years later, Vauban, in his role as newly appointed Commissary General of all French fortifications, sent his engineers in the Corps du Génie Militaire his Profil général pour les murs de soutènement in which he presented his retaining wall profiles that were later adopted by engineering offers such as Bélidor (1729), Poncelet (1840) and Wheeler (1870). He also provided advice on the repair and enlargement of the Canal du Midi in 1686.

His holistic approach to urban planning, which integrated city defences with layout and infrastructure, is most obvious at Neuf-Brisach. His legacy is recognised in the Vauban district in Freiburg, named after a French army base on the same location, which developed as a model for sustainable neighbourhoods post-1998.

Vauban's 'scientific approach' and focus on large infrastructure projects strongly influenced American military and civil engineering and inspired the creation of the US Corps of Engineers in 1824. Until 1866, West Point's curriculum was modelled on that of the French Ecole Polytechnique and designed to produce officers with skills in engineering and mathematics.

To ensure a steady supply of skilled engineers, in 1690 Vauban established the Corps royal des ingénieurs militaires; until his death, candidates had to pass an examination administered by Vauban himself. Young French Huguenots made up a disproportionately high number of successful engineers due to the social and educational characteristics of French Protestantism. After the Revocation of the Edict of Nantes in 1685, a significant number of these engineers joined the English and Dutch armies to fight in Ireland, Flanders and Spain. Many of his publications, including Traité de l'attaque des places and Traité des mines, were written at the end of his career to provide a training curriculum for his successors.

== Assessment ==
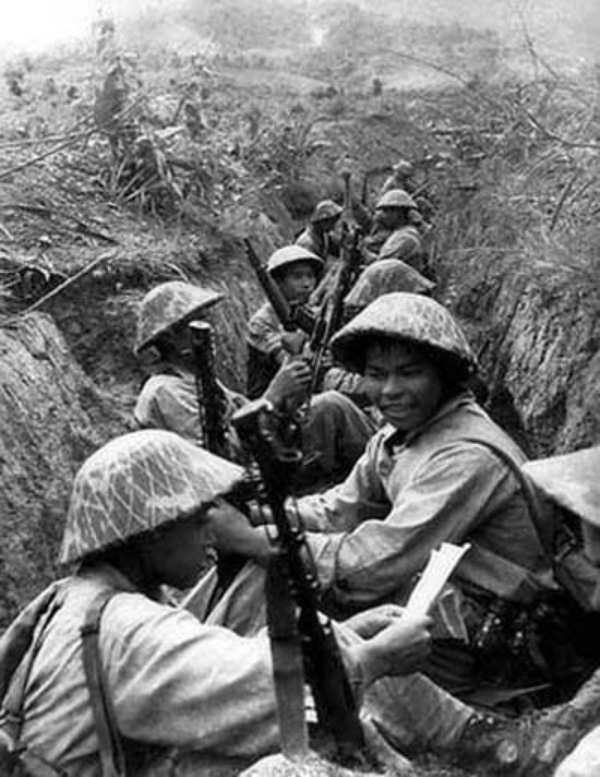
Việt Minh troops at Dien Bien Phu, 1954, in one of Vauban's parallel trenches

Vauban's offensive tactics remained relevant for centuries; his principles were clearly identifiable in those used by the Việt Minh at Dien Bien Phu in 1954. His defensive fortifications dated far more quickly, partly due to the enormous investment required; Vauban himself estimated that in 1678, 1694 and 1705, between 40 and 45% of the French army was assigned to garrison duty.

Vauban's reputation meant his designs remained in use long after developments in artillery made them obsolete, for example the Dutch fort of Bourtange, built in 1742. The Corps des ingénieurs militaires was based on his teachings; between 1699 and 1743, only 631 new candidates were accepted, the vast majority relatives of existing or former members. As a result, French military engineering became ultra-conservative, while many 'new' works used his designs, or professed to do so, such as those built by Louis de Cortmontaigne at Metz in 1728–1733. This persisted into the late 19th century; Fort de Queuleu, built in 1867 near Metz, is recognisably a Vauban-style design.

Some French engineers continued to be innovators, notably the Marquis de Montalembert, who published La Fortification perpendiculaire in 1776, a rejection of the principles advocated by Vauban and his successors; his ideas became the prevailing orthodoxy in much of Europe but were dismissed in France.

== See also ==
- Vauban fortifications
- Fortifications of Vauban UNESCO World Heritage Sites: UNESCO World Heritage Sites preserving many of Vauban's fortifications.

== Sources ==
- Afflerbach, Holger; Strachan, Hew, eds. (2012). How Fighting Ends: A History of Surrender. OUP. ISBN 978-0199693627.
- Allende, Lt-Colonel A (1805). Histoire du Corps impérial du génie: Volume 1. Magimel, Paris.
- Baldwin, James. "Engineering, military". The Columbia Encyclopedia, 6th ed.
- Childs, John (1991). The Nine Years' War and the British Army, 1688–1697: The Operations in the Low Countries. Manchester University Press. ISBN 978-0719089961.
- De Périni, Hardÿ (1896). Batailles françaises, Volume V. Ernest Flammarion, Paris.
- Desvoyes, Léon-Paul (1872). "Genealogie de la famille Le Prestre de Vauban". Bulletin de la Société des Sciences Historiques et Naturelles de Semur.;
- Delon, Michel; Picon, Antoine, eds. (2001). Encyclopedia of the Enlightenment. Routledge. ISBN 978-1579582463.
- Dobroslav, Libal (1992). An Illustrated History of Castles. Hamlyn. ISBN 978-0600573104.
- Duffy, Christopher (1995). Siege Warfare: The Fortress in the Early Modern World 1494-1660. Routledge. ISBN 978-0415146494.
- Griffith, Paddy (2006). The Vauban Fortifications of France. Osprey Publishing. ISBN 978-1841768755.
- Holmes, Richard (2011). Singleton, Charles; Jones, Dr Spencer (eds.). Vauban, Marshal Sebastien le Prestre de (1633–1707). doi:10.1093/acref/9780198606963.001.0001. ISBN 978-0198606963.
- Kamen, Henry (2001). Philip V of Spain: The King Who Reigned Twice. Yale University Press. ISBN 978-0300180541.
- Klosky, J. Ledlie; Klosky, Wynn E. (2013). "Men of action: French influence and the founding of American civil and military engineering". Construction History. 28 (3): 69–87. JSTOR 43856053.
- Langins, Jānis (2004). Conserving the enlightenment: French military engineering from Vauban to the revolution. MIT Press.
- Latcham, Paul (2004). "Armstrong, John (1674–1742)". Oxford Dictionary of National Biography (online ed.). Oxford University Press. doi:10.1093/ref:odnb/659. (Subscription, Wikipedia Library access or UK public library membership required.)
- Lepage, Jean-Denis G.G. (2009). Vauban and the French Military Under Louis XIV: An Illustrated History of Fortifications and Sieges. McFarland & Co. ISBN 978-0786444014. OCLC 733727533.
- Leridon, Henri (2004). "The Demography of a Learned Society: the Académie des Sciences (Institut de France), 1666-2030". Population. 59 (1).
- Lynn, John (1999). The Wars of Louis XIV, 1667–1714. Longman. ISBN 978-0582056299.;
- Lynn, John (1997). Giant of the Grand Siècle: The French Army, 1610-1715 (2008 ed.). Cambridge University Press. ISBN 978-0521032483.
- Manning, Roger (2006). An Apprenticeship in Arms: The Origins of the British Army 1585-1702. OUP. ISBN 978-0199261499.
- Moreri, Louis (1749). Le grand dictionnaire historique ou Le melange curieux de l'Histoire sacrée; Volume I. Libraires Associes, Paris.
- Mousnier, Roland (1979). The Institutions of France Under the Absolute Monarchy, 1598–1789. University of Chicago Press. ISBN 978-0226543277.
- Ostwald, Jamel (2006). Vauban Under Siege: Engineering Efficiency and Martial Vigor in the War of the Spanish Succession. Brill. ISBN 978-9004154896.
- Pujo, Bernard (1991). Vauban. Albin Michel. ISBN 978-2226052506.
- Schiller, Preston (2010). An Introduction to Sustainable Transportation: Policy, Planning and. Routledge. ISBN 978-1844076659.
- Tucker, Spencer C (2009). A Global Chronology of Conflict: From the Ancient World to the Modern Middle East 6V: A Global Chronology of Conflict [6 volumes]. ABC-CLIO. ISBN 978-1851096671.
- Van Hoof, Jaep (2004). Menno van Coehoorn 1641–1704, Vestingbouwer – belegeraar – infanterist. Instituut voor Militaire Geschiedenis.
- "Vauban 1633-1707". Histoire pour Tous (in French). Archived from the original on 4 February 2022.
- Vesilind, P Aame (2010). Engineering Peace and Justice: The Responsibility of Engineers to Society. Springer. ISBN 978-1447158226.
- Wolfe, Michael (2009). Walled Towns and the Shaping of France: From the Medieval to the Early Modern Era. AIAAA. ISBN 978-0230608122.

== Bibliography ==
- Halévy, Daniel (1924). Vauban. Builder of Fortresses. Geoffrey Bles.
- Hebbert, F.J. (1990). Soldier of France: Sébastien le Prestre de Vauban, 1633–1707. P. Lang. ISBN 978-0-8204-0890-3.
- Satterfield, George (2003). Princes, Posts and Partisans: The Army of Louis XIV and Partisan Warfare in the Netherlands (1673-1678). Brill. ISBN 978-9004131767.

French nobility
Preceded by first creation	Comte de Vauban; 1693–1707	Succeeded by Antoine le Prestre 1707-1754
