= Sigal =

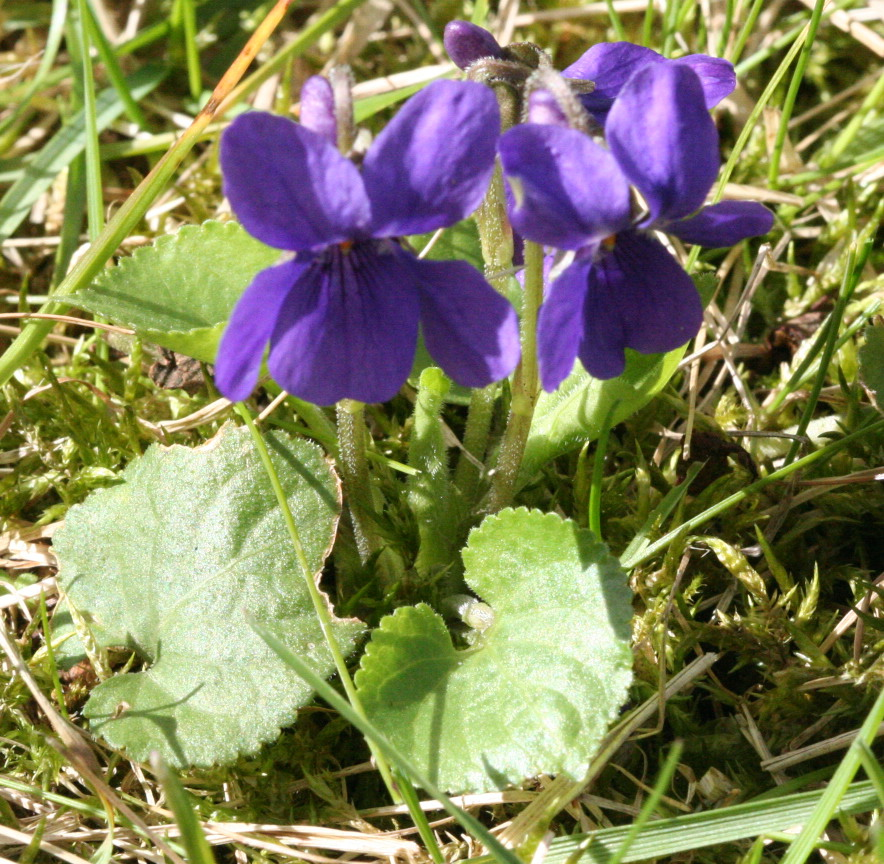
- Gender: Female

Origin
- Meaning: "Viola"

Other names
- Related names: Sigalit

Sigal (Hebrew: סיגל) is a Jewish feminine given name and a surname. Notable people with the name include:

== Given name ==
- Sigal Avin, American-Israeli writer
- Sigal Bujman, Israeli filmmaker
- Sigal Erez, American actress
- Sigal Gottlieb, American applied mathematician
- Sigal Mandelker, American lawyer
- Sigal Shachmon (born 1971), Israeli model

== Surname ==
As a surname of Ashkenazi Jewish origin, it may be a variant of Segal.

- Clancy Sigal (1926-2017), American writer
- Israel Michael Sigal, Canadian mathematician
- Ellen V. Sigal, chairperson of Friends of Cancer Research
- Isaak Sigal (1927-2026), Ukrainian scientist
- Leonid Sigal, Russian violinist
- Lisa Sigal (born 1962), American contemporary artist
- Alex Sigal, virologist, biologist

== See also ==
- All pages in Hebrew Wikipedia starting with סיגל
