= Bazoches =

- Commune
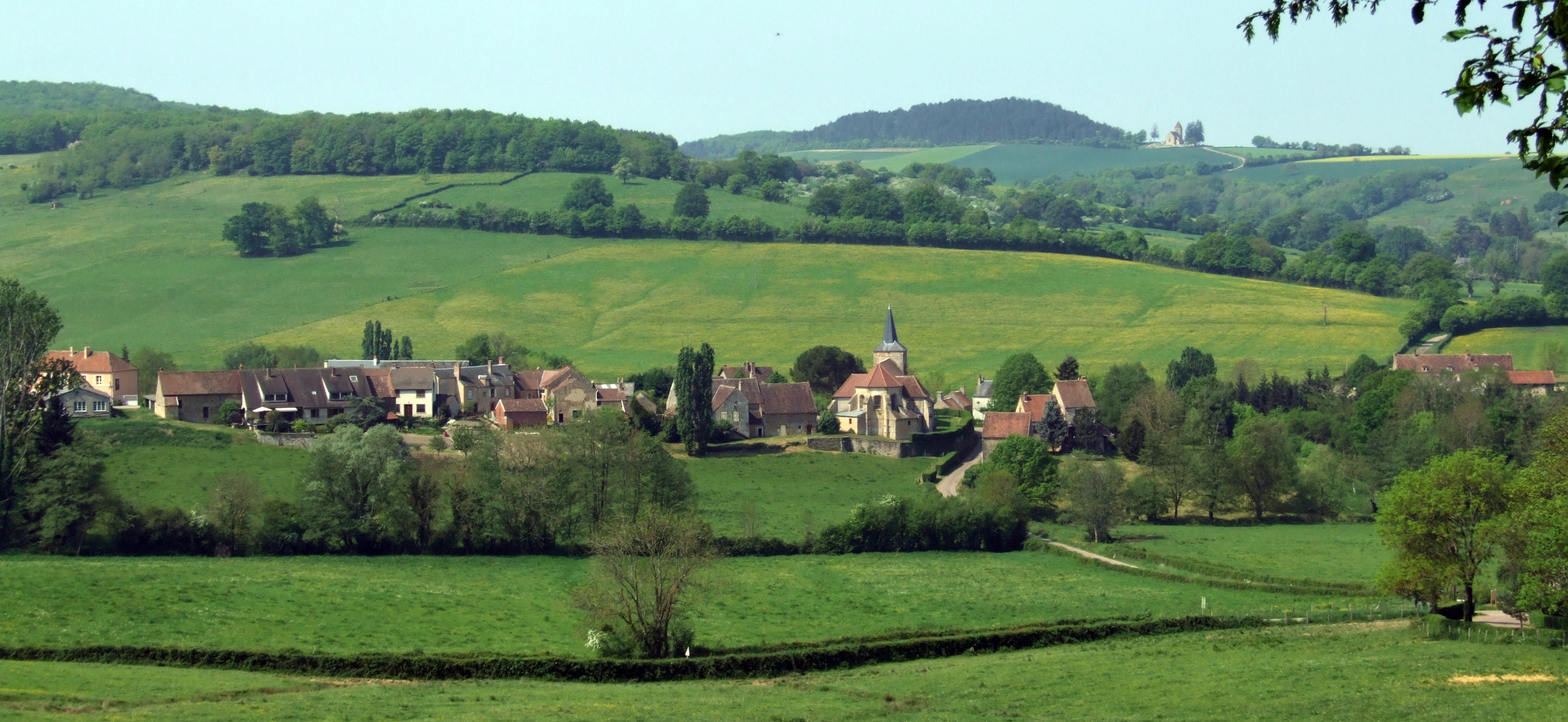
- A general view of Bazoches
- Location of Bazoches
- Location within France Location within Bourgogne-Franche-Comté
- Coordinates: 47°22′39″N 3°47′15″E
- Country: France
- Region: Bourgogne-Franche-Comté
- Department: Nièvre
- Arrondissement: Château-Chinon (Ville)
- Canton: Corbigny
- Intercommunality: CC Morvan Sommets et Grands Lacs

Government
  - Mayor (2020–2026): Jean Marie Pautrat
- Area^{1}: 14.65 km^{2} (5.66 sq mi)
- Highest elevation: 417 m (1,368 ft)
- Lowest elevation: 193 m (633 ft)
- Population (2023): 160
  - Density: 11/km^{2} (28/sq mi)
- Time zone: UTC+01:00 (CET)
  - Summer (DST): UTC+02:00 (CEST)
- INSEE/Postal code: 58023 /58190
- ^{1} French Land Register data, which excludes lakes, ponds, glaciers > 1 km^{2} (0.386 sq mi or 247 acres) and river estuaries.

Bazoches (French pronunciation: [bazɔʃ]) is a commune in the Nièvre department in central France.

== Population ==
Historical population
Year	Pop.	±% p.a.
1968	311	—
1975	283	−1.34%
1982	266	−0.88%
1990	223	−2.18%
1999	197	−1.37%
2007	164	−2.27%
2012	172	+0.96%
2017	177	+0.57%
2023	160	−1.67%
Source: INSEE

== Personalities ==
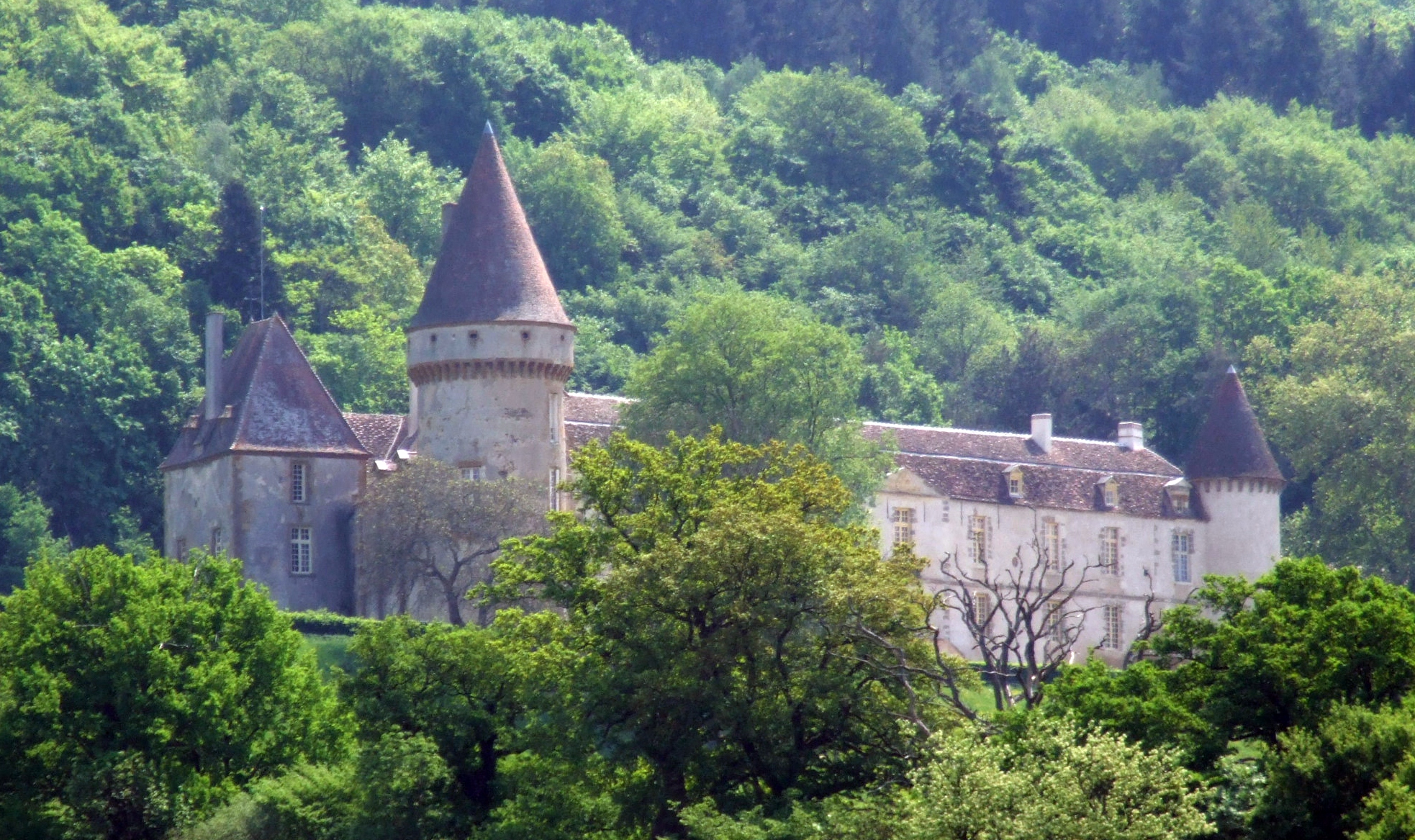
The Château de Bazoches was a property of Vauban

- The Marquis de Vauban, Marshal of France and famous military engineer, bought the Château de Bazoches in 1675.

== See also ==
- Communes of the Nièvre department
- Parc naturel régional du Morvan
