= Eddie Vitch =

Polish caricaturist and mime artist (1903–1986)

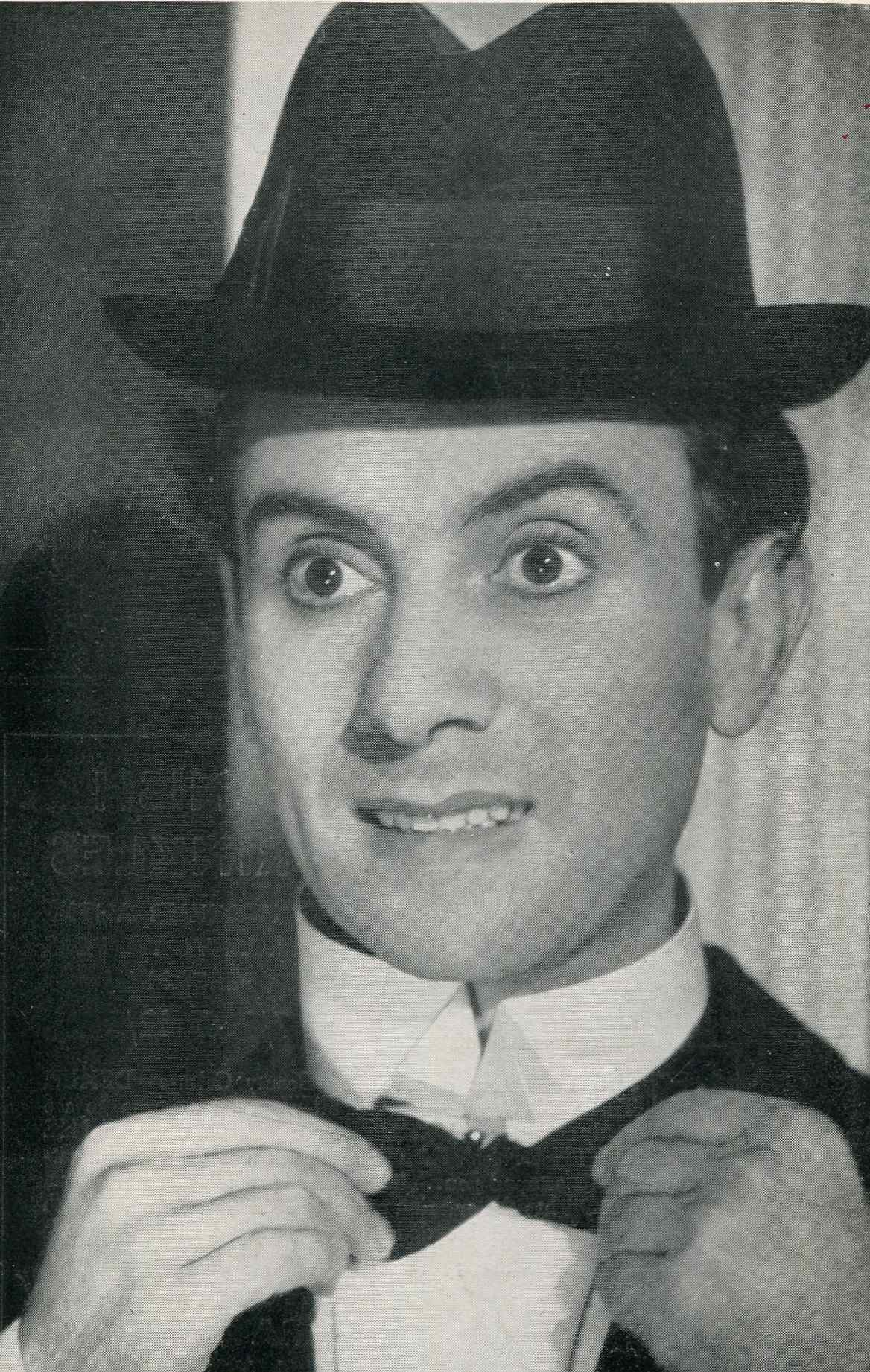
- Born: Ignace Lewkowitz; April 6, 1903; Skierniewice, Poland
- Died: September 1, 1986 (aged 83); Adelaide, South Australia
- Other name: Ignace Levkovitch
- Occupations: Mime artist, caricaturist

Ignace Levkovitch (né Lewkowitz; April 6, 1903 – September 1, 1986), known as Eddie Vitch, was a Polish-born comic entertainer and caricaturist.

== Biography ==
Levkovitch was born in Skierniewice, Poland (part of the Russian Empire at the time). He first performed cabaret in Paris as a mime artist, before making his way to the USA. In 1931, after changing his name to Eddie Vitch, he approached the Hollywood Brown Derby owner, Robert H. Cobb, and offered to draw caricatures of the famous patrons who dined at the restaurant. In a very short time, Vitch drew hundreds of pictures of Hollywood stars, and the Brown Derby became famous for the caricatures which adorned its walls. For aspiring actors, having their caricature on the walls of the Brown Derby meant they had finally 'made it' in Hollywood. For Eddie Vitch it was to become his ticket into the world of entertainment.

In 1934 he returned to Europe, and appeared as a comic mime performer in cabaret alongside such stars as Edith Piaf, Maurice Chevalier and Josephine Baker. He was performing in Paris at the start of the Second World War and - despite using his Jewish surname on contracts - began performing regularly in Berlin. By the 1940s, he was performing all over Occupied Europe and Scandinavia. His career took off during this time and he performed with the Folies Bergère, Paris, in the Berlin Wintergarten theatre, the Hippodrome, London and the Tivoli Gardens in Copenhagen.

After the war, Vitch went on to perform his comedy shows in places as far off as South Africa and Australia. He appeared on TV and had guest appearances in several movies. In 1966 he retired from theater life and moved to Australia, where he died in 1986 at the age of 83.

== Documentary ==
In 2015 work commenced on a documentary about Eddie Vitch's life, and the uncertainties over his wartime relationship with the authorities in Nazi Germany. The film, Vitch, directed by Sigal Bujman, was released in 2017 and was shown in major festivals and cinemas around the world.
