= Château de Bazoches =

Castle in Bourgogne-Franche-Comté, France

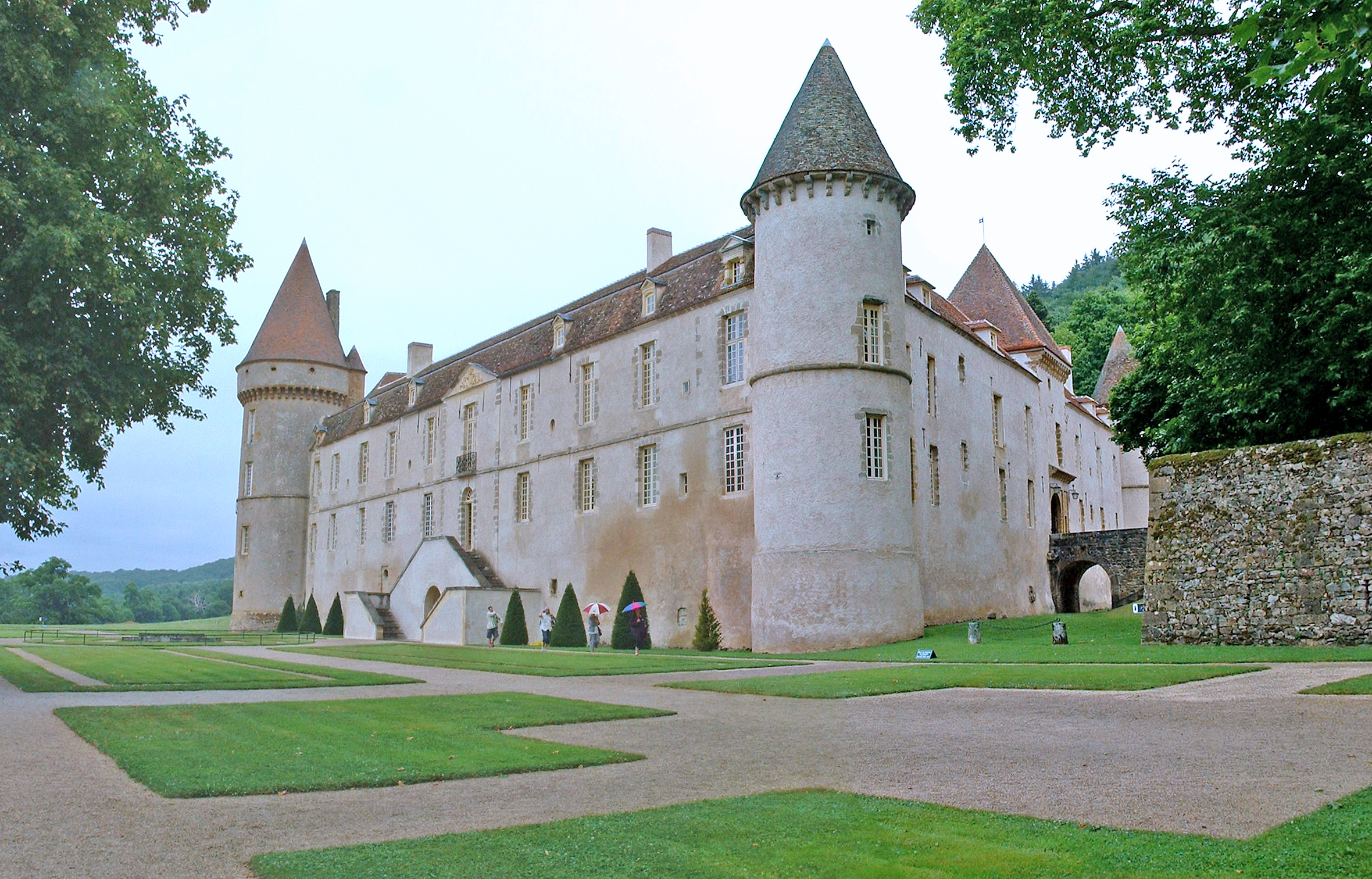
- Château de Bazoches

- Location within France
- 47°22′51″N 3°47′42″E
- Location: Bazoches Bourgogne-Franche-Comté
- Nearest city: Autun

History
- Founder: Jean de Saillenay
- Built: 12th and 17th century
- Original use: Castle
- Rebuilt: 1675

Site notes
- Current use: Private residence. Open to the public.
- Owner: Sigalas family
- Website: www.chateau-bazoches.com

Monument historique
- Designated: 1994

The Château de Bazoches is located in Bazoches, the modern region of Bourgogne-Franche-Comté, historically part of the Burgundy region of France.

== History ==
The original castle was built by Jean de Saillenay in 1180, on the site of a Roman outpost guarding the road between Autun and the administrative centre of Gallia Lugdunensis, now Sens. The design was a standard trapezoidal layout, with four towers and a keep surrounding an inner courtyard, upgraded in the 14th century.

It was sold to Jean de Bazoches in 1284 and successively owned by the Chastellux, Montmorillon and La Perrière families. In 1570, Jacques Le Prestre de Vauban acquired it when he married Françoise de la Perrière, an illegitimate daughter of the Count de Bazoches.

In 1675, Jacques Le Prestre's grandson, the military engineer Vauban, purchased the property from his cousin with money awarded by Louis XIV for his role in the capture of Maastricht in 1673, and it was extensively upgraded.

Today it is private property and classified as a listed Historic building.

== Gallery ==
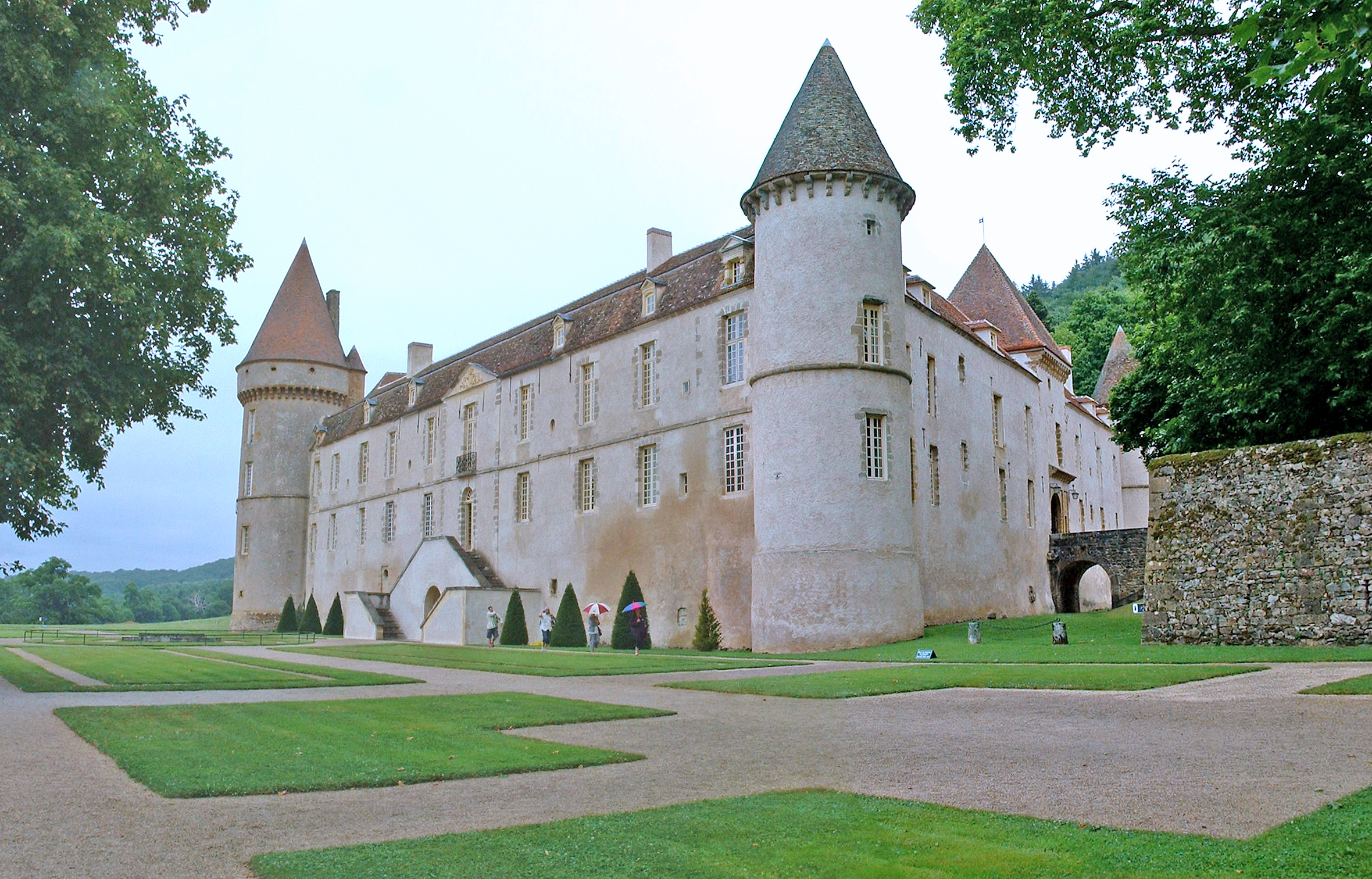
front facade of the Château

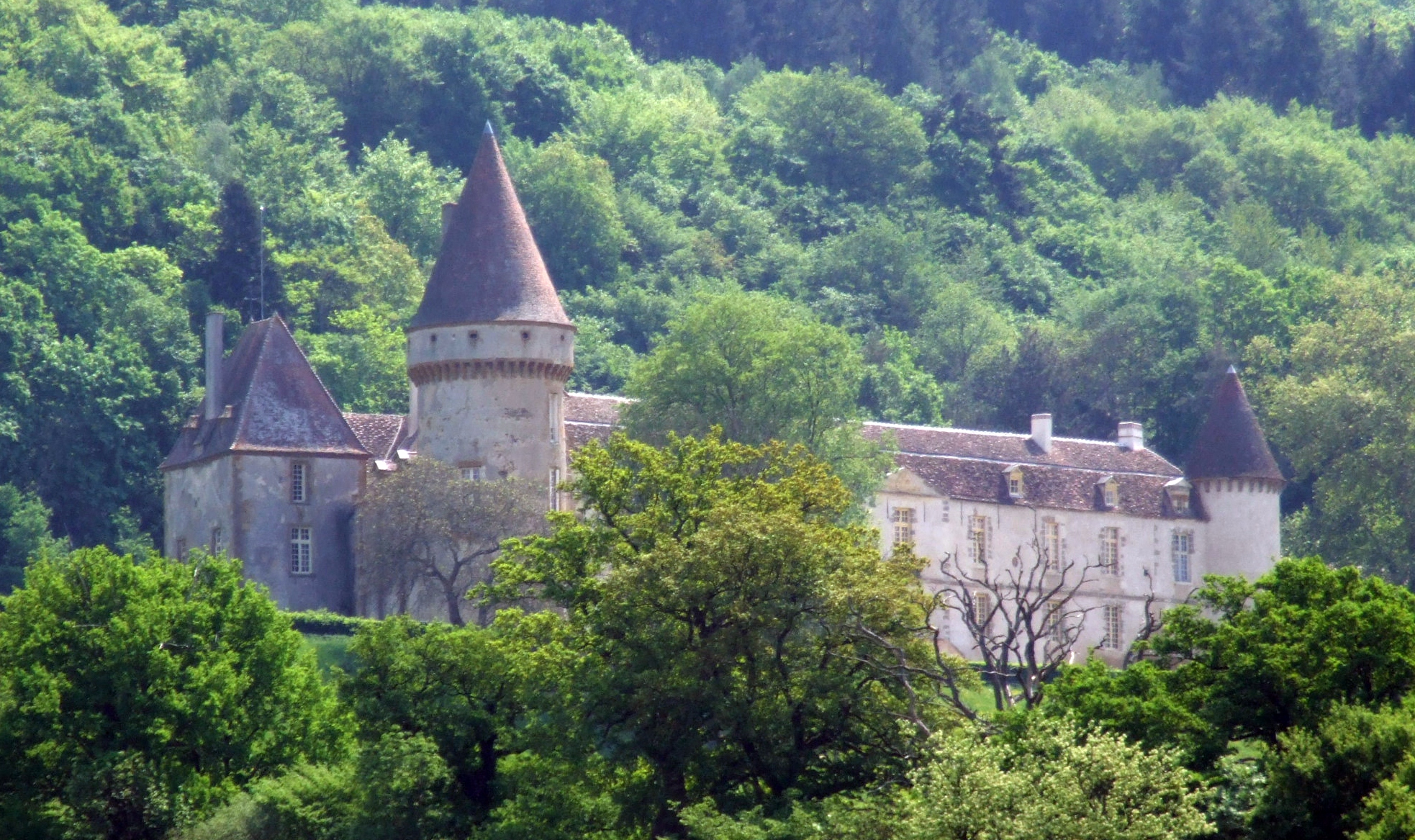
Château de Bazoches

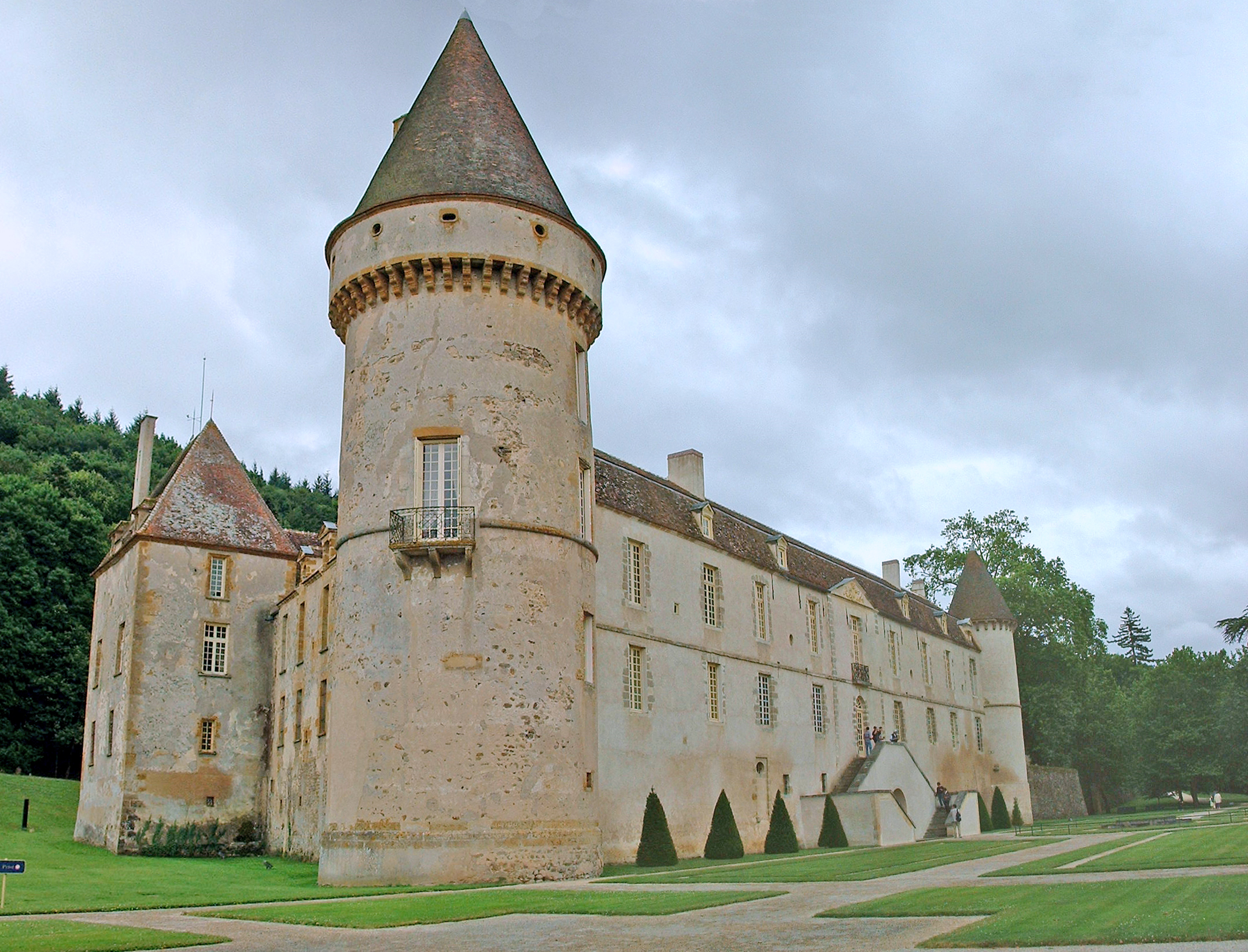
Château de Bazoches, Nièvre

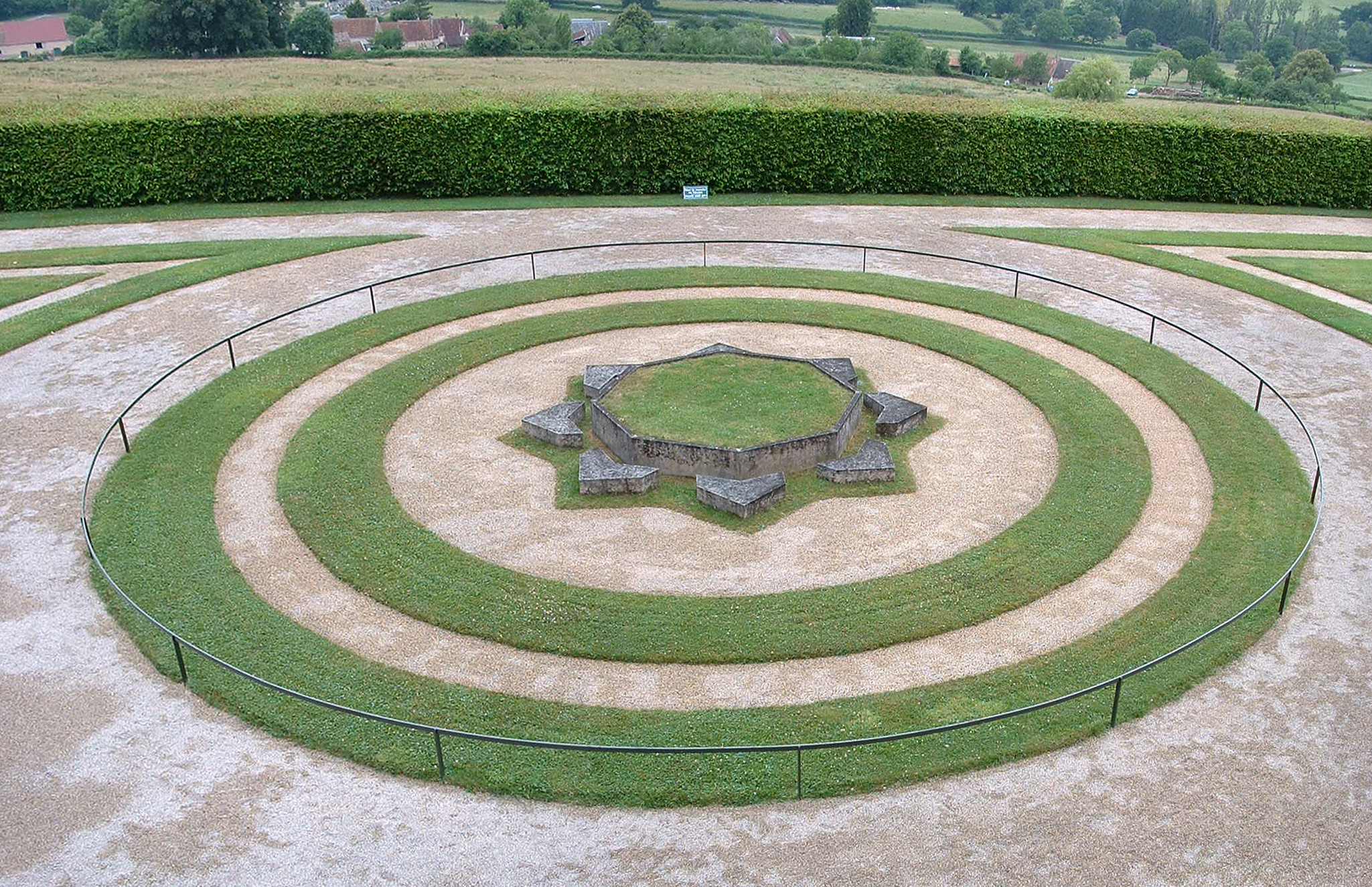
fortifications of Vauban

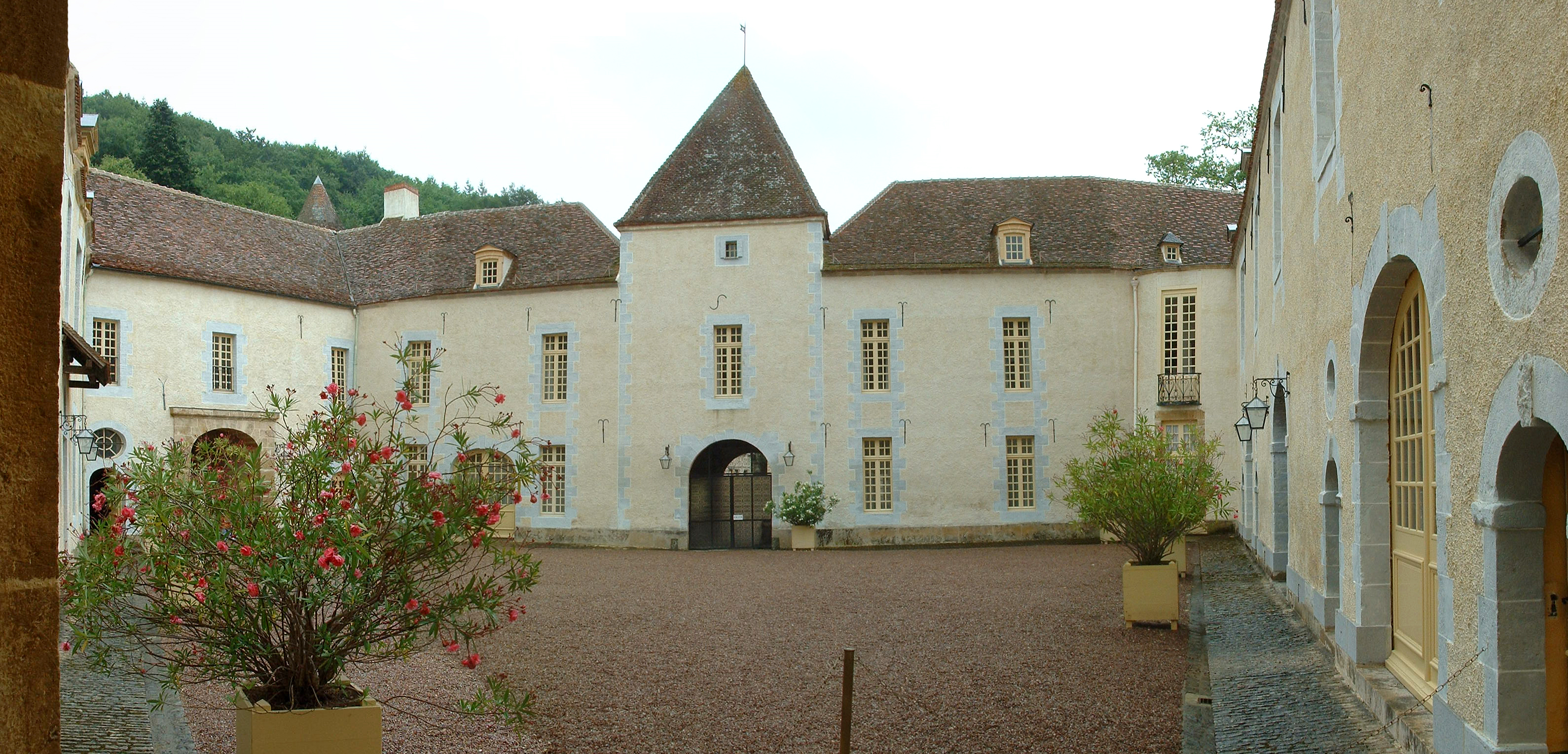
the inside court yard

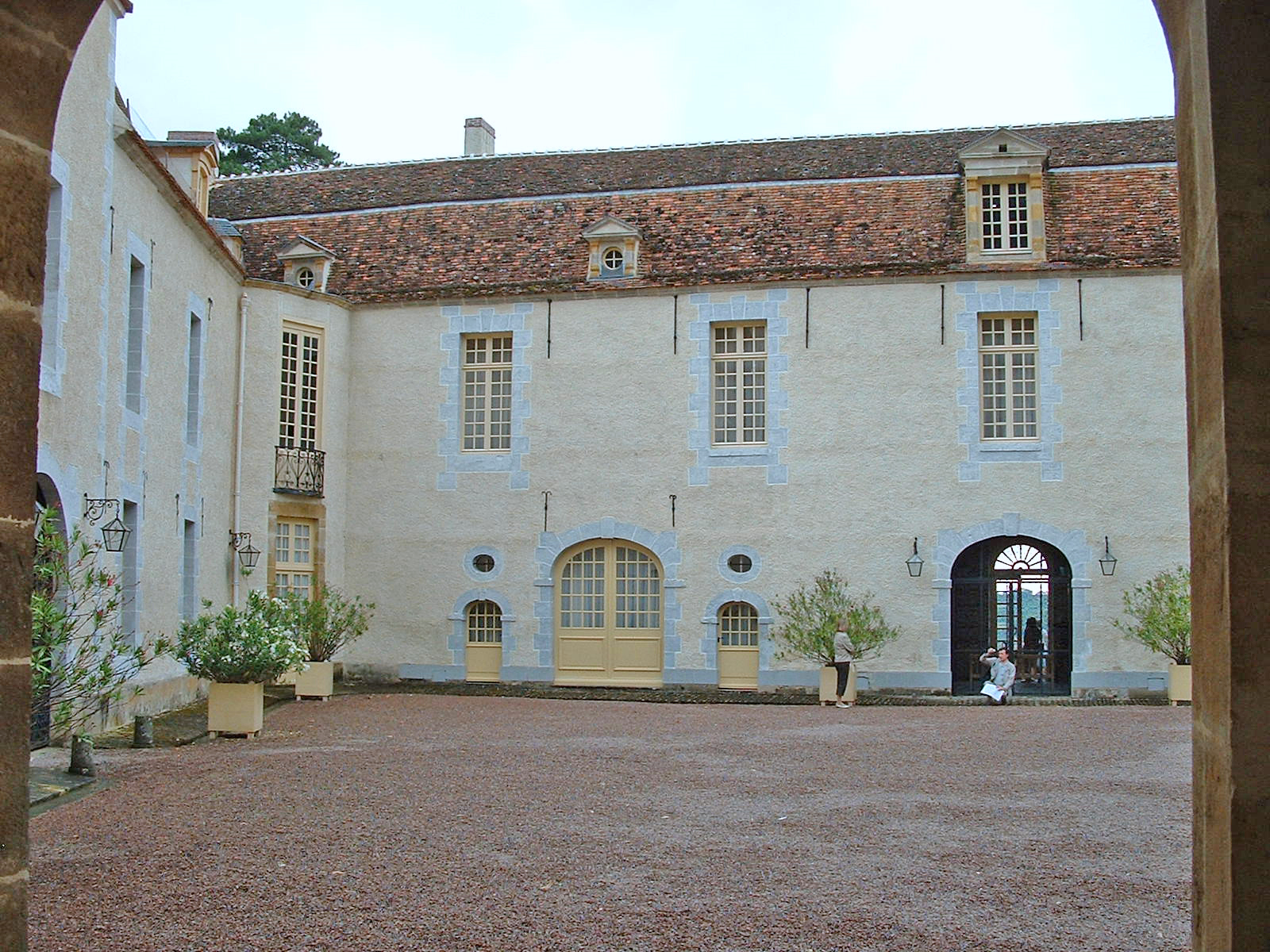
the inside court

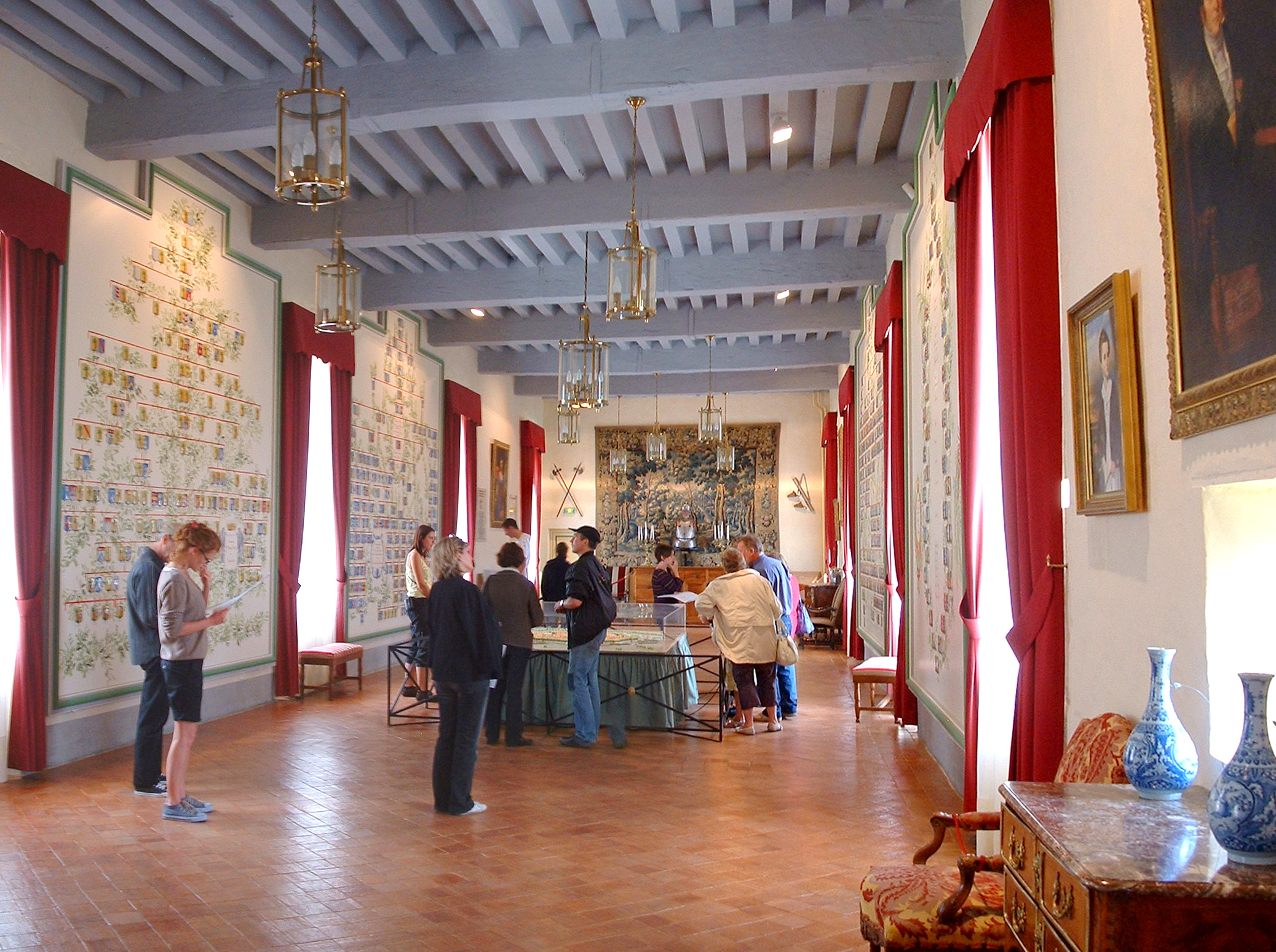
the grand gallery

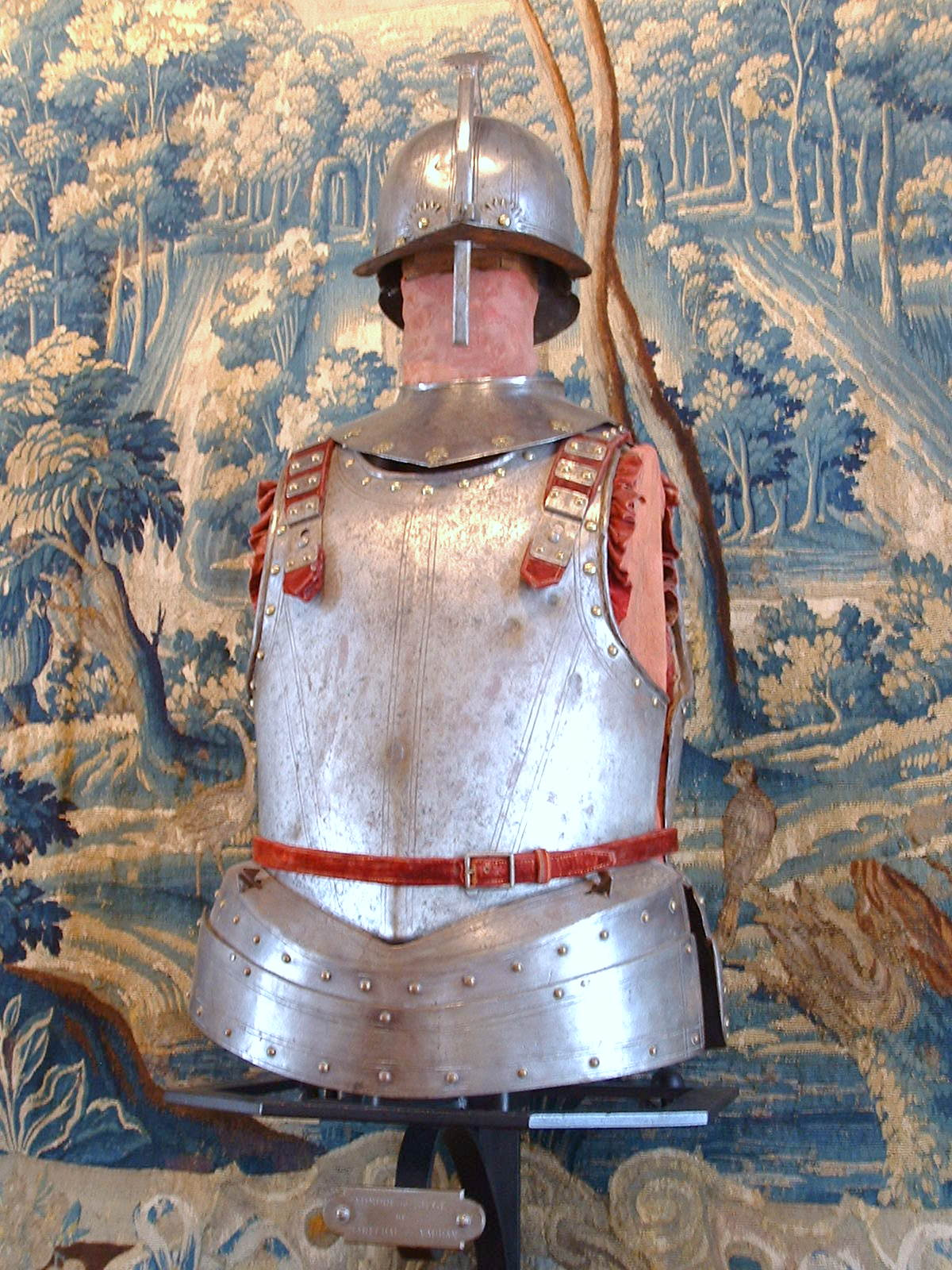
siege armor displayed at the Chateâu

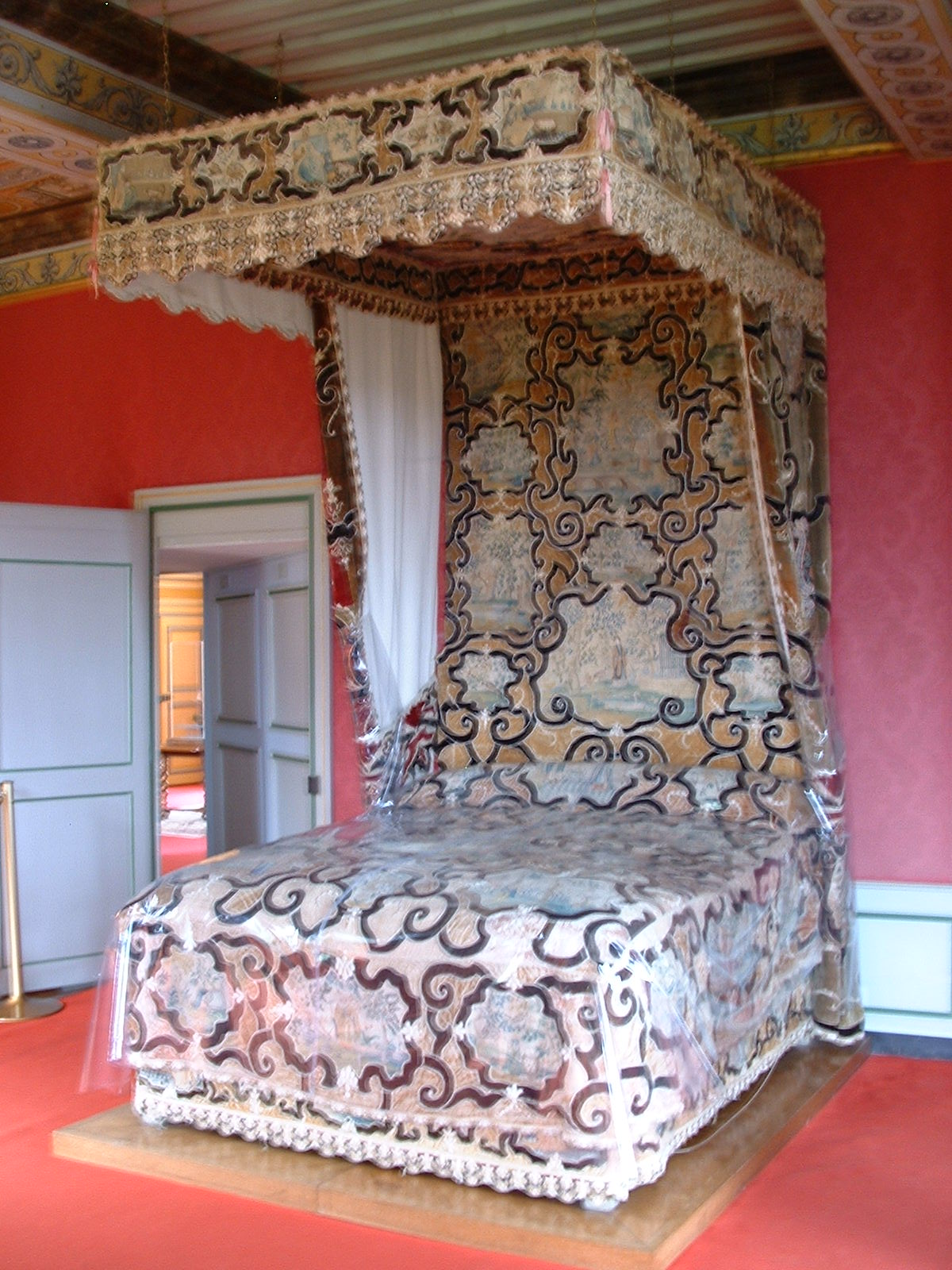
le lit de Vauban

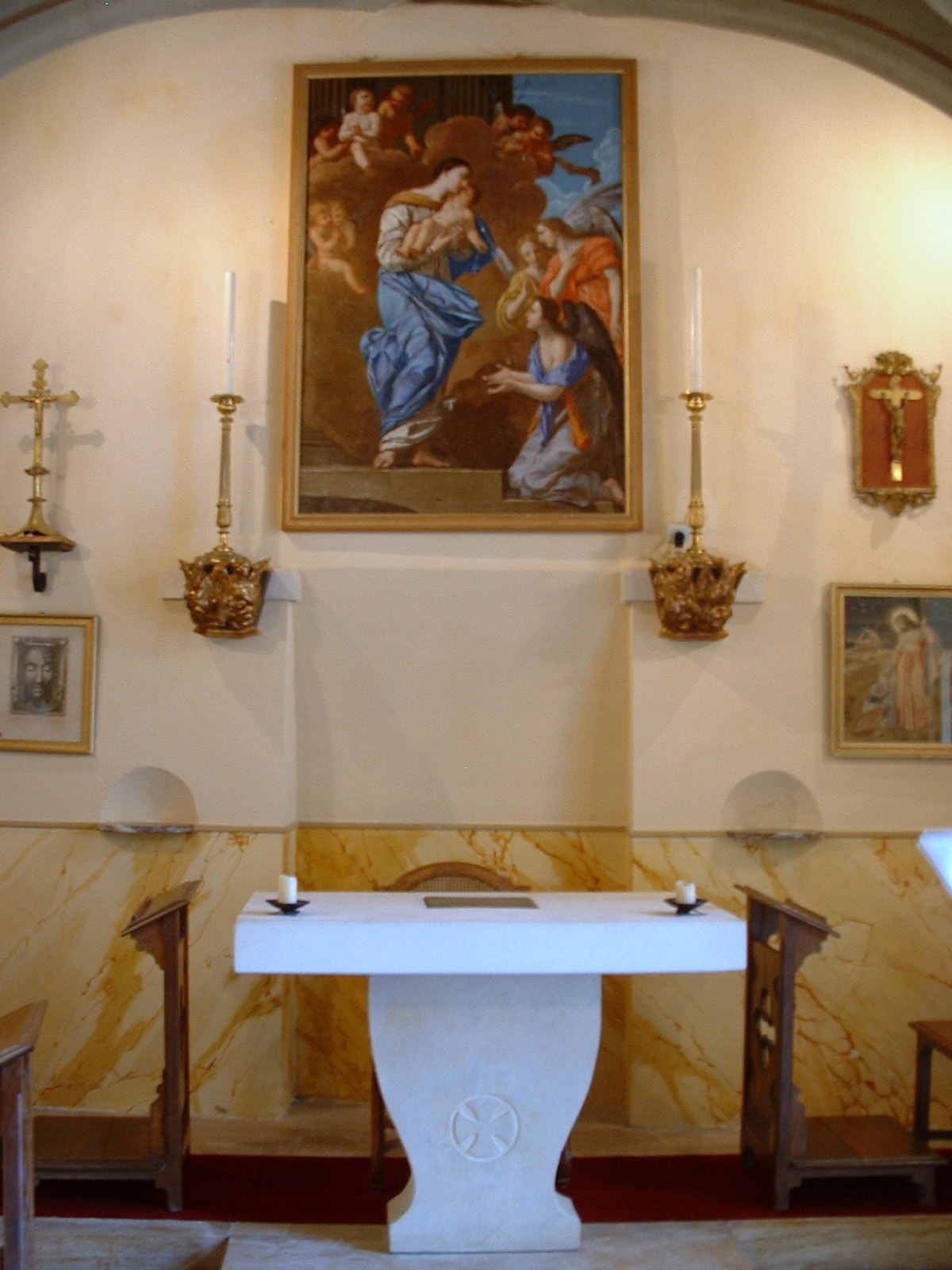
the Château chapel

== See also ==
- List of castles in France
