= Sigal Bujman =

Israeli filmmaker

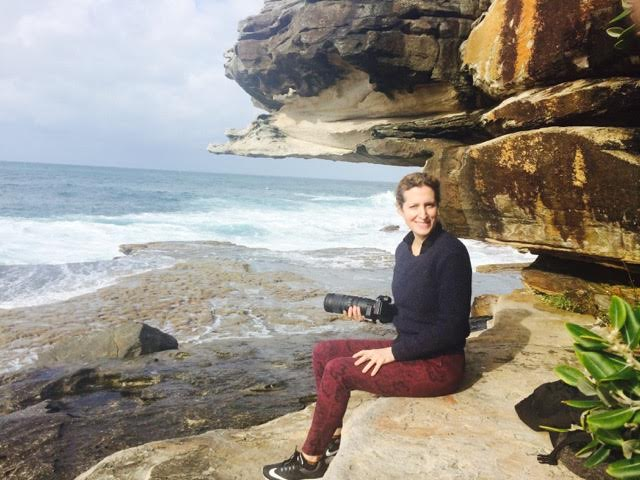
Filmmaker Sigal Bujman on a shoot

Sigal Bujman is a filmmaker who co-created the original travel series Fantastic Festivals of the World (2003-2010). Fantastic Festivals of the World was broadcast internationally on the Travel Channel and Discovery Network. Sigal writes, directs and produces documentaries since 2000. She partnered with Marc Pingry in 2002. Her work is published on PBS, National Geographic and Discovery Channels.

Her work as a director and co-producer includes:

- Vitch (2017)
- The History of China (two episodes, 2014)
- Papa Boss - (2013)
- Koxinga - A Hero's Legacy (2012)
- Fantastic Festivals of the World series (2003-2010)
- Haifa - The Silenced Voices (2001)

Born in Kibbutz Saar, Israel, Sigal currently lives in Seattle, USA, with her husband and two children.
