= Fort Bourtange =

Fort in Groningen, Netherlands

- Bourtange, Groningen, Netherlands
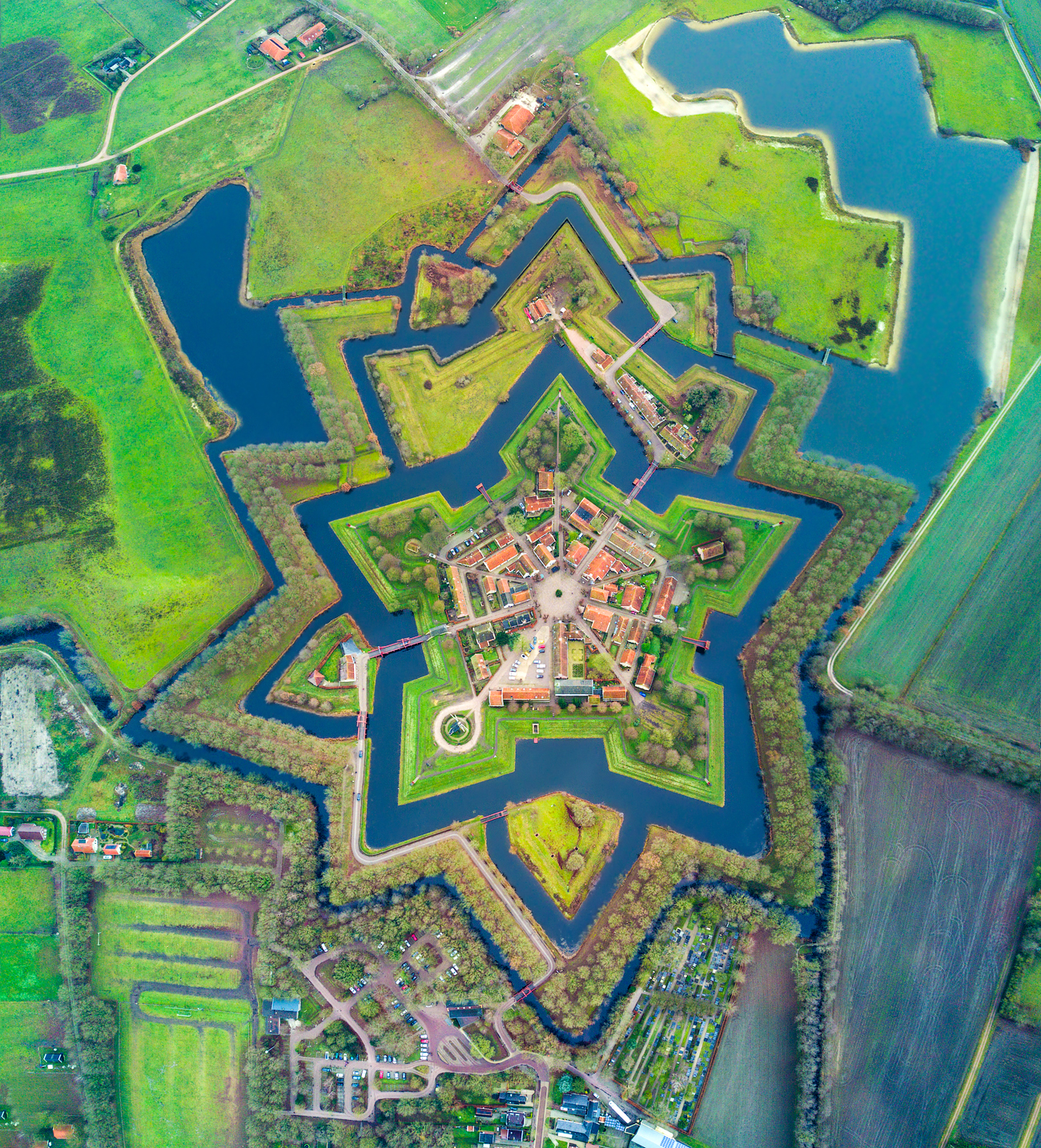
- Fort Bourtange from the air

Site information
- Type: fort
- Open to the public: Yes
- Condition: Intact

Location
- Location in Groningen in the Netherlands
- Location within Groningen (province)
- Coordinates: 53.006°N 7.192°E

Site history
- Built: 1593
- In use: c. 1593-1851
- Events: Eighty Years' War, Third Anglo-Dutch War

Fort Bourtange (Dutch: Vesting Bourtange) is a fort in the village of Bourtange, Groningen, Netherlands. It was built under orders of William the Silent and completed in 1593. Its original purpose was to control the only road between Germany and the city of Groningen, which was controlled by the Spaniards during the time of the Eighty Years' War.

After experiencing its final battle in 1672, the fort continued to serve in the defensive network on the German border until it was finally given up in 1851 and converted into a village. The Fort was never taken by force. Fort Bourtange currently serves as a historical museum.

== History ==
At the start of the Eighty Years' War (1568–1648), the Spaniards had control over Groningen and the passage to Germany through a marshy area. William, the instigator of the Dutch Revolt, deemed it necessary to seize control of the link between Groningen and Germany. He decided to have a fortification built in the Bourtange passage. A fort was completed in 1593, with a network of canals and lakes which were used as moats. Soon after its construction, Spanish forces from Groningen besieged it, though the attack ended in failure.

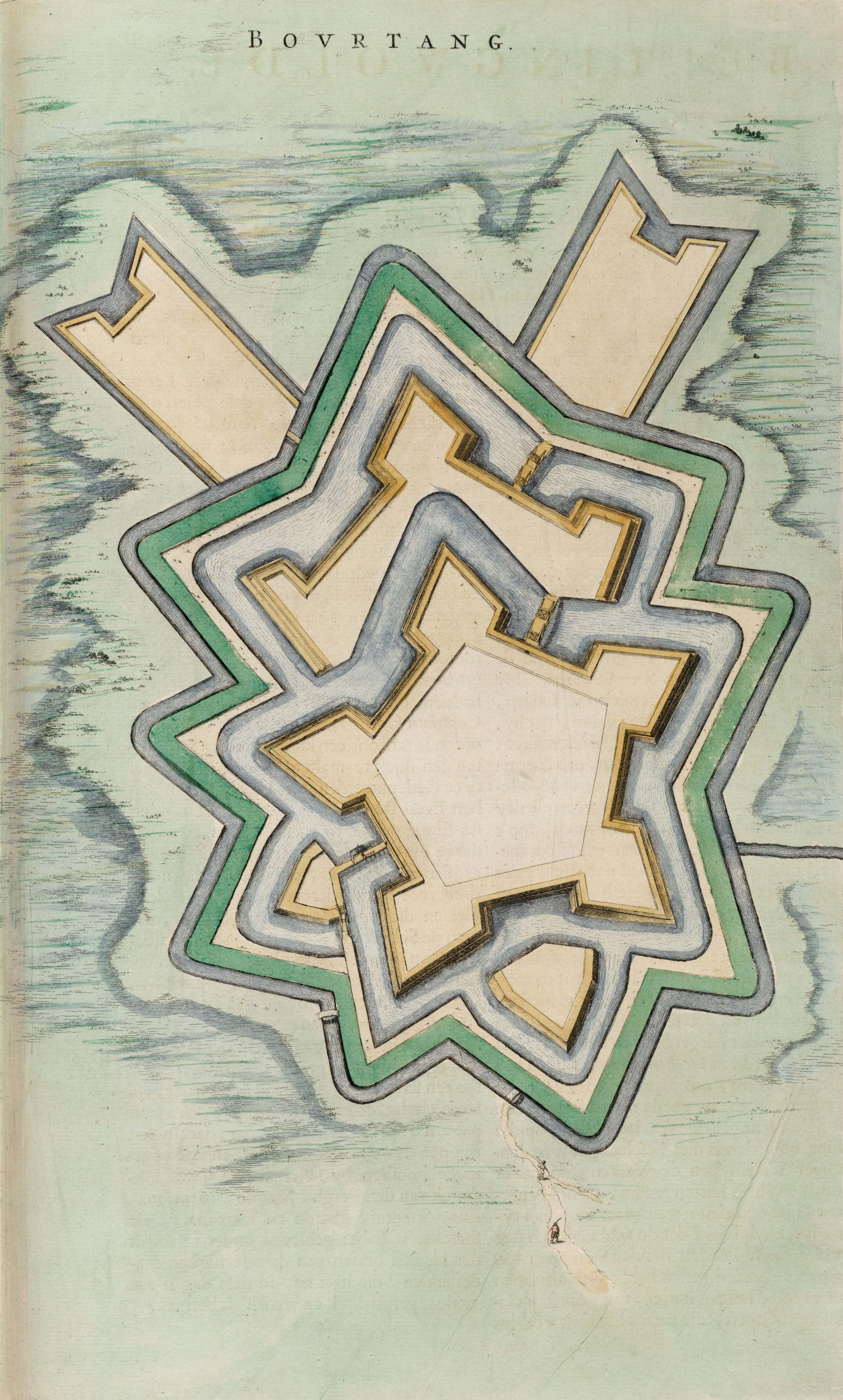
Bourtange, Atlas van Loon 1649

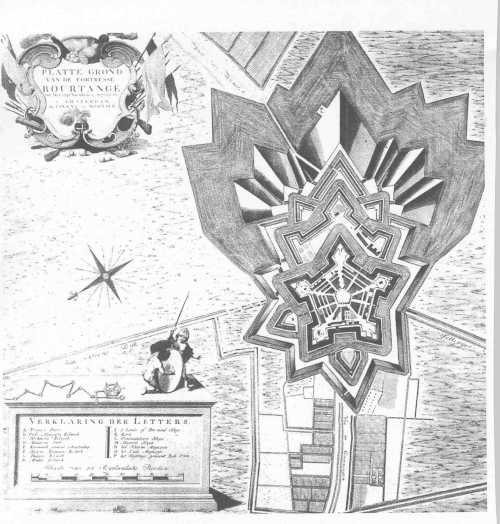
Plan of Bourtange, 1742

Fort Bourtange faced another siege in 1672 against invading forces of Christoph Bernhard von Galen the Prince-Bishop of Münster, France's German ally in the Franco-Dutch War. After capturing 28 cities and towns in the northern Netherlands, they demanded that the fort be surrendered. The fort's governor, Captain Protts, refused, and the Münsters replied with a frontal assault. Thanks to the surrounding marshes and the time-tested fortifications, the invading army was repelled successfully.

After its conversion into a village in 1851, living conditions began to deteriorate. Over 100 years later in 1960, the local government decided to stop the decline by restoring the old fort to its 1740–50 appearance and converting into a historical museum.

== Gallery ==
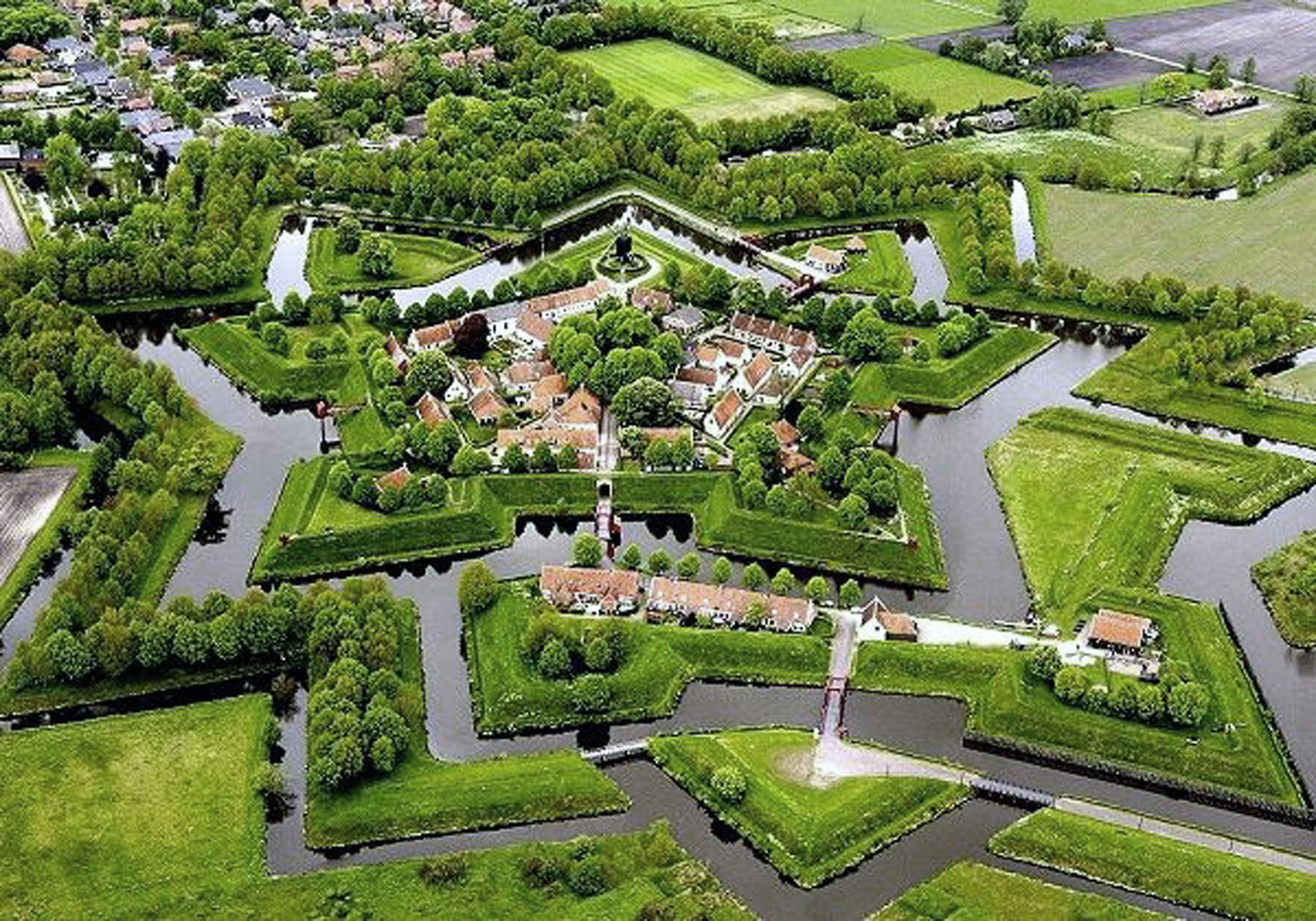
Aerial view

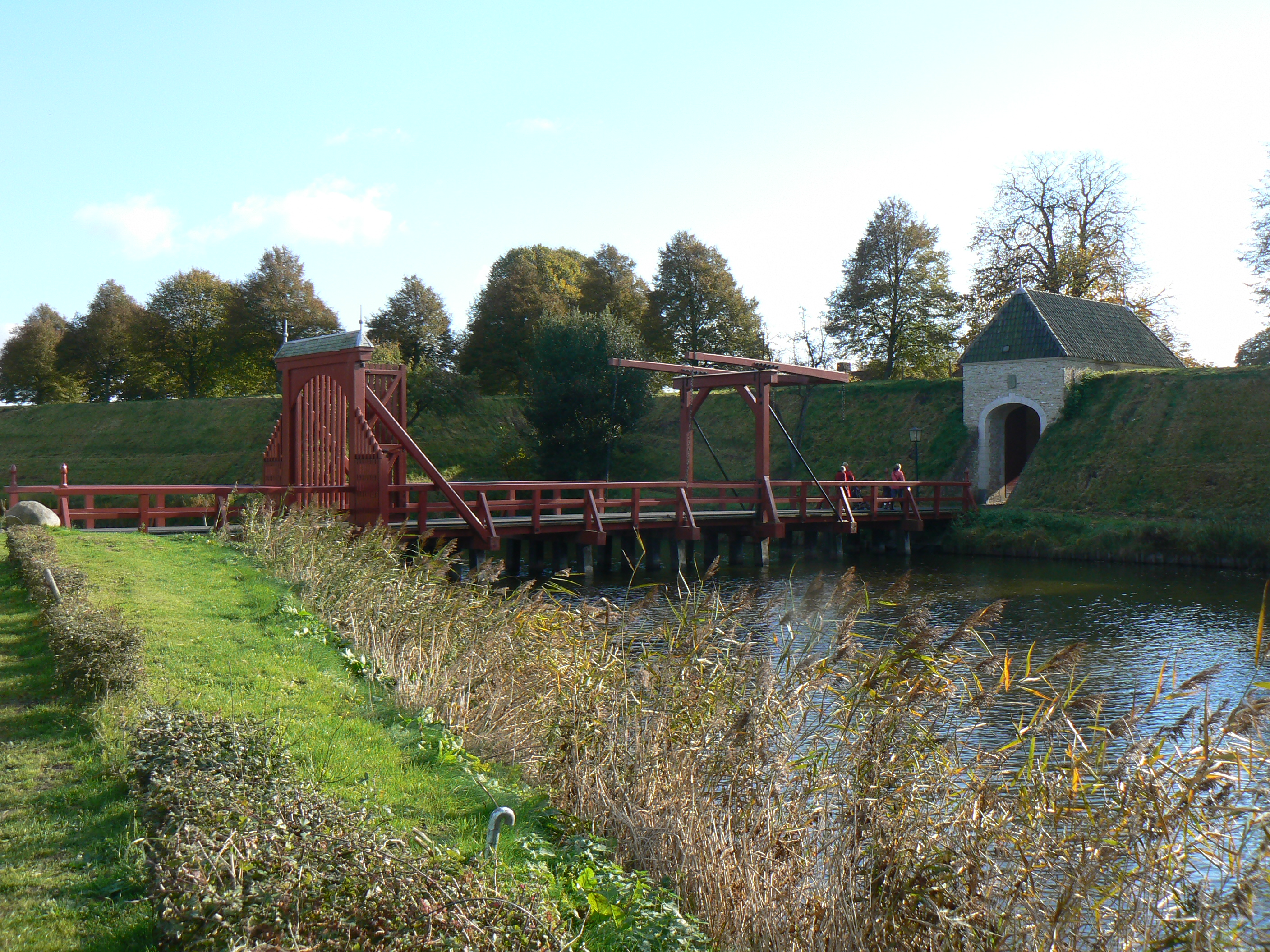
Bourtange fortification

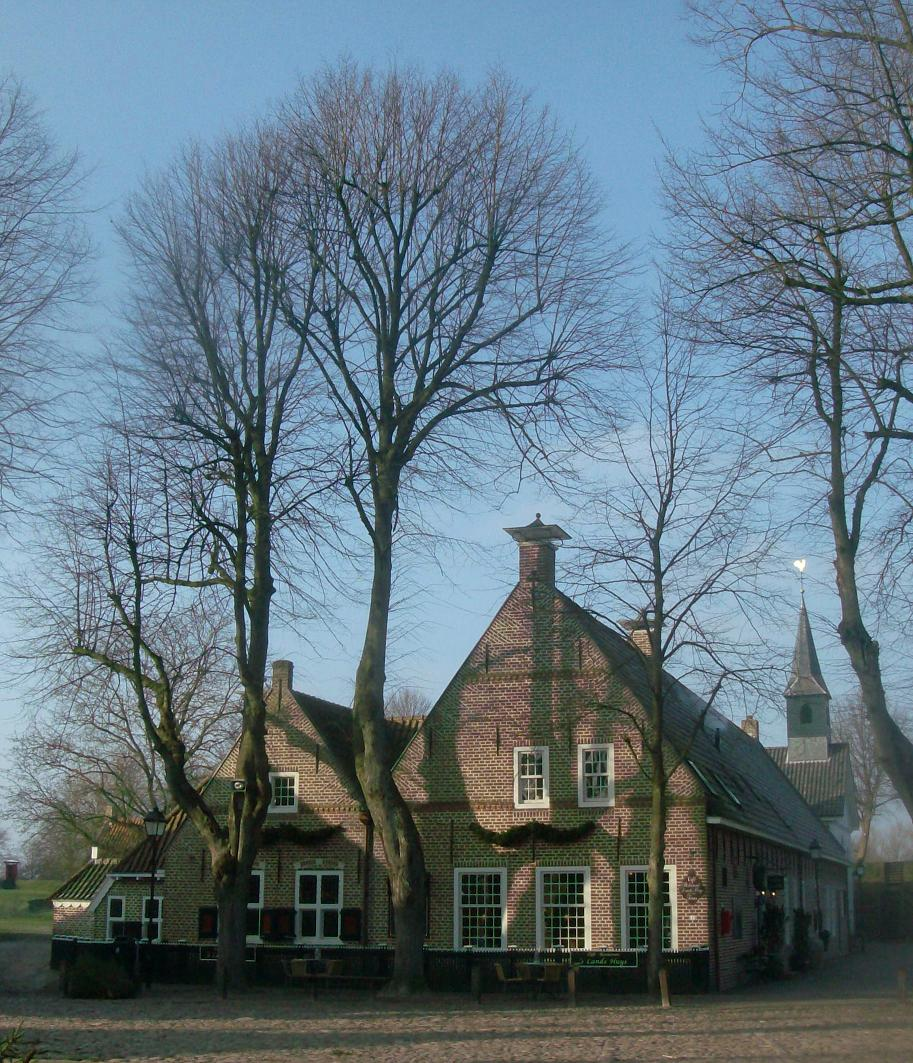
Centre of the village

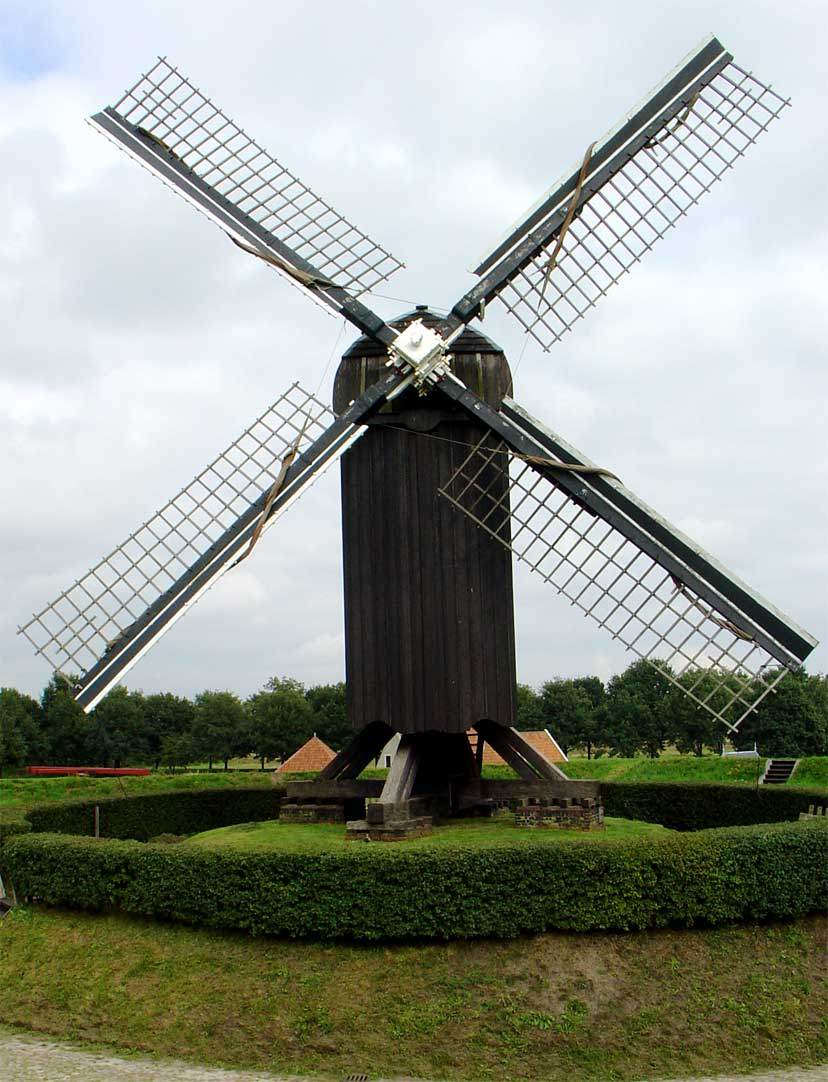
Windmill at Bourtange

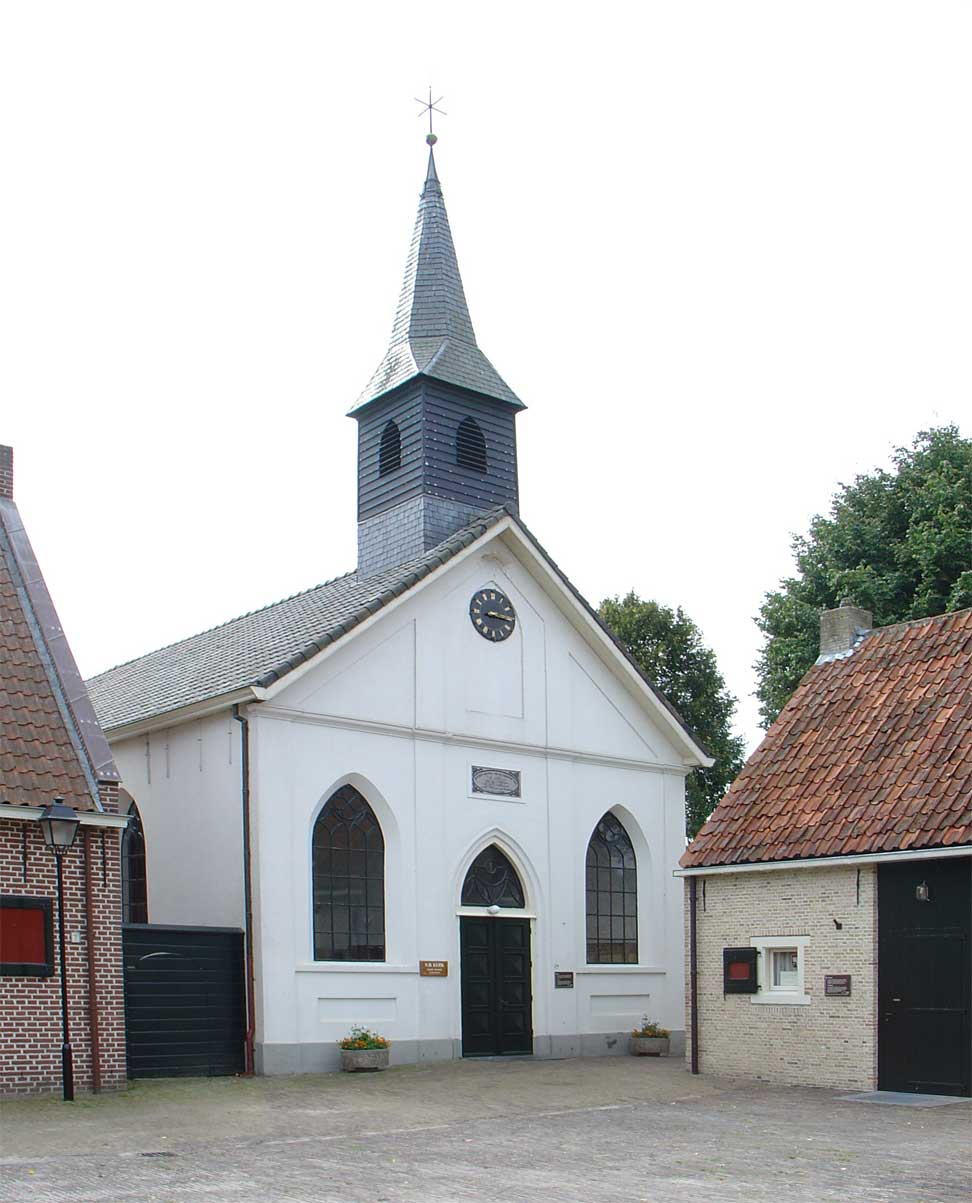
Church at Bourtange

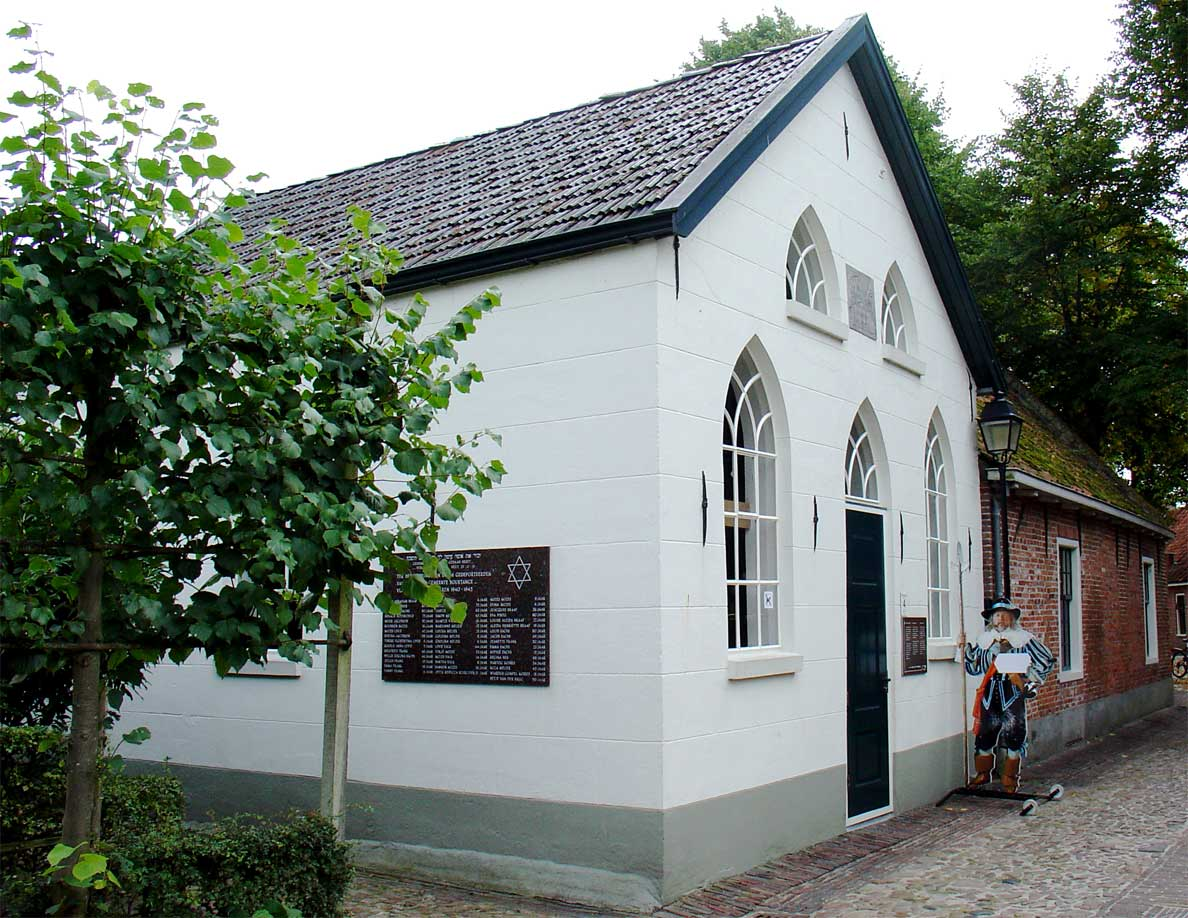
The former synagogue (now a museum)

Pike drill and musket firing

Cannon loading and firing

== See also ==
- Fortress of St. Elizabeth
