= Alex Sigal =

Virologist, biologist

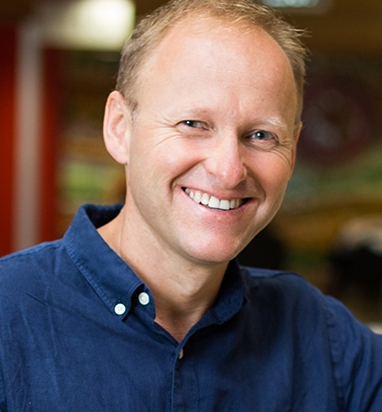
- Alex Sigal
- Born: 1970 (age 55–56)
- Citizenship: Israeli, Canadian
- Education: BSc, University of Toronto, PhD, Weizmann Institute of Science
- Known for: Isolation of SARS-CoV-2 Beta variant; establishing ability of Beta and Omicron variants to escape antibody neutralization from previous infections and vaccines.
- Awards: EMBO Fellow (2007); Human Frontiers Long-Term fellowship (2007); Human Frontiers Career Development Award (2012)
- Scientific career
- Fields: Virology
- Workplaces: Africa Health Research Institute; University of KwaZulu-Natal; Hebrew University of Jerusalem
- Doctoral advisor: Uri Alon
- Other academic advisors: David Baltimore
- Website: https://www.sigallab.net/

Alex Sigal (born 1970) is a South Africa–based virologist at the Africa Health Research Institute in Durban, South Africa, the University of KwaZulu-Natal in Durban, and the Hebrew University of Jerusalem. His work concentrates on emerging viruses. His laboratory was the first to isolate the live Omicron BA sub variant and the live Beta variant of SARS-CoV-2 first detected in South Africa. Sigal’s laboratory was also the first to report results on the ability of the Omicron variant to escape antibody neutralization in individuals who had two doses of the Pfizer BNT162b2 vaccine as well as from previous infections, with results also suggesting that vaccination combined with a booster or previous infection can offer protection from symptomatic infection with Omicron.

== Education ==
Sigal earned his bachelor's degree from the University of Toronto, Master's degree from the Weizmann Institute of Science, and PhD in Systems Biology from the Weizmann Institute of Science under the supervision of Uri Alon.

== Research interests ==
Sigal joined the laboratory of David Baltimore in 2007 at Caltech for his postdoctoral work where he worked on problems related to HIV virology. He joined the Africa Health Research Institute in 2013 in Durban, South Africa as a Max Planck Research Group Leader affiliated with the Max Planck Institute for Infection Biology in Berlin. While there, he broadened his research to the study of drug-resistant tuberculosis and in 2020 to the SARS-CoV-2 virus.

Sigal's current core research is directed at understanding virus evolution, long term-persistence and its consequences for transmission and immune escape, and long term effects, with particular interest in the effects of co-infections such as HIV and TB, antibody neutralization, and cell-to-cell spread of viruses. In particular, Sigal's work has investigated how heavily mutated viruses evolve in immune-compromised individuals.

== Awards ==
- EMBO Fellow (2007)
- Human Frontiers Long-Term fellowship (2007)
- Human Frontiers Career Development Award (2013)

== Selected publications ==
- Cele, Sandile; Gazy, Inbal; Jackson, Laurelle; Hwa, Shi-Hsia; Tegally, Houriiyah; Lustig, Gila; Giandhari, Jennifer; Pillay, Sureshnee; Wilkinson, Eduan; Naidoo, Yeshnee; Karim, Farina; Ganga, Yashica; Khan, Khadija; Bernstein, Mallory; Balazs, Alejandro B.; Gosnell, Bernadett I.; Hanekom, Willem; Moosa, Mahomed-Yunus S.; Lessells, Richard J.; De Oliveira, Tulio; Sigal, Alex (2021). "Escape of SARS-CoV-2 501Y.V2 from neutralization by convalescent plasma". Nature. 593 (7857): 142–146. Bibcode:2021Natur.593..142C. doi:10.1038/s41586-021-03471-w. PMC 9867906. PMID 33780970.
- Madhi, Shabir A.; et al. (2021). "Efficacy of the ChAdOx1 nCoV-19 Covid-19 Vaccine against the B.1.351 Variant". New England Journal of Medicine. 384 (20): 1885–1898. doi:10.1056/NEJMoa2102214. PMC 7993410. PMID 33725432.
- Cele, Sandile; et al. (23 December 2021). "Omicron extensively but incompletely escapes Pfizer BNT162b2 neutralization". Nature. 602 (7898): 654–656. doi:10.1038/d41586-021-03824-5. PMC 8866126. PMID 35016196.
