= Sigala (disambiguation) =

Sigala (born 1992) is a British DJ and music producer.

Sigala may also refer to:

== Places ==
- Sigala, Hiiu County, Estonia, a village
- Sigala, a beach town in Hurghada, Egypt

== People ==
- Massimo Sigala (born 1951), Italian racecar driver
- Pascual Sigala (born 1968), Mexican politician
- Alejandro Gomez Sigala (born 1960), Venezuelan equestrian competitor

== Other uses ==
- Sigala, title character and recipient of the Sigalovada Sutta in Buddhism

== See also ==
- Sigalas
