= Roland Doré (sculptor) =

French sculptor

- Born: 1616
- Died: 1660 (aged 43–44)
- Occupation: Sculptor

Roland Doré was a 17th-century sculptor and his workshop or "atelier" produced many sculptures for the enclos paroissiaux or "parish closes" of Brittany. In particular his work can be seen on calvaries and in the church's south porch. He was born in 1616 and died in 1660. Little detail of his life is known but it is recorded that he practised as an architect in Landerneau, as well as running his workshop, and was recorded as calling himself the "Sculpteur du Roi" (The King's sculptor). His works, all of an ecclesiastical nature, are mainly located in Léon and the north of Cornouaille. They can be taken as works by Doré's workshop rather than just by Doré himself. Brittany is particularly rich in calvaries, some of a very elaborate nature. In most cases the calvary involves both the crucifixion cross and side crosses or gibbets bearing the good and the bad robbers. Below this, on the crosspieces, were statues of those present at the crucifixion. A feature of Breton calvaries is that most of the statues were carved as a pair (géminées in French) and effectively back to back. Doré's output was prodigious and he worked on nine monuments in Saint-Thégonnec, five in Logonna-Daoulas and four in the parish of Plougastel-Daoulas. He also received four commissions to work in Hanvec, three in Guiclan, Irvillac and Lampaul-Guimiliau and two commissions in Cléden-Cap-Sizun, Hôpital-Camfrout, Landerneau, La Martyre, Plabennec, Pleyben, Plogonnec, Saint-Nic, Saint-Servais and Saint-Urbain.

== Main works ==
Brittany is divided into five departments: Côtes-d'Armor, Finistère, Ille-et-Vilaine, Loire-Atlantique and Morbihan. Dore's works will here be recorded per department and for Finistère a further subdivision into its arrondissements of Morlaix, Châteaulin, Quimper and Brest.

== Works by Doré in the Arrondissement of Brest ==
Doré is attributed with the following works in the Brest arrondissement.

=== Hôpital-Camfrout ===
For the Église Notre-Dame de Bonne Nouvelle in Hôpital-Camfrout, Doré sculpted a Christ sauveur and also worked on the Croix du Run and the Calvaire de Troan.

=== Plabennec ===
The Locmaria-Lan chapel in Plabennec holds a Dorė statue of the Virgin Mary and Child in a niche in the bell-tower and the atelier are credited with carving the crucifix on the Calvaire de Scaven.

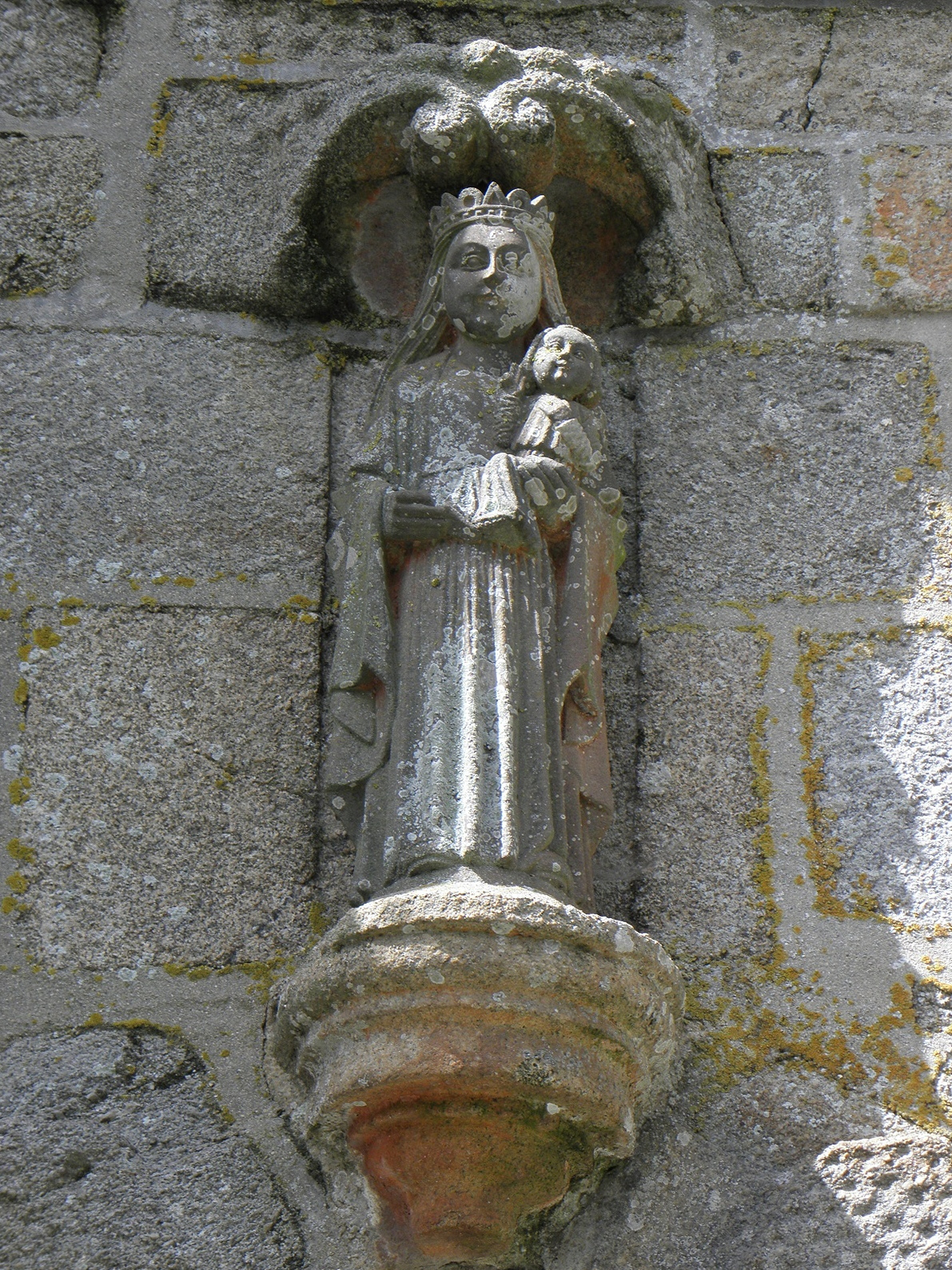
Virgin Mary and child/Locmaria-Lan chapel

=== La Martyre ===
La Martyre's Croix de Kerlavarec, of which only the shaft of the cross remains, is attributed to Dorė.

=== Plougastel-Daoulas ===
In Plougastel-Daoulas, the Doré atelier executed statues for the Saint-Guénolé chapel's calvary which has the date 1654 inscribed on the pedestal supporting the cross. The statues are of Guénolé reversed with the Virgin Mary, the crucifix reversed with the Virgin Mary holding the baby Jesus and Saint Peter reversed with John the Evangelist.

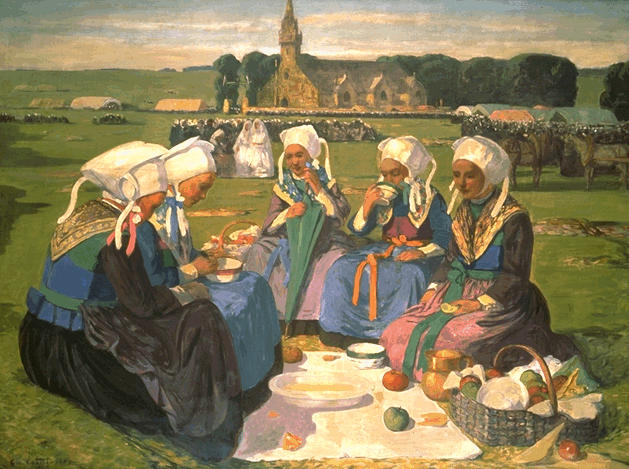
Cottet's 1903 painting of women in Plougastel-Daoulas

=== La Forest-Landerneau ===
Some stairs separate the upper part of the cemetery in La Forest-Landerneau from the lower section and these are decorated with Dorė sculptures of a saint in bishop's attire and Catherine of Alexandria.

=== Plouvien ===
The Dorė atelier worked on a statue of Saint Jaoua for the fountain by Plouvien's Saint Jaoua chapel.

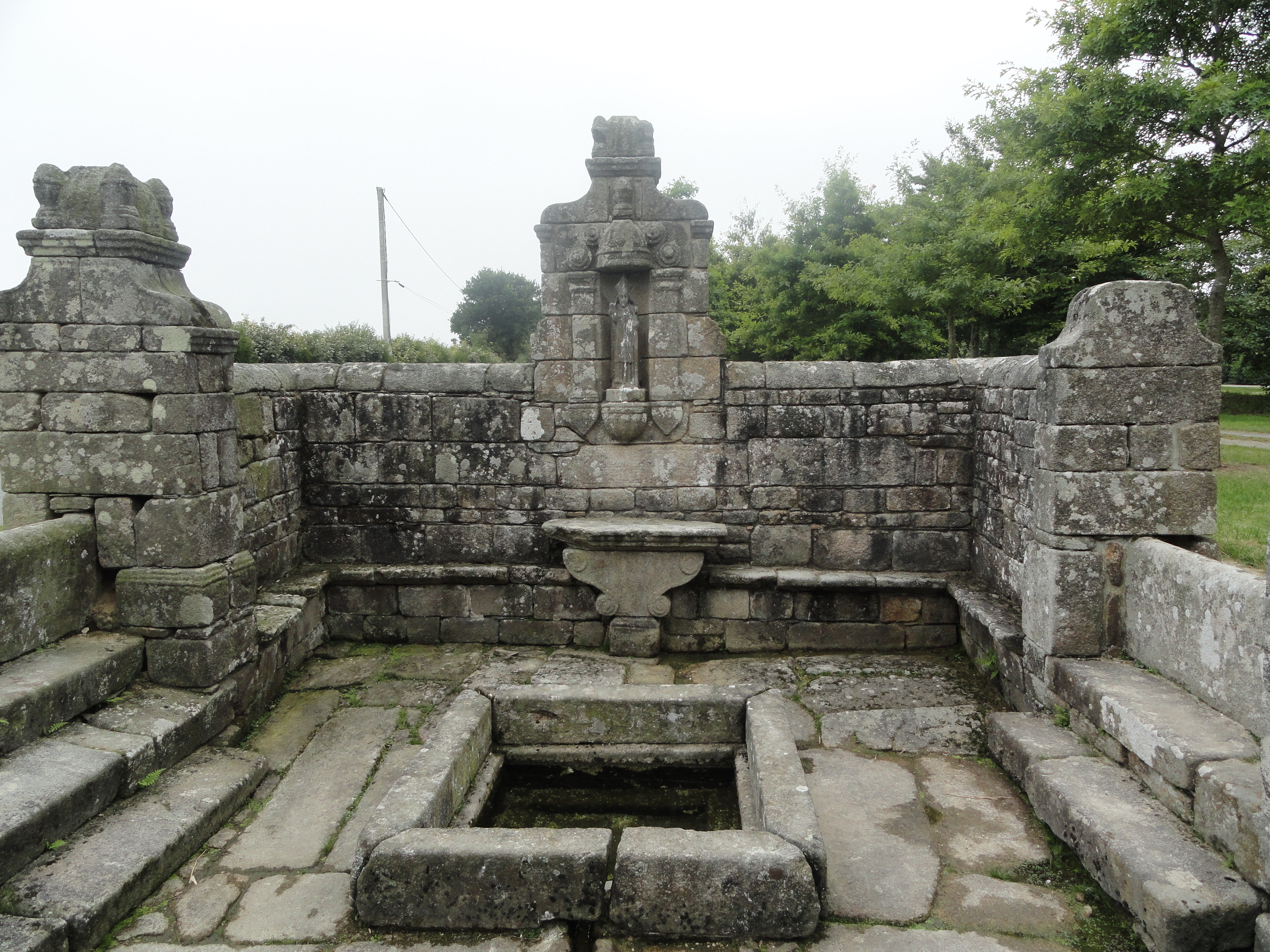
The Saint Jaoua chapel fountain

=== Le Conquet ===
There is a statue of Saint Francis of Assisi in the choir area of the Ėglise Saint Derrien in Le Conquet.

=== Tréflévénez ===
In Tréflévénez, in the Église Saint-Pierre there is a Doré sculpture of Saint Margaret and the dragon. It is located on the south wall of the south aisle.

=== Le Tréhou ===
In the south porch of the Sainte-Pitère parish church in Le Tréhou, the Doré atelier executed statues of Saint Peter, Saint Andrew, John the Evangelist and Saint Thomas as well as the Christ sauveur which is placed on a pedestal.

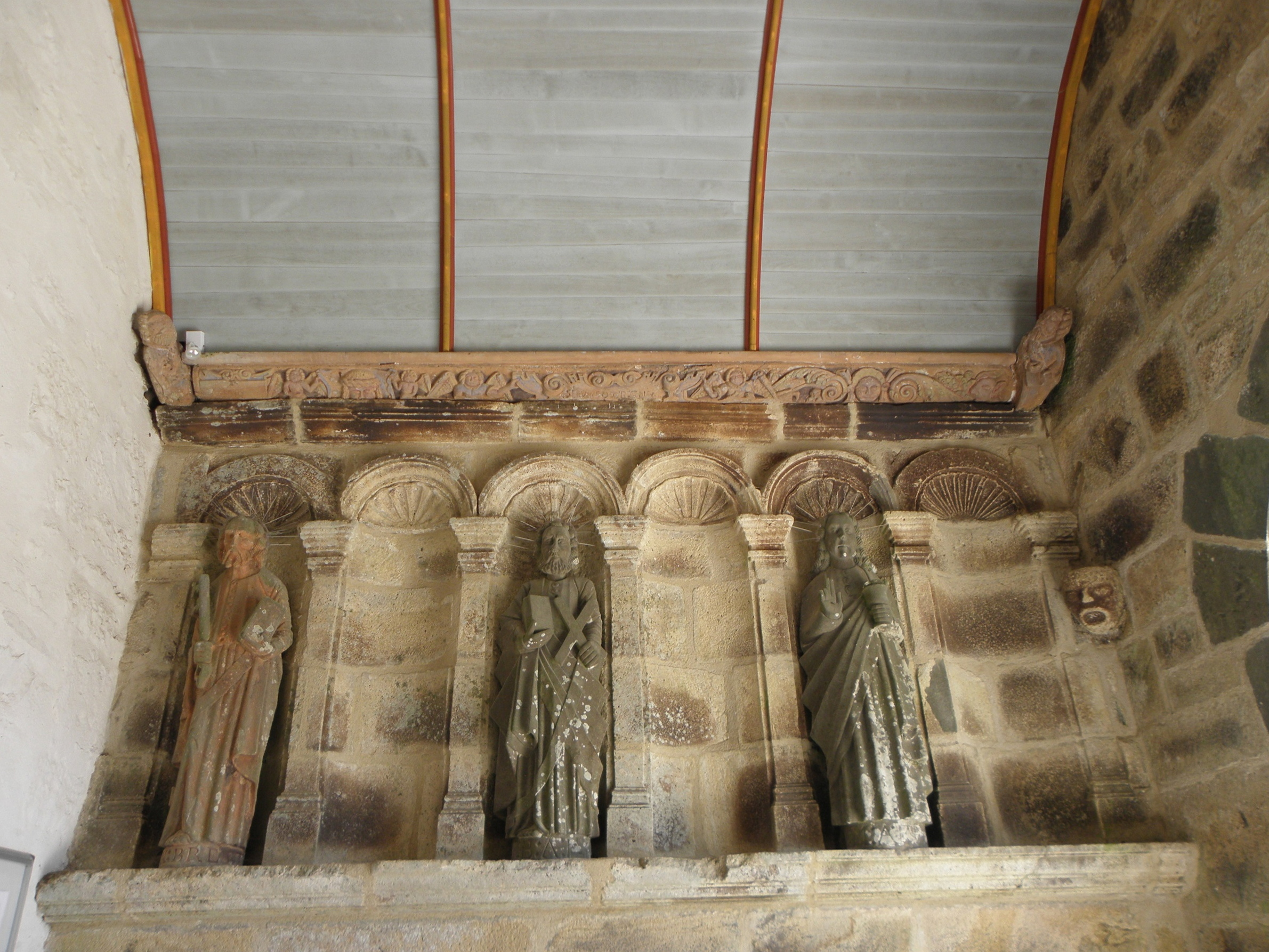
Statues in the Église Sainte-Pitère at Le Tréhou

=== Lannilis ===
In 1630, Doré worked on the calvary at Kerosven in Lannilis. He sculpted Christ on the cross and statues of John the Baptist, John the Evangelist and the Virgin Mary.

=== Le Folgoët ===
For the Le Folgoët Croix du Champ de foire, the Dorė atelier carved the crucifix and a shield with depictions of Jesus' pierced and bleeding hands, feet and heart, and for the parish church Doré executed a statue of "Christ souffrant".

=== Dirinon ===
There is a calvary called "La Croix-Rouge" at Dirinon which has Doré statues of Christ on the cross and back to back statues depicting John the Evangelist /Saint Roch and the Virgin Mary/Saint Sebastian.

=== Logonna-Daoulas ===
Outside the "Chapelle Saint-Jean-Baptiste" at Logonna-Daoulas, there is a fountain dating to 1644 with a sculpture depicting John the Baptist which is attributed to Doré. Nearby, another fountain, the "Fontaine de saint Jean l'Évangéliste" with its sculpture depicting John the Evangelist dates to 1647 and is also attributed to Doré. Inside the chapel itself, the polychrome statue of St. Laurent is also a Doré work. In the same area of Logonna-Daoulas it was Doré who was responsible for the Croix de Ruliver and the Croix de Cléménéhy. See various photographs below. In 1647 Doré executed a statue of John the Baptist for a niche in a nearby fountain at Goelet-ar-C'hoat.

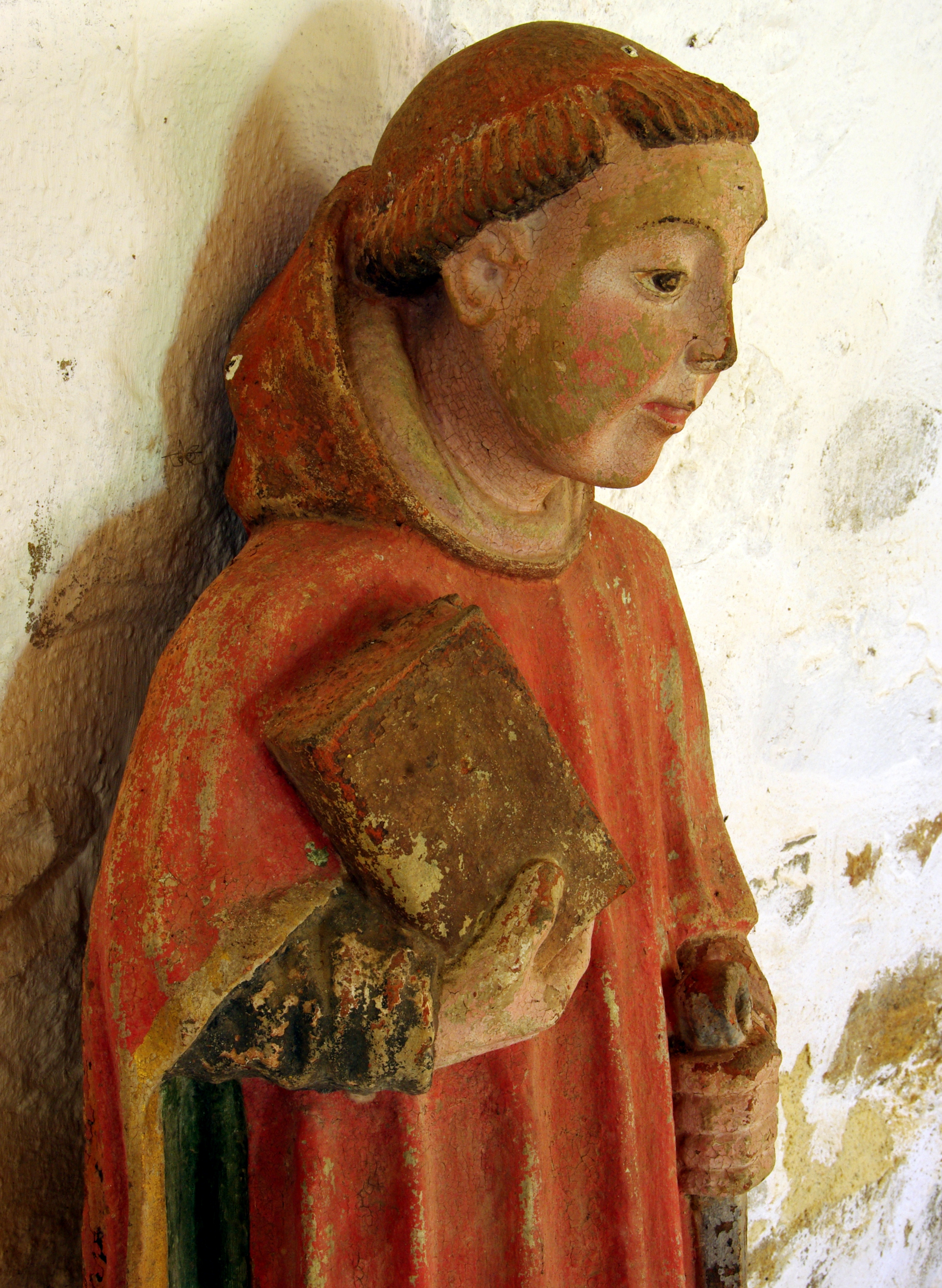
The polychromed statue of St Laurent in the Logonna-Daoulas Chapelle Saint-Jean-Baptiste

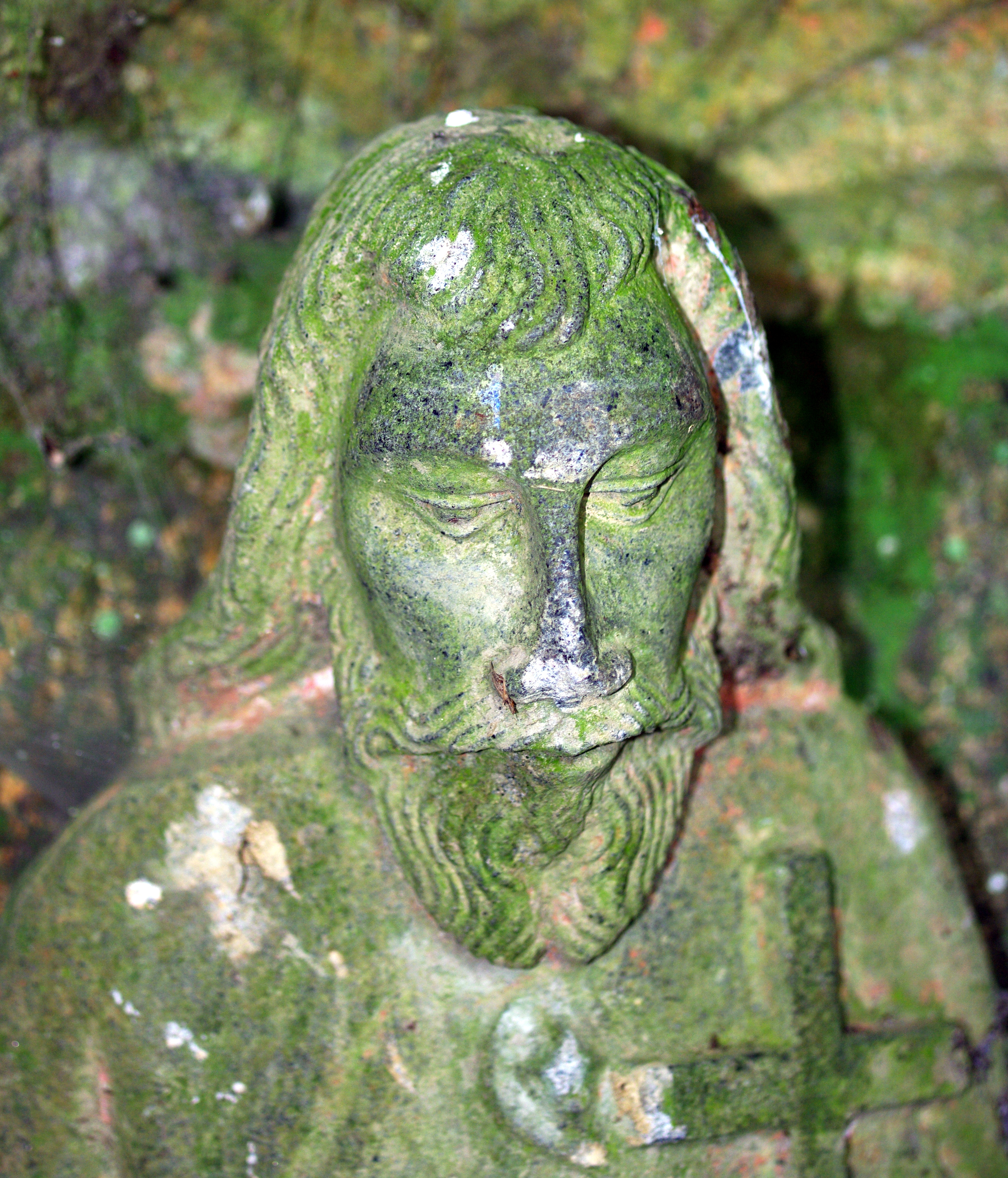
Statue of John the Baptist on the fountain outside the Logonna-Daoulas Chapelle Saint-Jean-Baptiste

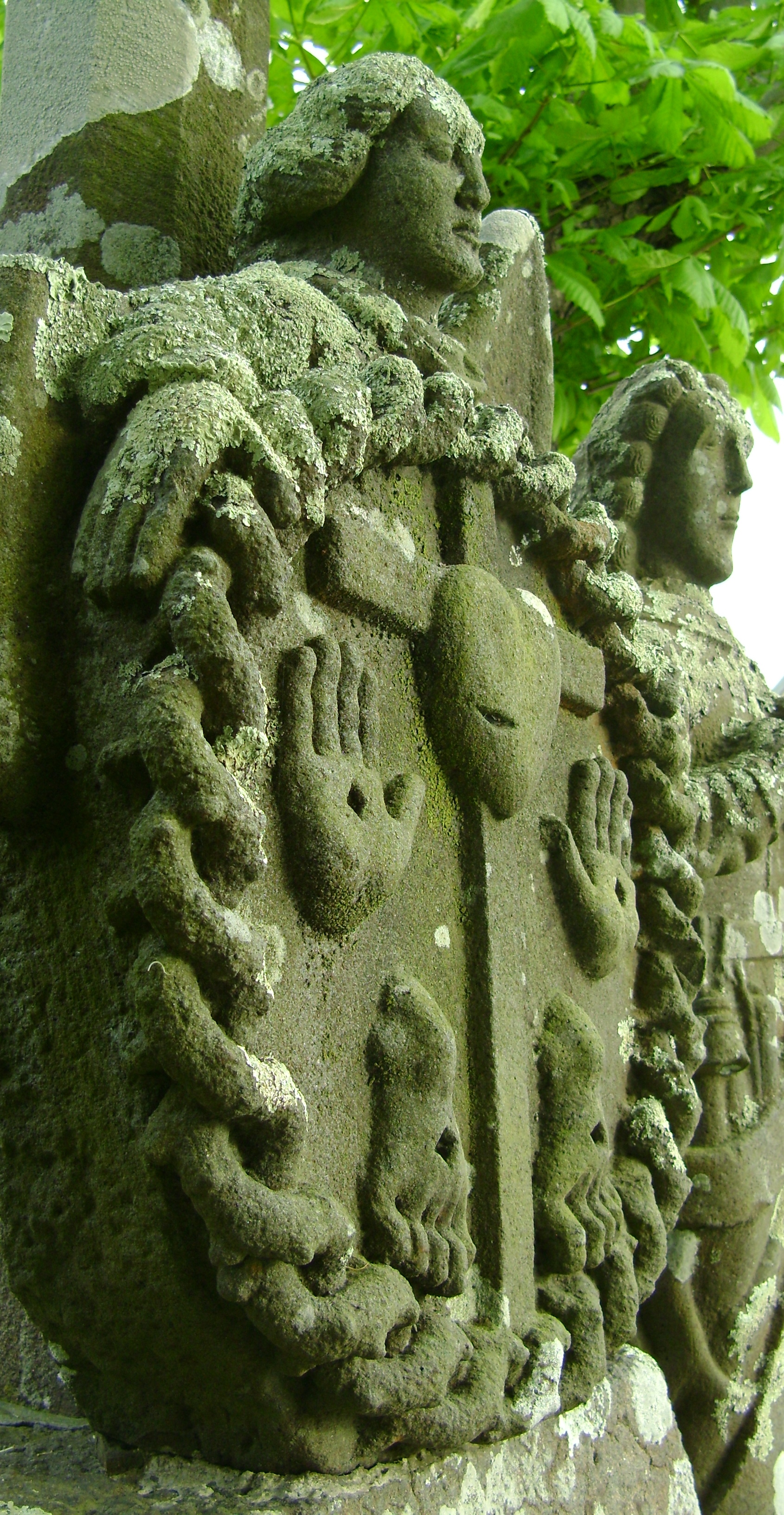
Calvaire de Ruliver. Shows an angel and depictions of the five wounds suffered by Jesus including that in his side

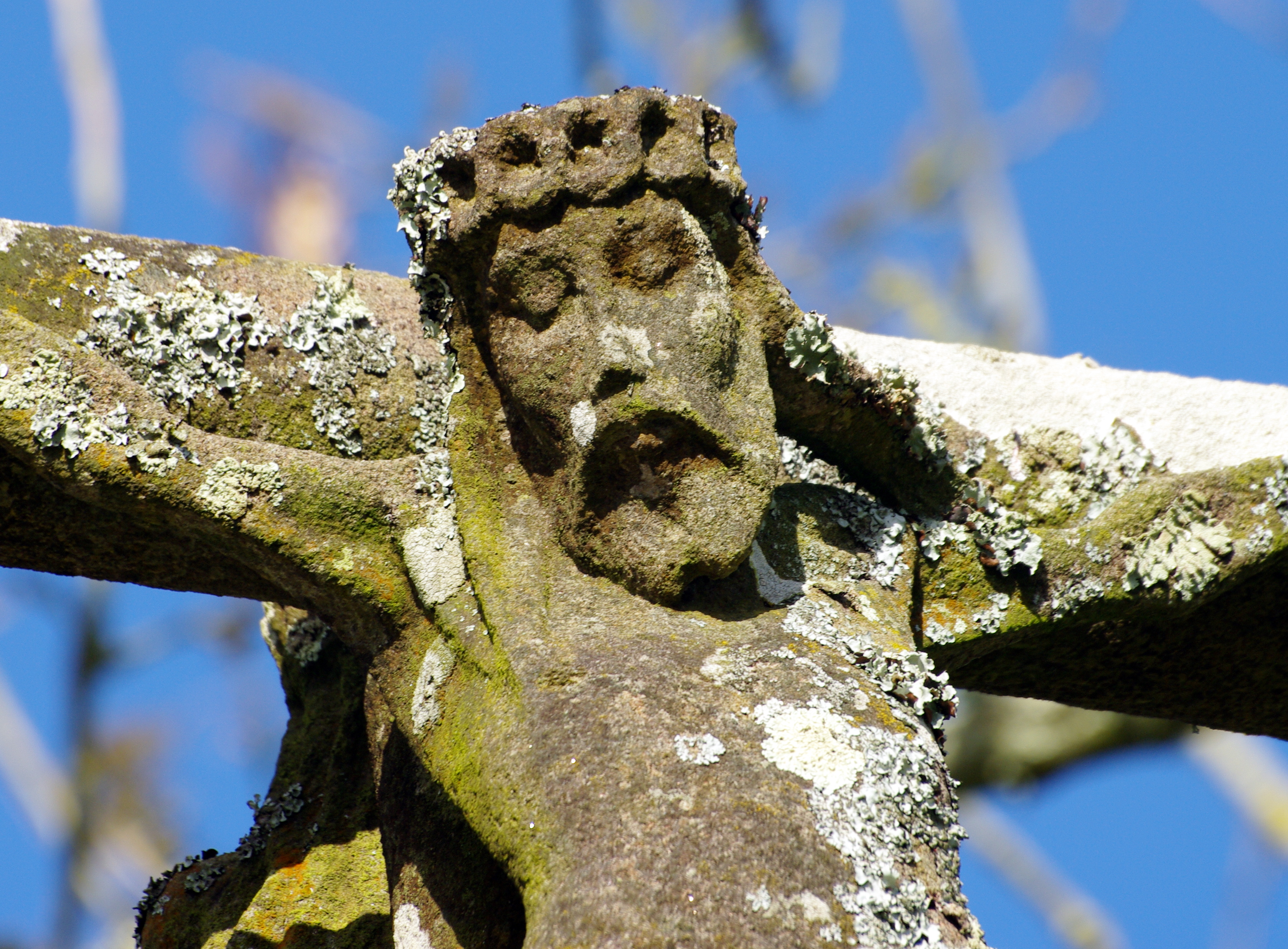
Croix de Cléménéhy

=== Saint-Méen ===
The "Coz-Castel" calvary dates to 1632 and was originally located in the village of Guennéroc but was given to Saint-Méen in 1879. It carries statues by Doré of John the Evangelist and the Virgin Mary, apart from Jesus on the Cross.

=== Saint-Renan ===
On the Saint-Renan "Croix de Quillimerrien" is a statue of the Virgin Mary which is attributed to the Dorė atelier.

=== "La croix du Cranou" ===
This 4-metre-high (13 ft) calvary in the Cranou forest near Hanvec has sadly lost its cross. It dates to 1627. It had served the Saint-Conval chapel which is now in ruins.

=== Irvillac ===
At Irvillac there is a fountain by the Notre-Dame-de-Lorette chapel with a calvary by Doré. This dates to 1644 and whilst the figure of Christ has been mutilated and lost both arms and legs, the back to back ("géminées") statues of the Virgin Mary/Saint Peter and John the Evangelist/Saint Yves have survived, as have the depictions of the two robbers crucified with Jesus. The calvary is known as the "Coatnan" calvary. At Irvillac, Doré also worked on the calvary by the Locmélar chapel and also worked on a statue of Saint John in the sacristy of the Irvillac Église Saint-Pierre.

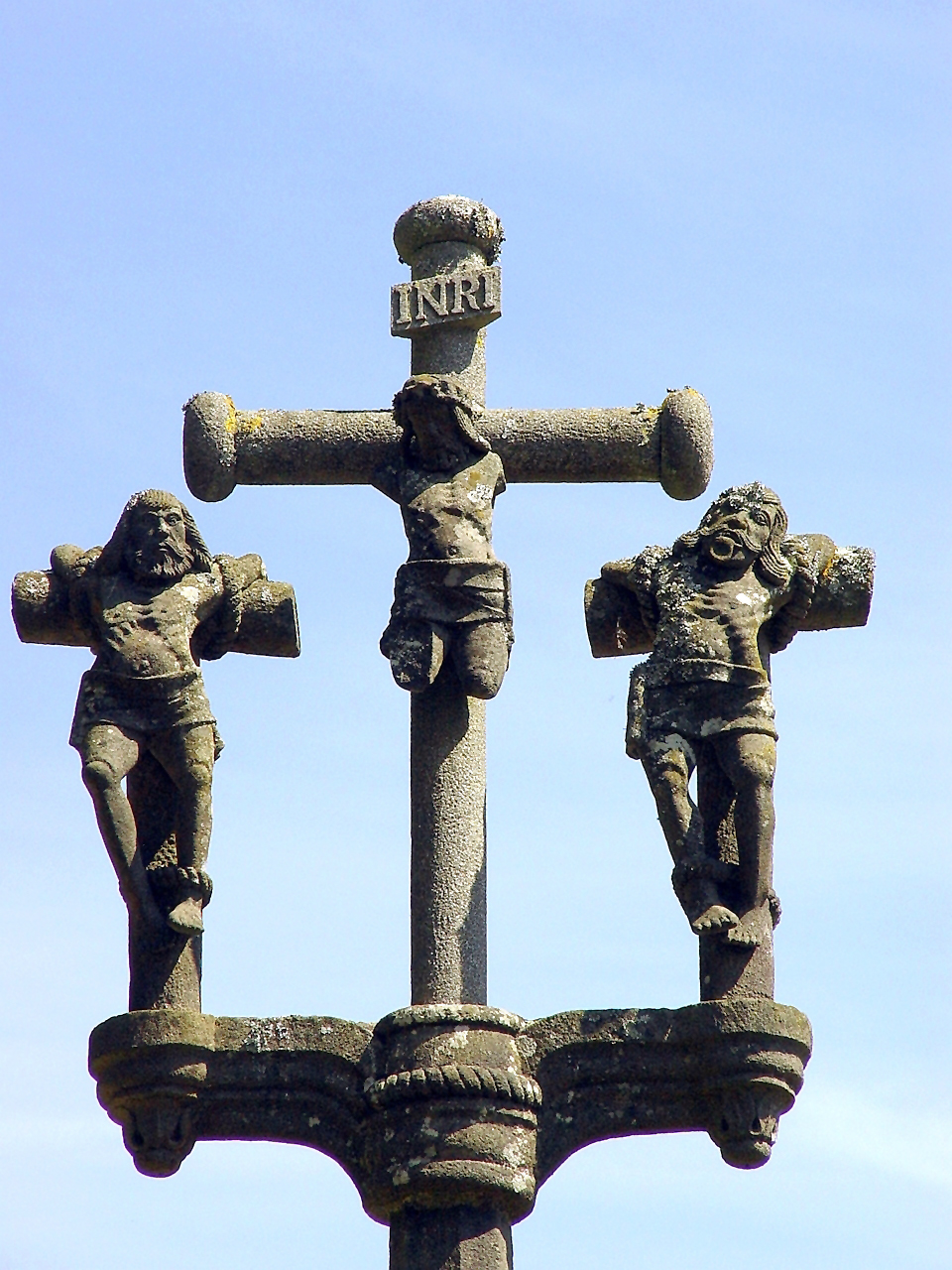
The figure of Christ and the good and bad robbers. Part of the Chapelle Notre-Dame-de-Lorette Calvary at Irvillac

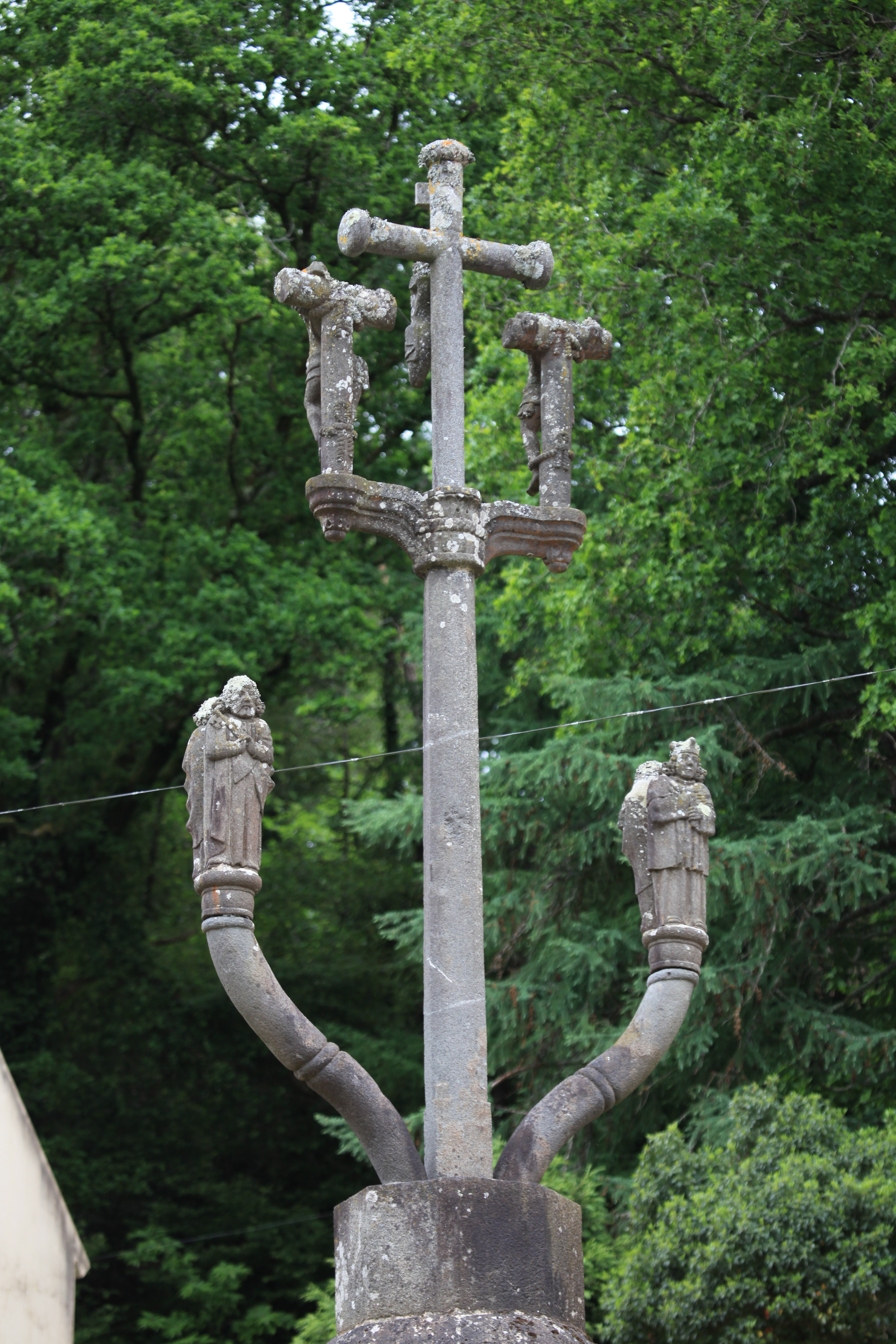
The Chapelle Notre-Dame-de-Lorette Calvary at Irvillac

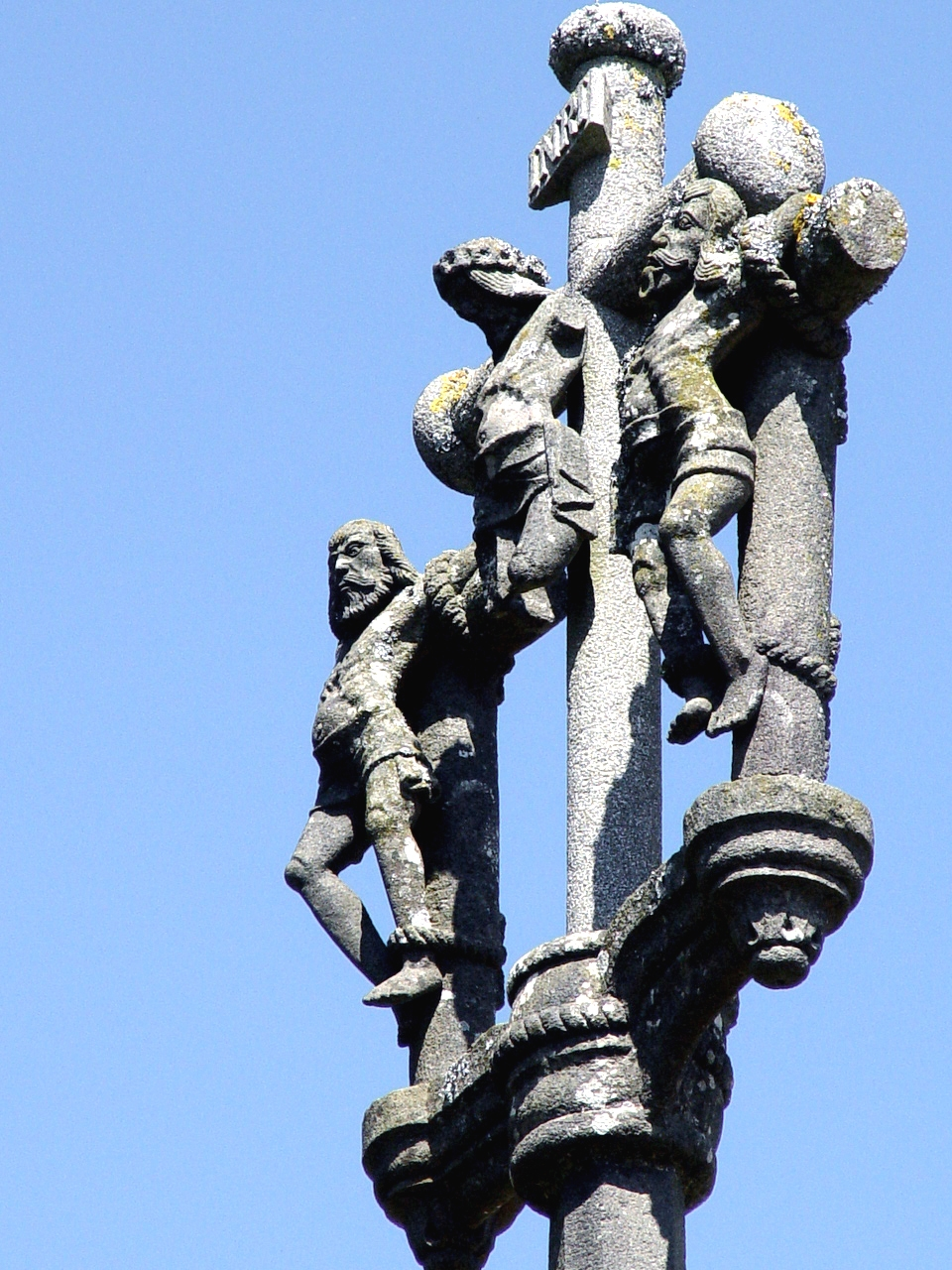
Another view of Christ and the good and bad robbers. Part of the Chapelle Notre-Dame-de-Lorette Calvary at Irvillac

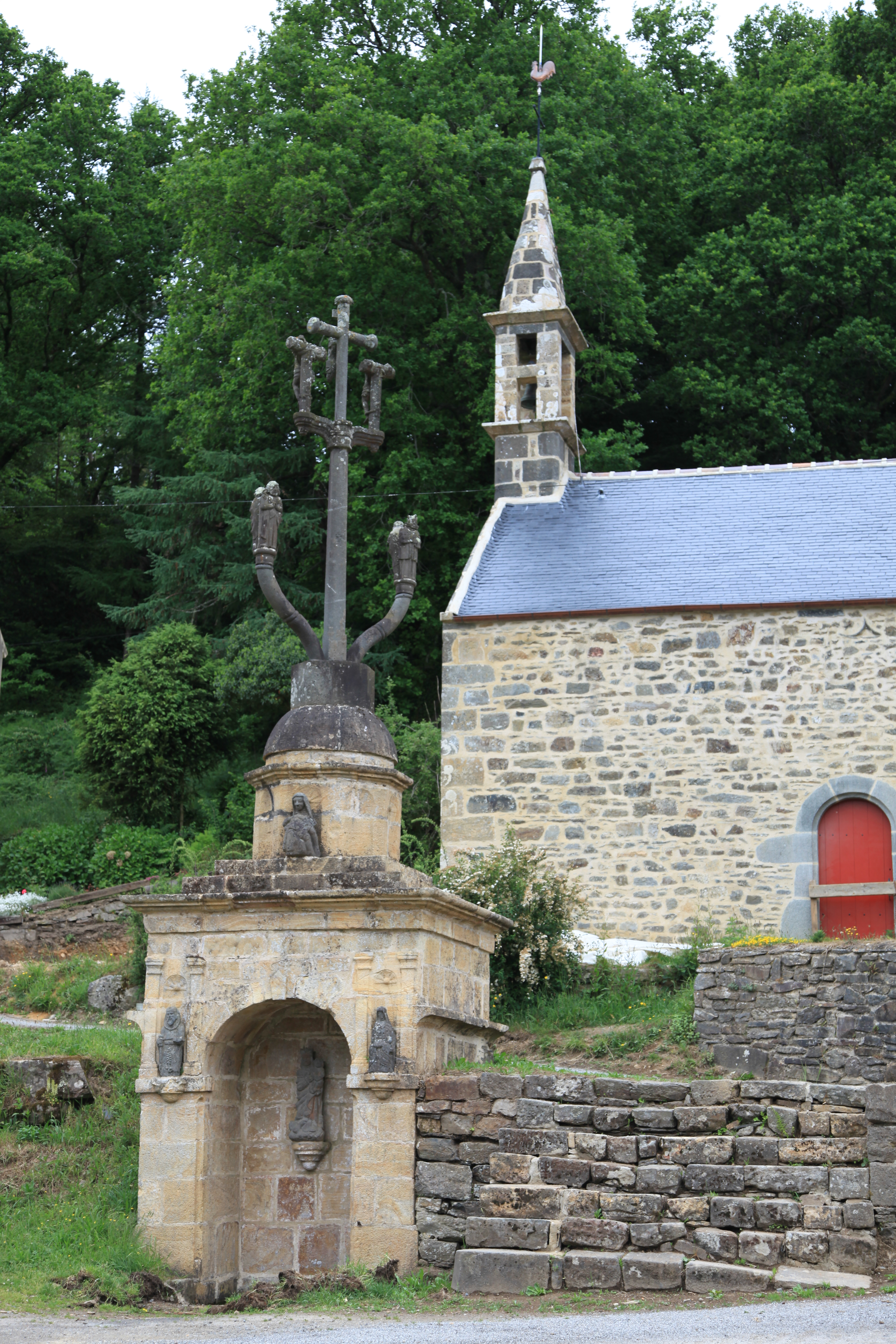
The calvary and fountain

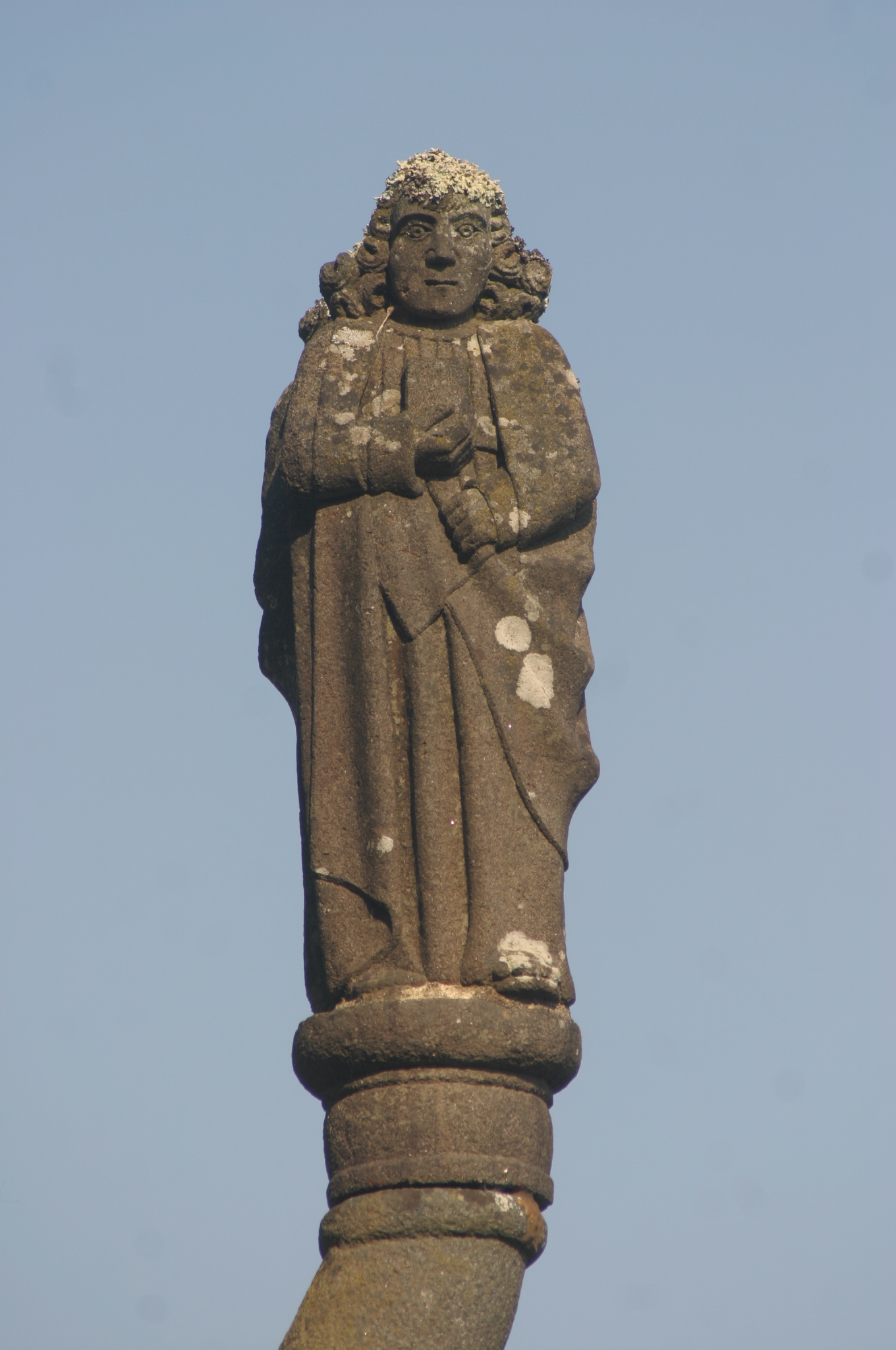
Figure on the Chapelle Notre-Dame-de-Lorette Calvary at Irvillac

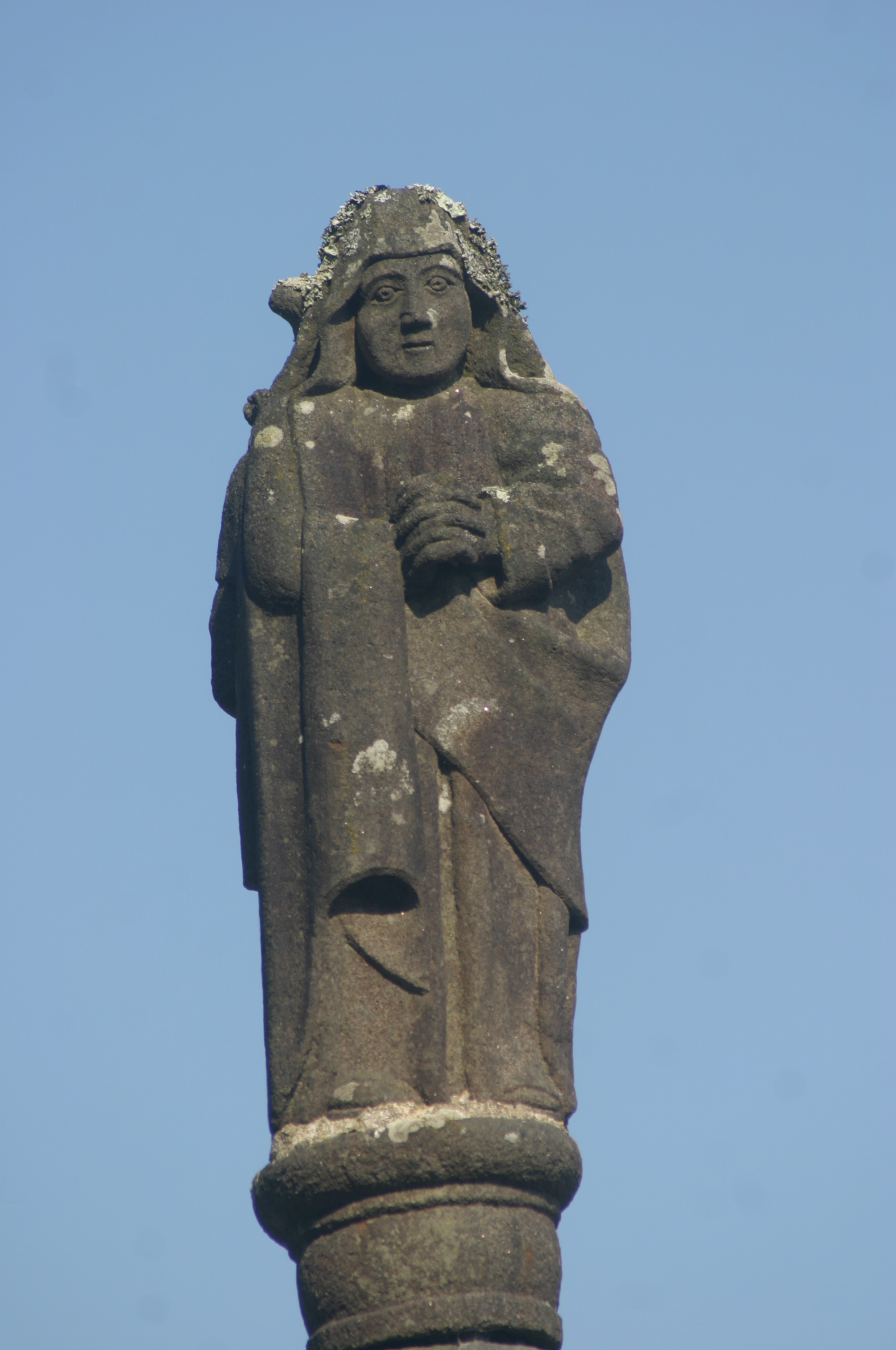
Figure on the Chapelle Notre-Dame-de-Lorette Calvary at Irvillac

There is another Doré calvary at Clécnunan near Irvillac. This features Christ on the cross, a mutilated depiction of a saint and statues "géminées" of the Virgin Mary and Saint Peter which are also badly damaged.

=== Saint-Urbain, Finistère ===
This calvary erected in 1550, was restored by Doré in 1630 and is located by the Chapelle Notre-Dame in Trévarn, Saint-Urbain. It has depictions both of Christ on the Cross and Christ aux liens (Christ sitting awaiting his crucifixion). Many calvaries in Brittany were erected to celebrate the end of an outbreak of plague and the shaft of the Trévarn Calvary is decorated with small extrusions or bumps intended to mimic the boils which were a sign of the bubonic plague ("bubons"). Another calvary near Saint Urbain was restored by Doré in 1630 and that is the calvary at Quinquis. Erected in 1518 and having a height of 5 metres, the depiction of Christ on the Cross is backed by a Pietà.

== Works by Doré in the Arrondissement of Morlaix ==
Doré is attributed with the following works in the Morlaix arrondissement.

=== Cléder ===
The Dorė atelier executed the crucifix on the Croix de Kerzuoc'h in Cléder.

=== Plougonven ===
Doré completed a statue of Saint Joseph for the Plougonven parish church, the Église Saint-Yves. It can be seen in the north part of the nave. The statue had originally been in the Kerloaguen chapel. The saint holds a palm leaf in one hand and a closed book in the other.

=== Plougourvest ===
In Plougourvest, the Doré atelier executed a statue of the Virgin Mary for the exterior of the south porch of the Église Saint-Pierre and the statues Christ glorieux and that to Saint James the Greater inside the porch.

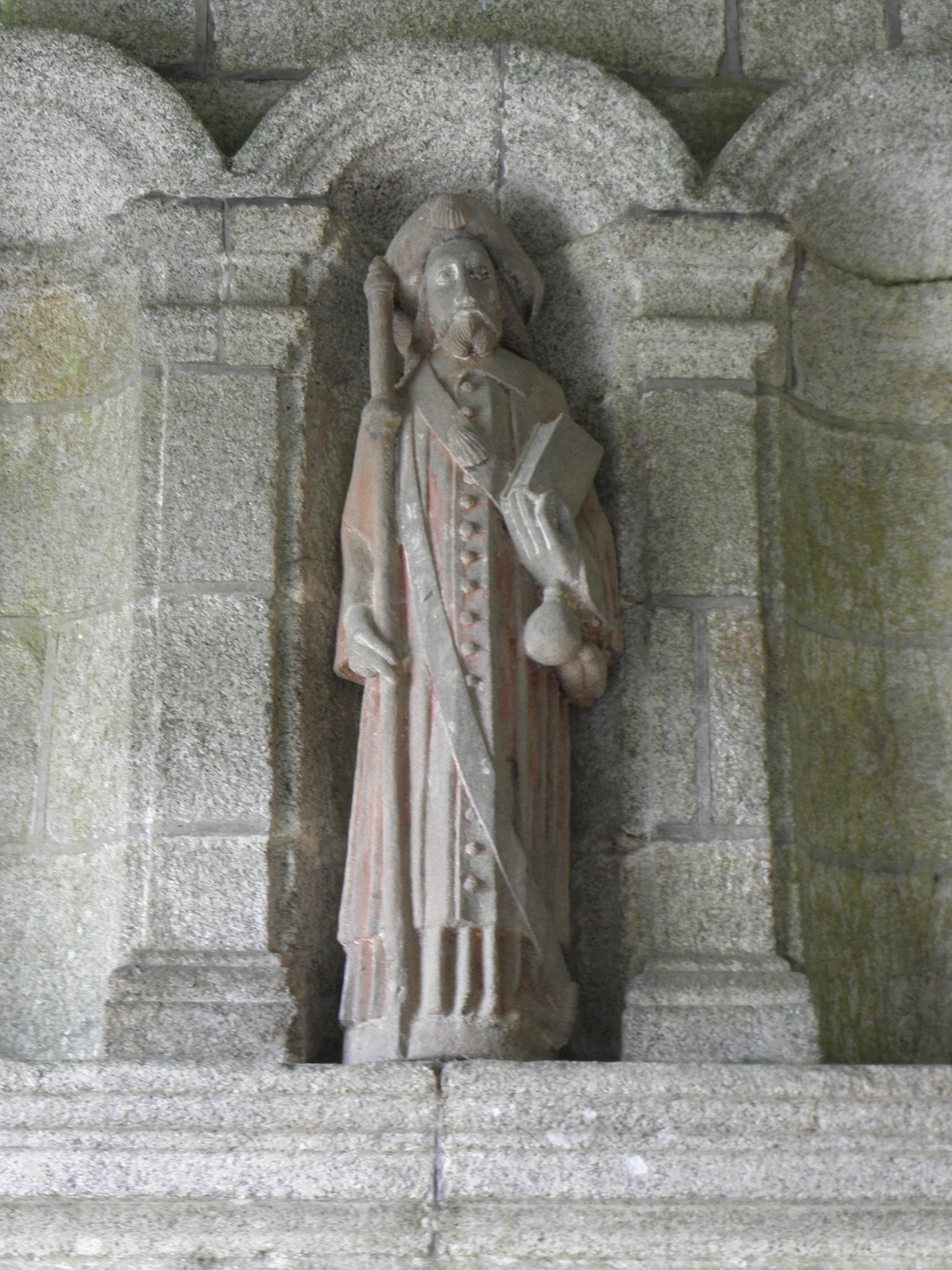
Statue of James the Greater

=== Guiclan ===
In the south porch of the Guiclan parish church is a Doré sculpture of Christ on the cross which came from Kerizamel. At Kerlaviou there is a badly mutilated calvary which dates to 1622 and has been attributed to Doré, and at Pen-ar-Feunteun there is another Doré calvary. This dates to 1642 and was restored in 1889 by Larhantec. The back-to-back statues depict John the Evangelist reversed with an unidentified saint and the Virgin Mary reversed with Saint Catherine.

=== Pleyben ===
The 1625 calvary in Pleyben depicts Jesus on the cross and below him John the Evangelist and the Virgin Mary. In 1929, Saint Yves and Saint Geneviève were added as well as a sculpture of St Edern riding a stag, known as the "Kroaz-Edern" calvary. In the porch of the Église Saint Germain in Pleyben are statues of the apostles of which Doré sculpted that of James the Greater and John the Evangelist. There are also the remains of a calvary by the Dorė atelier in the Église Saint Germain ossuary.

=== Saint-Sauveur, Finistère ===
The Saint-Sauveur, Finistère, cross dates to 1630 and is located in the cemetery at Kerbouzard. The calvary is 3.5 metres (11 ft) high.

=== Plounéour-Ménez ===
For the south porch of the Saint-Yves church in Plounéour-Ménez, Doré executed two statues of John the Evangelist and Saint Thomas. He also worked on part of the calvary with back-to-back statues of the Virgin Mary and Saint Peter and John the Evangelist and Saint Paul. The atelier also worked on the Kersimonet cross executing a statue of the Virgin Mary with child. Finally in Plounéour-Ménez, the Dorė atelier are credited with execution of a calvary at the "manoir du Penhoat". On the fountain there Saint Francis of Assisi and Saint James the Greater's statues are all that remain of a calvary.

=== Enclos paroissial de Saint-Thégonnec ===
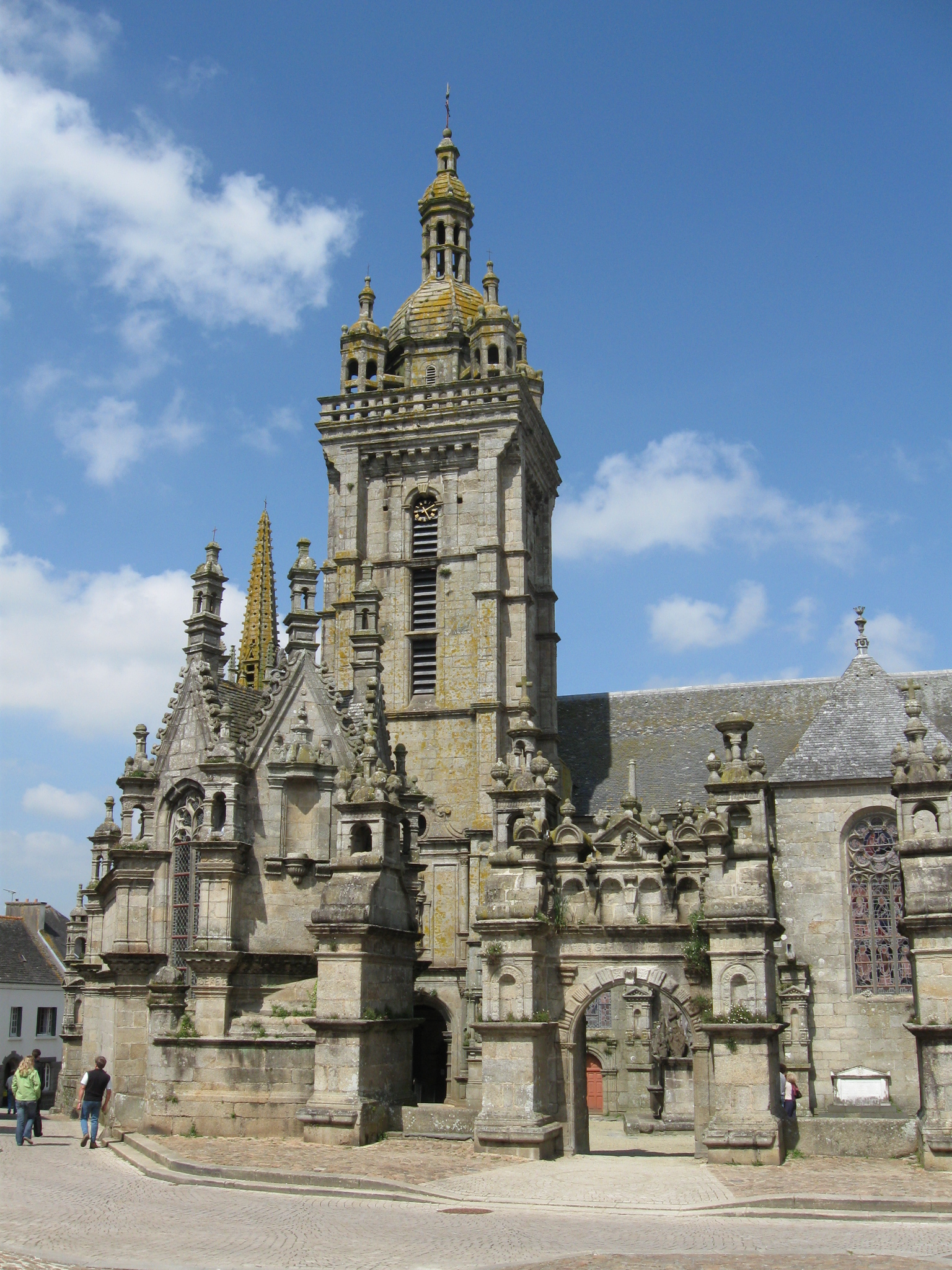
Vue générale de l’enclos paroissial de Saint-Thégonnec

This is one of Finistère's most visited sights. The enclos at Saint-Thégonnec, surrounded by a retaining wall (mur d’enceint), comprises a grand entrance (porte triomphale), an ossuary, a 7-metre-high (23 ft) calvary and the parish church of Notre-Dame. Doré's statue of St John inside this church dates to 1625 and is one of the rare occasions when Doré signed his work

"Faict l'an 1625/R. Doré ma faict/J. Mazé Jeanne Inizan ma faict faire"

Inside the church Doré also carved the statues in the belltower porch, this in 1625. The top of the calvary has a cross depicting Jesus whilst the crosses of the two robbers are placed on two columns rising up from the base of the calvary. Four angels surround Jesus' cross collecting his blood in chalices. Two do so from the wounds to his heart and hands and the other two collect the blood from his feet. On the first crosspiece (croisillion) are statues of two cavaliers on horseback, one of whom, Saint Longinus, was the soldier who pierced Jesus' side with a lance. These stand on either side of the reverse side of the cross which depicts Christ leaning on the column where he was whipped ("Christ à la colonne"). On the next crosspiece are statues (geminées or back to back) of John the Evangelist and Saint Yves and the Virgin Mary and Saint Peter these on either side of a depiction of Mary with child and a Pietà. On the base of the calvary are representations of different scenes from the Passion and the Resurrection; the descent from the cross, the burial and the resurrection. We then have sculptures showing Jesus being tied up, Jesus blindfolded and being manhandled by two soldiers, Jesus being whipped, an "Ecce Homo", Pontius Pilate washing his hands after passing sentence on Jesus, Jesus meeting Veronica whilst carrying the Cross, and in a small niche, a statue of St Thégonnec and his cart. All this was the work of "Le Maître de Saint-Thégonnec" in 1610 and several years later Doré was to add the depiction of Christ being mocked. The figures wear the dress of the reign of Henry IV. Doré also worked on the nearby "Calvaire de Broustou" in 1632 and the "Croix de Pennavern". The "Calvaire de Broustou" is 4 metres high and the Pennavern cross has a height of 5 metres and dates to 1647. Doré also worked on the south porch of Saint-Thégonnec's Église Notre-Dame. There is also a Doré sculpture at Le Kelf where there is a depiction of the Virgin Mary in a small niche. This dates to 1652. Another calvary at Coslen was restored by Doré in 1622.

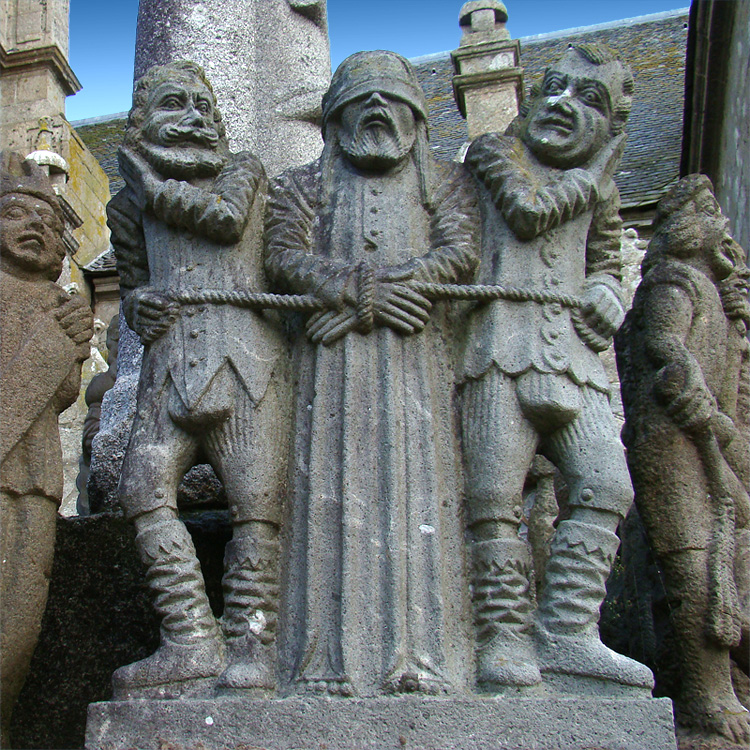
Doré's contribution to the calvary; Christ being mocked. Christ aux outrages

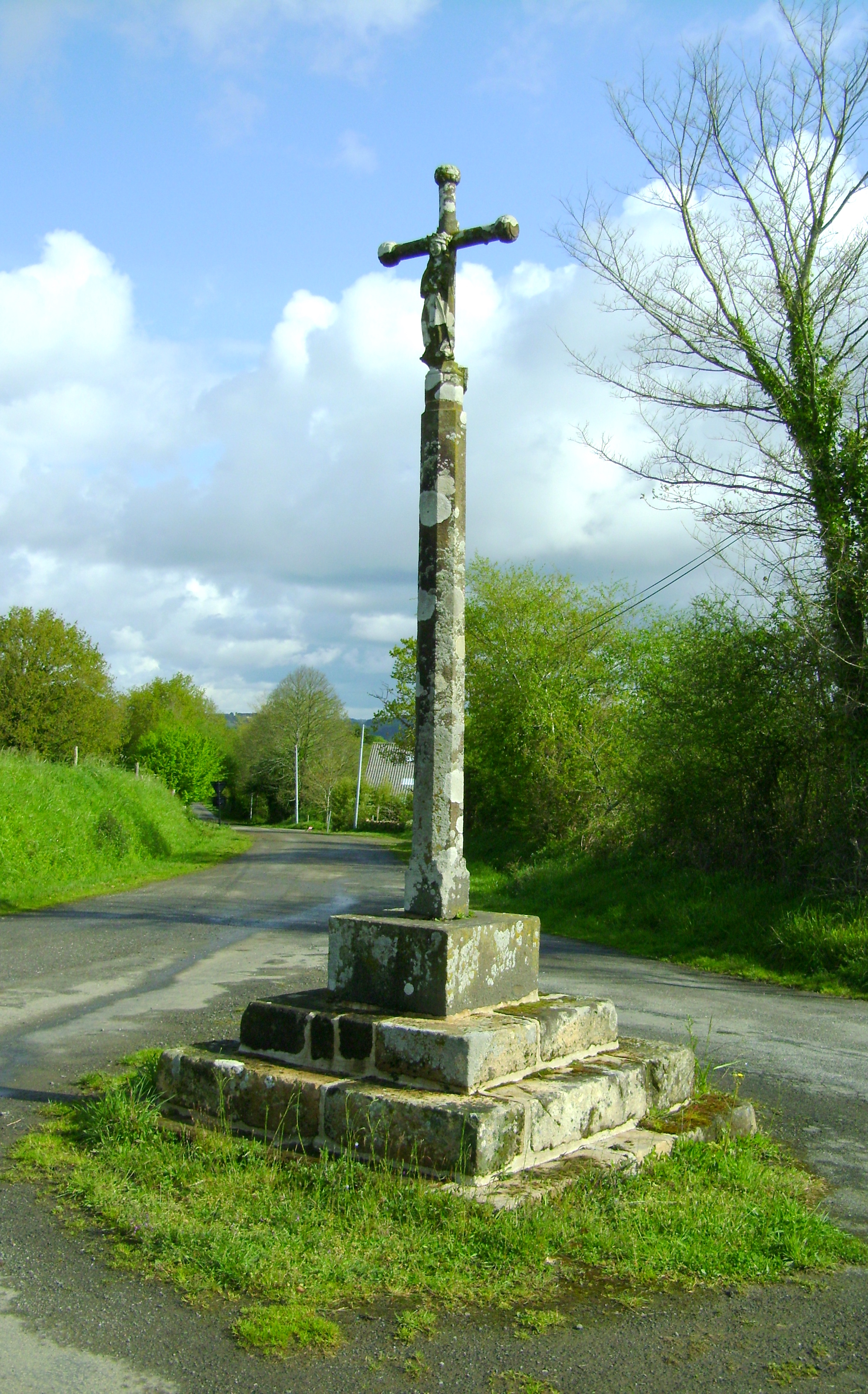
The Croix de Pennavern.

=== Saint-Servais ===
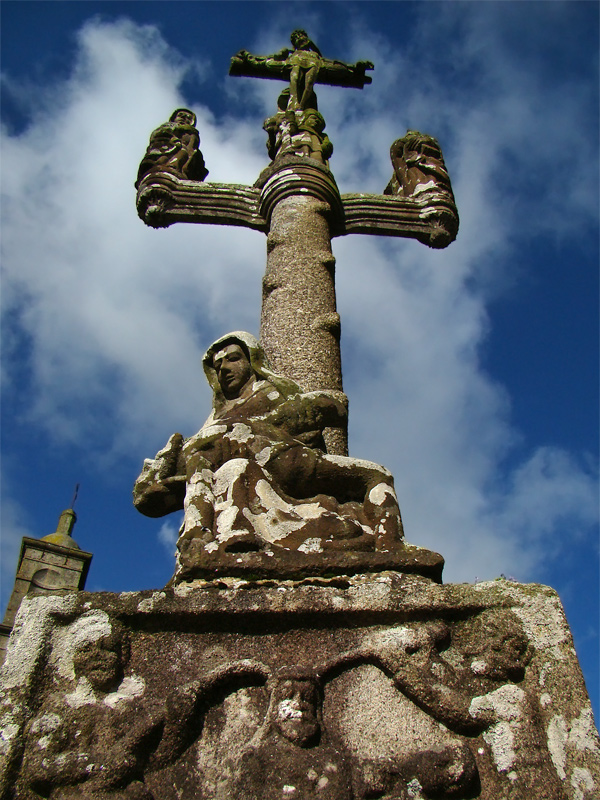
The calvary at the Saint-Servais enclos

The enclos at Saint-Servais in Finistère is known for the quality of its bell tower and ossuary. Saint-Servais had been part of Plounéventer but became an independent commune in 1792. Of the sculptures on the calvary only the crucifix and the Christ aux liens are by Doré. Also at Saint-Servais the "Croix de Brėtiès known as the Croas-Vossoc is by Dorė. The calvary has a crucifix and a shield inscribed "IAC BRAS 1640".

=== Eglise Saint-Pierre de Pleyber-Christ ===
In the south porch of Pleyber-Christ's Saint Pierre church we see a depiction of Christ and the twelve apostles. The church has been declared a "Monument Historique" since 1914 and is rich in furnishings. The apostles appear in niches in the porch and above the door, Doré was responsible for all the statues of Jesus and the apostles. For the Kervern calvary known as the "Croix de Kervern", the Dorė atelier executed statues of the Virgin Mary and Saint Marguerite.

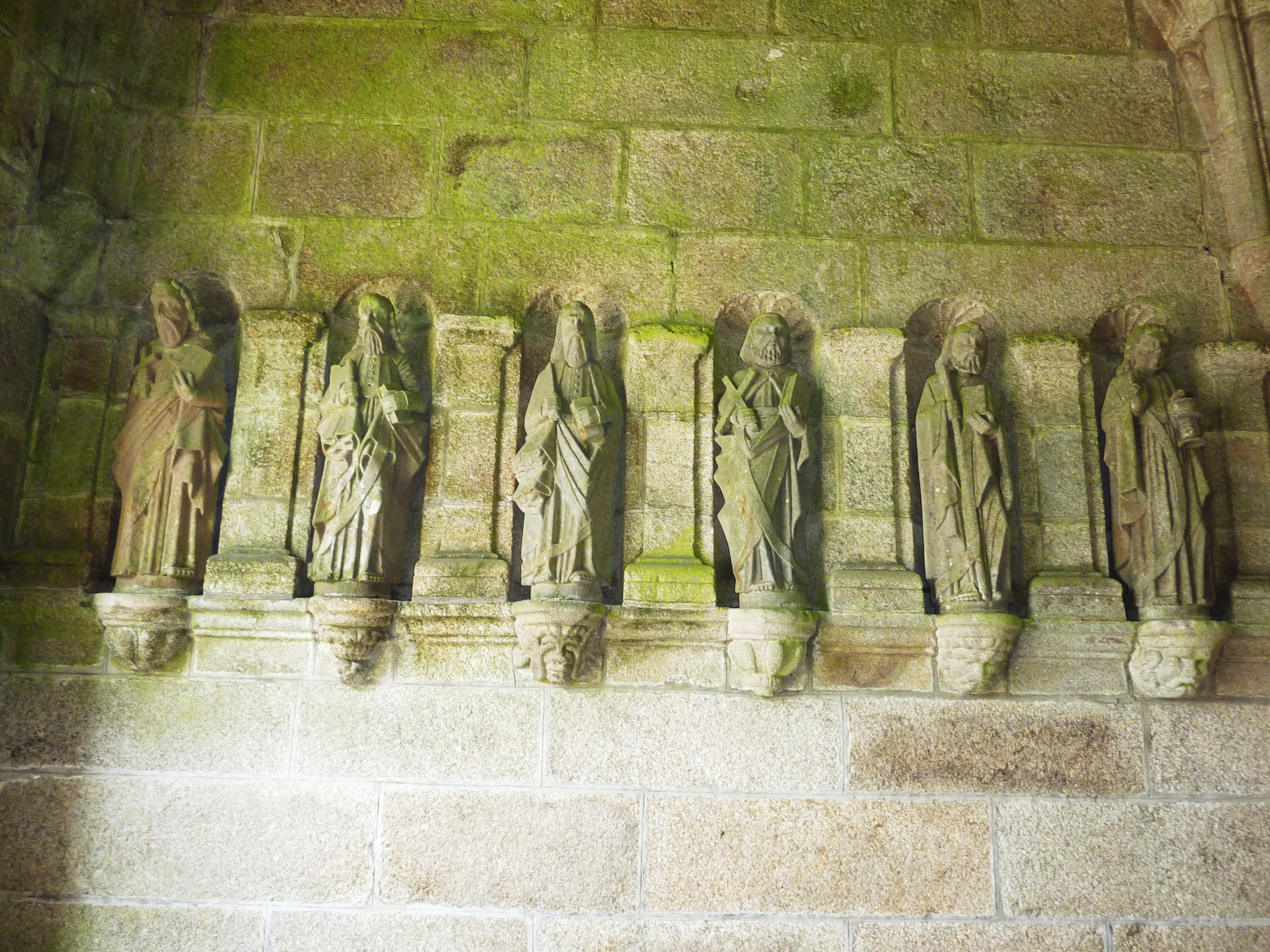
The statues of six of the apostles

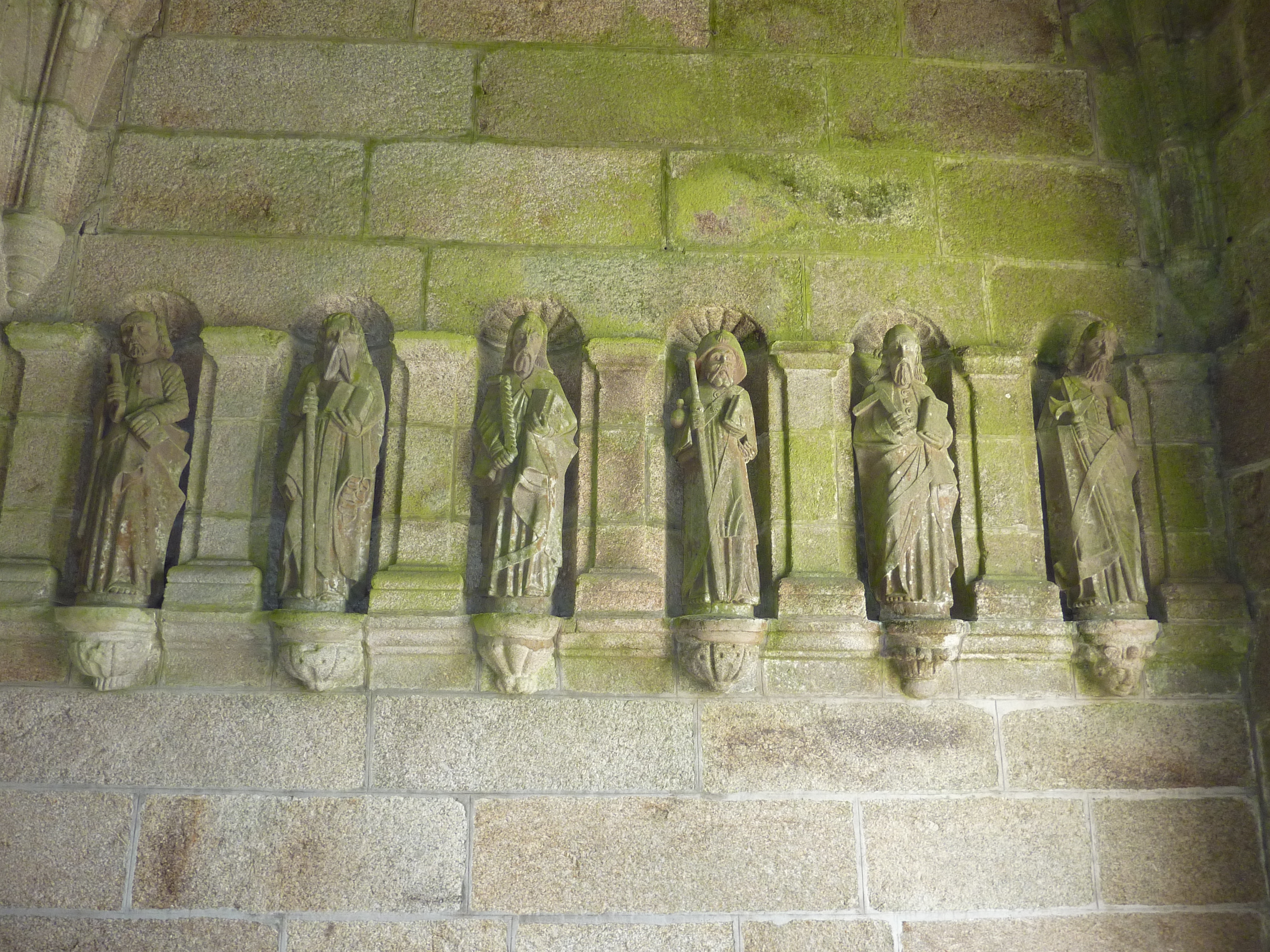
The other six apostles

=== Bodilis ===
Bodilis is one of the communes of the arrondissement of Morlaix. It lies six kilometres northwest of Landivisiau. In the "Enclos paroissial de Bodilis", the Église Notre Dame, Doré executed the statue of Notre Seigneur bénissant (Christ sauveur) which stands in the south porch as well as the Angel of the Annunciation placed in a niche in the left side buttress of that porch. In the Angel of the Annunciation composition, Dorė includes a vase of lilies which is inscribed "ECCE:ANCILLA:D(OMI)NI:FIAT:MIHI:SECVNDVM:VERBVM:TVVM". He also sculpted the elaborate hexagonal baptismal font which he decorated with sculptures of Matthew the Apostle, Mark the Apostle, God holding his dead son in his arms, St Gregory the Great, John the Evangelist, Saint Peter and the bishop St Ambrose of Milan. All the Bodilis works were carved from kersanton stone. See Bodilis Parish close. The fountain at the Pont an Ilis situated in the "Kerrous" district of Bodilis includes Doré's 120 cm sculpture of the Virgin Mary and because the sculptor used the dark stone Kersanton, it became known to local people as the "Vierge Noire" (the black virgin)

=== Lampaul-Guimiliau ===
The commune of Lampaul-Guimiliau has two calvaries attributed to Doré. One, with a height of 4 metres (13 ft), is known as the "Cosquer-Bihan" or "Croaz-Kernévez" and dates to 1621. It is a wayside cross (Croix de chemin) and thought to be one of Doré's early works. It depicts Jesus on the Cross and on the reverse depicts the Virgin Mary with child. The second located at Kerjaffrès is known as the "Croaz-Kerroc'h" and dates to 1626.

=== Commana, L'église Saint-Derrien ===
This "enclos" church in Commana has two calvaries, one by Doré dating to 1624 and being 6 metres (20 ft) high. It is carved from kersantite and the paired statues on the crosspiece below the figure of Christ on the Cross depict St Yves/ St Hervé as well as the Virgin Mary, John the Evangelist and a Pietà. It is located in the Église Saint-Derrien cemetery and is inscribed

"R: DORE: MA: FAICT"

The "Enclos paroissial de Commana" is a good example of a Breton enclos with the parish church, surrounded by a wall and an elaborate entrance. As well as the church, the enclos would include a funeral chapel or ossuary and one or more calvaries, either placed in the cemetery or just outside the church. The Saint-Derrien church has an imposing porch and bell tower and inside the church, the Sainte Anne altarpiece is one of many highly regarded works of ecclesiastical art, and the church has a noteworthy baptismal font with decoration by Honoré Alliot. The entrance to the enclos is an elaborate Arc de Triomphe. On the exterior of the south porch there is a statue of Saint Derrien which is attributed to the Dorė atelier. Some photographs of the enclos are shown here.

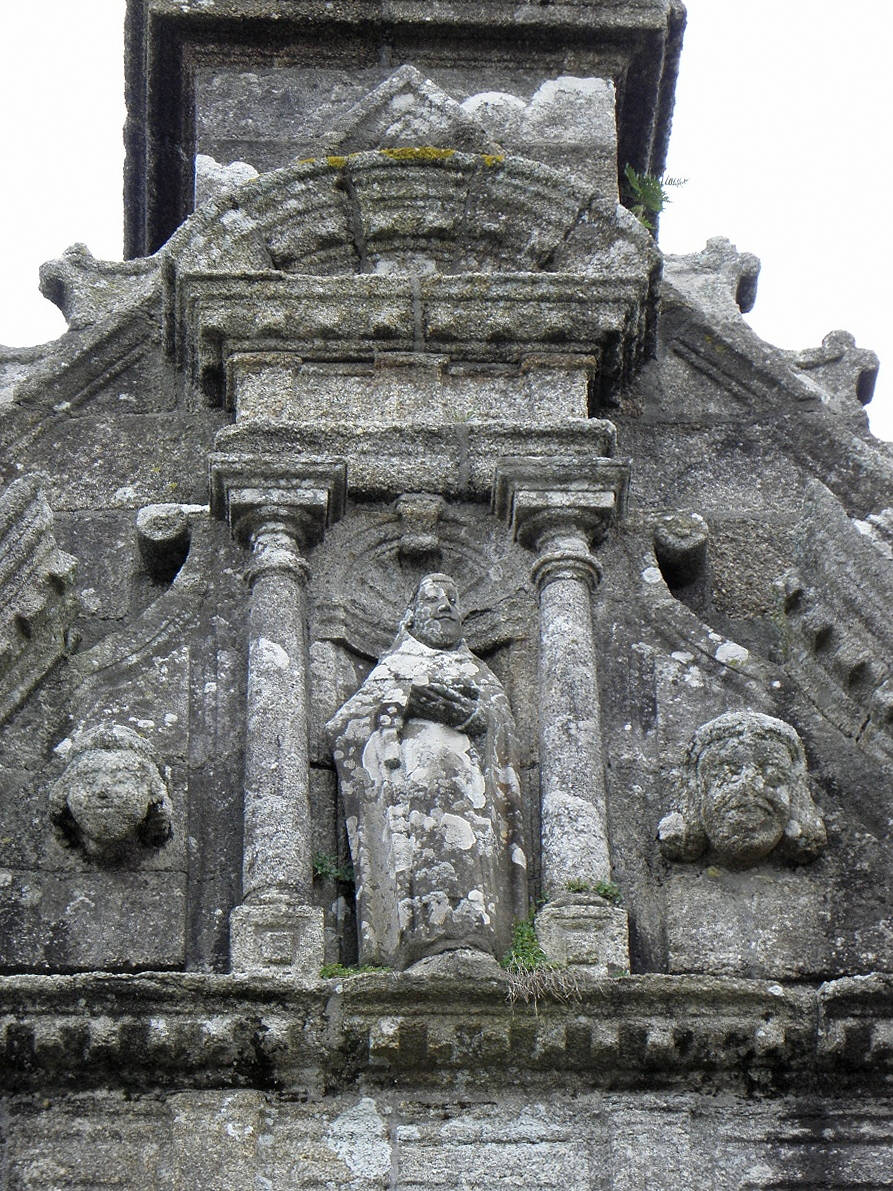
The statue of Saint Derrien over the south porch

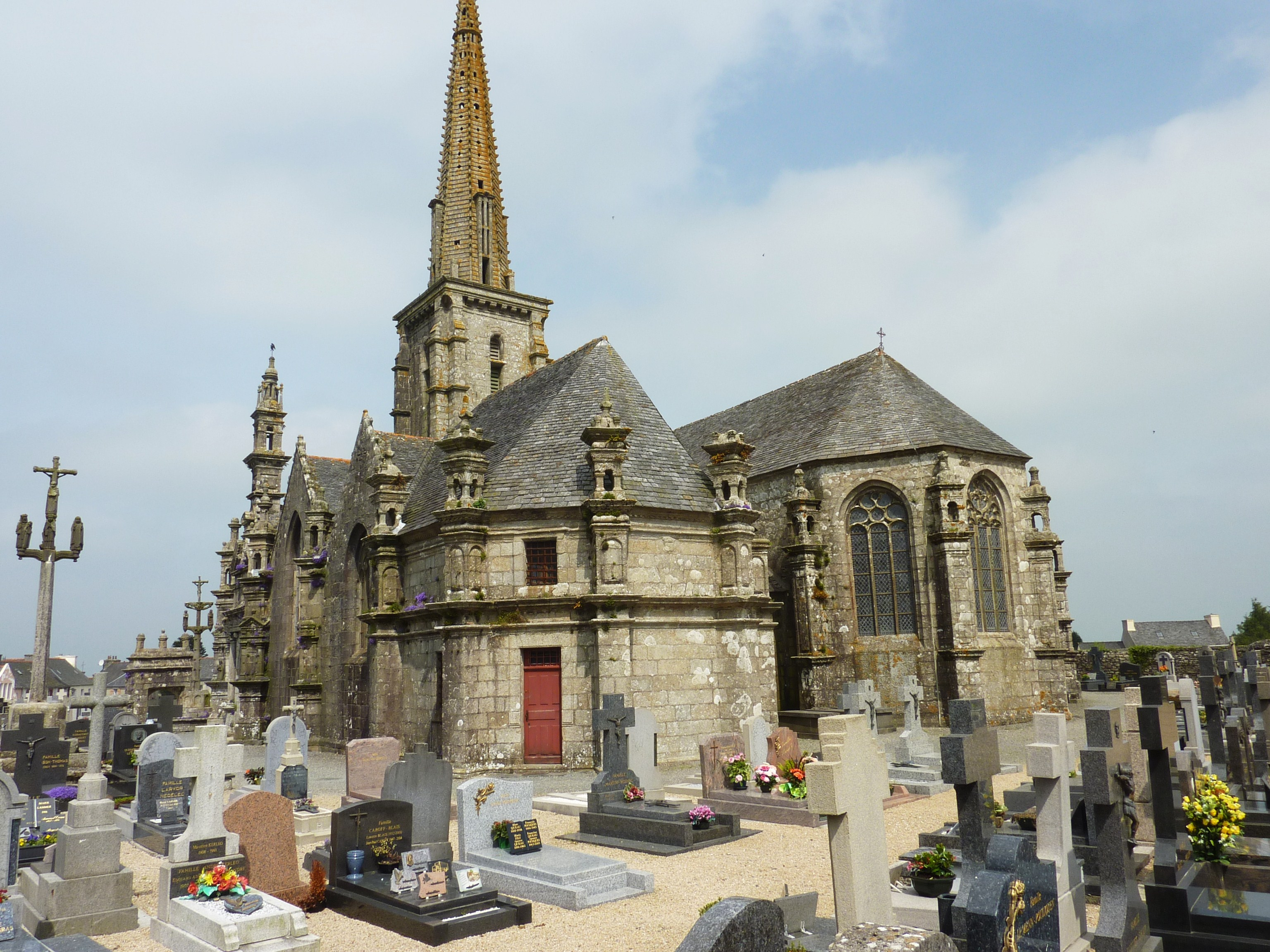
The church seen from the cemetery

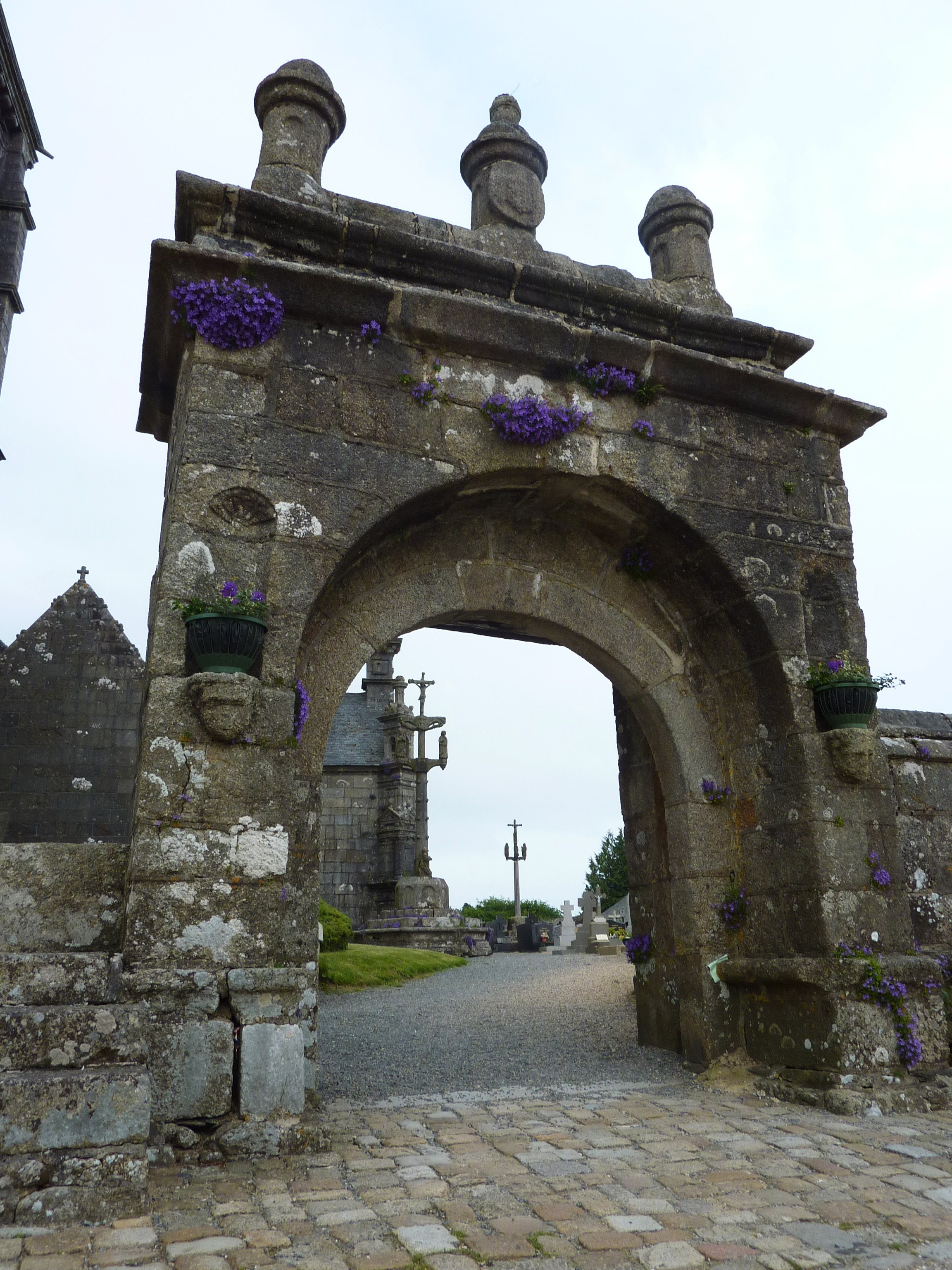
The "Arc de Triomphe"-an imposing entry to the "enclos" at Commana.

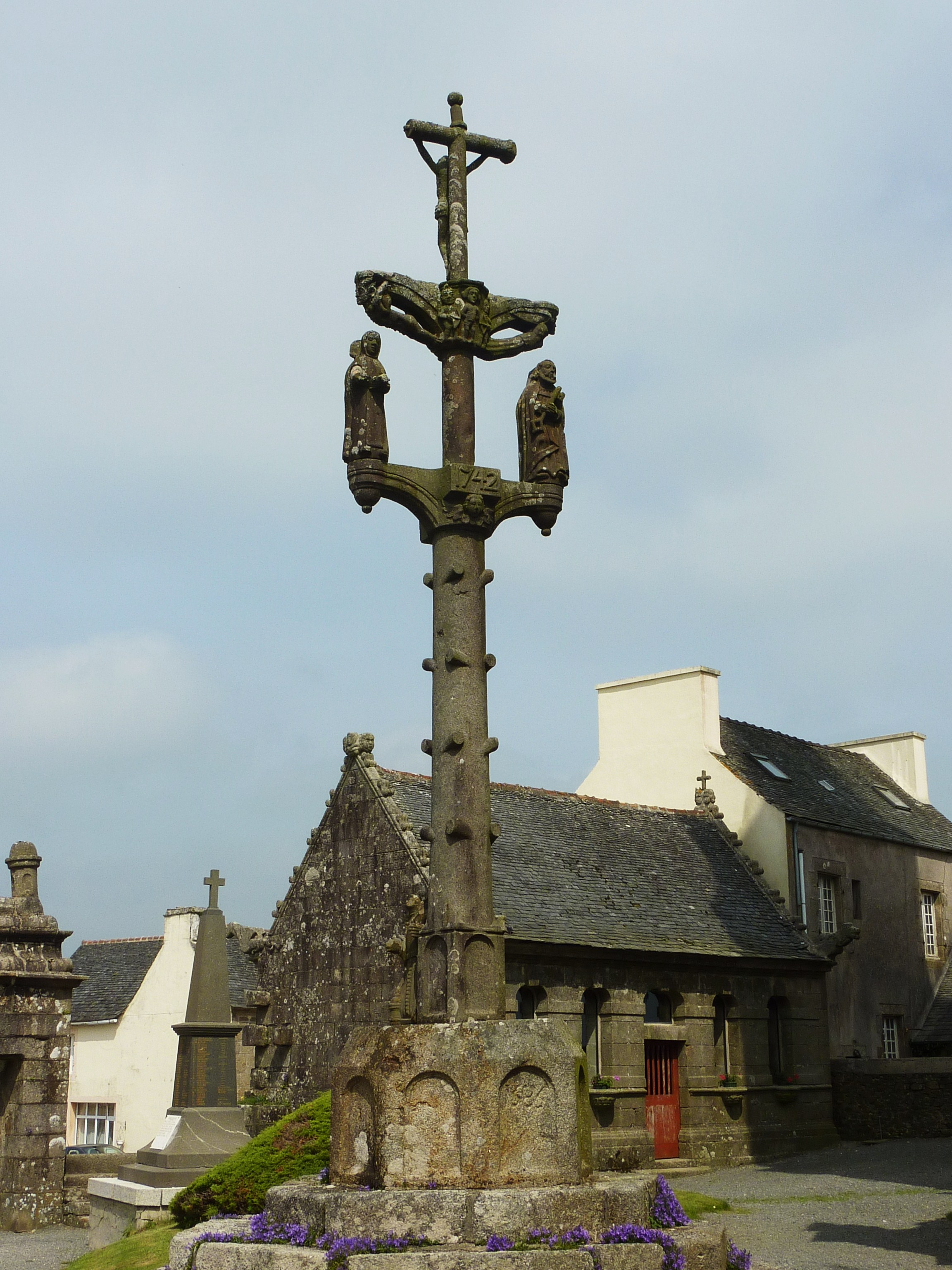
The Calvary and the ossuary at Commana

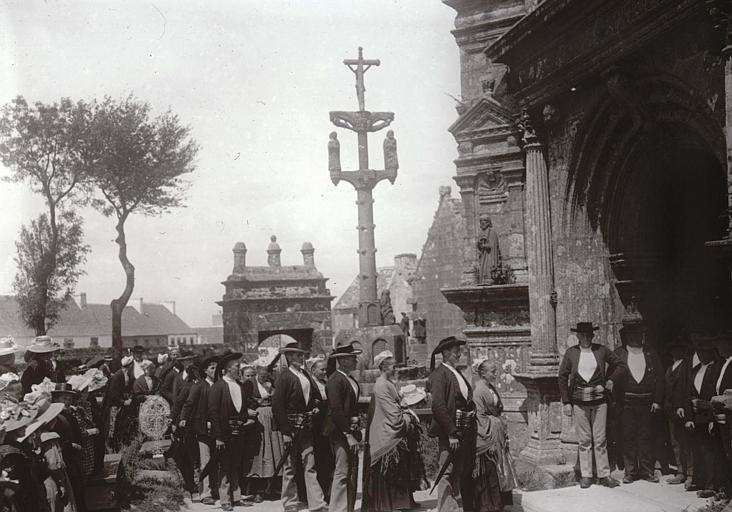
This 1910 photograph shows a wedding taking place at the Commana church. Doré's calvary can be seen in the background.

== Works in the Arrondissement of Châteaulin ==
The following works in the Châteaulin arrondissement are attributed to Doré.

=== Landévennec ===
There are the remains of a crucifix by Doré in the cloister of the Nouvelle abbaye Saint-Guénolé in Landévennec.

=== Crozon ===
In the Crozon parish church presbytery is a statue of Saint Peter thought to have been part of a calvary.

=== Loqueffret ===
In Loqueffret's parish church porch there is a Doré sculpture depicting Saint Marguerite and the baptismal font has a sculpture by Doré of Saint Nicholas. There is a calvary at nearby Bilirit dating to 1625 with Doré sculptures of Christ on the cross and Saint Edern.

=== Ploéven ===
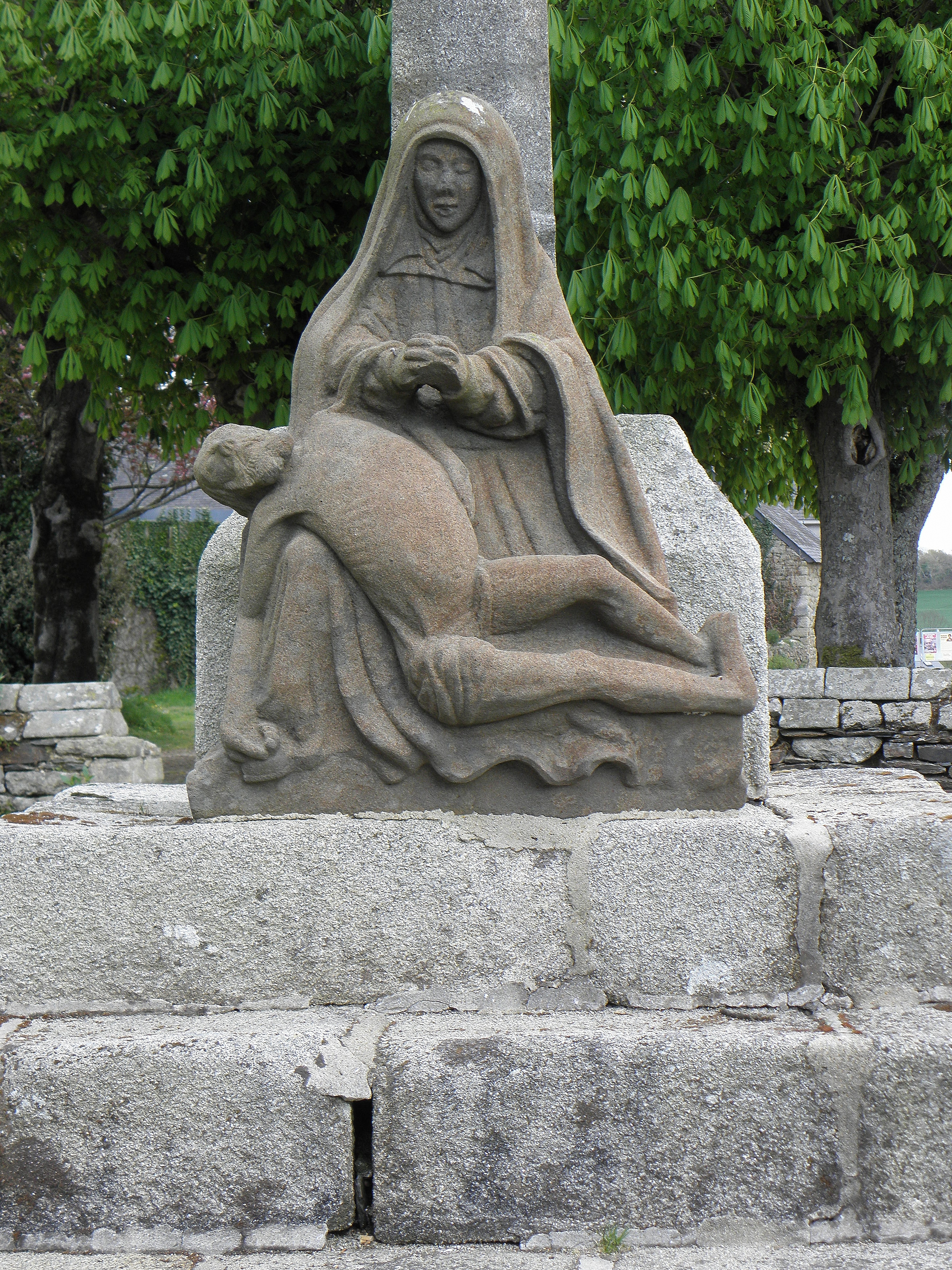
Part of Chapelle Saint-Nicodème calvary

The Chapelle Saint-Nicodème at Kergonan, Ploéven, has a Doré calvary dating to 1637.

=== Saint-Ségal ===
The Dorė atelier are attributed with the sculpture of the Virgin Mary with child in the south porch of the Chapelle Saint Sėbastien as well as the Virgin Mary, Mary Magdalene and John the Evangelist statues on the Saint-Ségal calvary near the monument aux morts.

=== Brennilis ===
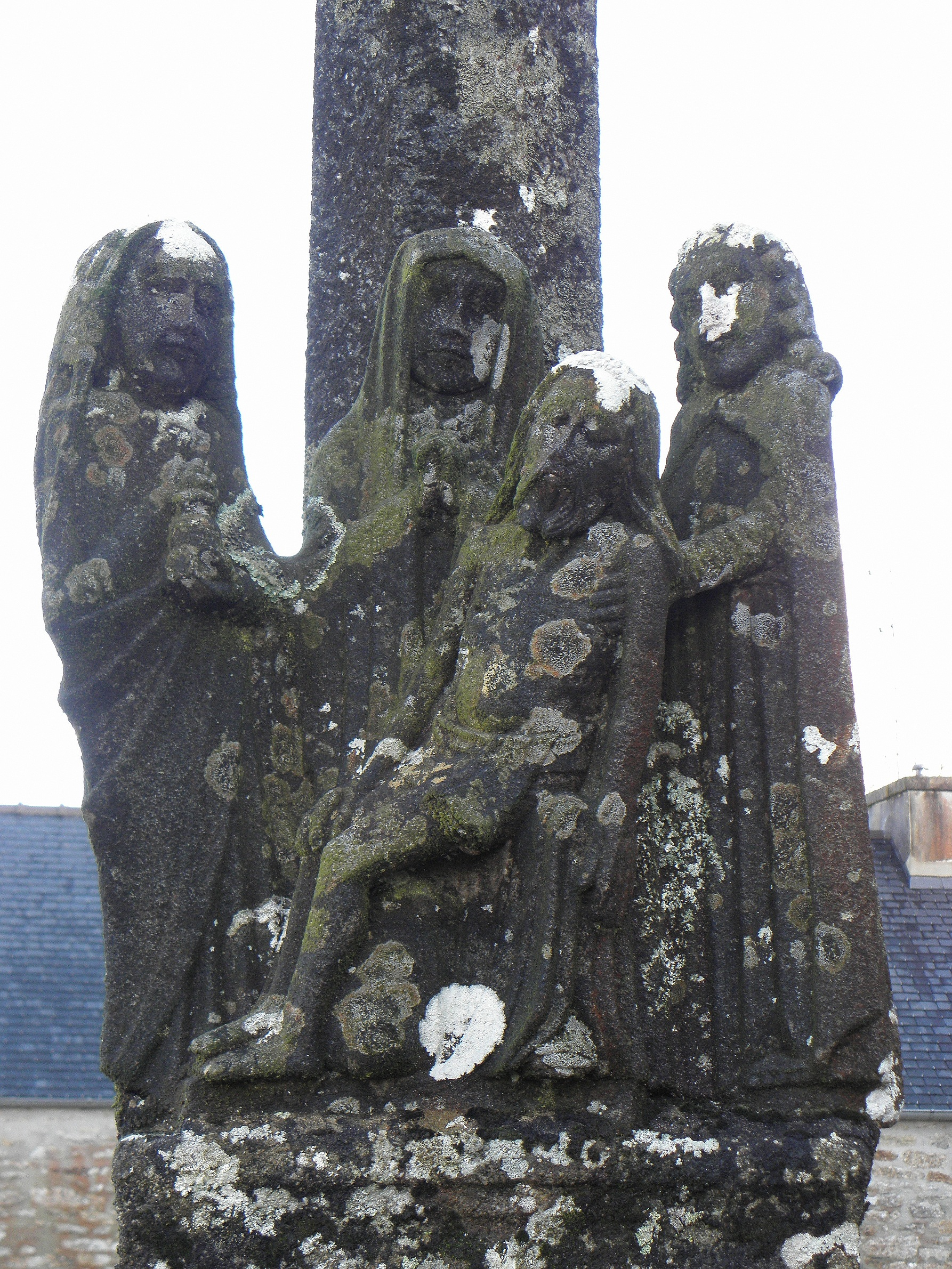
Part of the Brennilis Calvary. The pietà

Outside Brennilis' Notre Dame church, we can see Doré's 5-metre-high (16 ft) Croix de calvaire which dates to 1625 and includes the group "Notre-Dame de Pitié" at the Cross' base. The Cross is located to the north of the church and has the coat of arms (Blason) of the Quélen family at the base. Doré depicts an angel holding the titulus above Jesus' head. At the base of the pedestal supporting the Cross is the pietà "Notre-Dame de Pitié", with a sword bearing the image of the resurrected Christ on the reverse side.

=== Lannédern ===
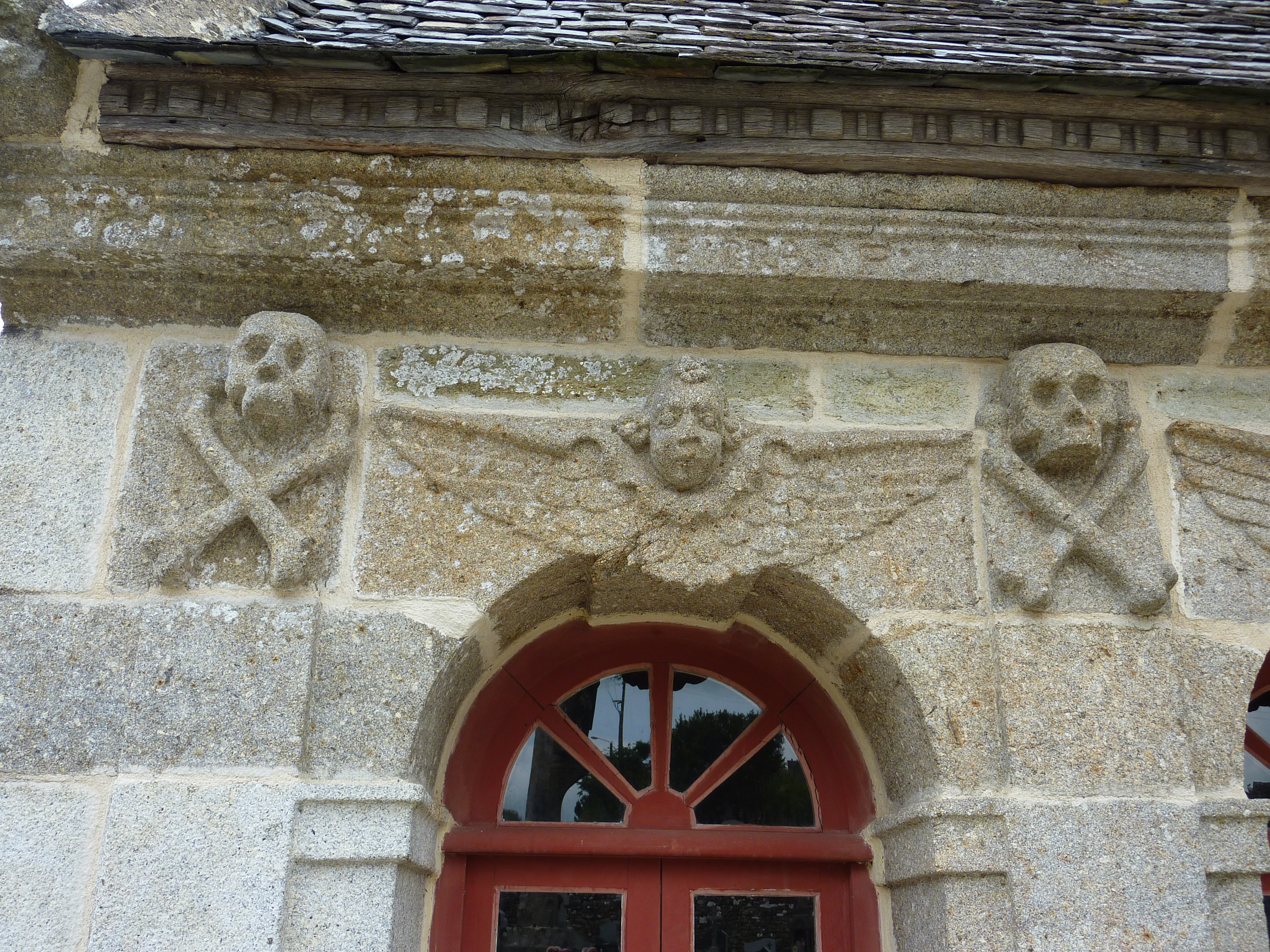
The ankou, part of the decoration of the Lannédern ossuary

The Calvary at Lannédern dates to 1625 and is located in the hamlet of Birilit. Lannédern itself has an interesting enclos and its ossuary has a good example of the Ankou, two in fact. See photograph. Also see Note 2 below.

=== Dinéault ===
There is a calvary in the church enclos of the "bourg" of Dinéault, which lies northwest of Châteaulin. The statues on the calvary include Christ on the cross placed back to back with a depiction of Christ suffering (Christ aux liens), these by Doré and dating to 1648. Records show that the other figures were added later.

=== Cast, Finistère ===
The small commune of Cast, Finistère, lies between Châteaulin and Douarnenez some 25 km (16 mi) north of Quimper and the Église paroissiale Saint-Jérôme in the Rue Kreisker. It has a 1660 Calvary attributed to Doré which carries the inscription

"M:G:G:IC GLINEC R.IAC:CROISSANT F 1660"

It is 7 metres (23 ft) high and at the base of the pedestal is a depiction of Saint Tujan and a Pietà (Vierge de Pitié) whilst on the crosspiece are statues depicting the Virgin Mary and John the Evangelist and Mary Magdalene and Saint Peter. The Église Saint Jérôme has a Dorė sculpture of Saint Mark with his attribute the lion in a niche on the western façade and a statue of the Virgin Mary with child in a niche in the south porch. In the presbytery at Cast there are the remains of a crucifix which included depictions of the Virgin Mary with child and Saint Mark.

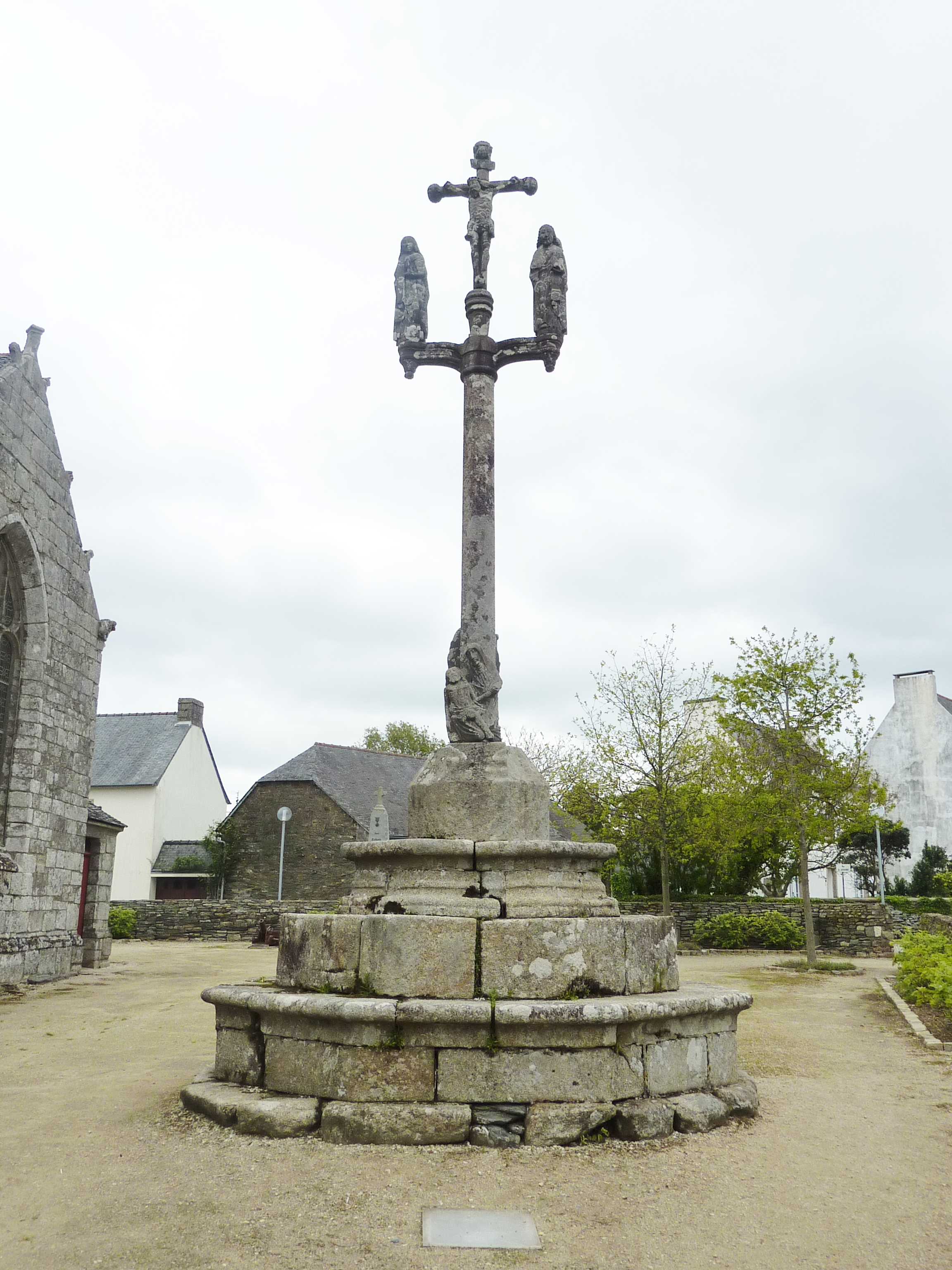
The Calvary outside the Eglise paroissiale Saint-Jérôme

=== Plonévez-Porzay ===
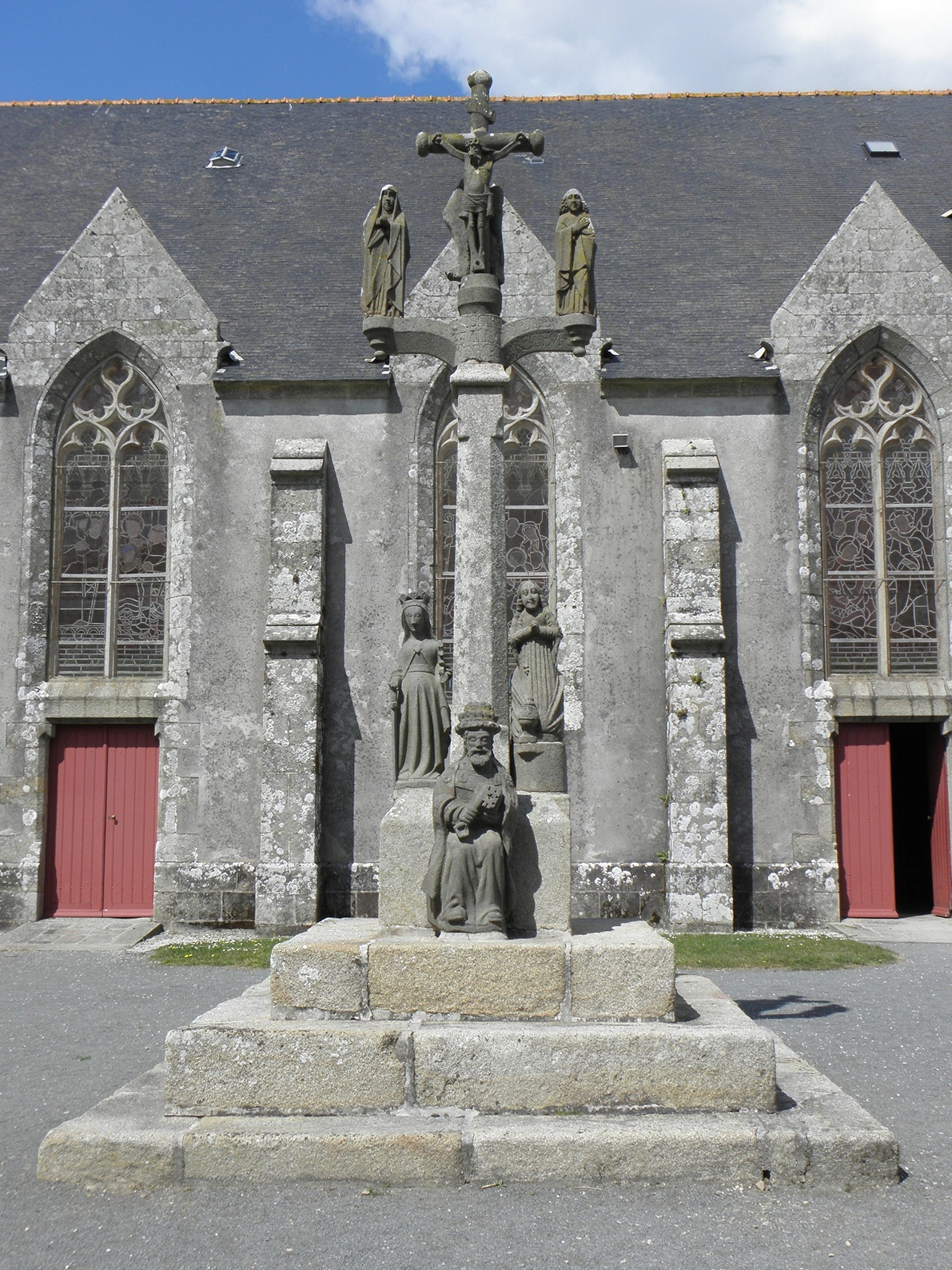
The calvary of Sainte-Anne-la-Palud

The commune of Plonévez-Porzay lies 21 km (13 mi) north of Quimper and Doré executed the calvary of Sainte-Anne-La-Palud. Just 5 metres (16 ft) high, it is thought to date from between 1630 and 1656. On the side opposite Jesus on the cross is a Pietà and on the crosspiece (croisillon) are statues of the Virgin Mary and Saint Peter and John the Evangelist and Saint James the Greater. On the pedestal are what are thought to be remnants of other calvaries which are no longer in existence, namely a statue of Saint Catherine from the 15th Century and statues of Mary Magdalene and Saint Peter.

=== Port-Launay ===
The Saint-Aubin chapel in the village of Lanvaïdic contains the commune of Port-Launay's calvary sculpted by Doré in 1631. The sculptures have been damaged and some have been placed in the chapel itself. The Dorė atelier are also credited with execution of the cross at Lanvaïdic in 1651.

=== Saint-Nic ===
The Dorė atelier worked on both the church calvary and that of the Saint-Côme chapel in Saint-Nic.

=== Rosnoën ===
Nearby the church in Rosnoën is the memorial to those men of the commune who gave their lives in the 1914-1918 and 1939-1945 wars, and this has used the surviving statues from Doré's 1648 calvary, namely statues back to back or géminée of John the Evangelist and Saint Bartholomew, the statue of the Virgin Mary and a bishop, a pietà, and a statue of Saint Audoēn. Also for the Église Saint-Audoēn, the atelier executed a Dieu sauveur for the south porch and a Virgin Mary with child for the west porch.

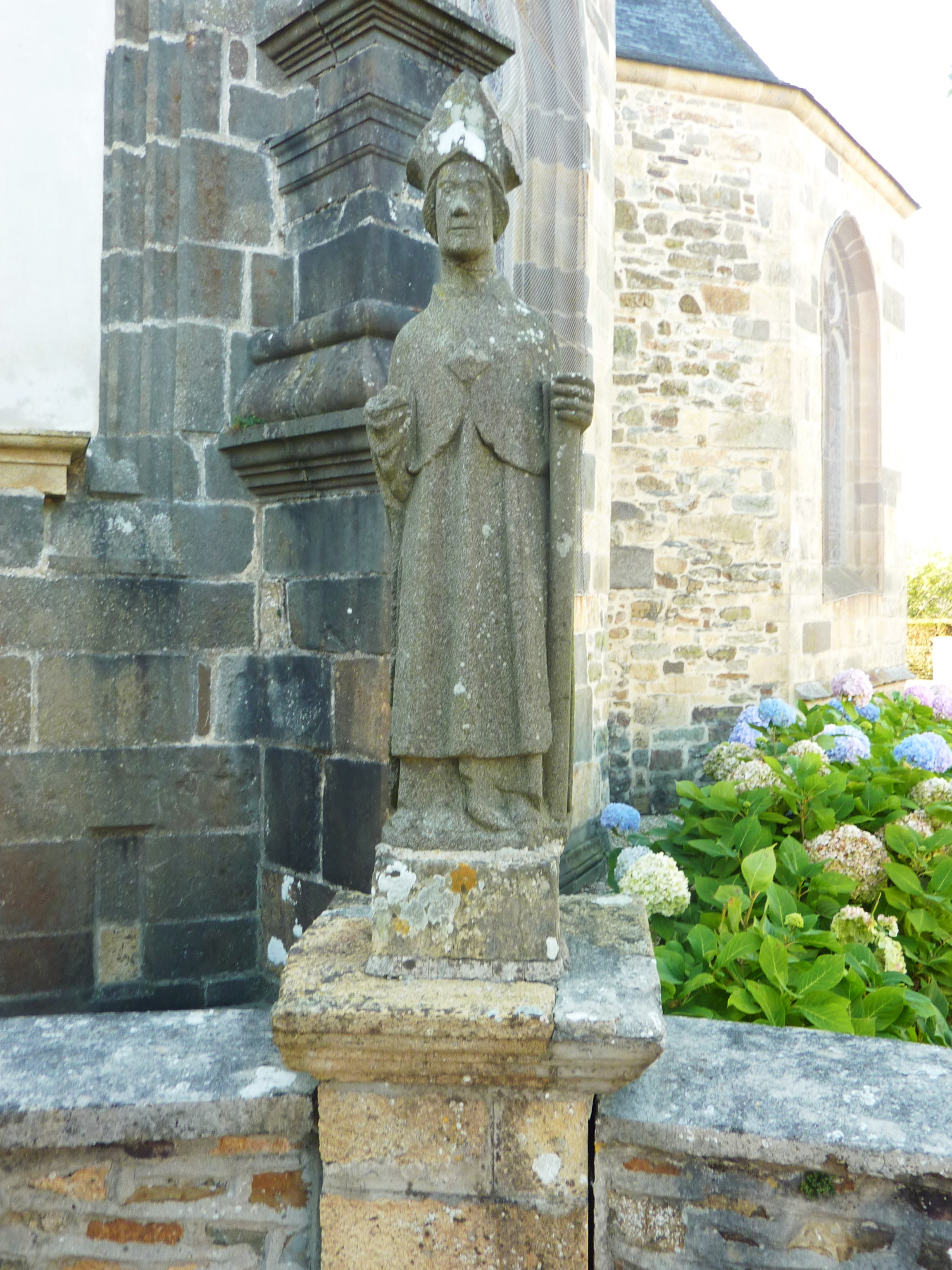
The Rosnoën monument aux morts-The Virgin Mary and a bishop

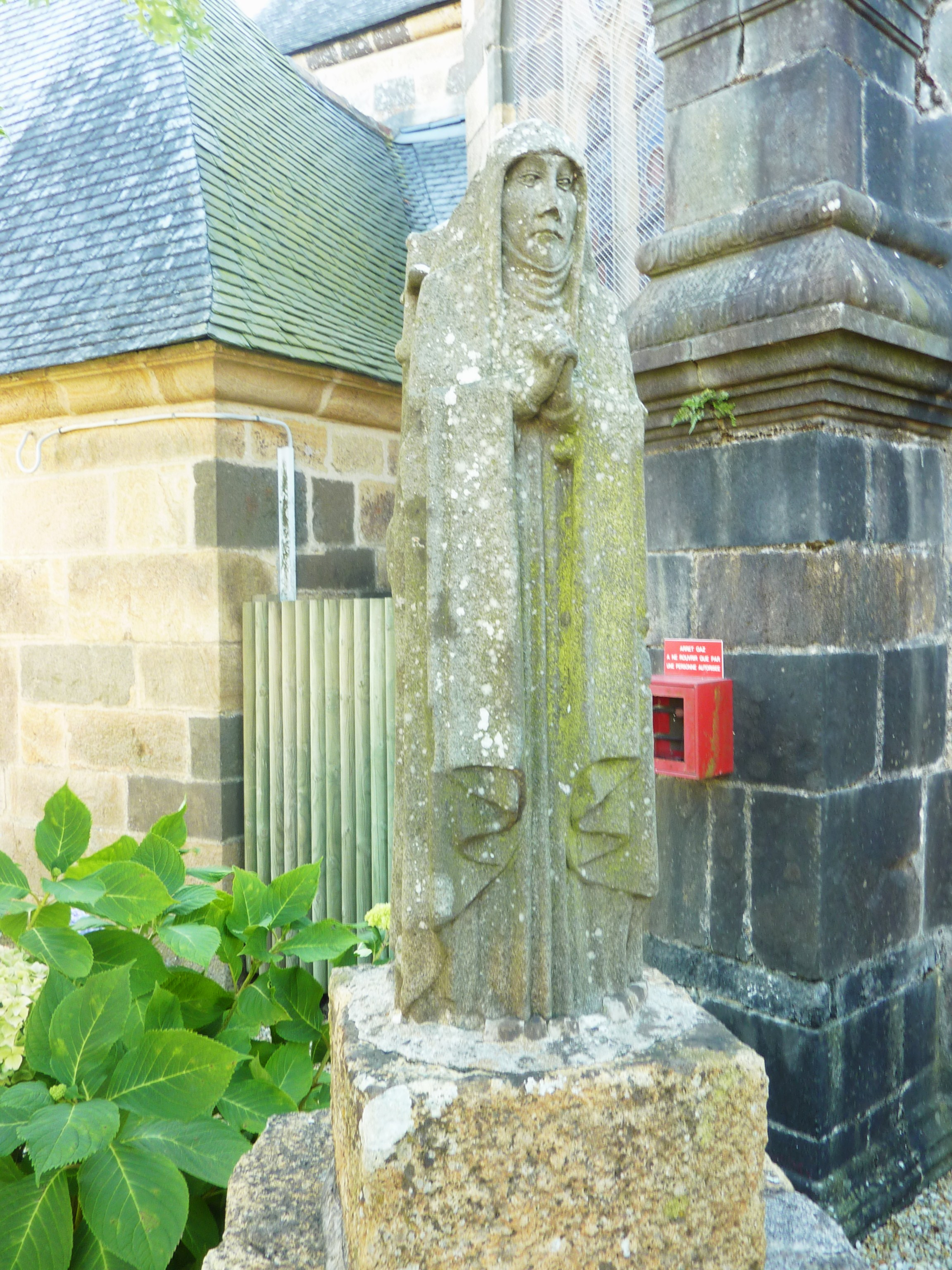
The Rosnoën monument aux morts-The "Vierge de Pitié"

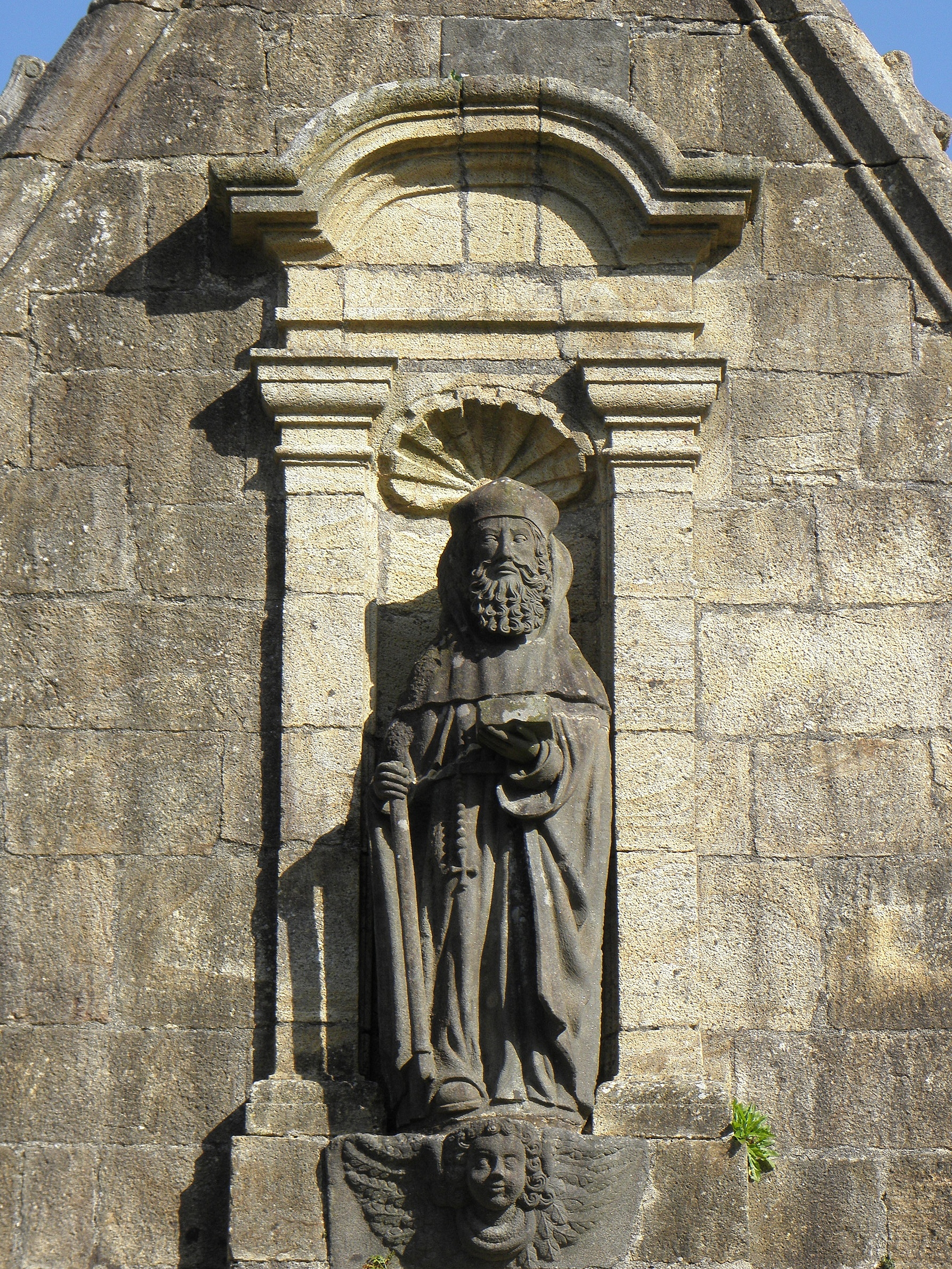
Saint Audoēn

=== Telgruc-sur-Mer ===
As part of the decoration of the arc de triomphe of the enclos of the Église Saint-Magloire in Telgruc-sur-Mer, Doré executed back-to-back statues of Saint Magloire and Saint Guénolé. See Winwaloe.

=== Chapelle Notre-Dame de Kerluan at Châteaulin ===
This Doré Calvary by the chapel Notre-Dame at Châteaulin dates to 1639, a year when the region suffered an outbreak of the plague. On the Cross's crosspiece are statues of the Virgin Mary, Jesus on the cross and John the Evangelist. The statues of Saint Sébastien and St Roch were not works by the Dorė atelier. There is also a pietà by Dorė in the Châteaulin Église Saint-Idunet's north transept.

== Works by Doré in the Arrondissement of Quimper ==
Doré is attributed with the following works in the Quimper arrondissement.

=== Penmarch ===
In Penmarch or Penmarc'h's Êglise Saint-Nonna is a sculpture of the Virgin Mary with child which is attributed to the Dorė atelier. The atelier are also credited with the crucifix on the "Croix de Lescors".

=== Douarnenez ===
At Pouldavid's Saint-Vendal chapel there is a calvary dating to 1655. Doré sculpted Christ on the cross reversed with the Virgin Mary with child and back to back statues depicting a bishop with a book reversed with John the Evangelist and a bishop giving a blessing reversed with the Virgin Mary, There are also statues by the Dorė atelier of John the Evangelist reversed with Saint Corentin and the Virgin Mary reversed with Saint Nicholas. These are thought to be the remains of a calvary at Douarnenez-Trėboul, and in the presbytery at Douarnenez-Trėboul is a crucifix also attributed to Dorė and thought to have been part of a calvary.

=== Plogonnec ===
At Seznec near Plogonnec is the Chapelle Saint-Denis, with a Doré calvary dating to 1641. Christ is depicted on the Cross and below him are back to back ("géminées") statues of the Virgin Mary and John the Evangelist and two bishops. Three angels are shown at Jesus' side collecting blood from his wounds into small pots. At Plogonnec the 1644 calvary of the Saint Pierre chapel is also by the Dorė atelier.

=== Briec ===
For the Chapelle de Trolez (Saint-Guėnolė) in Briec, Dorė executed a cross with a depiction on the shaft of the cross of Saint-Guėnolė back to back with a saint. Dorė also executed the crucifix. The cross stands in the churchyard.

=== Cléden-Cap-Sizun ===
In the enclos of the commune Cléden-Cap-Sizun there is a Doré calvary carrying the coats of arms of René de Keridiern and the mayor of Keryvon. In 1630, Doré created another calvary for the Saint-They chapel. This was mutilated but the statues of the Virgin Mary and St Jacques de Compostelle (Saint James the Greater) have been kept. Cléden-Cap-Sizun lies at the tip of Cap-Sizun, west of Quimper

=== Sizun ===
In the Sizun Musée des Arts et traditions populaires, there is a Doré sculpture of the "bad robber" ("mauvais larron") thought to be what remains of a larger calvary.

=== Esquibien ===
The Doré calvary of Sainte Edwett at Esquibien dates to 1633. To his depiction of Jesus on the cross, Doré added statues of the Virgin Mary and bishop Saint Onneau

=== Trézilidé ===
There is a Doré calvary in the Trézilidé parish church dating to 1630, although the John the Evangelist back to back with a bishop is by another sculptor. Doré's atelier did execute the depictions of Christ on the cross, the two robbers, the "Notre-Dame de Pitié", and the statues "géminées" of the Virgin Mary and Saint Peter.

=== Plouédern ===
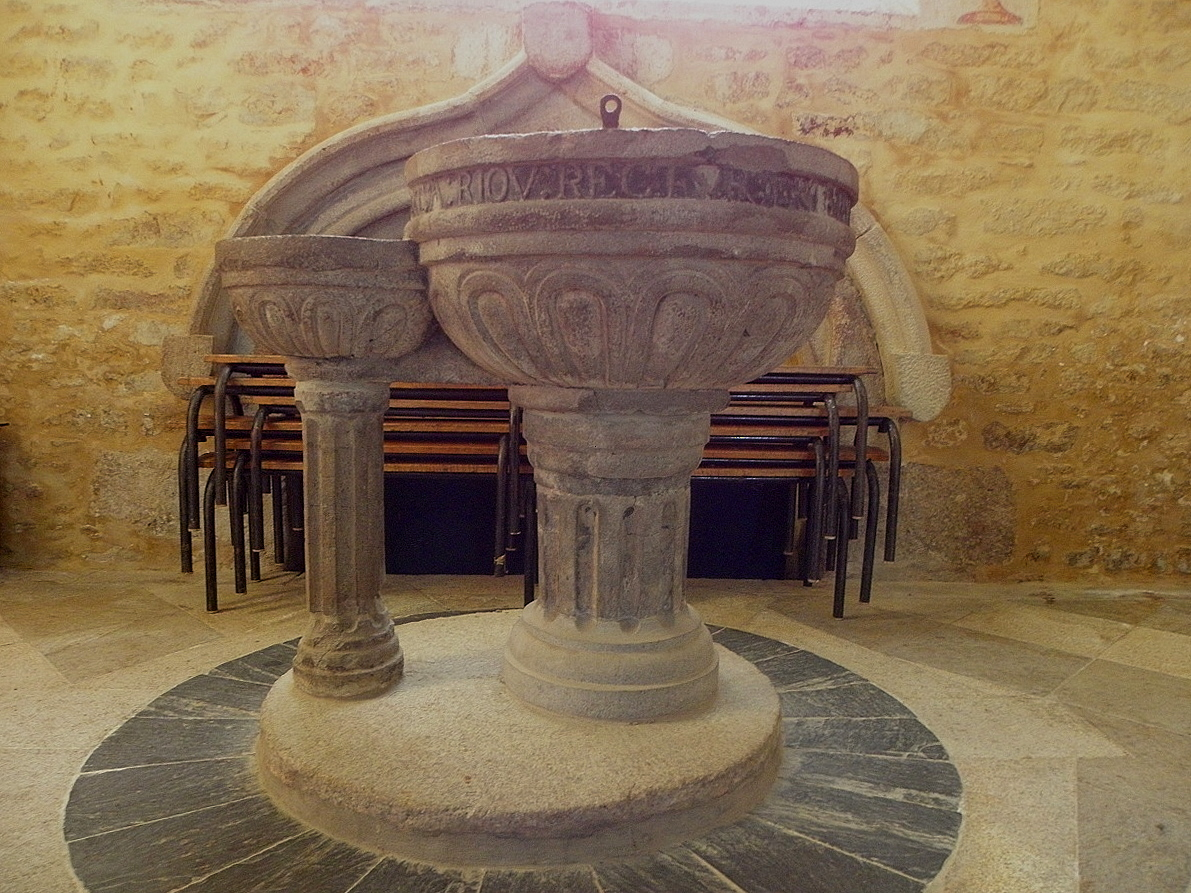
Fonts by Doré in the Église Saint-Édern in Plouédern

In 1974, the church at Plouédern, the Église Saint-Edern, was completely devastated by a fire but was restored for worship in 1978. Doré's 1641 baptismal font (cuve de baptême) survived the fire, but the font's canopy (baldaquin} did not.

=== Plourin-lès-Morlaix ===
The enclos paroissial of Plourin-lès-Morlaix comprises the usual church, cemetery, ossuary and retaining wall and in and around the church are several statues by Doré which had been part of a calvary. The church, the Église Notre-Dame, has several side chapels and these are where the Doré works can be found as well as on the enclosure wall. These statues, dating to 1630, include Saint Yves and Saint Femme (back to back or "géminées"), Saint Evêque, Saint Matthew with a winged angel at his feet, the usual symbol for this saint, St Luke with his attribute the bull, Saint Grégoire, John the Evangelist with his attribute the eagle, Saint Mark with lion and a group comprising Saint Anne and the Virgin Mary with child. There are also back to back sculptures of Saint Paul and Saint Madeleine and the Virgin Mary with Saint Francis, a Vierge de Pitié and a group depicting the flight from Egypt (La fuite en Egypte). What remains of the figure of Christ can be seen on the wall in the church's "Chapelle de la Vierge-des-douleurs".

=== The parish church of Saint-Pierre ===
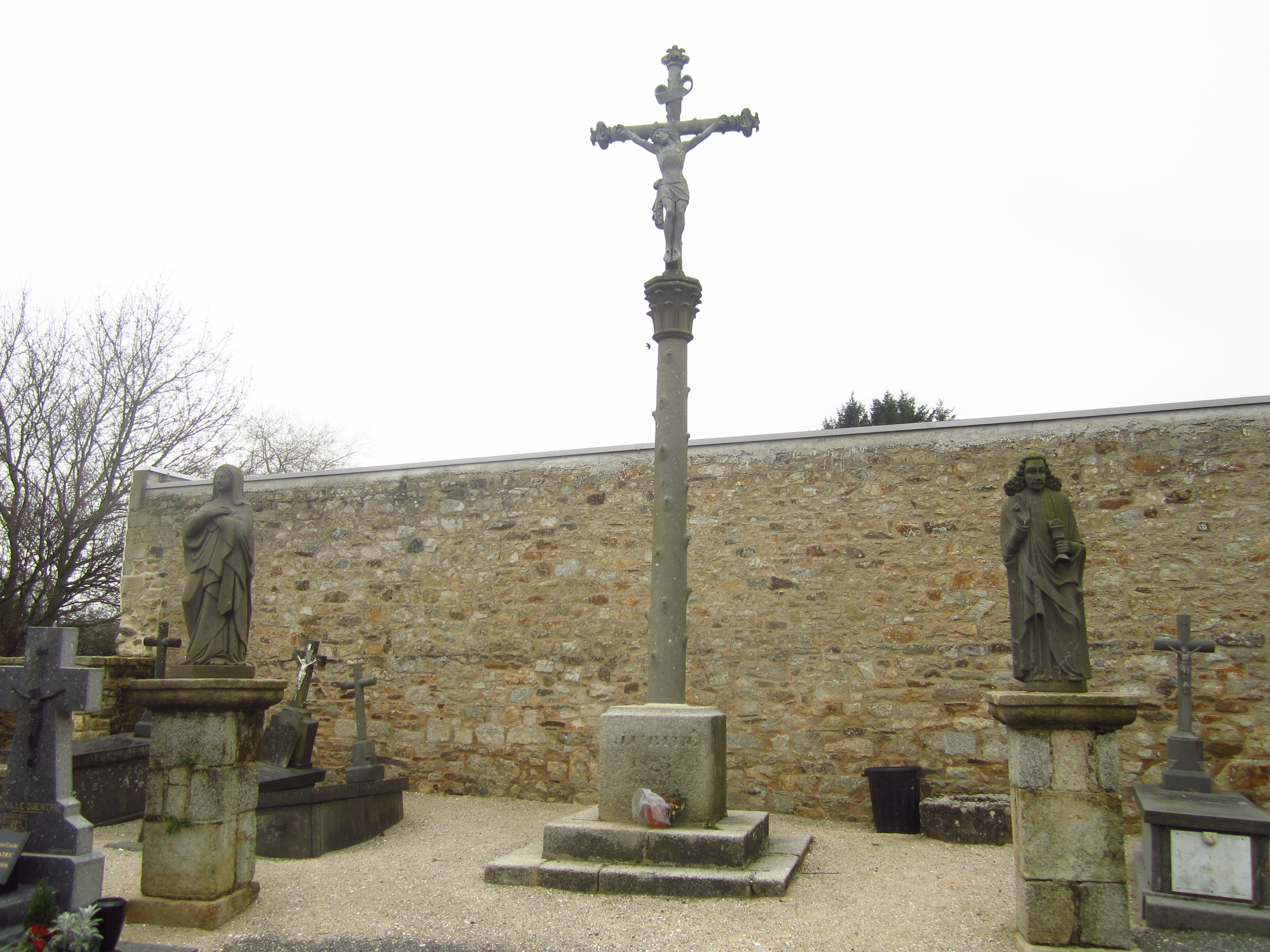
The Poulgar Calvary. Roland Doré's John the Evangelist can be seen to the right of the Cross

This church in Plougar has a calvary in its graveyard sculpted by Yann Larhantec with statues of the Virgin Mary and St John on either side of the Cross bearing the crucified Jesus. Doré's standing statue of John the Evangelist is positioned nearby.

=== Poullan-sur-Mer ===
Doré's "Croix de chemin" at Poullan-sur-Mer is also known as the "Kervignac" cross and dates to 1640. It was restored in 1843. The statues from the cross are kept in a nearby farm.

== Works by Doré in the Côtes-d'Armor department ==
The arrondissements of Lannion, Dinan, Saint Brieuc and Guingamp are the four Arrondissements of the Côtes-d'Armor. There are fewer calvaries in this department of Brittany, and as a consequence fewer works by Doré. This coastal area (ar mor means "the sea" in Breton and Côtes means "coasts" in French) is famous for the Pink Granite Coast (Côte de Granit Rose) and for Tréguier and its cathedral of St Tugdual.

=== Lantic ===
The Doré atelier worked on the calvary of Lantic's Église Notre-Dame de la Cour, sculpting the crucifix and the Virgin Mary with child and the coats of arms of the Rosmadec family.

=== Ploumilliau ===
Doré was the sculptor of the calvary at Coz-Douar in Ploumilliau. The work was carried out in 1622 and comprises Christ on the cross and the Virgin Mary with child.

=== Ploubazlanec ===
For the calvary at Loguivy-de-la-Mer in Ploubazlanec, Doré sculpted the figures of the Virgin Mary and John the Evangelist.

=== Lannion ===
On the northeast pinnacle of the Église Saint-Jean-de-Baly in Lannion is a sculpture by Doré of the Virgin Mary.

=== Plestin-les-Grèves ===
Doré is attributed with having completed statues of the twelve apostles and of Christ for the porch of the Saint-Efflam church in Plestin-les-Grèves in 1619. On the church's façade there are back-to-back Doré sculptures of the Virgin Mary/Saint Yves and John the Evangelist back-to-back with an unidentified saint. These four sculptures are thought to have been part of a calvary. It was only in the porch of Plestin-les-Grèves and that at Pleyber-Christ that Roland Doré sculpted all twelve statues of the apostles.

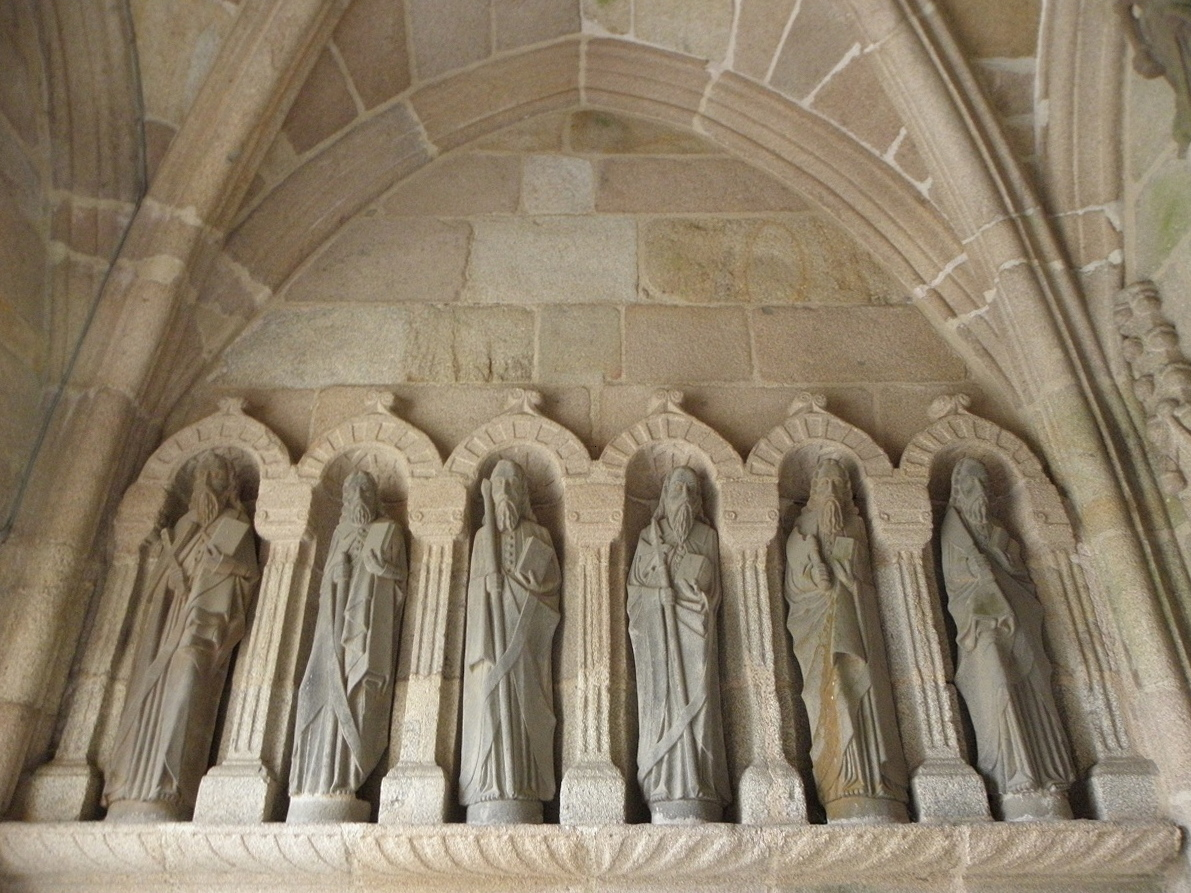
Some of Doré's sculptures of the twelve apostles in the porch of the Saint-Efflam church at Plestin-les-Grèves

=== Senven-Léhart ===
Senven-Léhart is a commune in the Guingamp arrondissement of the Côtes-d'Armor department of Brittany. It is about 16 km (9.9 mi) south of Ploumagoar. Although most of Doré's work is to be seen in Finistère, the calvary by the entrance to the Église Notre-Dame is one of the calvaries that he worked on in the Côtes-d'Armor region. It dates to 1635 and originally had 19 statues but the ravages of time and the Reign of Terror have seen these reduced to 12. The base of the calvary is granite whilst the statues were carved from kersantite. This calvary has three crosses, those of the two robbers Gesmas and Dismas on either side of that of Christ. The "bad" robber grimaces defiantly whilst the "good" robber looks to be at peace. Some have remarked that Doré's Pietà is one of the most beautiful in Brittany. Jesus is laid across Mary's lap whilst Marie-Salomé supports his head and Mary Magdalene carries the oil to be used for the embalming. Also at the foot of the cross, Mary appears again and two horsemen are placed to her left and her right, one of whom was thought to represent Saint Longinus. John the Evangelist is also depicted with a full head of hair. On the reverse side of the calvary, Saint Peter is depicted carrying his key and a book, and below him is a depiction of Christ being taunted (Christ aux outrages) with Saint Yves to his left, dressed as a lawyer and Saint Louis carrying a symbol of justice.

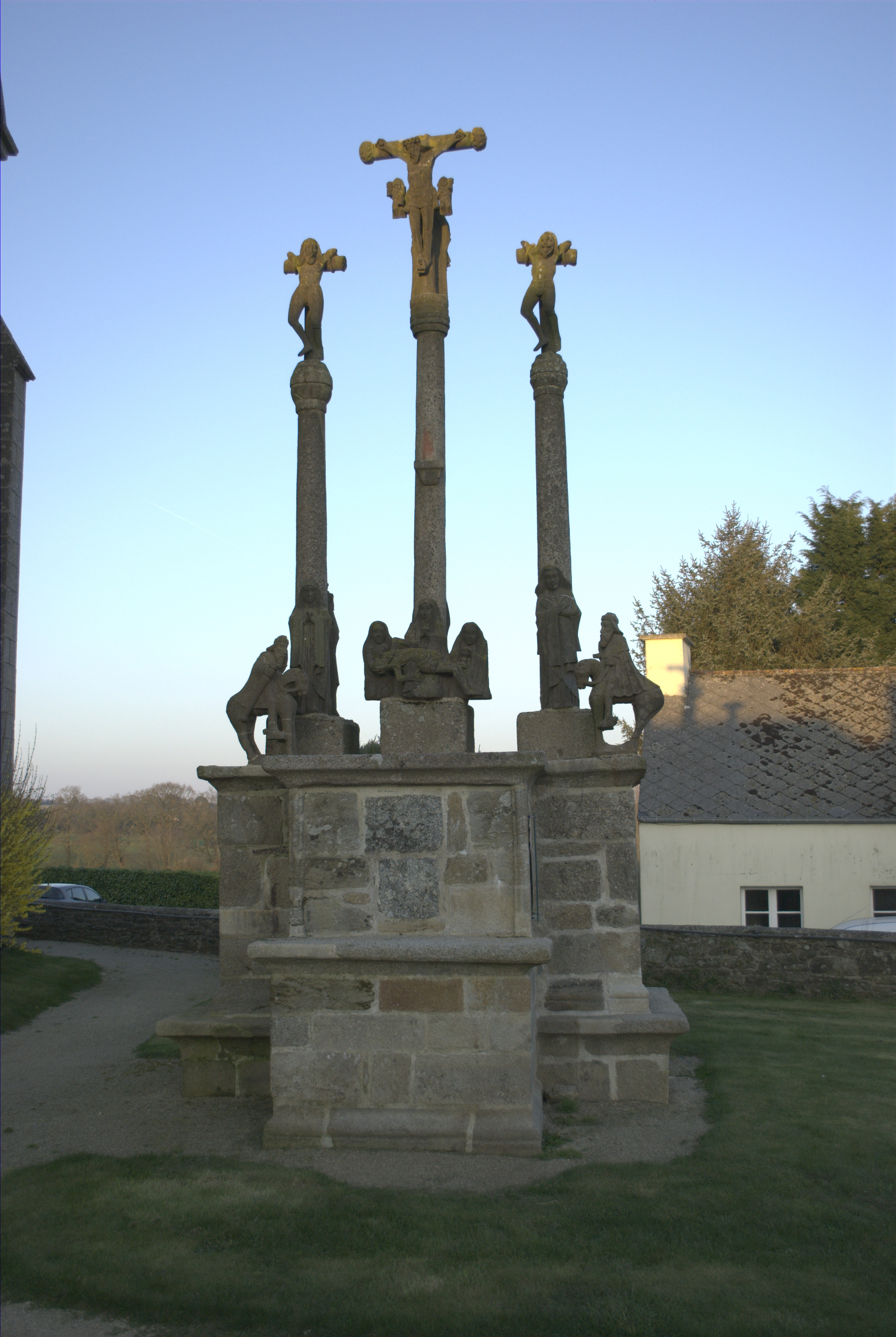
The calvary at Senven-Léhart view from the front.

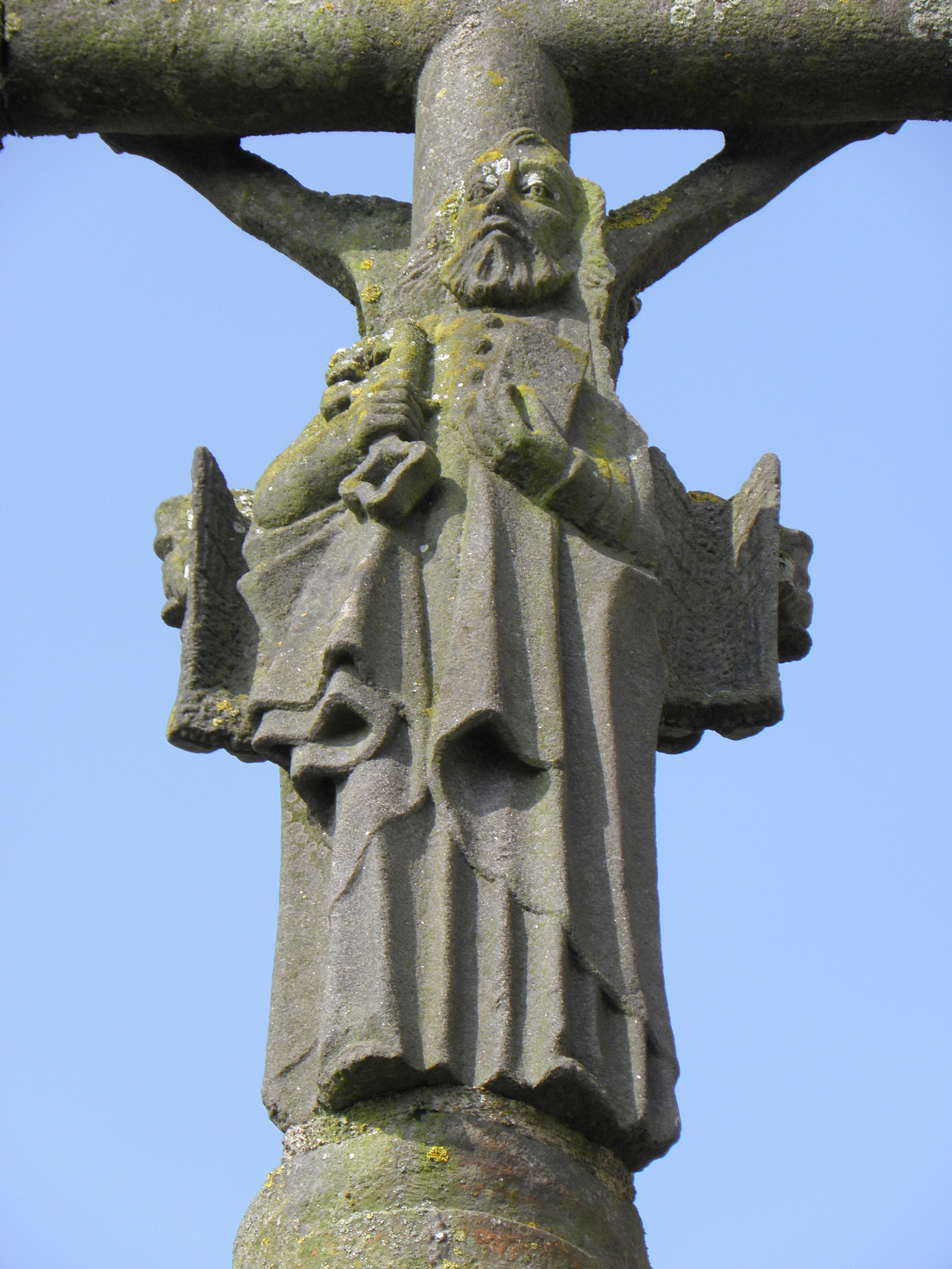
St Peter with key and book. Part of the Senven-Léhart calvary

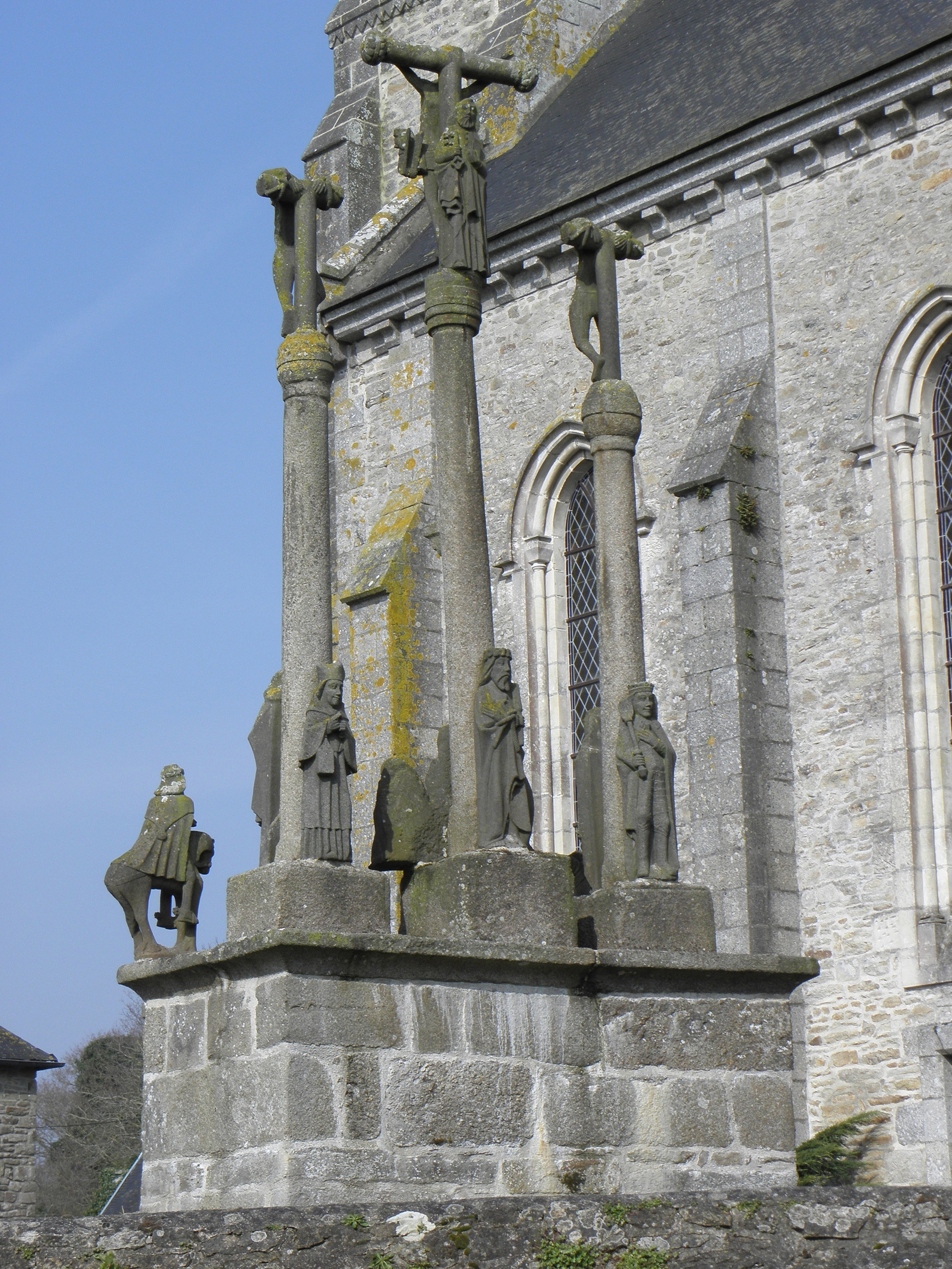
The calvary at Senven-Léhart. The calvary viewed from the rear.

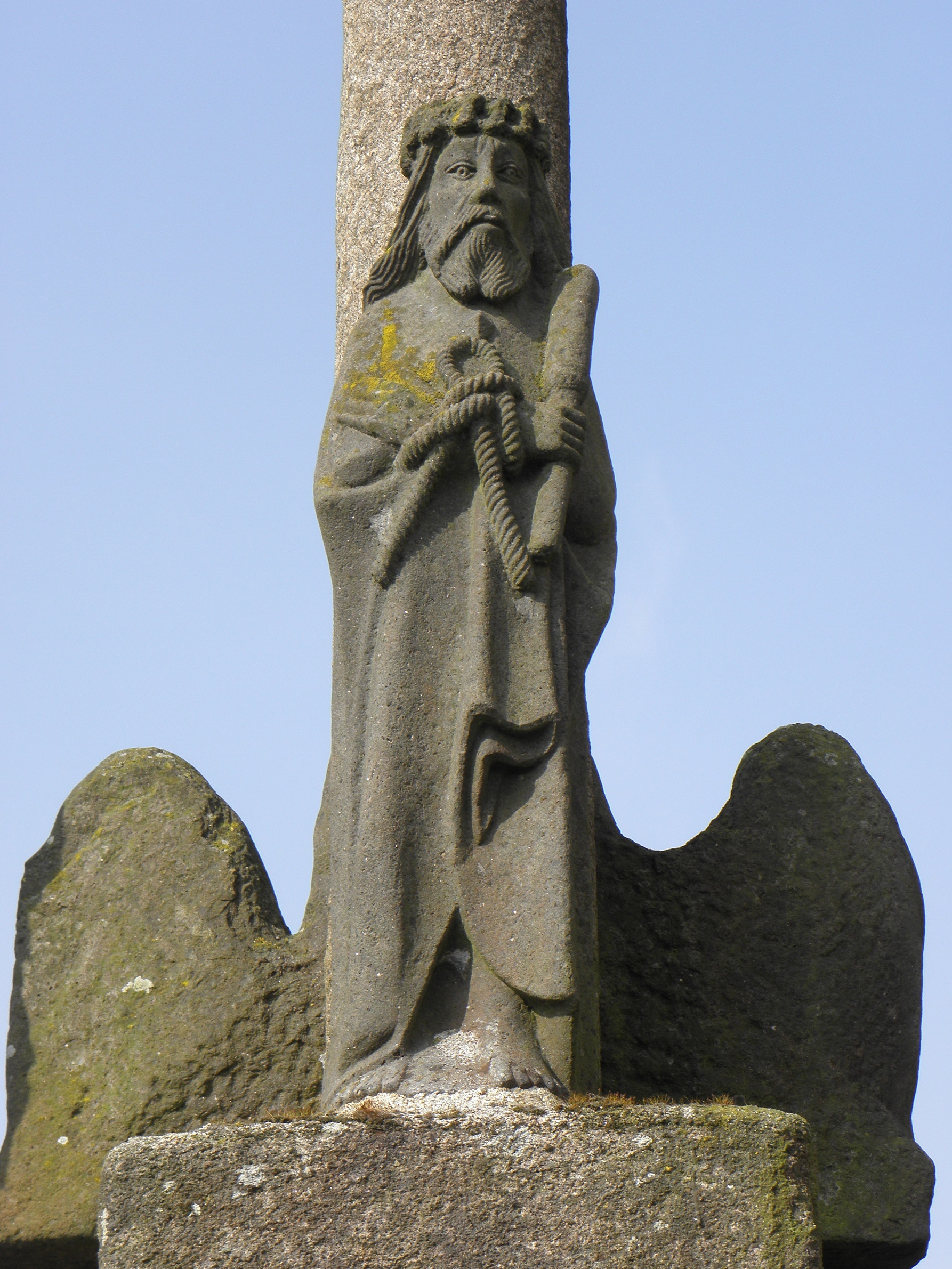
"Christ aux outrages". Part of the Senven-Léhart calvary

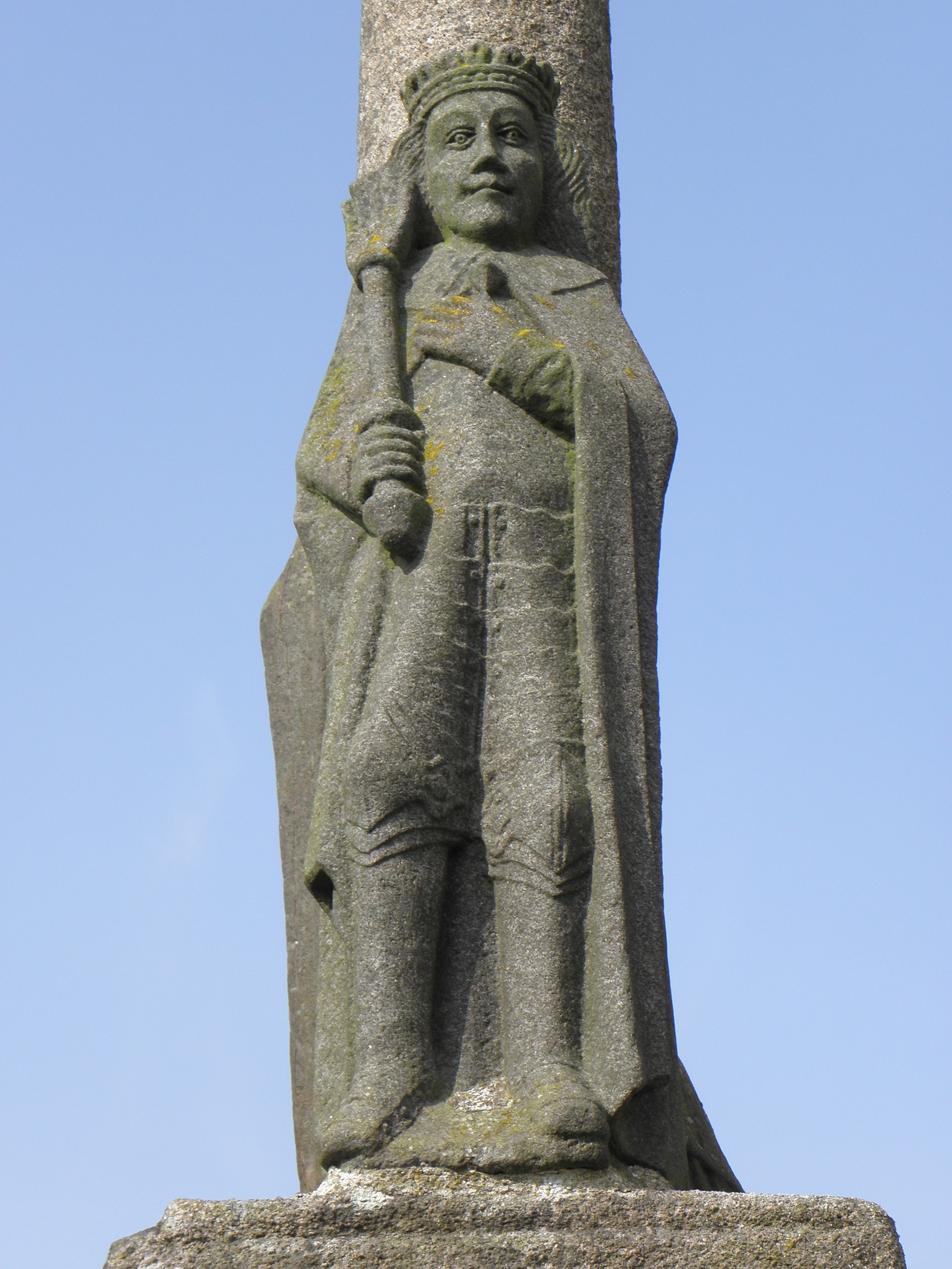
St Louis. Part of the Senven-Léhart calvary

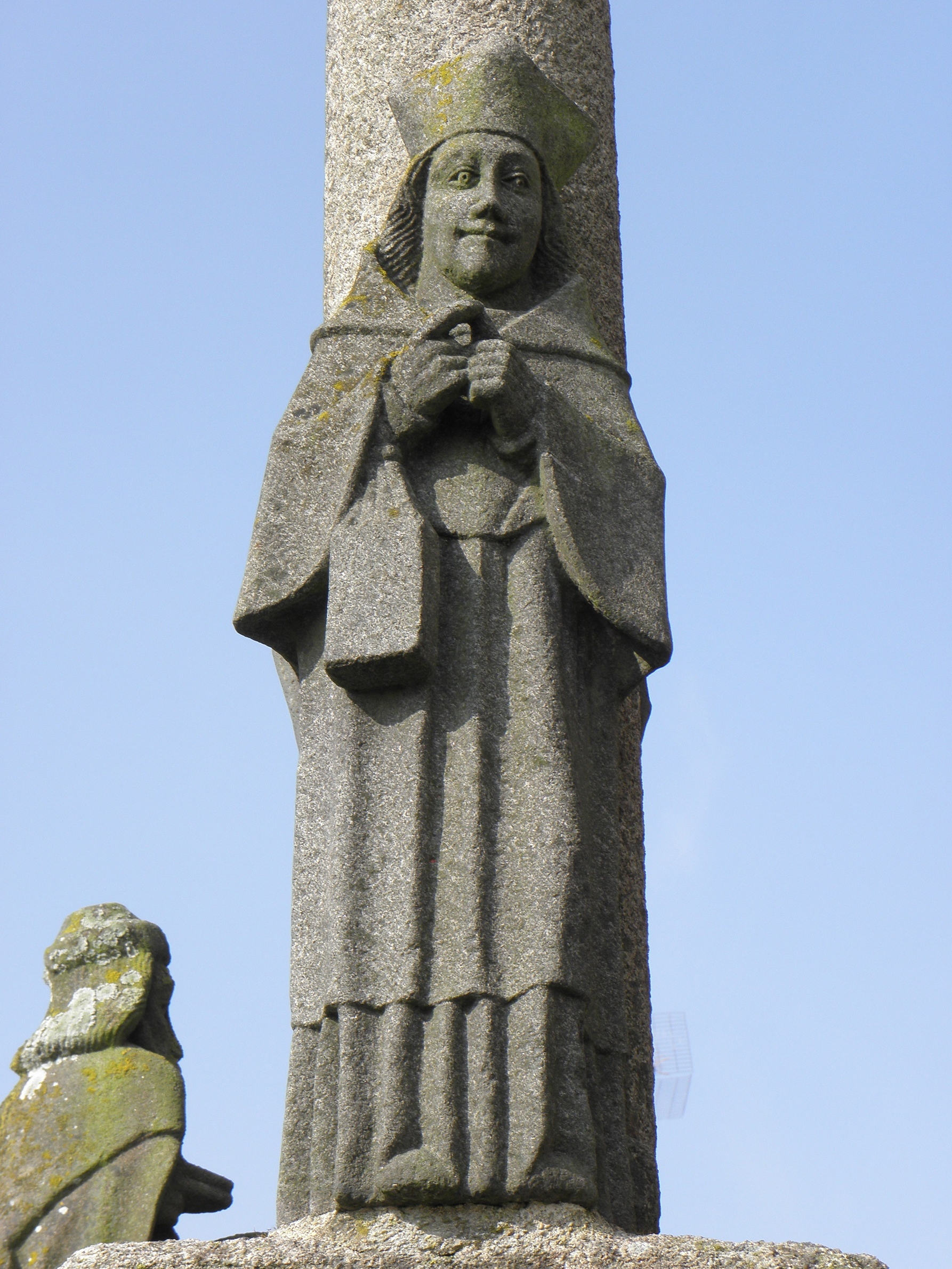
St Yves in the costume of a lawyer. One of the statues on Doré's calvary at Senven-Léhart.

== Works in Morbihan ==
Doré has been attributed with the following work in Morbihan.

=== Saint Joseph ===
Doré's statue of Saint Joseph at Kerloaguen is reckoned to be the first modern statue of the Virgin Mary's husband. It was in 1640 that François le Cozic, the squire of Kerloaguen in Plougonven, decided to commission a statue of Joseph for the chapel he had placed under that saint's patronage and he chose Doré to execute the statue. In 1921, Pope Grégoire XV had ordered that 19 March be devoted as a feast day of the Virgin Mary's husband, and the Saint Joseph cult grew rapidly. In 1624, Quebec, in Canada, named Saint Joseph as their patron saint. When the chapel fell into ruin, the Saint Joseph statue was taken into the Église Saint-Joseph in Plougonven.

=== Quéven ===
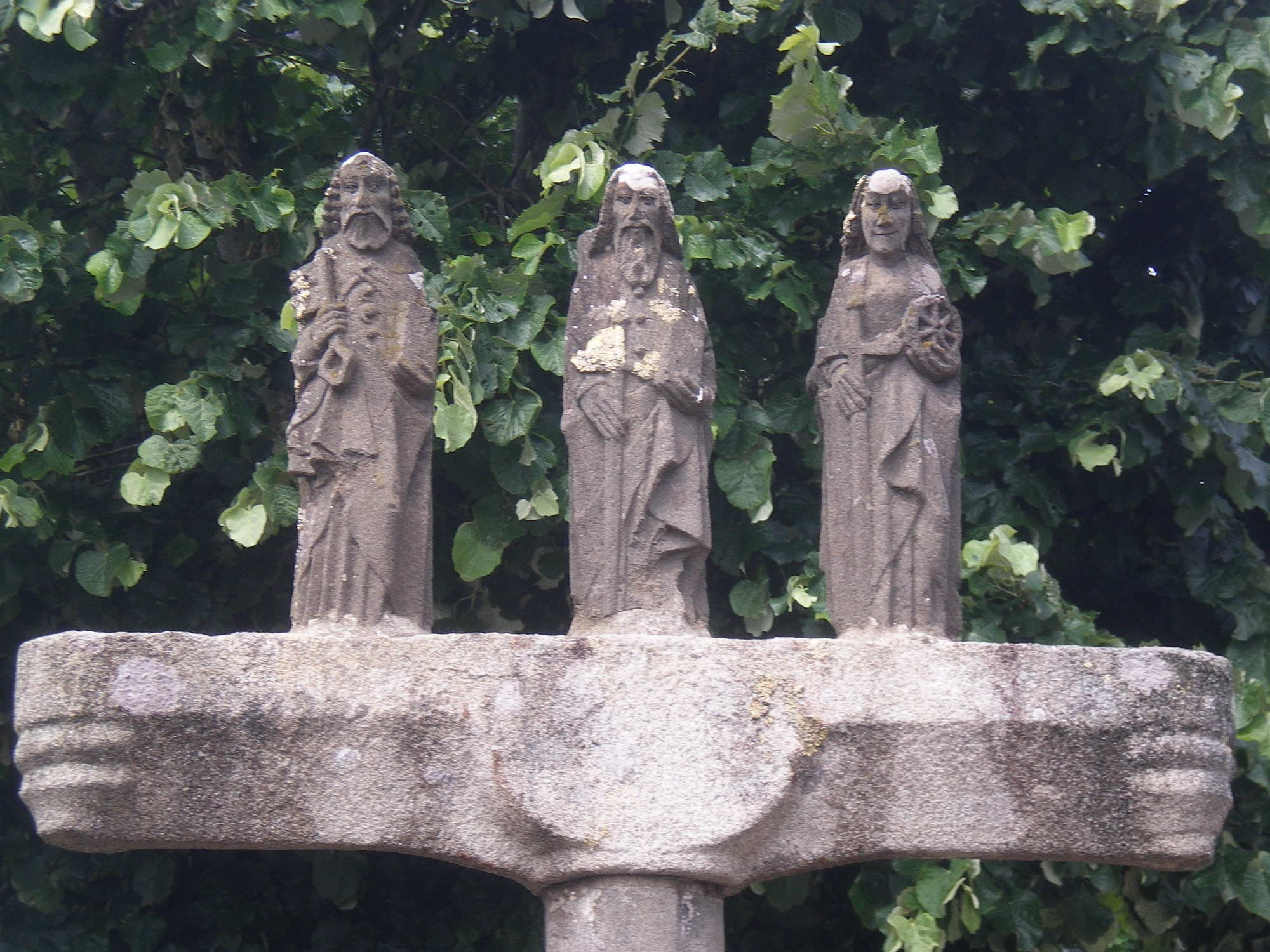
The Quéven Calvary

Doré was the sculptor of the calvary in Quéven's old cemetery in the Rue du docteur Dieny just by the church. Originally there were a total of sixteen statues on the calvary, placed back to back as is the practice with Breton calvaries, but only five now survive, those of Saint Peter, Saint Paul and Saint Catherine and two bishops. The statue of Saint Paul stands alone.

=== The Guimiliau Parish church ===
The decoration of the porch of the Guimiliau parish church, the Église Saint-Miliau, was undertaken by the Maitre de Plougastel in 1606 and Doré added the bust of a woman and a 1.10-metre-high (3.6 ft) statue of Christ enseignant to the Maitre de Plougastel's sculpture.

== Doré's funereal sculpture ==
Doré sculpted gisant for several tombs in Brittany.

== The tomb of Jacques Barbier ==
This tomb is located in the Saint-Maudet chapel at Lesneven. It dates to 1638.

== The gisant of Yves Le Bervet du Parc ==
Doré has been credited with creating the gisant, or effigy, for this tomb which is held by the Musée Départemental Breton in Quimper. It had been in the cemetery of the Saint-Eutrope chapel in Plougonven. Doré also executed the gisant of Auffray de Chastel in the museum.

== The tomb of Guillaume de Rosmadec ==
This tomb by Doré is in the Église Notre-Dame la Cour in Lantic.

== The tomb of Thébault de Tanouam ==
This tomb by Doré is located in Plérin's parish church.

== The Bois-Boissel tomb ==
This tomb is one of several located in the cloister of Tréguier cathedral. The photograph below shows how the gisants are positioned in the cloister. Doré also executed two gisant for the Bréhant family which are in the cathedral.

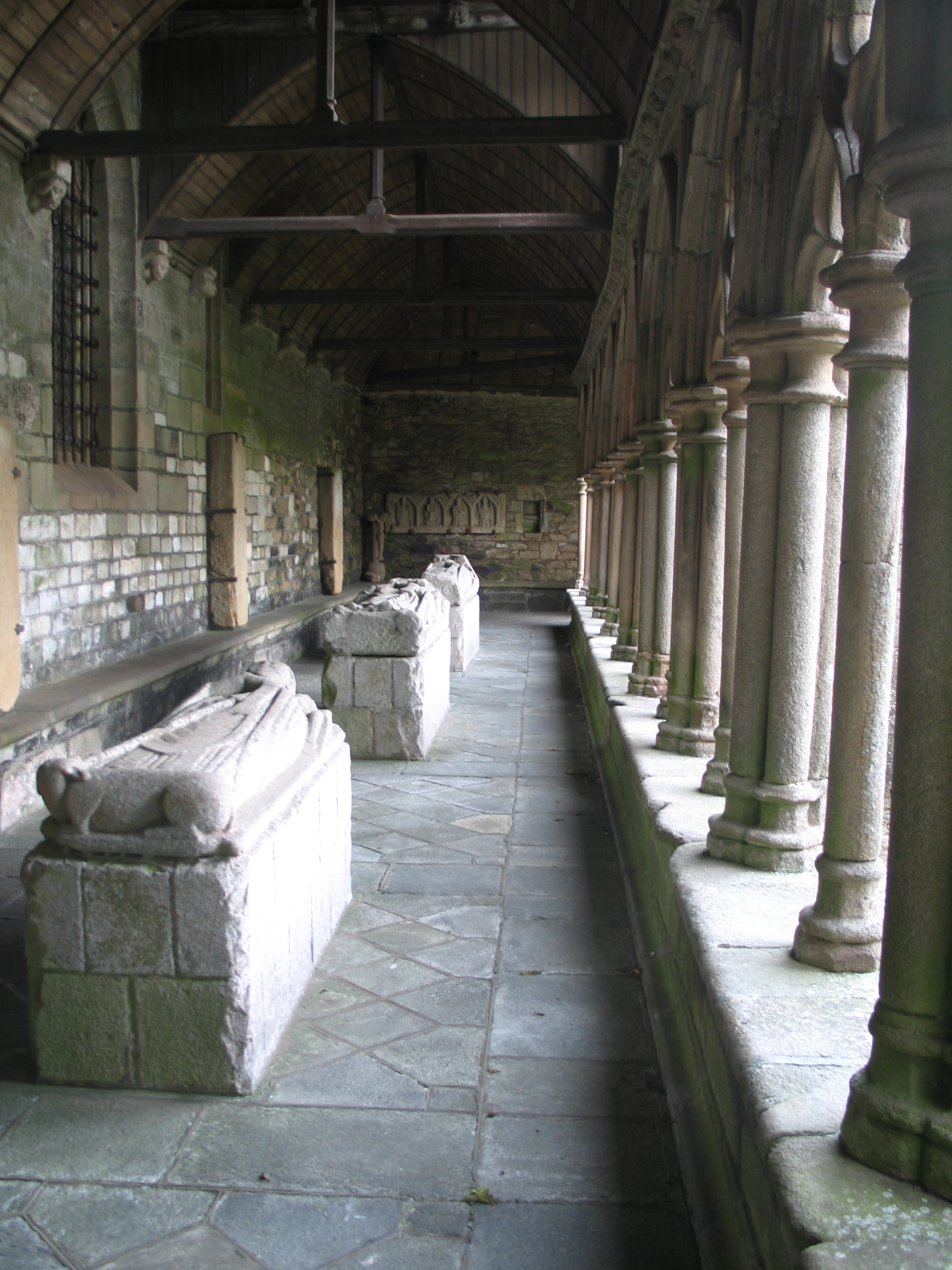
Tombs in the cloister of the Cathédrale Saint-Tugdual de Tréguier

== The tomb of Gilles de la Noé ==
This tomb is located in Ploujean at the Église de Plounez. Gilles de la Noé was the sieur of Couenspeur.

== Bréhant ==
Doré worked on two tombs in Bréhant.

== Non religious works ==
In the grounds of the Trėcesson château at Campénéac are four statues by Roland Dorė. They came originally from the Crėnan château and were purchased for Trėcesson by the compte Henri de Pontbriand. The statues depict two seigneurs and their ladies: Pierre de Perrien and an unidentified woman, possibly his wife Madeleine du Bueil or his sister and Pierre's parents, Maurice de Perrien and his wife Anne Urvoy.

== The historic dioceses of Brittany ==
Below is a map showing the historic dioceses of Brittany.

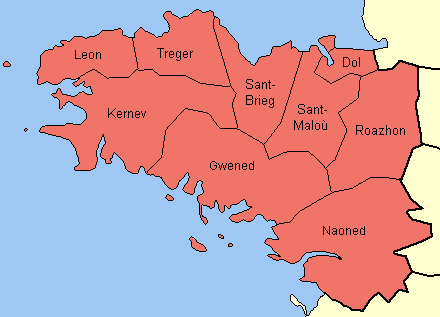
The historic dioceses of Brittany

== Trémaouézan ==
For the Église Notre-Dame in Trémaouézan the Doré atelier executed a statue of the Virgin Mary with child placed in a central niche on the church exterior and the apostles except for Saint Peter which can be seen in the church's south porch.

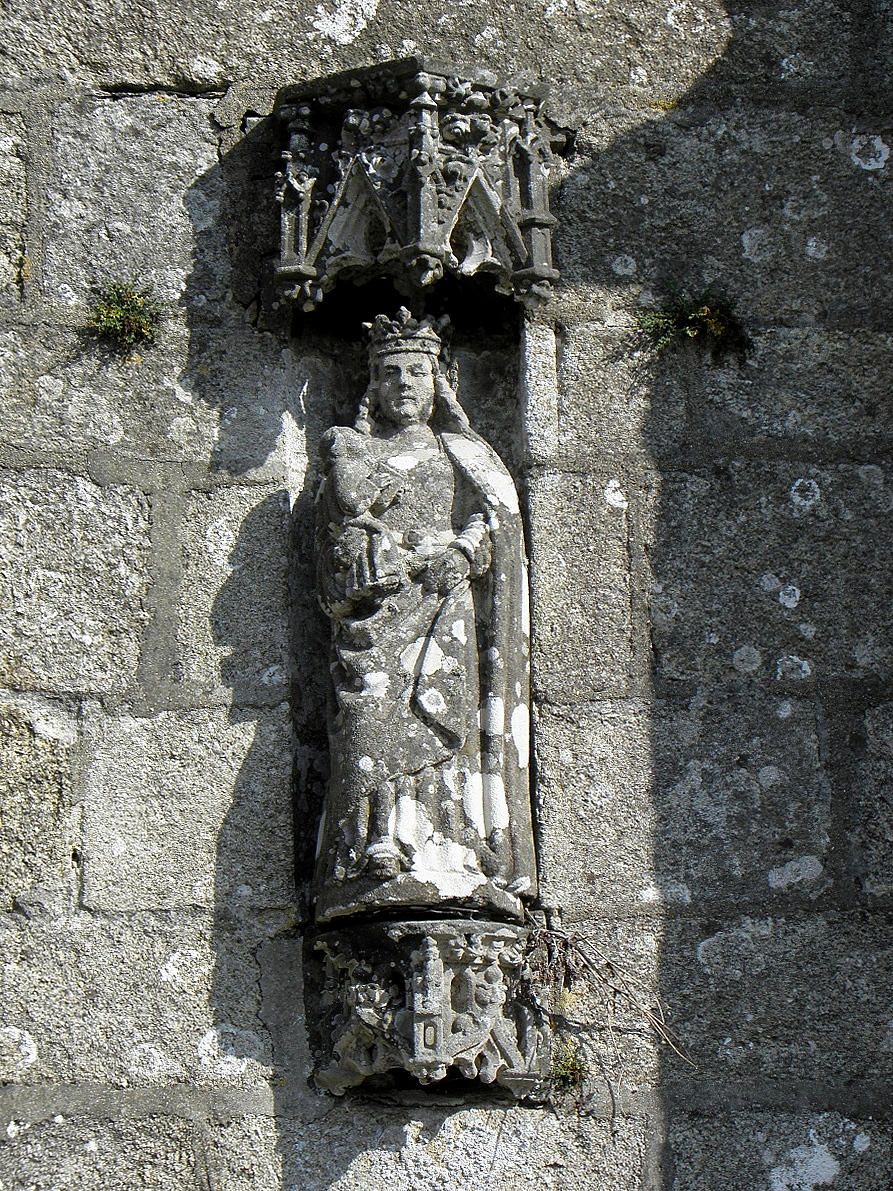
The Virgin Mary with child at Trémaouézan's Église Notre-Dame

== See also ==
- Saint Servais Parish close

== Notes ==
Note 1. The enclos paroissial or parish close is an architectural grouping that is very common in Brittany. Not unlike the concept of the English close, except that the Breton grouping is limited to religious buildings and does not, as is the case in England, include administrative and other buildings. The enclos concept dates to the 16th and 17th century. It includes between five and eight elements all placed within a retaining wall: the church itself and an ossuary or a chapelle reliquaire; a calvary, mostly elaborate, with a depiction of the crucifixion at the top, sometimes with two crosses or gibbets bearing the robbers crucified with Jesus, figures of those who had been present at Jesus' death, and often complemented by statues of other saints and local dignitaries such as bishops; a porte triomphale often in the form of an arc de triomphe; and a cemetery which stood in an area known as the placître. Sometimes the enclos would include a fountain.

Note 2. The Ankou. Ankou’s iconography in sculpture, particularly on ossuaries, shows a skeletal figure, armed with a scythe or arrow and often accompanied by a slogan such as "Je vous tue tous" (I kill you all). In legend, Ankou's head could turn through 360 degrees, so that he never missed anything or anyone – a fact that gives him a reputation of fairness, as everyone must die eventually. He travels at night in a creaking cart drawn by white horses, one fat, one thin, collecting the souls whose time has come and escorting them to another world.
