= Loperhet =

Loperhet Loperc'hed
- Commune
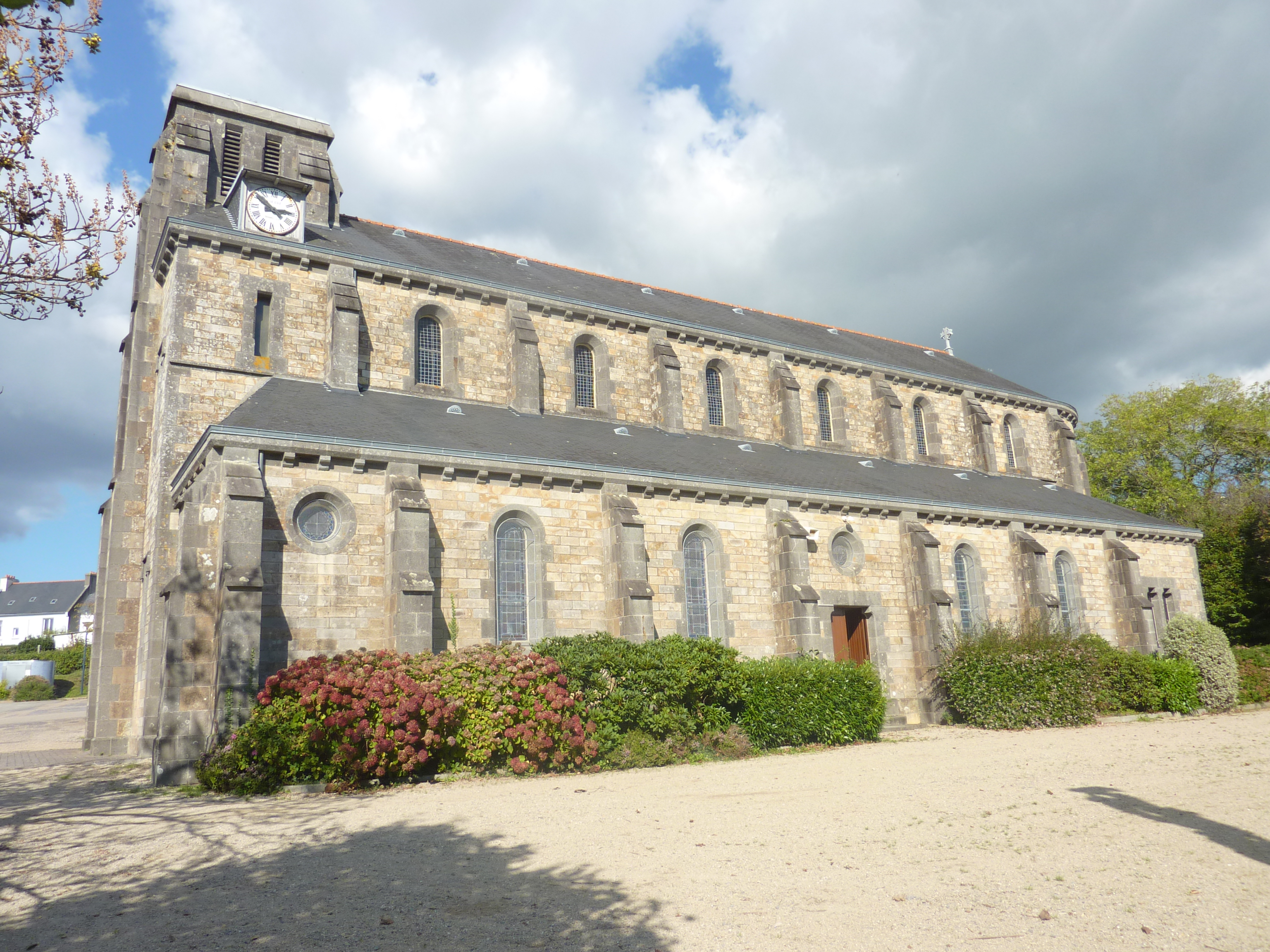
- The parish church of Sainte-Brigitte

- Coat of arms
- Location of Loperhet
- Location within France Location within Brittany
- Coordinates: 48°22′32″N 4°18′14″W
- Country: France
- Region: Brittany
- Department: Finistère
- Arrondissement: Brest
- Canton: Pont-de-Buis-lès-Quimerch
- Intercommunality: CA Pays de Landerneau-Daoulas

Government
  - Mayor (2020–2026): Nathalie Godet
- Area^{1}: 20.31 km^{2} (7.84 sq mi)
- Highest elevation: 162 m (531 ft)
- Lowest elevation: 0 m (0 ft)
- Population (2023): 3,959
  - Density: 194.9/km^{2} (504.9/sq mi)
- Time zone: UTC+01:00 (CET)
  - Summer (DST): UTC+02:00 (CEST)
- INSEE/Postal code: 29140 /29470
- ^{1} French Land Register data, which excludes lakes, ponds, glaciers > 1 km^{2} (0.386 sq mi or 247 acres) and river estuaries.

Loperhet (French pronunciation: [lɔpeʁɛt]; also Lopérhet; Breton: Loperc'hed) is a commune in the Finistère department of Brittany in north-western France.

== Population ==
Inhabitants of Loperhet are called in French Loperhétois.

Historical population
Year	Pop.	±% p.a.
1968	1,315	—
1975	1,411	+1.01%
1982	2,030	+5.33%
1990	2,941	+4.74%
1999	3,466	+1.84%
2007	3,530	+0.23%
2012	3,602	+0.40%
2017	3,760	+0.86%
2023	3,959	+0.86%
Source: INSEE

== Geography ==
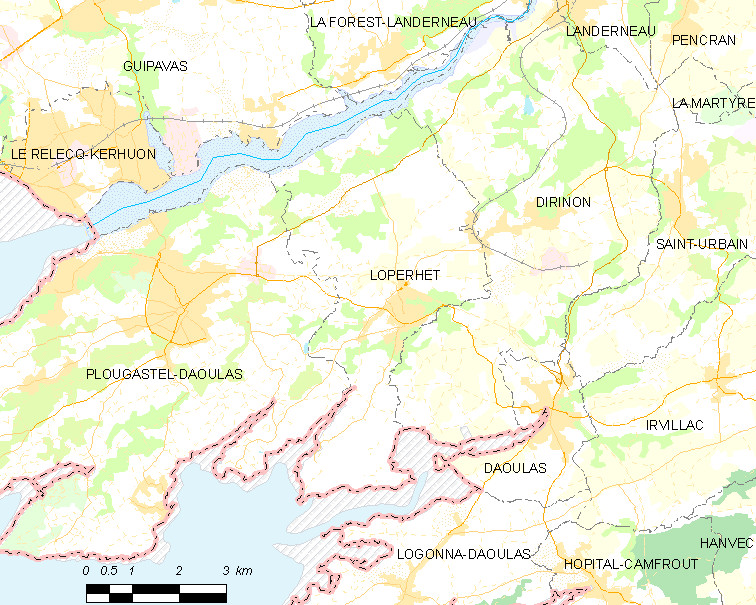
Map of Loperhet

Loperhet is situated between the communes of Dirinon to the east and Plougastel-Daoulas to the west. It is nine kilometers to the southwest of Landerneau and fifteen kilometers southeast of Brest, the largest town in the area. In the north is the river Élorn and in the south is the harbor known as the Roadstead of Brest. Thus, alongside the commune of Plougastel-Daoulas it forms the peninsula of Plougastel. The town is situated at 58 meters above sea level but the commune's territory varies up to 162 meters above sea level. The commune is nearby the Armorica Regional Natural Park, whose northern border is found seven kilometers away.

Situated in the cove of Penfoul, the port of Rostiviec (the name coming from the Celtic or Norse word wic meaning bay) was notable for its fishing industry. In summer, they fished for mackerel and saurel while in winter they dredged for praire clams and St. James scallops. The fishermen were often peasant-sailors who split their time between both activities. Nowadays, recreational boating has almost completely replaced fishing and sand dredging.

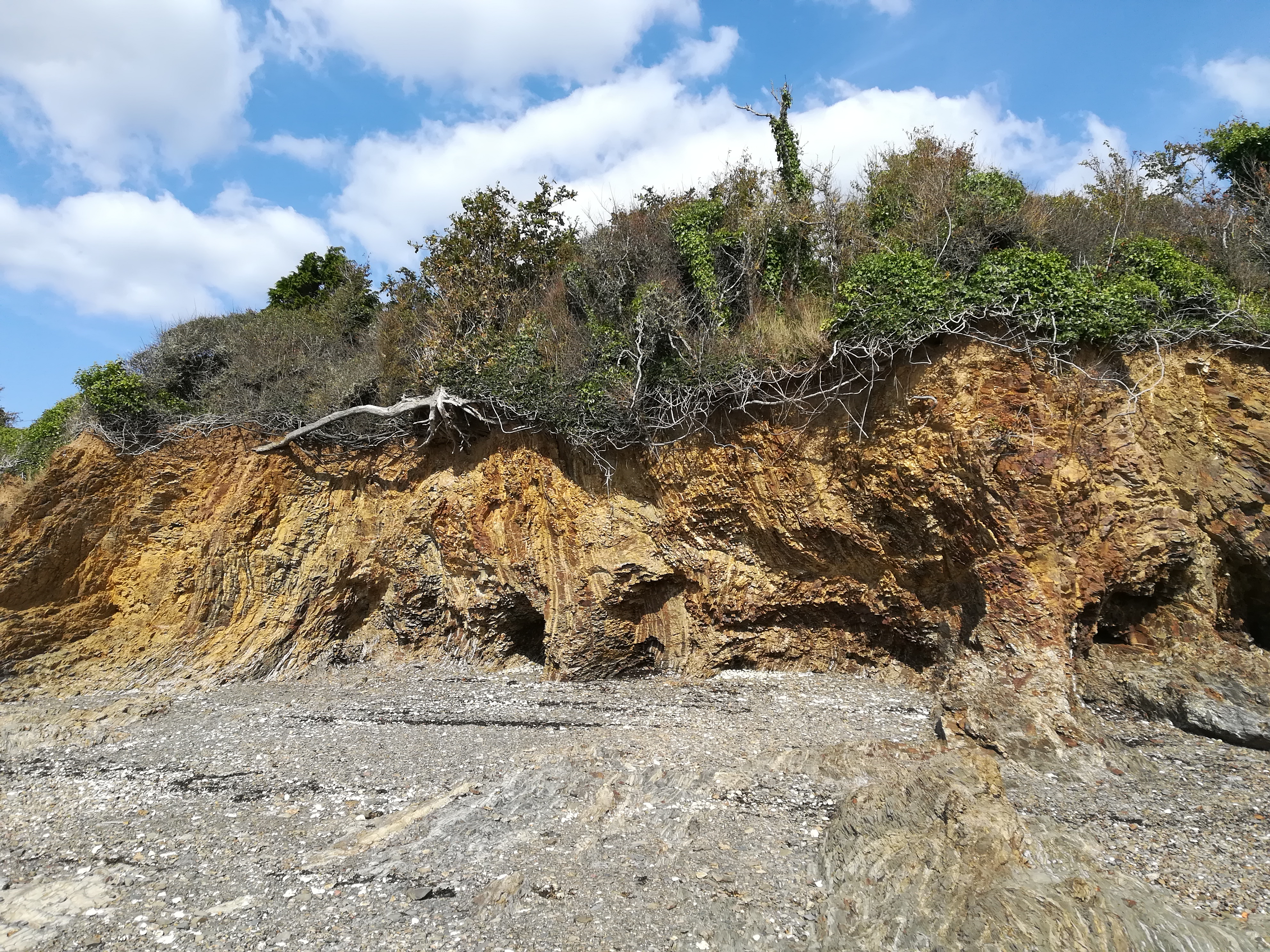
Cliff at Porz Donn.

Geologically, a synclinal basin extends from Loperhet to Plouigneau formed of Devonian-aged schists and quartzites from the Plougastel formation. The coarse schist is green-gray and the quartzite is dark green. It is topped with white sandstone from the Landevennec formation and layers of alternating shales, greywackes, and limestones. Above all is the shales of the Porsguen and Rostellec formations.

== History ==
=== Toponymy ===
The name of Loperhet is attested under the forms ecclesia Loco Sanctae Brigidae in 1218, Loperchet in 1442, Loperguet in 1535, and Locus Brigide in 1574.

The name of the commune in Breton is Loperhed or Loperc'hed. The name of the commune is composed of the Breton words Lok (coming from the Latin Locus meaning "consecrated place") and Berc'het (coming from the Old Irish Brigit, a reference to Saint Brigid of Kildare). Saint Brigid was the patron saint of the parish of Loperhet.

The oldest document mentioning Loperhet dates to 1186. It is a confirmation by Harvey I, Lord of Léon of a land grant made by his father Guihomar IV and his mother Nobilis to the canons of the Abbey of Notre-Dame in Daoulas.

Some 20th century scholars think that the names of Loperhet and of nearby Lopérec come from Loc Pezrec referencing Saint Petroc, a sixth century hermit who lived in an isolated corner of the nearby Cranou forest.

== Breton language ==
The municipality launched a linguistic plan concerning the Breton language through Ya d'ar brezhoneg on 22 October 2008.

In 2008, 14.56% of primary-school children attended bilingual schools.

== See also ==
- Communes of the Finistère department
