= Calvary at Lopérec =

Coordinates: 48.2771°N 4.048°W

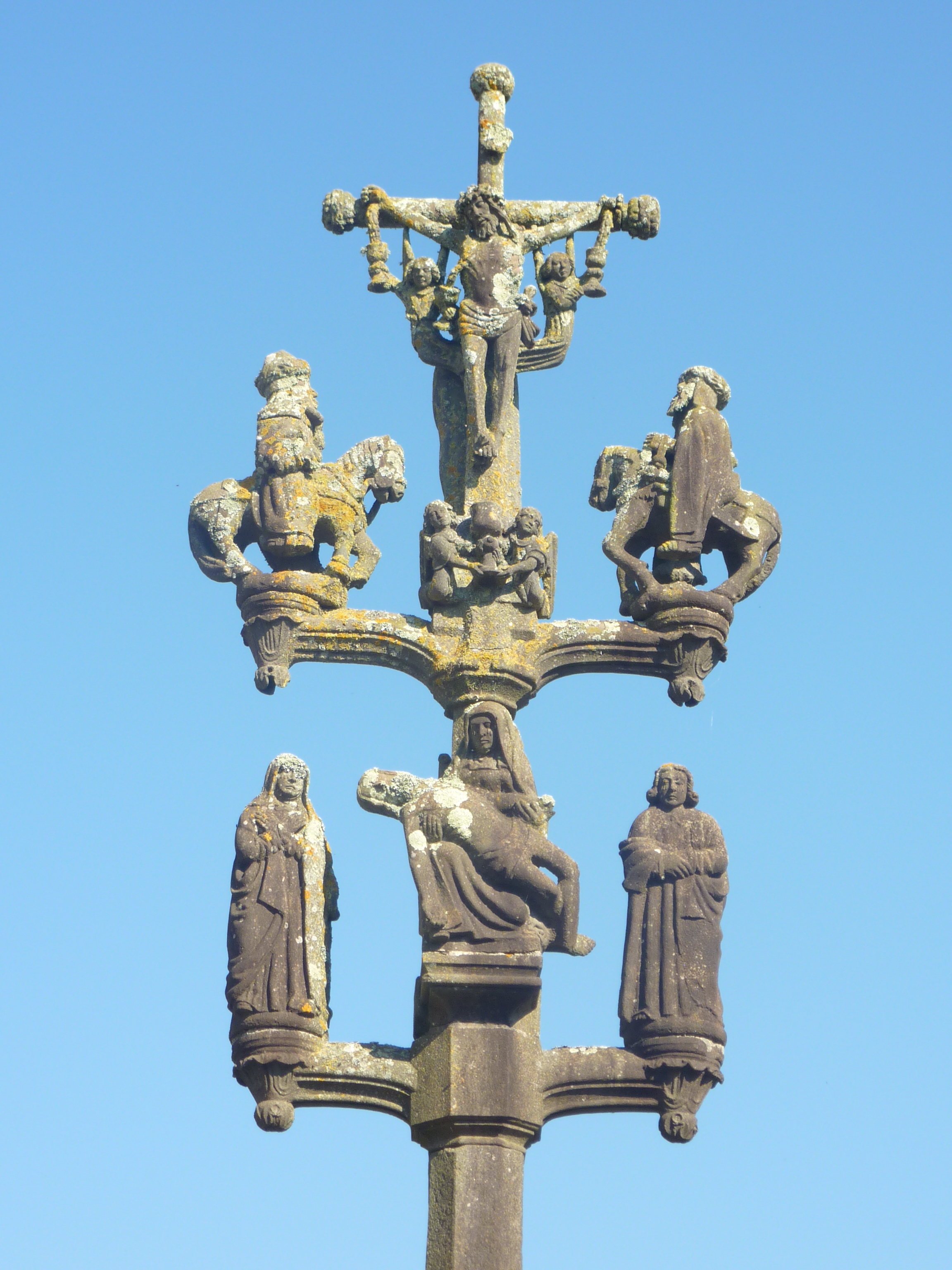
A view of the top of the calvary at Lopérec as seen from the west. We see the crucified Jesus with angels collecting his blood into chalices as it pours from the wounds in his hands and feet. Below we see the two horsed cavaliers and below them a pietà in the centre of the crosspiece with the Virgin Mary on one side and St John on the other.

The Calvary at Lopérec in the Châteaulin arrondissement in Brittany dates to 1552 and apart from some bas-reliefs around the pedestal was the work of the sculptor Fayet.

== Background and description of the calvary ==
The calvary stands in the parish church's cemetery and comprises a square pedestal, decorated with four bas-reliefs, from which rises a cross depicting the crucifixion. The cross has two crosspieces and at its base is a statue depicting Mary Magdalene kneeling in prayer on one side and Francis of Assisi showing his stigmata on the reverse side. On the higher crosspiece and just below the depiction of the crucifixion are two horsed cavaliers, one on each side. One of these is Saint Longinus who raises a finger to his eye to remind the observer that he was cured by Jesus of blindness. On the reverse of the crucifixion there is a "Ecce Homo". As part of the crucifixion, four angels are depicted collecting the blood from Jesus' wounds into chalices, On the second crosspiece below are some back-to-back statues ("statues géminées") of the Virgin Mary and John the Evangelist, these on either side of a pietà ("Notre Dame de Pitié" or "Vierge de Pitié") on one side and a depiction of the resurrected Jesus ("Christ ressuscité") on the other side, set between depictions of St Peter and Mary Magdalene. The calvary was the work of a sculptor called Fayet who worked for the Henry and Bastien Prigent workshop between 1552 and 1563. Fayet is not attributed with the pedestal and it's bas-reliefs. Originally there were crosses bearing the good and bad robbers but what remains of them are now kept in the nearby church.

The letters "I.N.R.I" are inscribed above the depiction of the crucifixion and there is also an inscription on the calvary reading

CESTE:CROIX: FUST FAYTE :EN : LAN: MVc LVII1

The structure is 6 metres high. The Calvary was moved back to its original position to the south of the church after a temporary transfer to the cemetery in 1883. The Calvary suffered damage during a storm in 1987 and was reassembled in 1989. The Calvary was listed as a "Monument Historique" on 5 May 1930.

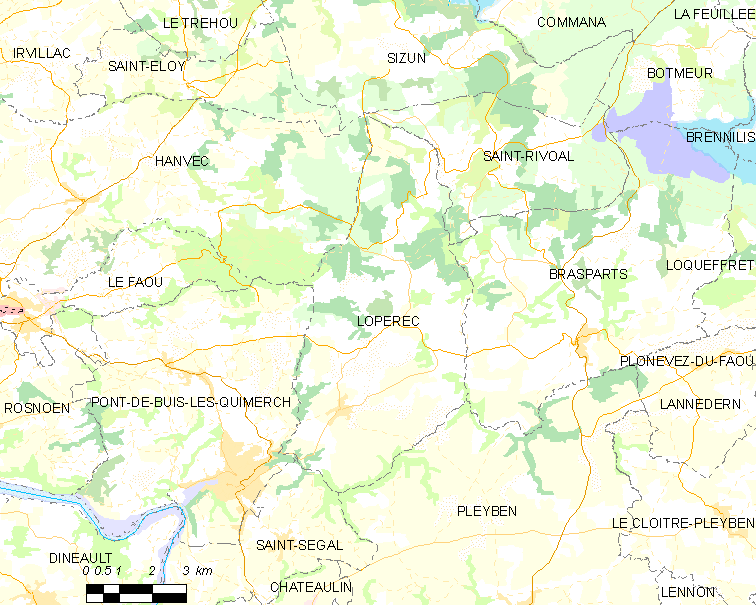
Map showing location of Lopérec

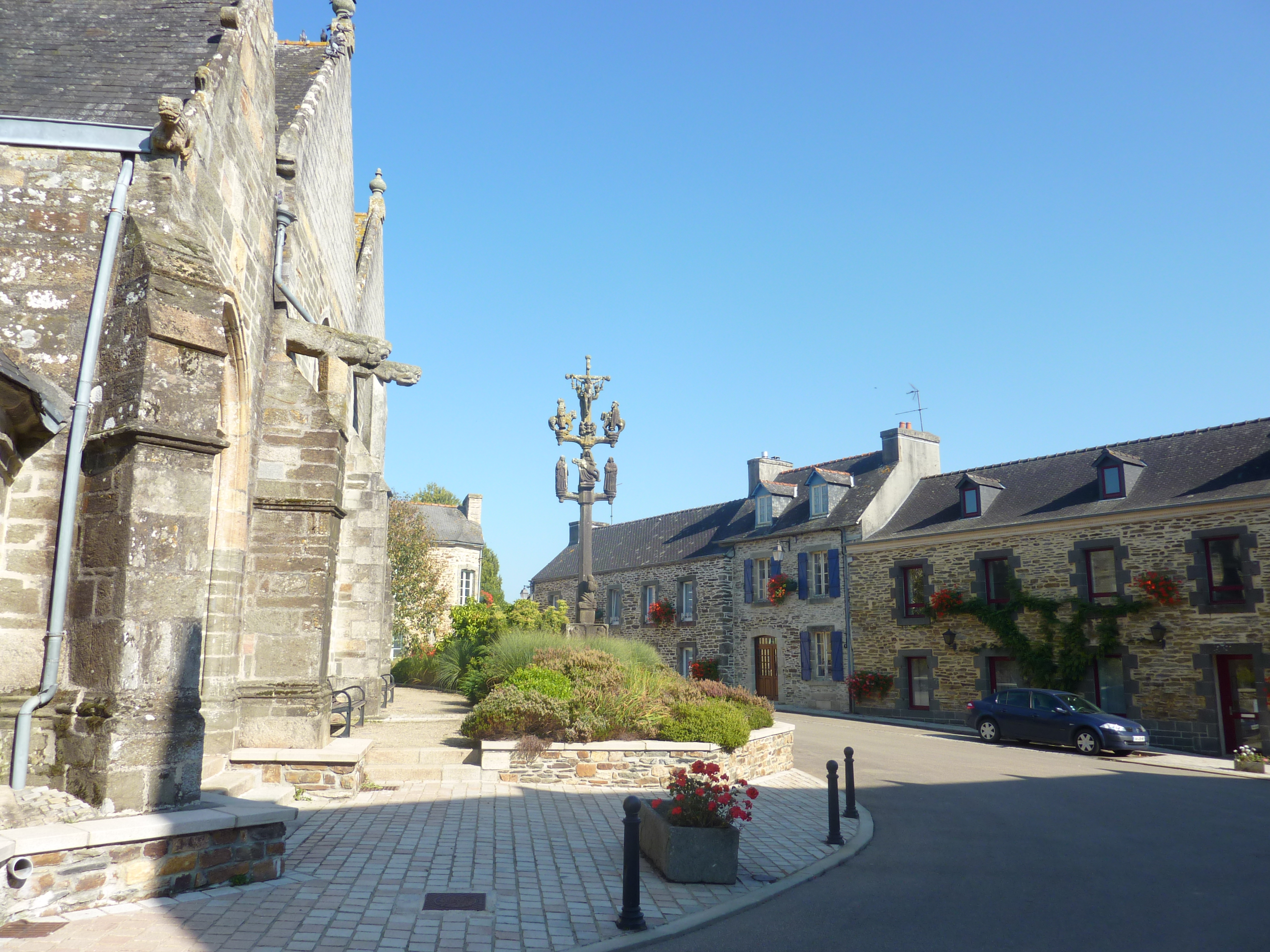
The calvary and church

== The bas-reliefs around the pedestal ==
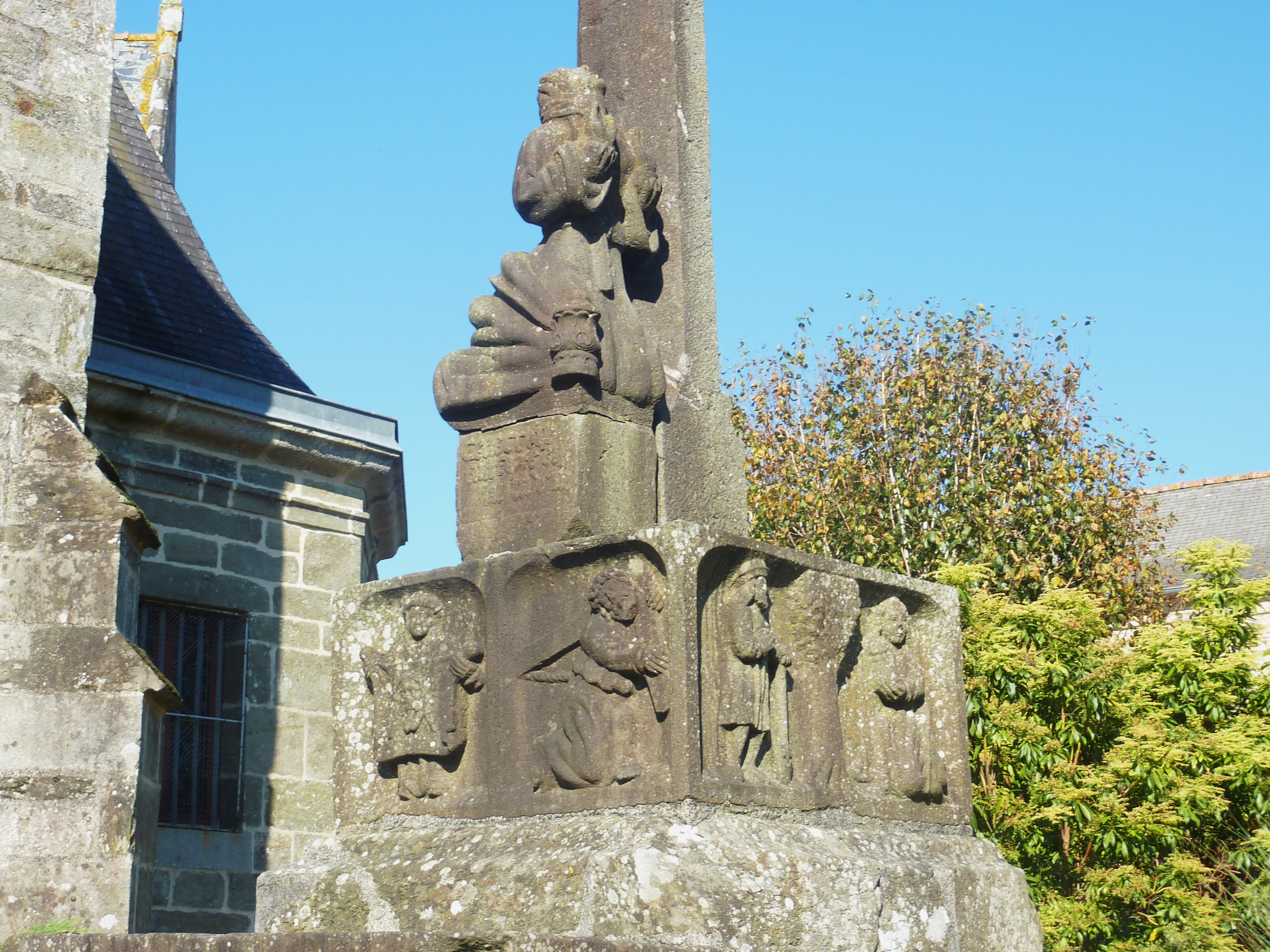
The bas reliefs at the base.

The four bas-reliefs that are on the west face include a depiction of St Veronica with her veil which carries an image of Jesus' face and a depiction of the carrying of the cross. The bas-relief on the south face depicts Mary Magdalene meeting with Jesus after his resurrection. The other two bas-reliefs depict the four Evangelists. The bas-reliefs were not the work of Fayet.

== Notes ==
Note 1: Fayet is also credited with having executed the upper section of the calvary at Laz in 1563 and a statue of Jesus Christ at Coat-Nant in Irvillac near the Notre-Dame de Lorette chapel.
