= Saint-Eloy, Finistère =

Saint-Eloy Sant-Alar
- Commune
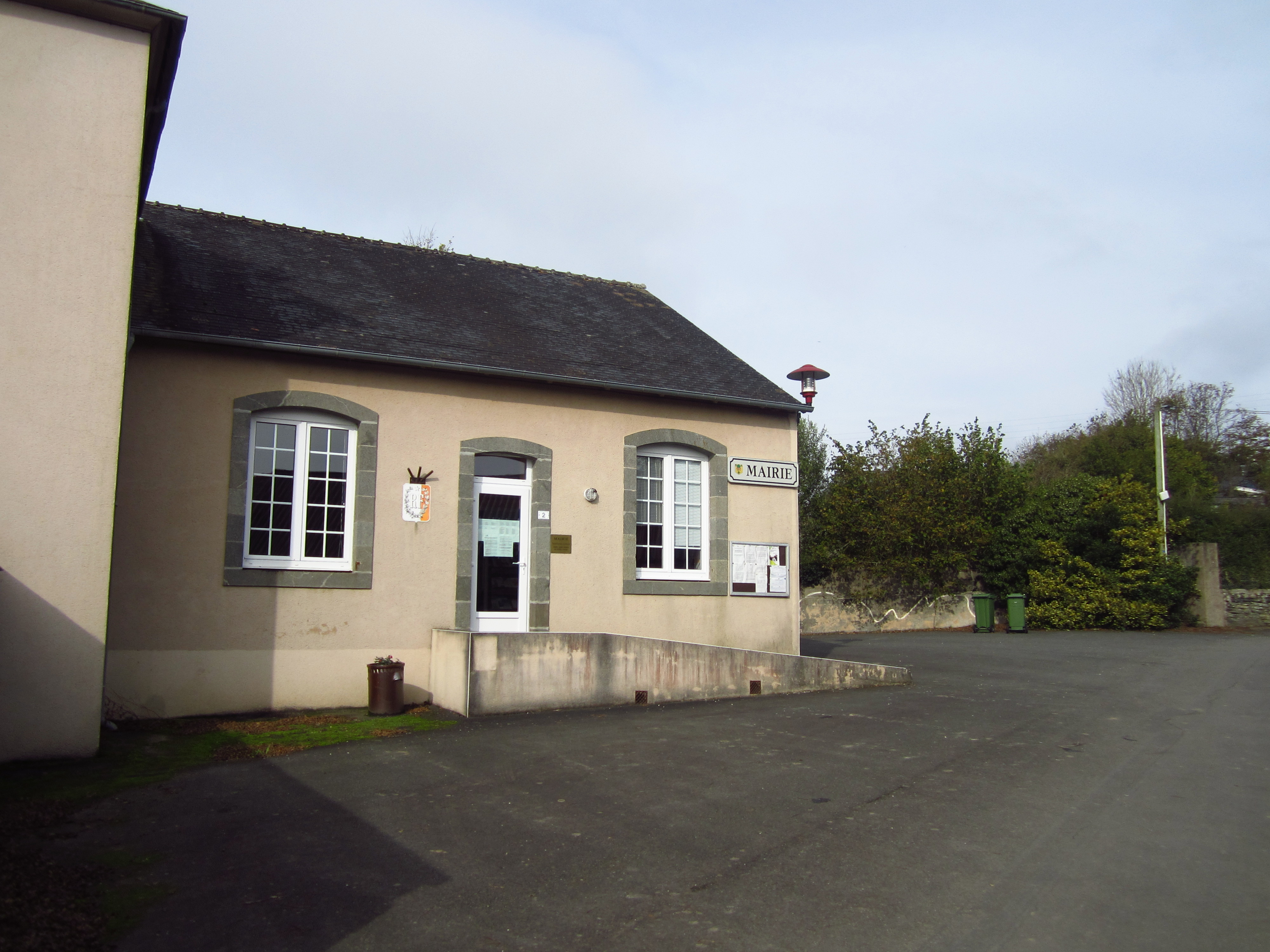
- The town hall in Saint-Eloy

- Coat of arms
- Location of Saint-Eloy
- Location within France Location within Brittany
- Coordinates: 48°21′44″N 4°07′16″W
- Country: France
- Region: Brittany
- Department: Finistère
- Arrondissement: Brest
- Canton: Pont-de-Buis-lès-Quimerch
- Intercommunality: CA Pays de Landerneau-Daoulas

Government
  - Mayor (2020–2026): Renaud Grall
- Area^{1}: 12.42 km^{2} (4.80 sq mi)
- Highest elevation: 298 m (978 ft)
- Lowest elevation: 65 m (213 ft)
- Population (2023): 220
  - Density: 18/km^{2} (46/sq mi)
- Time zone: UTC+01:00 (CET)
  - Summer (DST): UTC+02:00 (CEST)
- INSEE/Postal code: 29246 /29460
- ^{1} French Land Register data, which excludes lakes, ponds, glaciers > 1 km^{2} (0.386 sq mi or 247 acres) and river estuaries.

Saint-Eloy (French pronunciation: [sɛ̃.t‿elwa]; Breton: Sant-Alar) is a commune in the Finistère department of Brittany in north-western France.

== History ==
In 1521, the monks of the Abbey of Daoulas, fleeing the plague, took refuge in Fresq (former name of the town) and build a chapel there, which stood today as the church of Saint-Eloy. The name Saint-Eloy came from Saint Eligius.

== Sights ==
- Arboretum du Cranou

== See also ==
- Communes of the Finistère department
- Parc naturel régional d'Armorique
