= La Martyre =

La Martyre Ar Merzher-Salaun
- Commune
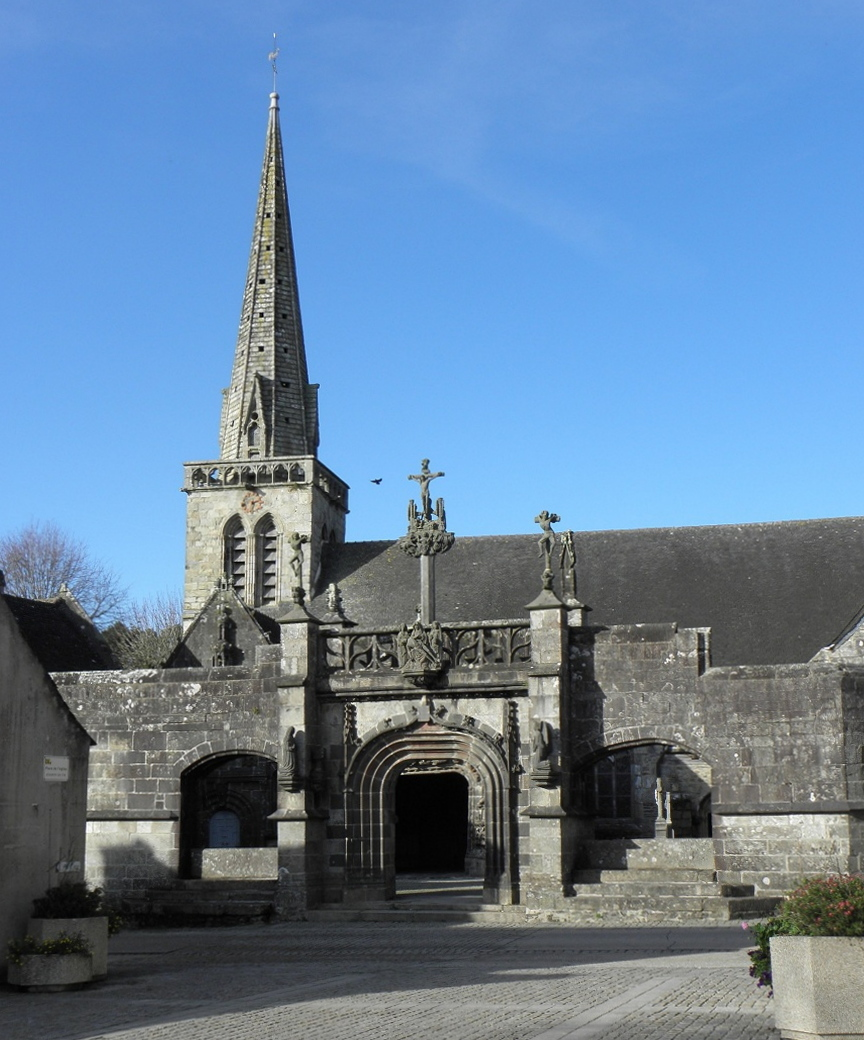
- The church in La Martyre

- Coat of arms
- Location of La Martyre
- Location within France Location within Brittany
- Coordinates: 48°26′59″N 4°09′29″W
- Country: France
- Region: Brittany
- Department: Finistère
- Arrondissement: Brest
- Canton: Pont-de-Buis-lès-Quimerch
- Intercommunality: CA Pays de Landerneau-Daoulas

Government
  - Mayor (2020–2026): Chantal Soudon
- Area^{1}: 18.01 km^{2} (6.95 sq mi)
- Highest elevation: 191 m (627 ft)
- Lowest elevation: 49 m (161 ft)
- Population (2023): 751
  - Density: 41.7/km^{2} (108/sq mi)
- Time zone: UTC+01:00 (CET)
  - Summer (DST): UTC+02:00 (CEST)
- INSEE/Postal code: 29144 /29800
- ^{1} French Land Register data, which excludes lakes, ponds, glaciers > 1 km^{2} (0.386 sq mi or 247 acres) and river estuaries.

La Martyre (French pronunciation: [la maʁtiʁ]; Ar Merzer in Breton) is a commune in the Finistère department of Brittany in northwestern France.

== Population ==
Inhabitants of La Martyre are called in French Martyriens.

== Sights ==
The village of La Martyre has one of the oldest parish palisades (fr), whose construction was undertaken between the 11th and 17th centuries.

== History ==
The village owes its name to the assassination on 25 June 874 of King Salomon of Brittany, who had sought refuge in the village church. The church was called "la Martyre" (Ar Merzher, the Martyr) after its desecration, and the name was taken up by the village. As for the king, he was canonised in 910 for his martyrdom and his virtues.

In the Middle Ages, a prestigious tulle fair took place in La Martyre. In the 15th and 16th centuries this fair saw the most activity. Legend has it that the father of William Shakespeare used to frequent these fairs, which no longer take place.

== See also ==
- Communes of the Finistère department
- List of the works of the Maître de Plougastel
- La Martyre Parish close
- List of works of the two Folgoët ateliers
