= Saint-Urbain, Finistère =

Saint-Urbain Lannurvan
- Commune
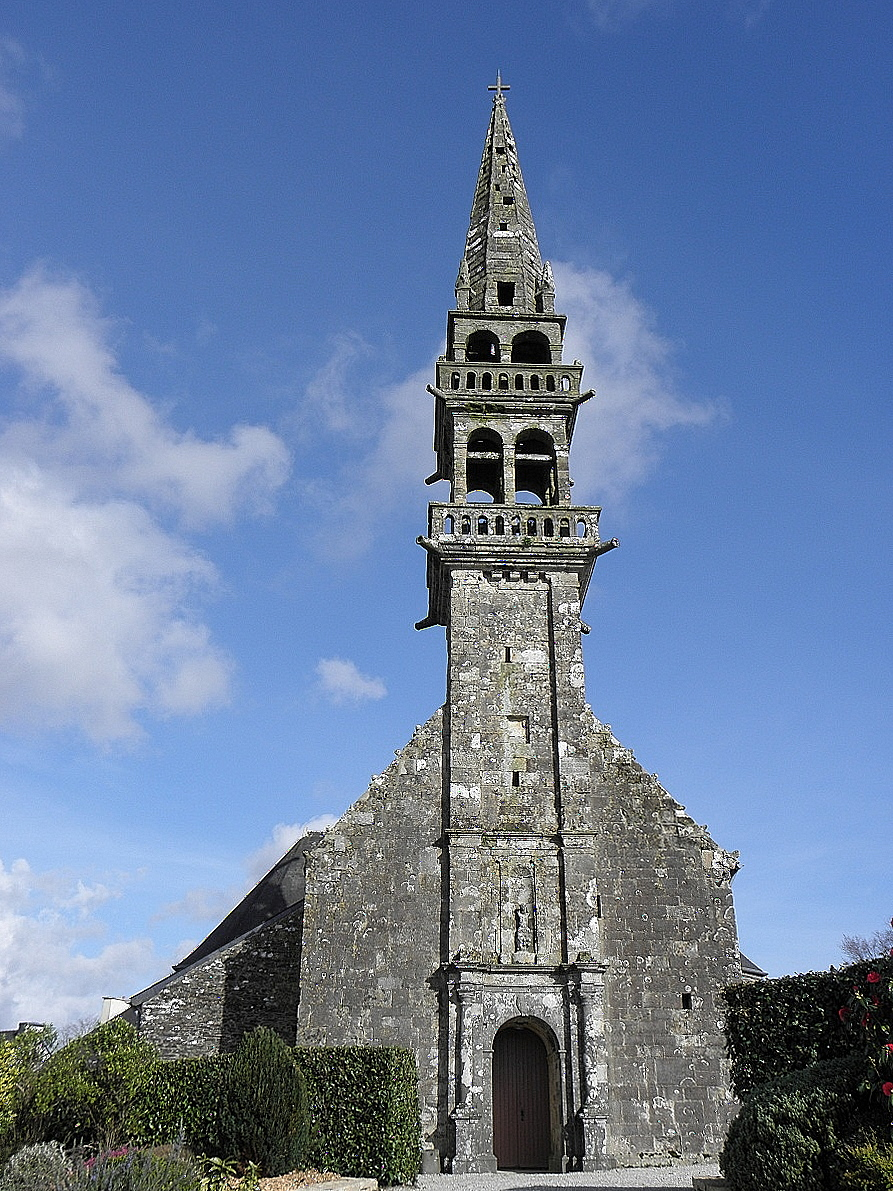
- The church in Saint-Urbain
- Location of Saint-Urbain
- Location within France Location within Brittany
- Coordinates: 48°24′04″N 4°13′30″W
- Country: France
- Region: Brittany
- Department: Finistère
- Arrondissement: Brest
- Canton: Pont-de-Buis-lès-Quimerch
- Intercommunality: CA Pays de Landerneau-Daoulas

Government
  - Mayor (2020–2026): Julien Poupon
- Area^{1}: 15.21 km^{2} (5.87 sq mi)
- Highest elevation: 178 m (584 ft)
- Lowest elevation: 2 m (6.6 ft)
- Population (2023): 1,670
  - Density: 110/km^{2} (284/sq mi)
- Time zone: UTC+01:00 (CET)
  - Summer (DST): UTC+02:00 (CEST)
- INSEE/Postal code: 29270 /29800
- ^{1} French Land Register data, which excludes lakes, ponds, glaciers > 1 km^{2} (0.386 sq mi or 247 acres) and river estuaries.

Saint-Urbain (French pronunciation: [sɛ̃.t‿yʁbɛ̃]; Breton: Lannurvan) is a commune in the Finistère department of Brittany in north-western France.

== Population ==
Historical population
Year	Pop.	±% p.a.
1968	466	—
1975	583	+3.25%
1982	1,062	+8.95%
1990	1,120	+0.67%
1999	1,200	+0.77%
2007	1,411	+2.05%
2012	1,565	+2.09%
2017	1,633	+0.85%
2023	1,670	+0.37%
Source: INSEE

Inhabitants of Saint-Urbain are called in French Saint-Urbannais.

== See also ==
- Communes of the Finistère department
- List of the works of the Maître de Plougastel
- Roland Doré sculptor Sculptor of Saint Urbain Calvary
