= Le Tréhou Parish close =

Coordinates: 48.3938°N 4.1320°W

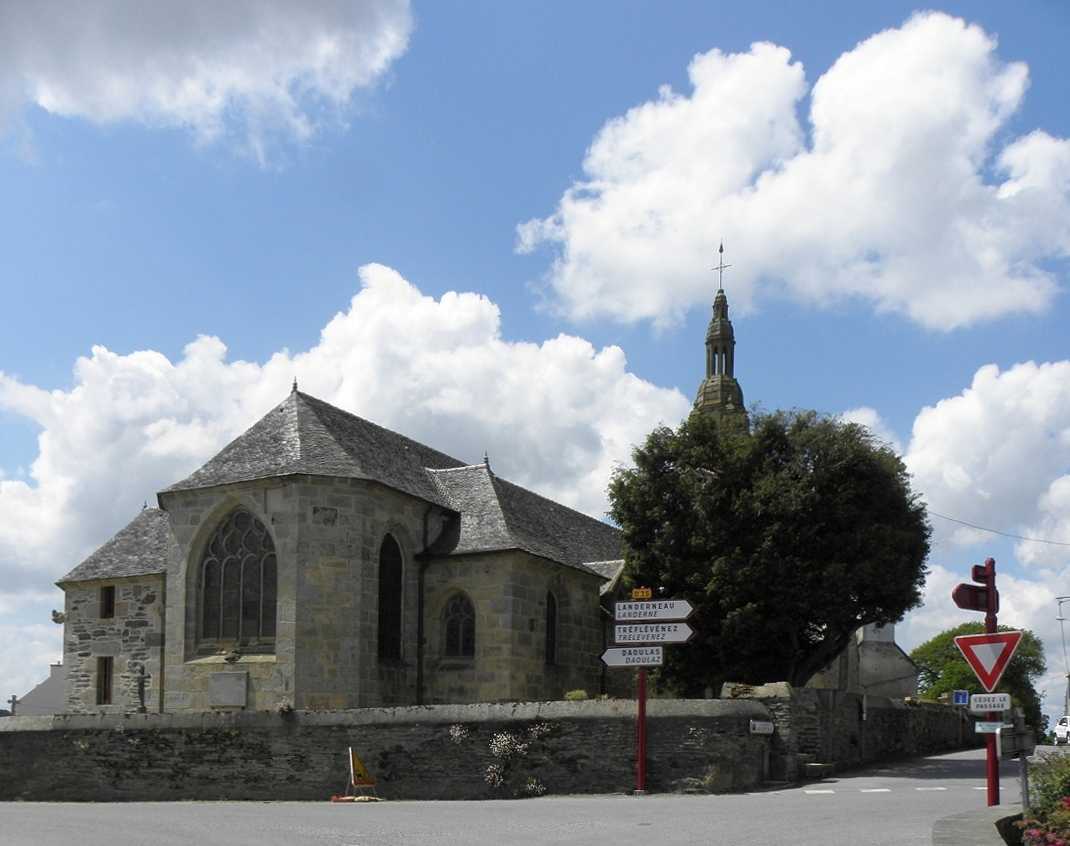
View of chevet at the rear of the Église Sainte-Pitère

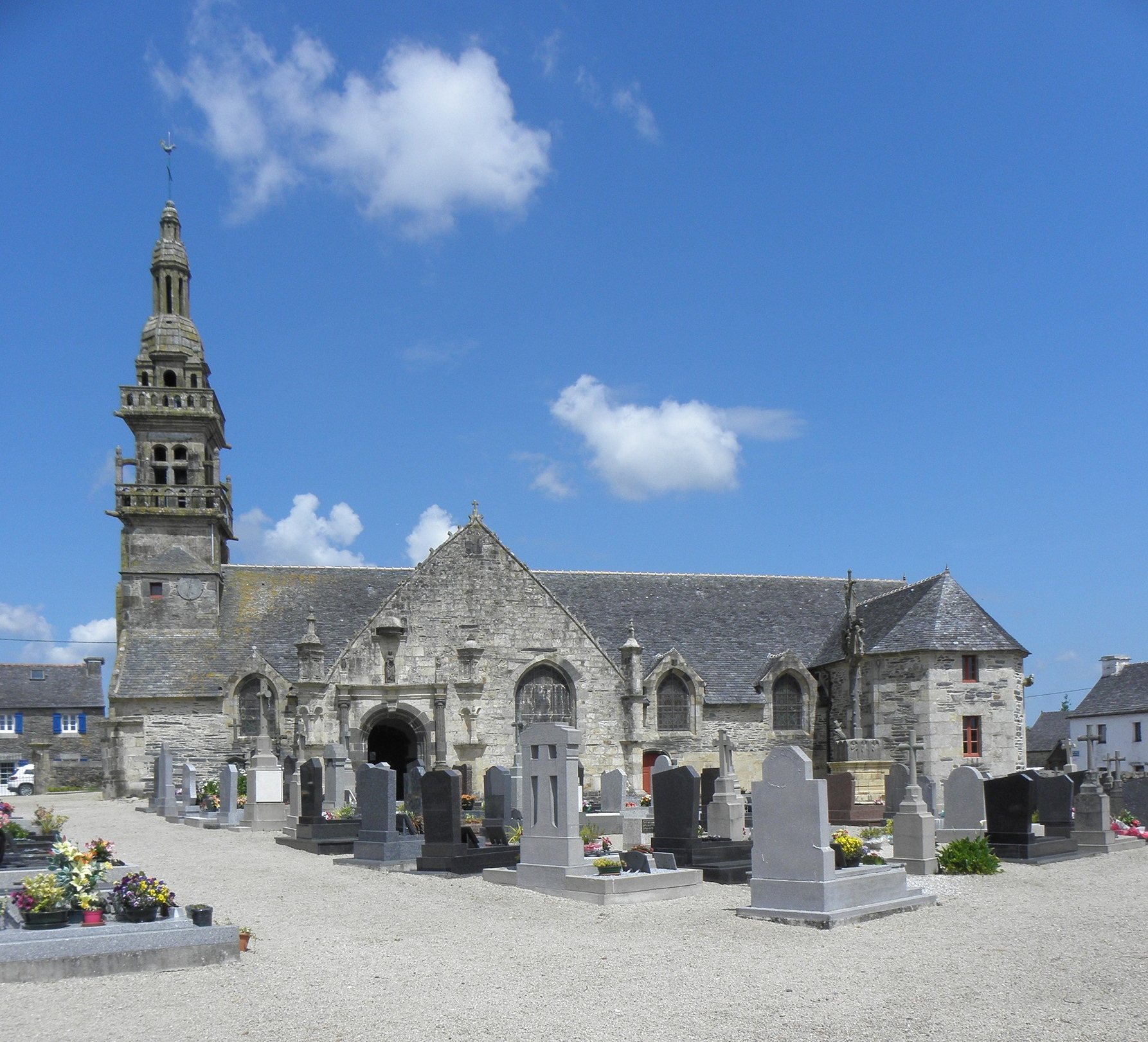
View from south side of the Église Sainte-Pitère

The Le Tréhou Parish close (Enclos paroissial) is located at Le Tréhou in the arrondissement of Brest in Brittany in north-western France. The parish close was first established in 1555 then reconstructed in the 17th century and reworked in the 18th century. The church, the Église Sainte-Pitère, is dedicated to Saint Pitère (or Saint Pithère or Saint Piterre) and is shaped in the form of a Latin cross. The south porch was added in 1610, with a statue of Saint Pitère over the entrance. The nave has six transepts and aisles with two lateral chapels forming a faux transept. The enclos paroissial is distinguished first and foremost by the architectural quality of the church with its 1649 Renaissance double-galleried bell tower. The calvary is a listed historical monument since 1926.

== Statues ==
On a pedestal by the second column in the nave on the Evangelist side there is a 1527 Kersanton stone version of Ecce Homo, whilst in a corner of the choir on the Epistle side there is a wooden statue depicting Saint Pithère, one of many statues of the saint in the church. The friezes completing the decoration of the church's side porch date to 1610. Other statues include those of Saint Mélar, Saint Roch, Saint Sébastien and Saint Yves. There are also wooden statuettes of Saint Joseph, Saint Etienne, Saint Eloi and Saint Herbot.

== The south porch ==
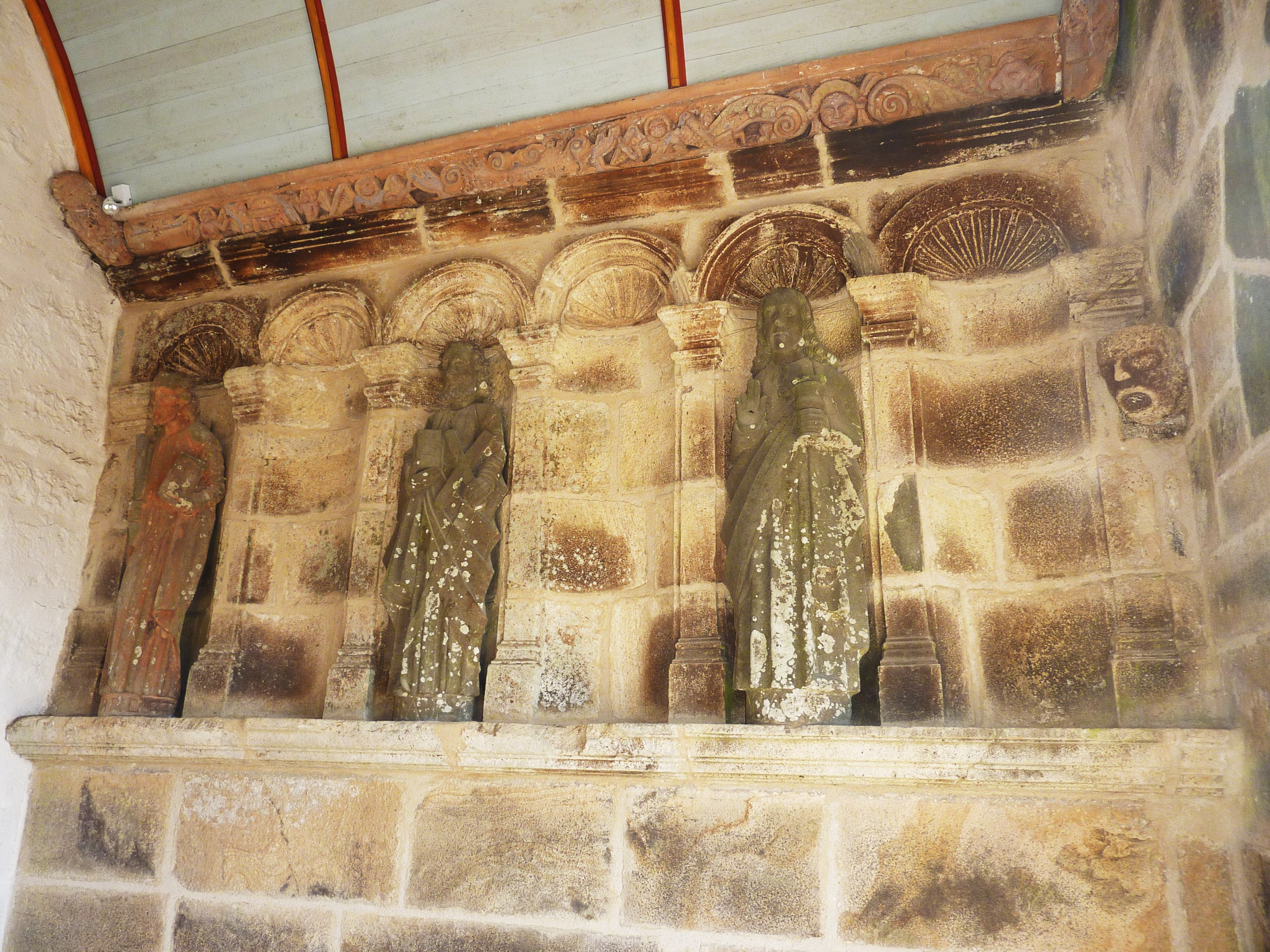
Statues of Saints Peter, Andrew and John

This dates to 1610. There are twelve niches in the porch with only five now having statues in them. Four depict the apostles. In the first niche on the left of the eastern side of the porch is a statue of Saint Peter. It is inscribed with the donor's name "ALAIN:BREST". In the third niche on the left of the eastern side of the porch is a statue of John the Evangelist, this inscribed "Y:M:A:F:F:C:I:". In the fifth niche on the left of the eastern side is a statue of Andrew the Apostle inscribed "F:B:A:F:FD:" and finally on the west side in the third niche from the left is a depiction of Thomas the Apostle. The donor is not indicated. Then in the fifth niche on the left of the western side of the porch there is a statue of Jesus Christ (Christ sauveur). The inscription here is "G:B:A:F:C:I:" All are in Kersanton stone and all came from Roland Doré's workshop.

== The "Rosary" altarpiece ==
The altarpiece in the Rosary Chapel has a painting in the centre depicting Christ and his mother handing the rosary to Saint Dominic and Saint Catherine and a little higher up the same theme is depicted in stone, the statues being very large. Below, in the antependium, there is a bas-relief depicting the Annunciation.

== External decoration ==
The church has some interesting external decoration. Two examples are shown below.

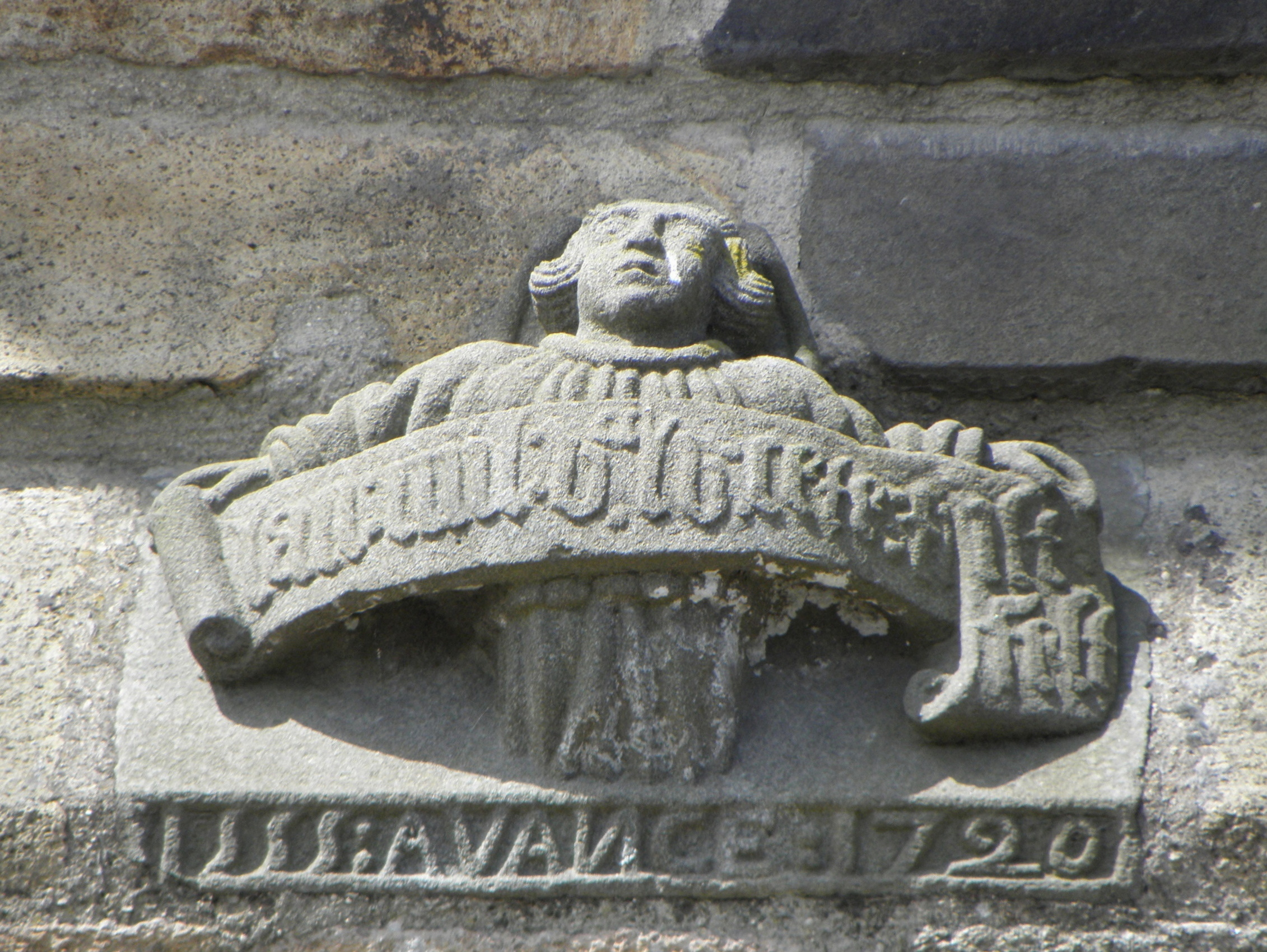
In this carving on the chevet an angel holds a phylactery

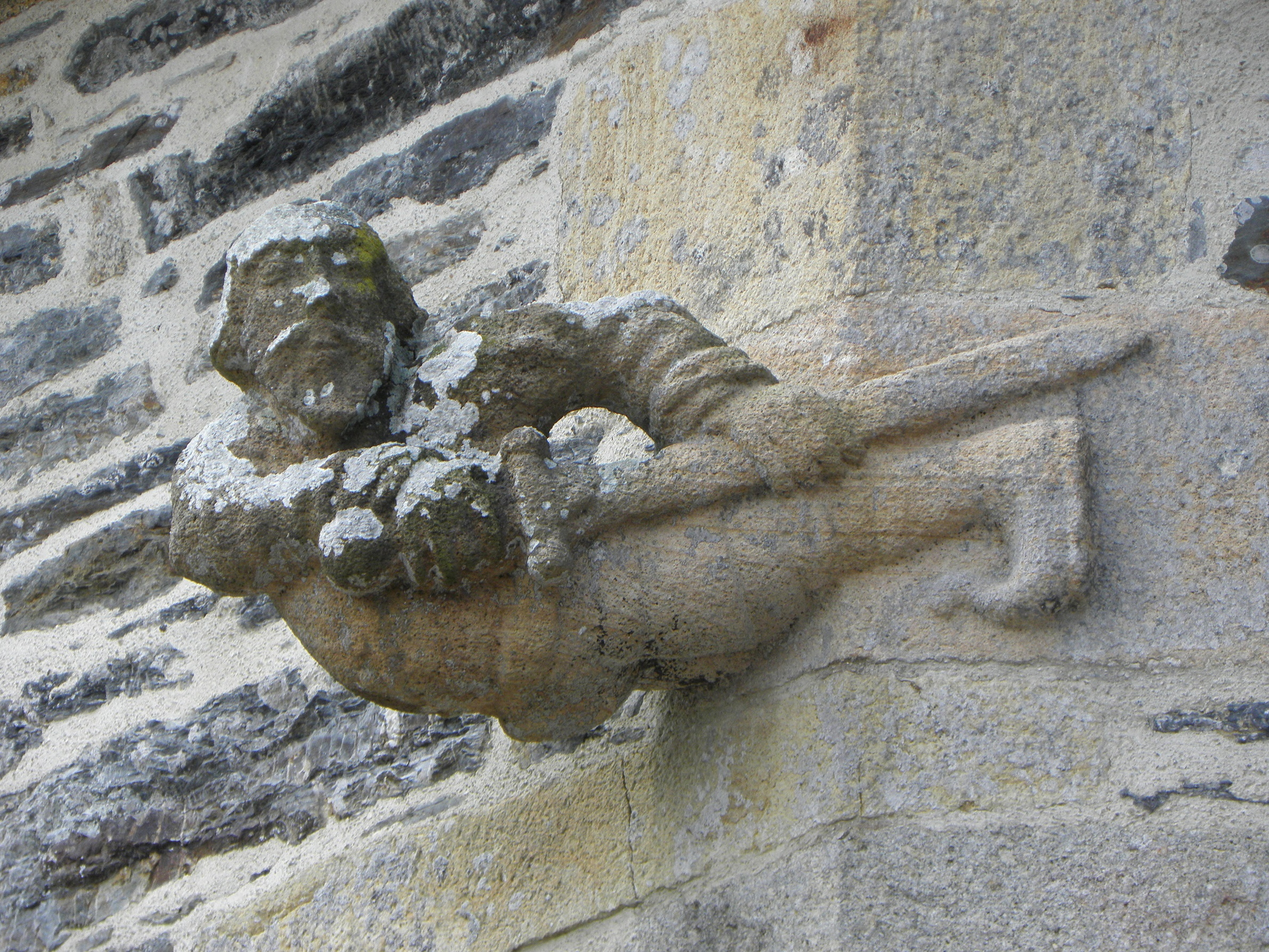
One of the unusual gargoyles decorating the church. A cavalier draws his sword.

== The Le Tréhou calvary ==
The calvary dates to 1578 and stands on a square block of yellowish Logonna stone which could have served as a table to receive offerings (table d’offrande) but a smaller square stands on it and carries bas-relief carvings depicting the apostles, each with his attribute. The cross rises from this smaller square, the shaft bearing the small nodules meant to simulate the bubons or boils which were a symptom of the bubonic plague. Such crosses were invariably erected to mark the end of an epidemic of this disease. In an unusual construction, the crosses of the two robbers crucified with Jesus are shown under the cross bearing Jesus. At the base of the cross there is a statue of Mary Magdalene who is on her knees praying and looking up to the crucified Jesus who hangs from his cross at the top of the shaft. Other statues include Saint Pitère, a pietà and Saint Peter. A demon hovers near the bad robber, waiting to take his soul to hell whilst an angel is near to the good robber who clearly can expect a more acceptable fate. Some photographs of the calvary are shown here.

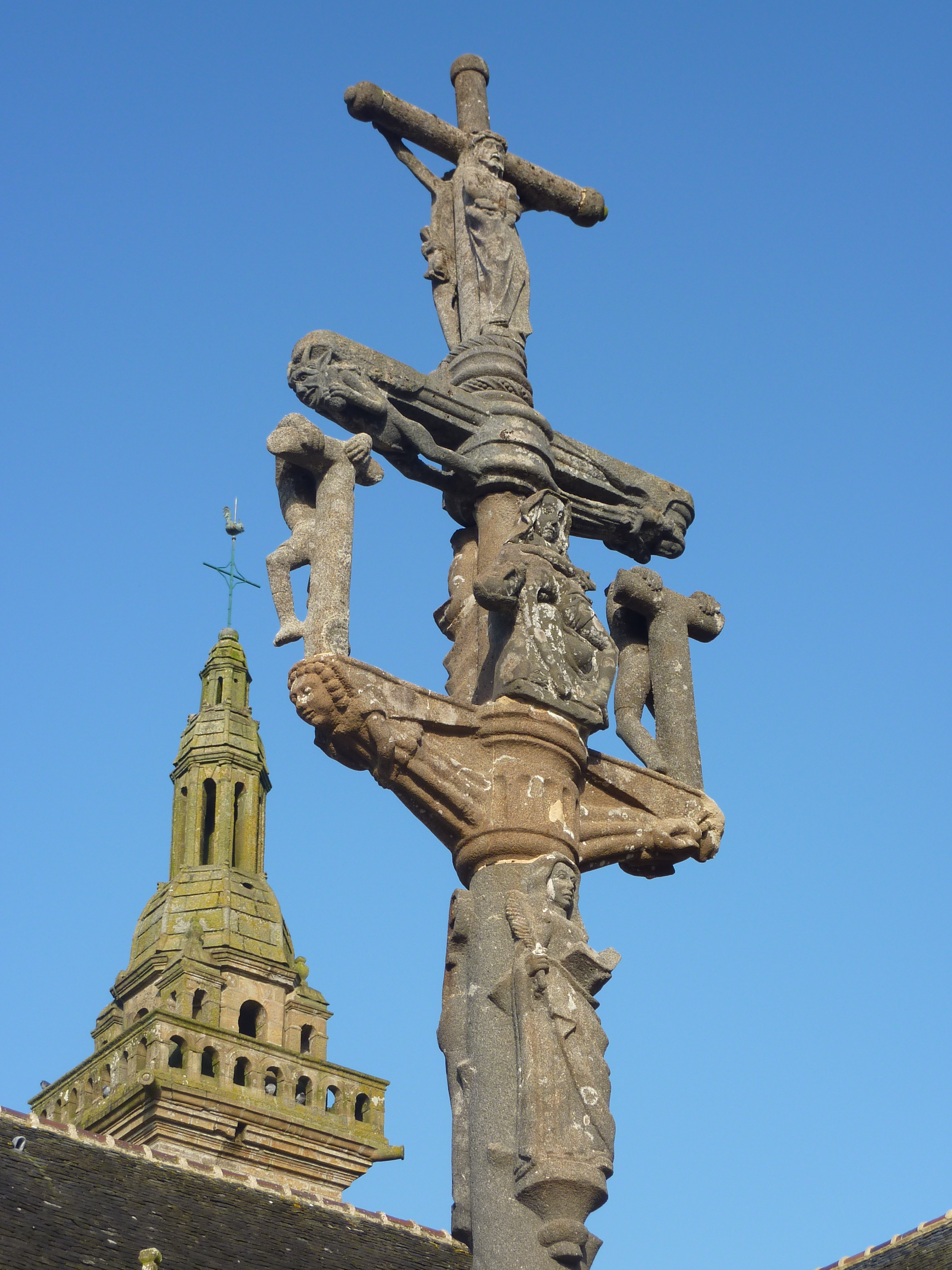
View from the reverse side of the cross

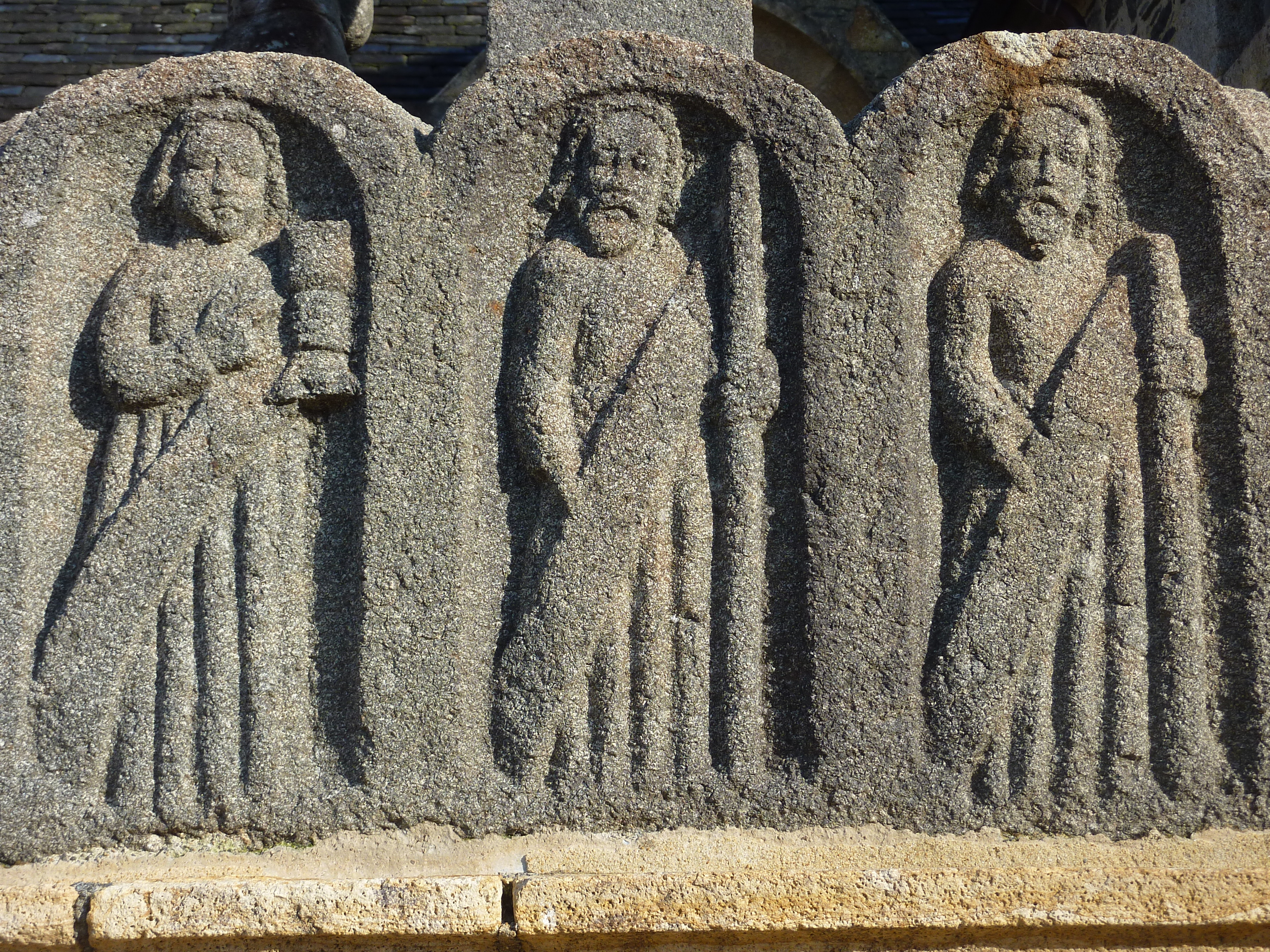
Three of the bas-reliefs depicting the apostles at the base of the cross

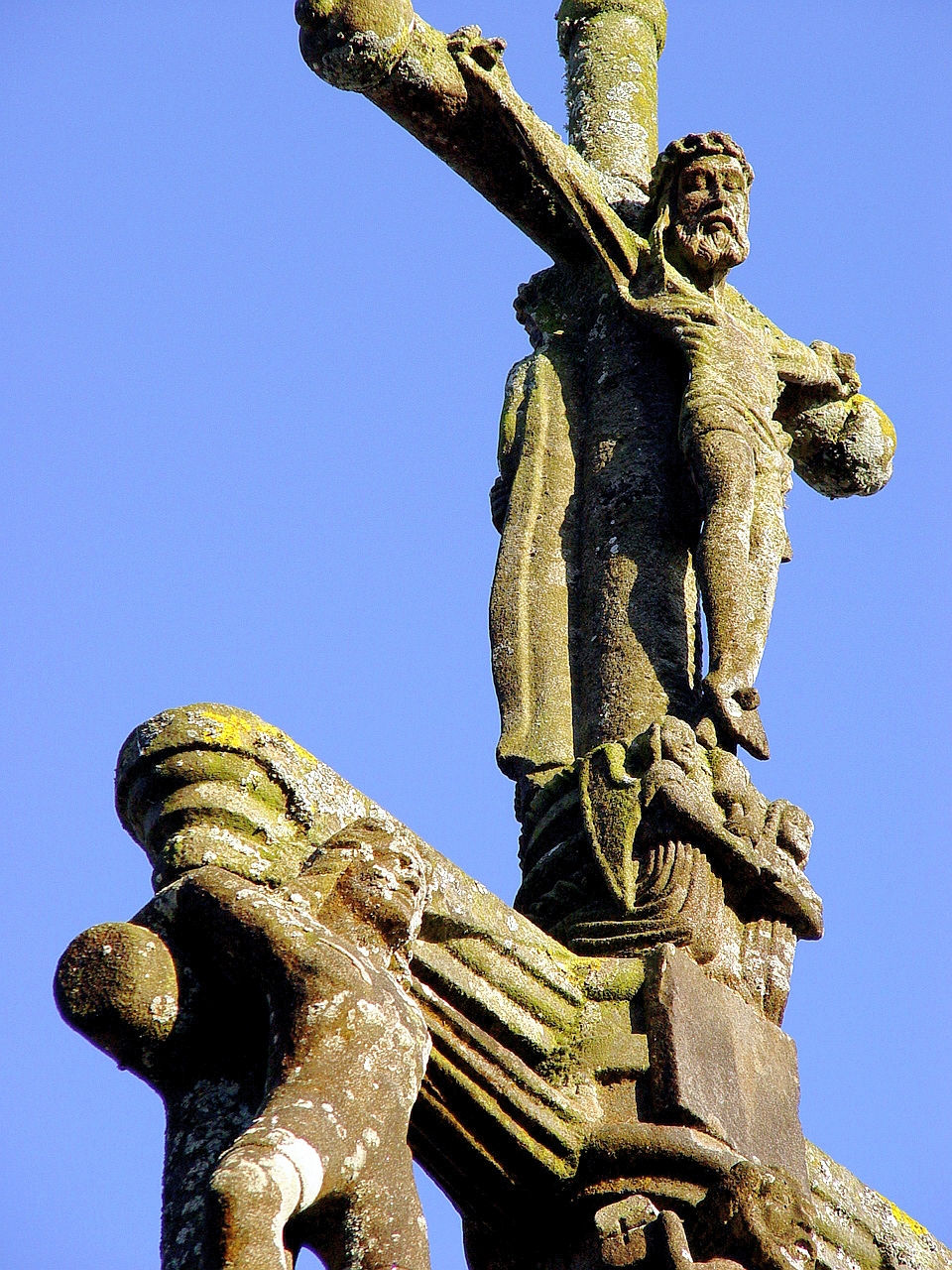
Another view of the cross. We can see two small angels at Jesus' feet. They collect his blood in chalices.

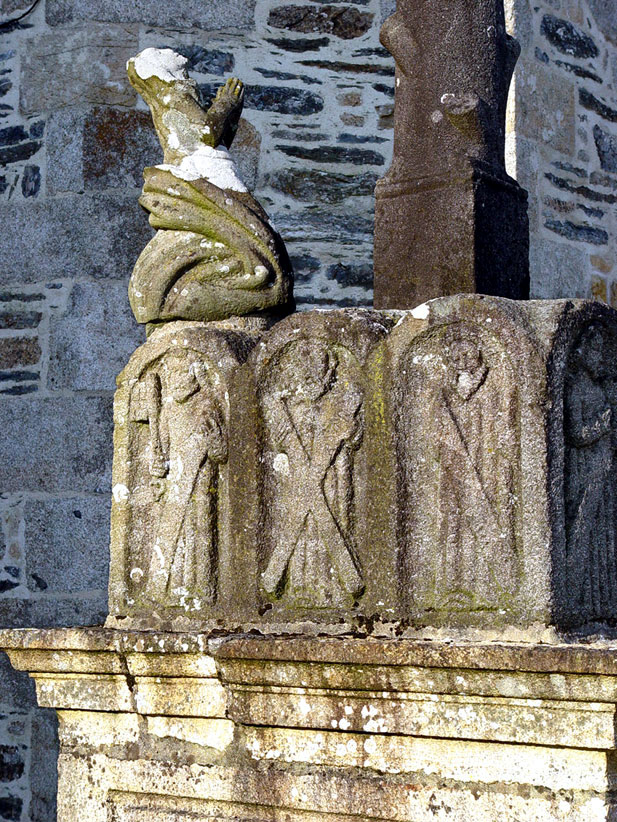
Mary Magdalene kneels in prayer at the base of the cross

== The sablières ==
The sablières in the church include scenes from daily life as well as depictions of mythological creatures. In one scene geese are shown attacking a man's face.

== The main altar ==
Depictions include Saint Peter and Andrew the Apostle, these shown on either side of a Christ in Majesty. On either side of the central painting are large statues of the Virgin Mary and Saint Peter.

== The baptistry ==
The baptistry is an elaborate Baroque work with four Corinthian columns. Over the font is a star-like structure (une Gloire) containing a triangle in which the name of God in Hebrew is inscribed, whilst to the rear there is a painting of John the Baptist baptizing Jesus. This is inscribed in Latin with words that translate as: "No one can enter the Kingdom of God without being born of water and the Spirit" (John 3:5).

== The chevet ==
Many Bretons died fighting in Belgium in the 1914–1918 war, and to mark this the commune decided to send one of their calvaries, the Croaz Ty Ru cross, to Maissin in Belgium where it stands in the war cemetery. The 19th French Infantry had fought in this area on the Western Front. See photographs below.

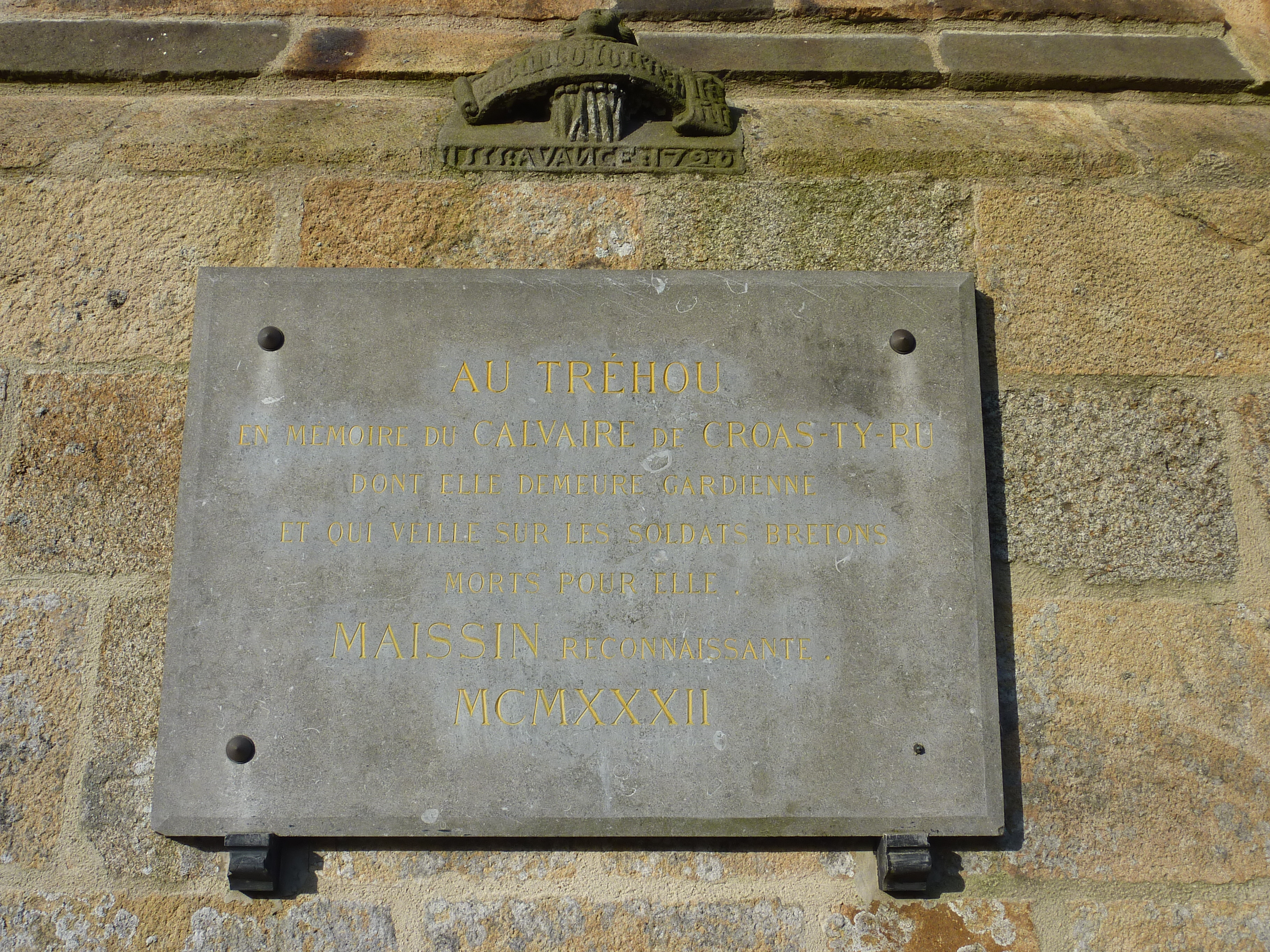
The plaque on the chevet

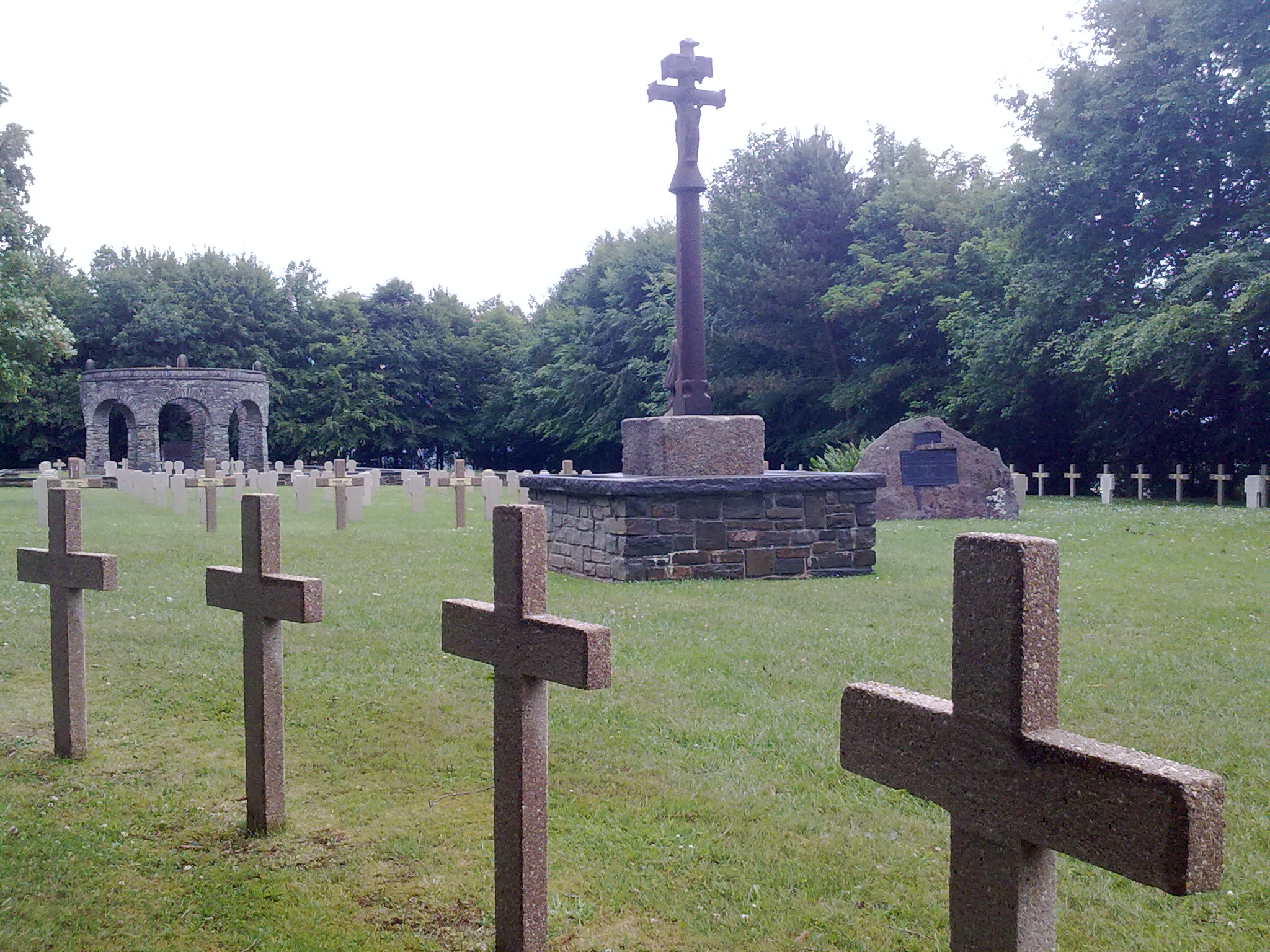
The Croaz Ty Ru cross in the Belgian cemetery

== Other images ==
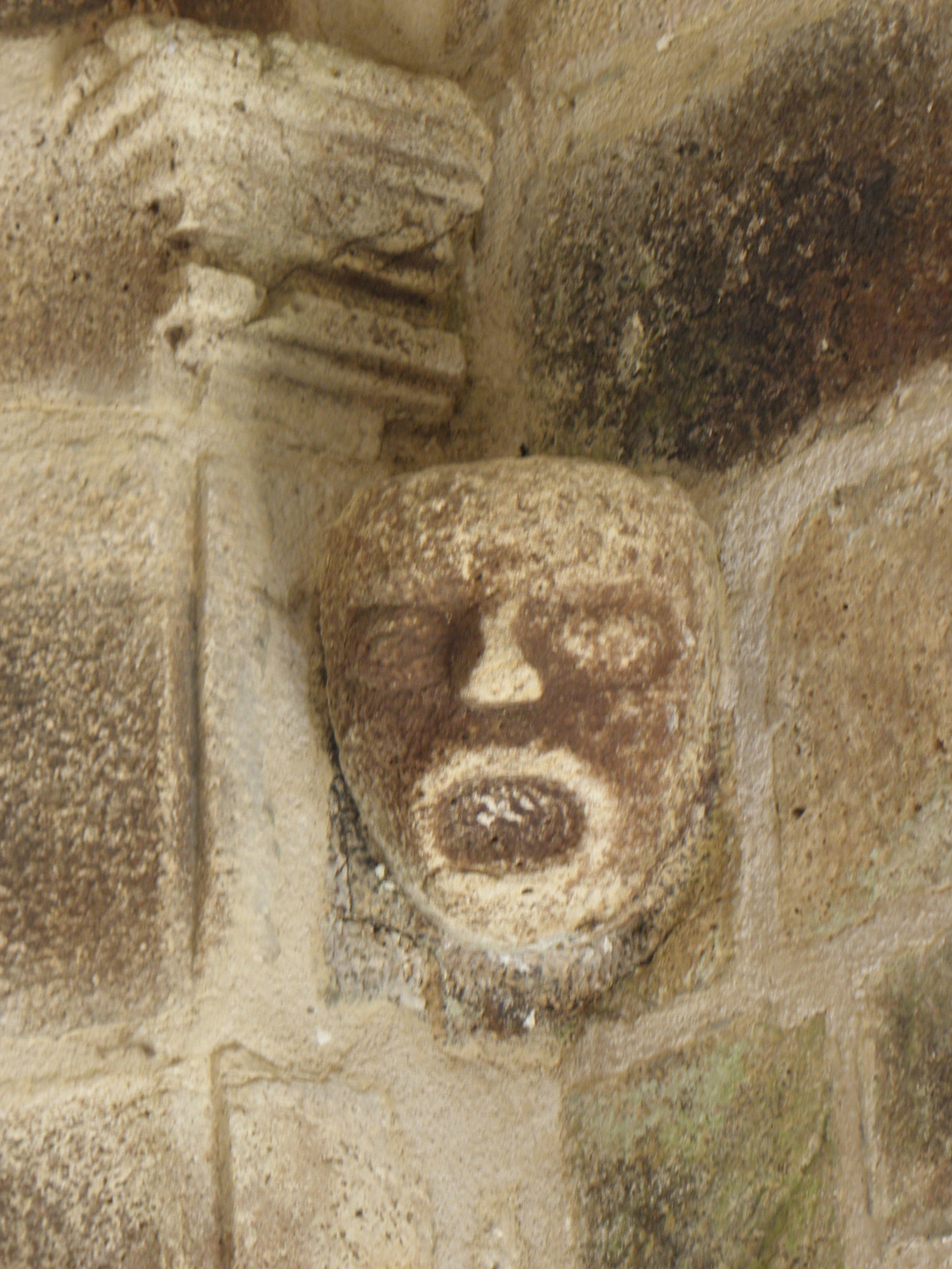
Carving on the south porch wall

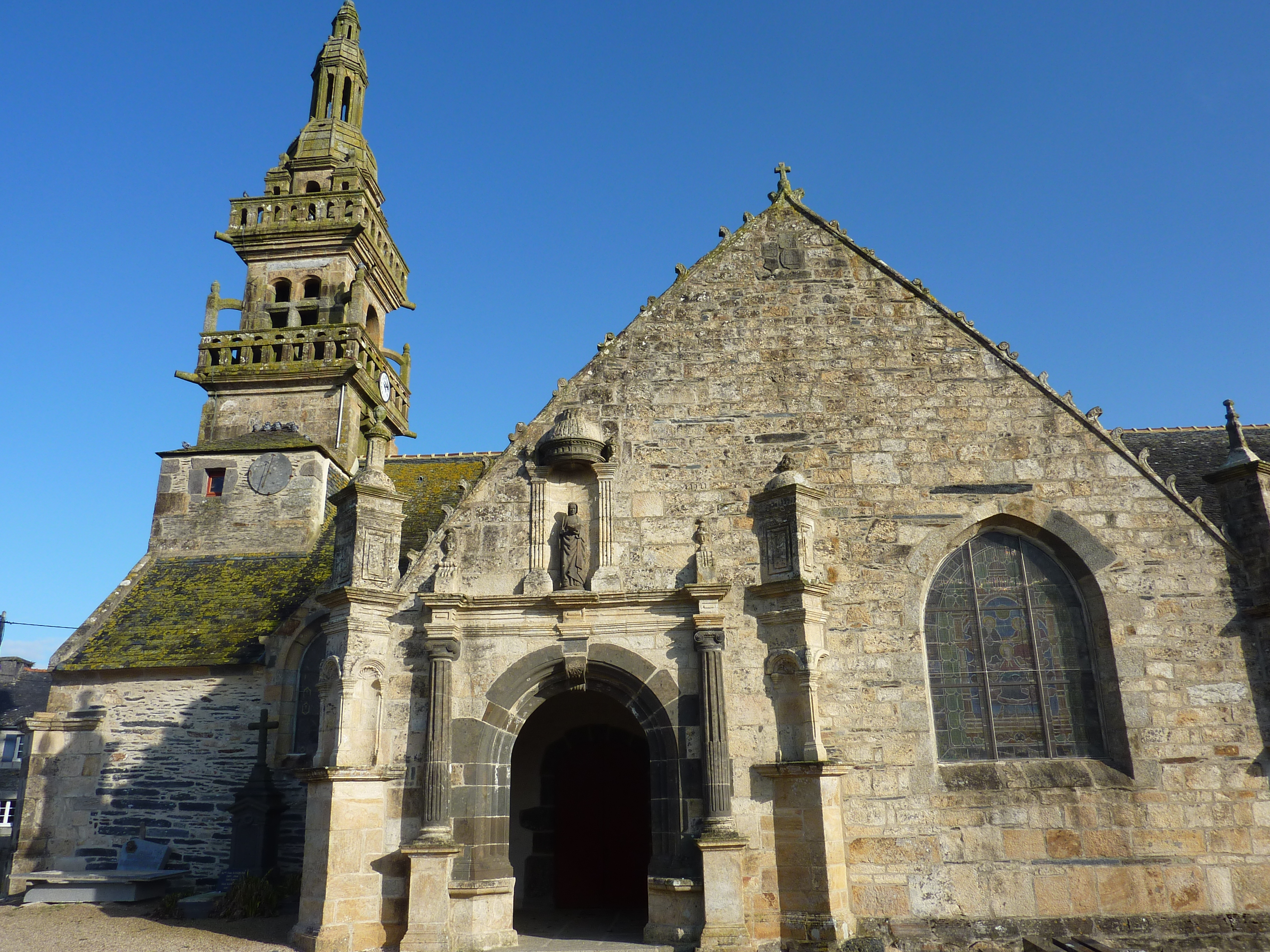
View of church showing south porch
