= Tréflévénez =

Tréflévénez Trelevenez
- Commune
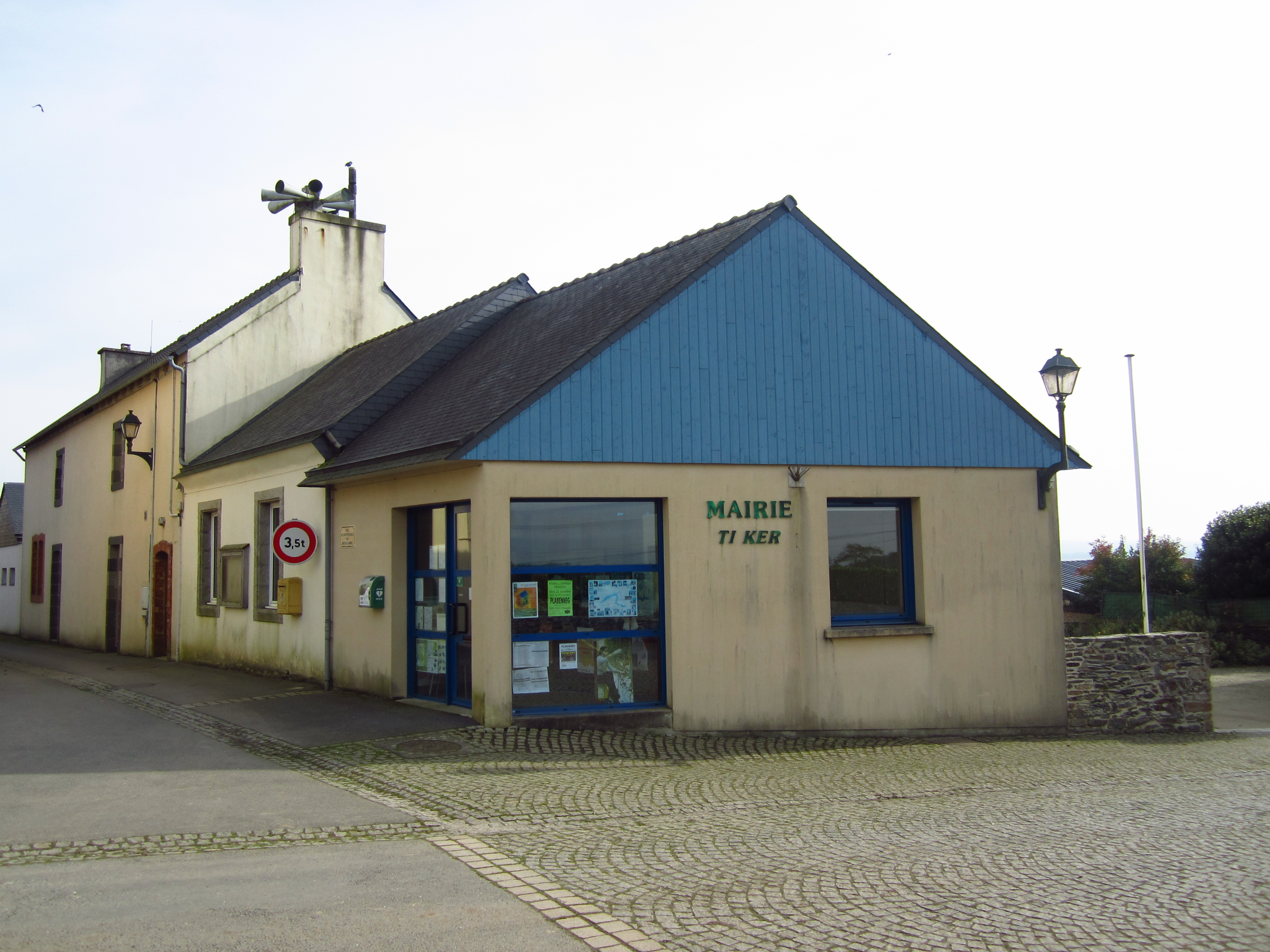
- The town hall in Tréflévénez
- Location of Tréflévénez
- Location within France Location within Brittany
- Coordinates: 48°24′57″N 4°10′07″W
- Country: France
- Region: Brittany
- Department: Finistère
- Arrondissement: Brest
- Canton: Pont-de-Buis-lès-Quimerch
- Intercommunality: CA Pays de Landerneau-Daoulas

Government
  - Mayor (2020–2026): Georges Philippe
- Area^{1}: 9.65 km^{2} (3.73 sq mi)
- Highest elevation: 163 m (535 ft)
- Lowest elevation: 35 m (115 ft)
- Population (2023): 260
  - Density: 27/km^{2} (70/sq mi)
- Time zone: UTC+01:00 (CET)
  - Summer (DST): UTC+02:00 (CEST)
- INSEE/Postal code: 29286 /29800
- ^{1} French Land Register data, which excludes lakes, ponds, glaciers > 1 km^{2} (0.386 sq mi or 247 acres) and river estuaries.

Tréflévénez (French pronunciation: [tʁeflevenɛz]; Breton: Trelevenez) is a commune in the Finistère department of Brittany in north-western France.

== Population ==
Inhabitants of Tréflévénez are called in French Tréflévénéziens.

== See also ==
- Communes of the Finistère department
