= Hanvec =

Hanvec Hañveg
- Commune
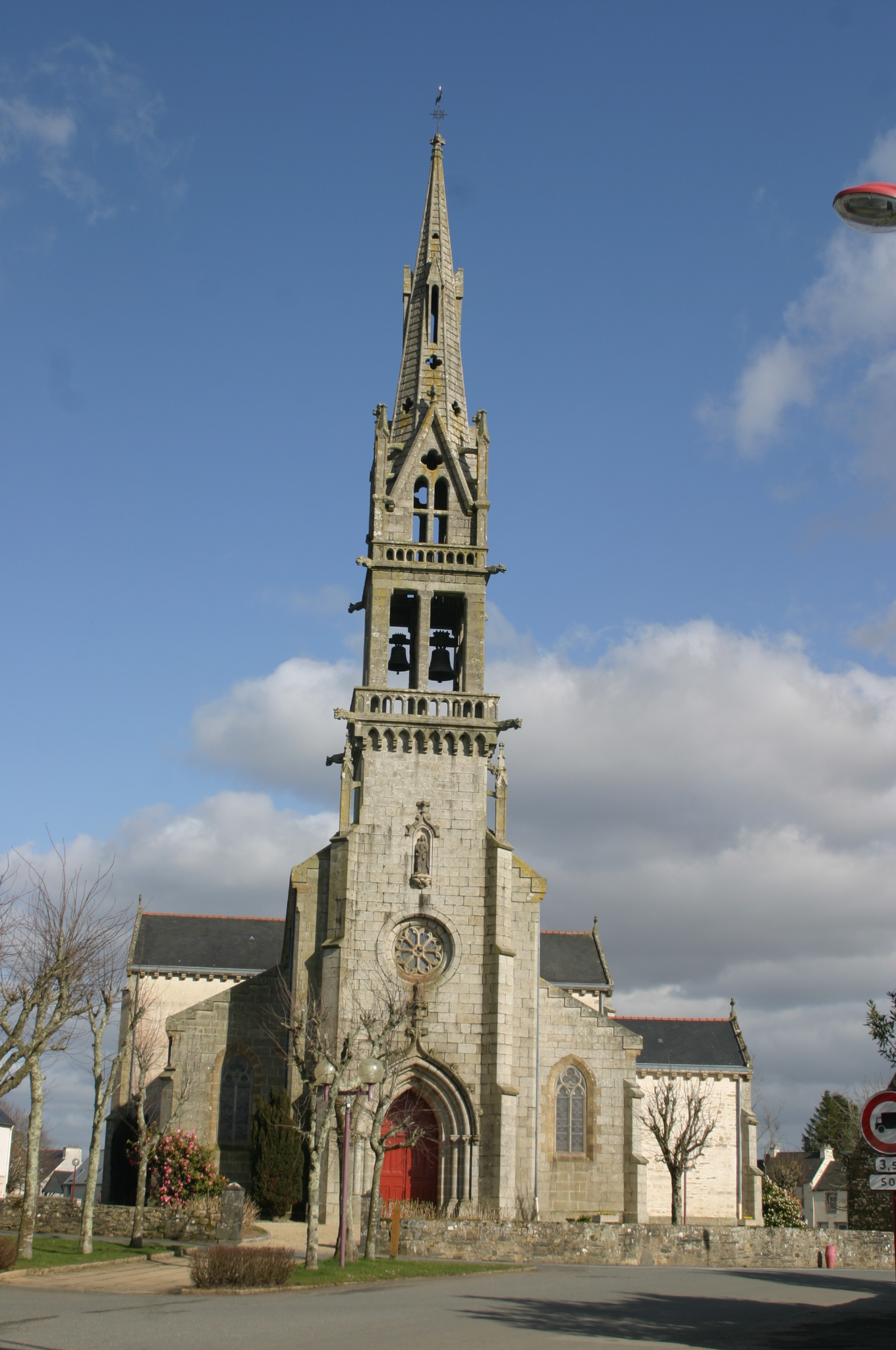
- The Church of Saint-Pierre, in Hanvec
- Location of Hanvec
- Location within France Location within Brittany
- Coordinates: 48°19′39″N 4°09′31″W
- Country: France
- Region: Brittany
- Department: Finistère
- Arrondissement: Brest
- Canton: Pont-de-Buis-lès-Quimerch
- Intercommunality: CA Pays de Landerneau-Daoulas

Government
  - Mayor (2020–2026): Yves Cyrille
- Area^{1}: 59.11 km^{2} (22.82 sq mi)
- Highest elevation: 320 m (1,050 ft)
- Lowest elevation: 0 m (0 ft)
- Population (2023): 2,025
  - Density: 34.26/km^{2} (88.73/sq mi)
- Time zone: UTC+01:00 (CET)
  - Summer (DST): UTC+02:00 (CEST)
- INSEE/Postal code: 29078 /29460
- ^{1} French Land Register data, which excludes lakes, ponds, glaciers > 1 km^{2} (0.386 sq mi or 247 acres) and river estuaries.

Hanvec (French pronunciation: [ɑ̃vɛk]; Breton: Hañveg) is a commune in the Finistère department of Brittany in northwestern France.

== Population ==
Inhabitants of Hanvec are called in French Hanvécois.

Historical population

Year	Pop.	±% p.a.
1793	2,235	—
1800	2,341	+0.66%
1806	2,216	−0.91%
1821	2,604	+1.08%
1831	2,888	+1.04%
1836	2,723	−1.17%
1841	2,763	+0.29%
1846	3,067	+2.11%
1851	3,251	+1.17%
1856	3,158	−0.58%
1861	3,118	−0.25%
1866	3,350	+1.45%
1872	3,088	−1.35%
1876	3,164	+0.61%
1881	3,082	−0.52%
1886	3,116	+0.22%
1891	3,090	−0.17%
1896	3,020	−0.46%
1901	2,888	−0.89%

Year	Pop.	±% p.a.
1906	2,866	−0.15%
1911	2,865	−0.01%
1921	2,585	−1.02%
1926	2,649	+0.49%
1931	2,581	−0.52%
1936	2,557	−0.19%
1946	2,186	−1.56%
1954	1,912	−1.66%
1962	1,716	−1.34%
1968	1,555	−1.63%
1975	1,318	−2.33%
1982	1,374	+0.60%
1990	1,474	+0.88%
1999	1,605	+0.95%
2007	1,916	+2.24%
2012	1,969	+0.55%
2017	2,025	+0.56%
2023	2,025	+0.00%

Source: EHESS and INSEE (1968-2023)

== See also ==
- Communes of the Finistère department
- Parc naturel régional d'Armorique
