= Hôpital-Camfrout =

Hôpital-Camfrout An Ospital
- Commune
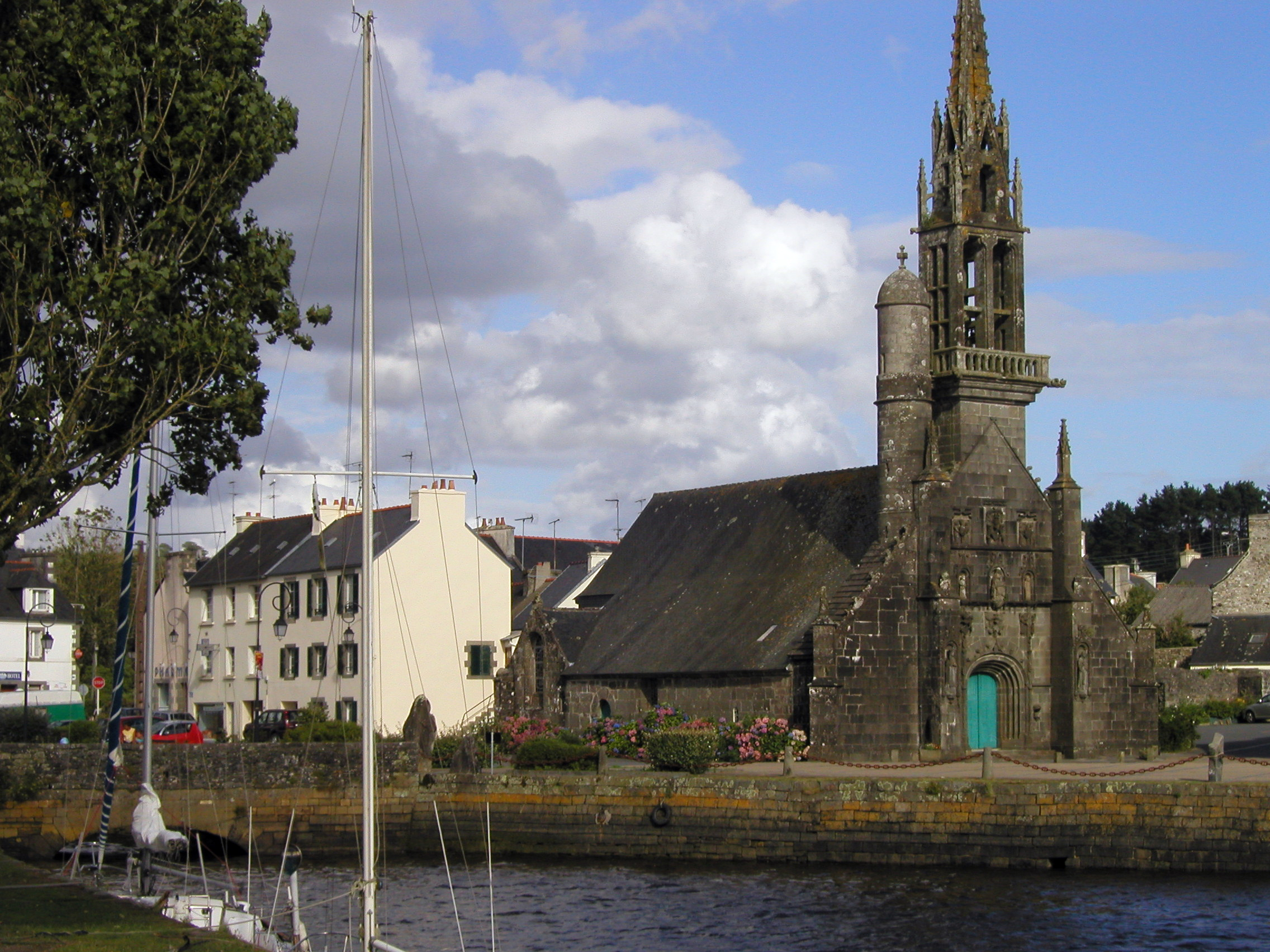
- The church of Our Lady of Good News, and the Camfrout

- Coat of arms
- Location of Hôpital-Camfrout
- Location within France Location within Brittany
- Coordinates: 48°19′43″N 4°14′26″W
- Country: France
- Region: Brittany
- Department: Finistère
- Arrondissement: Brest
- Canton: Pont-de-Buis-lès-Quimerch
- Intercommunality: CA Pays de Landerneau-Daoulas

Government
  - Mayor (2020–2026): Jean-Jacques Leon
- Area^{1}: 13.16 km^{2} (5.08 sq mi)
- Highest elevation: 93 m (305 ft)
- Lowest elevation: 0 m (0 ft)
- Population (2023): 2,215
  - Density: 168.3/km^{2} (435.9/sq mi)
- Time zone: UTC+01:00 (CET)
  - Summer (DST): UTC+02:00 (CEST)
- INSEE/Postal code: 29080 /29460
- ^{1} French Land Register data, which excludes lakes, ponds, glaciers > 1 km^{2} (0.386 sq mi or 247 acres) and river estuaries.

Hôpital-Camfrout (Breton: An Ospital) is a commune in the Finistère department and administrative region of Brittany in north-western France.

== Population ==
In French the inhabitants of Hôpital-Camfrout are known as Hospitaliers or Camfroutois.

Historical population
Year	Pop.	±% p.a.
1968	1,209	—
1975	1,063	−1.82%
1982	1,407	+4.09%
1990	1,505	+0.85%
1999	1,641	+0.97%
2007	1,902	+1.86%
2012	2,228	+3.21%
2017	2,247	+0.17%
2023	2,215	−0.24%
Source: INSEE

== International relations ==
Hôpital-Camfrout is twinned with:

- Feock, United Kingdom

== See also ==
- Communes of the Finistère department
- Parc naturel régional d'Armorique
