= Le Tréhou =

Le Tréhou An Treoù-Leon
- Commune
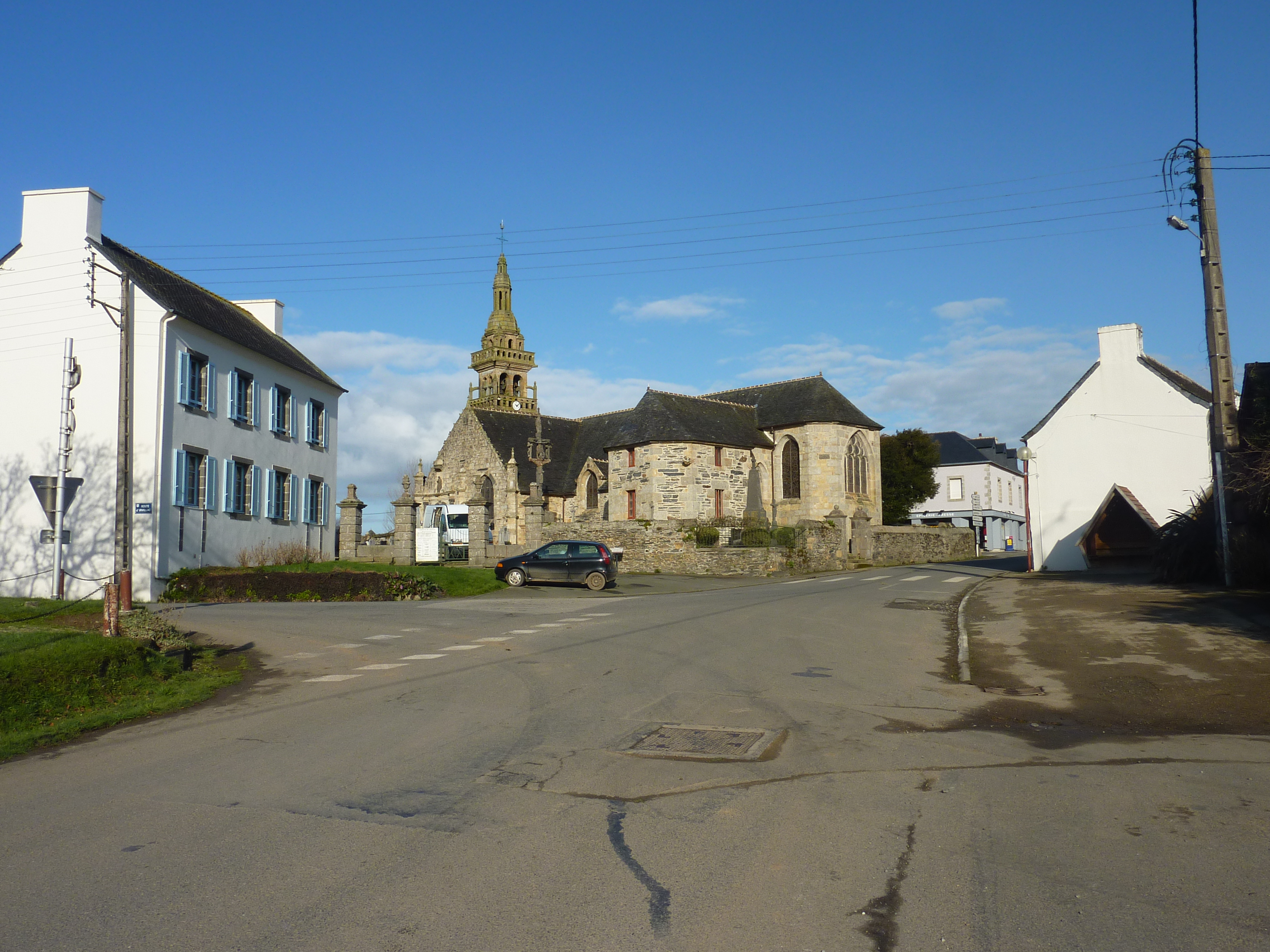
- The main road and the parish church of Sainte-Pitère

- Coat of arms
- Location of Le Tréhou
- Location within France Location within Brittany
- Coordinates: 48°23′41″N 4°07′47″W
- Country: France
- Region: Brittany
- Department: Finistère
- Arrondissement: Brest
- Canton: Pont-de-Buis-lès-Quimerch
- Intercommunality: CA Pays de Landerneau-Daoulas

Government
  - Mayor (2020–2026): Joël Cann
- Area^{1}: 22.79 km^{2} (8.80 sq mi)
- Highest elevation: 171 m (561 ft)
- Lowest elevation: 35 m (115 ft)
- Population (2023): 633
  - Density: 27.8/km^{2} (71.9/sq mi)
- Time zone: UTC+01:00 (CET)
  - Summer (DST): UTC+02:00 (CEST)
- INSEE/Postal code: 29294 /29450
- ^{1} French Land Register data, which excludes lakes, ponds, glaciers > 1 km^{2} (0.386 sq mi or 247 acres) and river estuaries.

Le Tréhou (French pronunciation: [lə tʁeu]; Breton: An Treoù-Leon) is a commune in the Finistère department of Brittany in north-western France.

== Population ==
Inhabitants of Le Tréhou are called in French Tréhousiens.

Historical population

Year	Pop.	±% p.a.
1793	1,077	—
1800	1,054	−0.31%
1806	1,068	+0.22%
1821	1,045	−0.15%
1831	1,072	+0.26%
1836	1,106	+0.63%
1841	1,120	+0.25%
1846	1,184	+1.12%
1851	1,169	−0.25%
1856	1,169	+0.00%
1861	1,172	+0.05%
1866	1,213	+0.69%
1872	1,163	−0.70%
1876	1,272	+2.26%
1881	1,198	−1.19%
1886	1,228	+0.50%
1891	1,167	−1.01%
1896	1,134	−0.57%
1901	1,046	−1.60%

Year	Pop.	±% p.a.
1906	1,027	−0.37%
1911	1,084	+1.09%
1921	1,061	−0.21%
1926	1,003	−1.12%
1931	926	−1.58%
1936	856	−1.56%
1946	774	−1.00%
1954	671	−1.77%
1962	619	−1.00%
1968	596	−0.63%
1975	527	−1.74%
1982	453	−2.14%
1990	395	−1.70%
1999	408	+0.36%
2007	522	+3.13%
2012	609	+3.13%
2017	633	+0.78%
2023	633	+0.00%

Source: EHESS and INSEE (1968-2023)

== See also ==
- List of the works of Bastien and Henry Prigent
- Communes of the Finistère department
- Le Tréhou Parish close
