= Canton of Pont-de-Buis-lès-Quimerch =

Coordinates: 48.26°N 4.09°W

The canton of Pont-de-Buis-lès-Quimerch is an administrative division of the Finistère department, northwestern France. It was created at the French canton reorganisation which came into effect in March 2015. Its seat is in Pont-de-Buis-lès-Quimerch.

It consists of the following communes:

1. Daoulas
2. Dirinon
3. Le Faou
4. Hanvec
5. Hôpital-Camfrout
6. Irvillac
7. Logonna-Daoulas
8. Loperhet
9. La Martyre
10. Ploudiry
11. Pont-de-Buis-lès-Quimerch
12. Rosnoën
13. Saint-Eloy
14. Saint-Ségal
15. Saint-Urbain
16. Tréflévénez
17. Le Tréhou
