= Arboretum du Cranou =

Arboretum in Saint-Eloy, Finistère, Brittany, France

Coordinates: 48.317°N 4.083°W

The Arboretum du Cranou (14 hectares) is an arboretum located within the Forêt du Cranou (600 hectares) in Saint-Eloy, Finistère, Brittany, France. It is open daily without charge.

The arboretum was created in 1970 by the Office national des forêts (ONF) and the Institut national de recherché agronomique (INRA) for reforestation studies. As such, it contained experimental plantings of a limited number of species, each represented by many subjects, including 51 species of hardwoods and conifers such as Sitka spruce, larch, and cryptomeria. The arboretum was refreshed in 2006 to add 45 species (100 specimens), with an additional 90 species (250 specimens) planted in 2007, and a plan of reaching 150 species.

== See also ==
- List of botanical gardens in France
