= Logonna-Daoulas =

Logonna-Daoulas Logonna-Daoulaz
- Commune
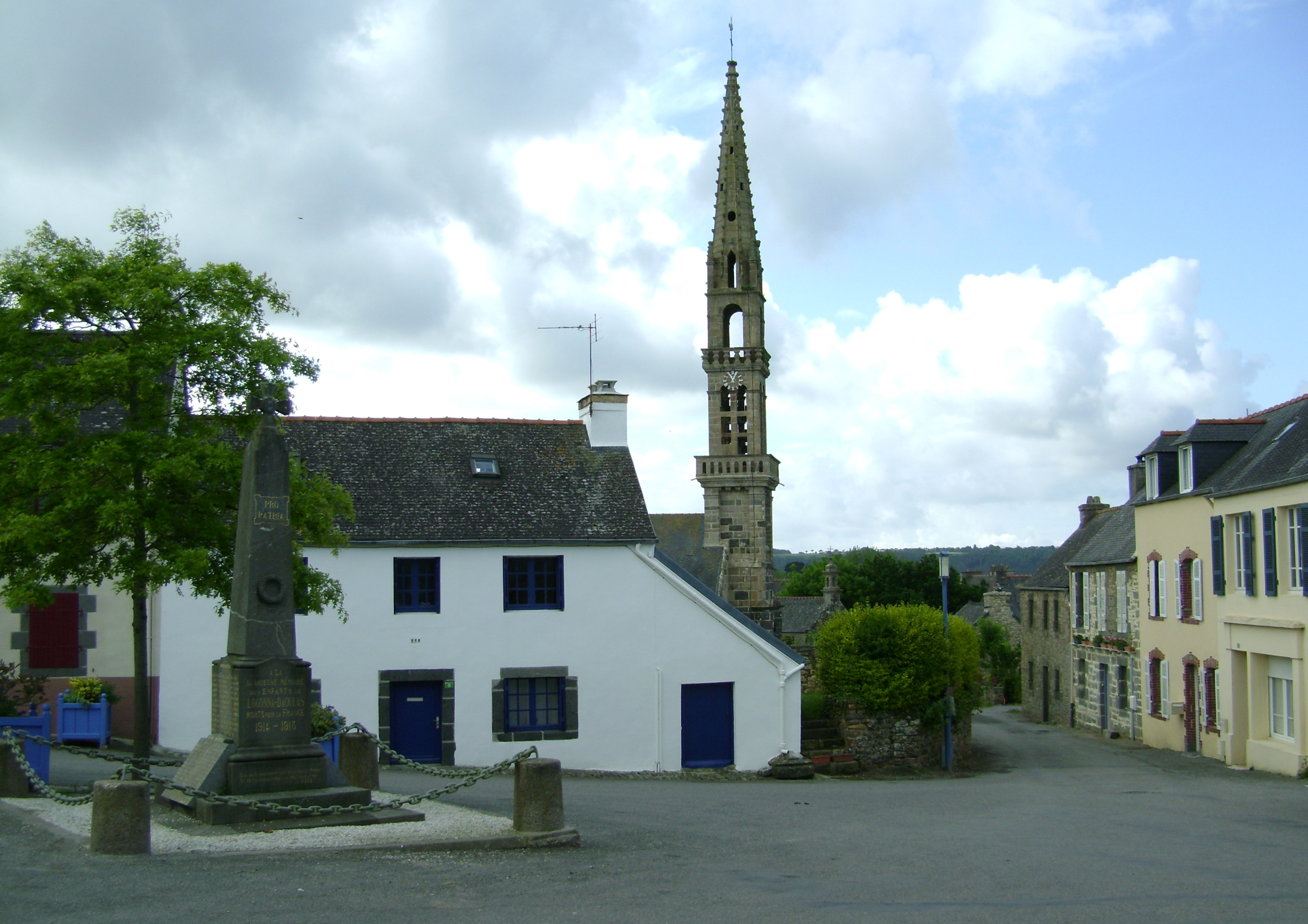
- Saint-Monna Square, in Logonna-Daoulas
- Location of Logonna-Daoulas
- Location within France Location within Brittany
- Coordinates: 48°19′18″N 4°17′50″W
- Country: France
- Region: Brittany
- Department: Finistère
- Arrondissement: Brest
- Canton: Pont-de-Buis-lès-Quimerch
- Intercommunality: CA Pays de Landerneau-Daoulas

Government
  - Mayor (2020–2026): Fabrice Ferré
- Area^{1}: 12.14 km^{2} (4.69 sq mi)
- Highest elevation: 77 m (253 ft)
- Lowest elevation: 0 m (0 ft)
- Population (2023): 2,130
  - Density: 175/km^{2} (454/sq mi)
- Time zone: UTC+01:00 (CET)
  - Summer (DST): UTC+02:00 (CEST)
- INSEE/Postal code: 29137 /29460
- ^{1} French Land Register data, which excludes lakes, ponds, glaciers > 1 km^{2} (0.386 sq mi or 247 acres) and river estuaries.

Logonna-Daoulas (French pronunciation: [lɔɡɔna daulas]; Breton: Logonna-Daoulaz) is a commune in the Finistère department of Brittany in north-western France.

== Population ==
Inhabitants of Logonna-Daoulas are called in French Logonnais.

Historical population
Year	Pop.	±% p.a.
1968	1,223	—
1975	1,115	−1.31%
1982	1,312	+2.35%
1990	1,429	+1.07%
1999	1,579	+1.12%
2007	2,025	+3.16%
2012	2,102	+0.75%
2017	2,124	+0.21%
2023	2,130	+0.05%
Source: INSEE

== See also ==
- Communes of the Finistère department
- Parc naturel régional d'Armorique
- Roland Doré sculptor. Sculptor with work in Logonna Doulas
