= Communauté d'agglomération du Pays de Landerneau-Daoulas =

Pays de Landerneau-Daoulas
- Communauté d'agglomération
- Interactive map of Pays de Landerneau-Daoulas
- Coordinates: 48°25′N 04°12′W
- Country: France
- Region: Brittany
- Department: Finistère
- No. of communes: {{{nbcomm}}}
- Established: 2009
- Area: 371.4 km^{2} (143.4 sq mi)
- Population (2019): 49,030
  - Density: 132.0/km^{2} (341.9/sq mi)
- Website: www.pays-landerneau-daoulas.fr

Communauté d'agglomération du Pays de Landerneau-Daoulas (Breton: Kumuniezh kêrel Bro Landerne-Daoulaz) is the communauté d'agglomération, an intercommunal structure, centred on the town of Landerneau. It is located in the Finistère department, in the Brittany region, northwestern France. Created in 2009, its seat is in Landerneau. Its area is 371.4 km^{2}. Its population was 49,030 in 2019, of which 15,918 in Landerneau proper.

== Composition ==
The communauté d'agglomération consists of the following 22 communes:

1. Daoulas
2. Dirinon
3. La Forest-Landerneau
4. Hanvec
5. Hôpital-Camfrout
6. Irvillac
7. Landerneau
8. Lanneuffret
9. Logonna-Daoulas
10. Loperhet
11. La Martyre
12. Pencran
13. Ploudiry
14. Plouédern
15. La Roche-Maurice
16. Saint-Divy
17. Saint-Eloy
18. Saint-Thonan
19. Saint-Urbain
20. Tréflévénez
21. Le Tréhou
22. Trémaouézan
