= Dirinon =

Dirinon Dirinonn
- Commune
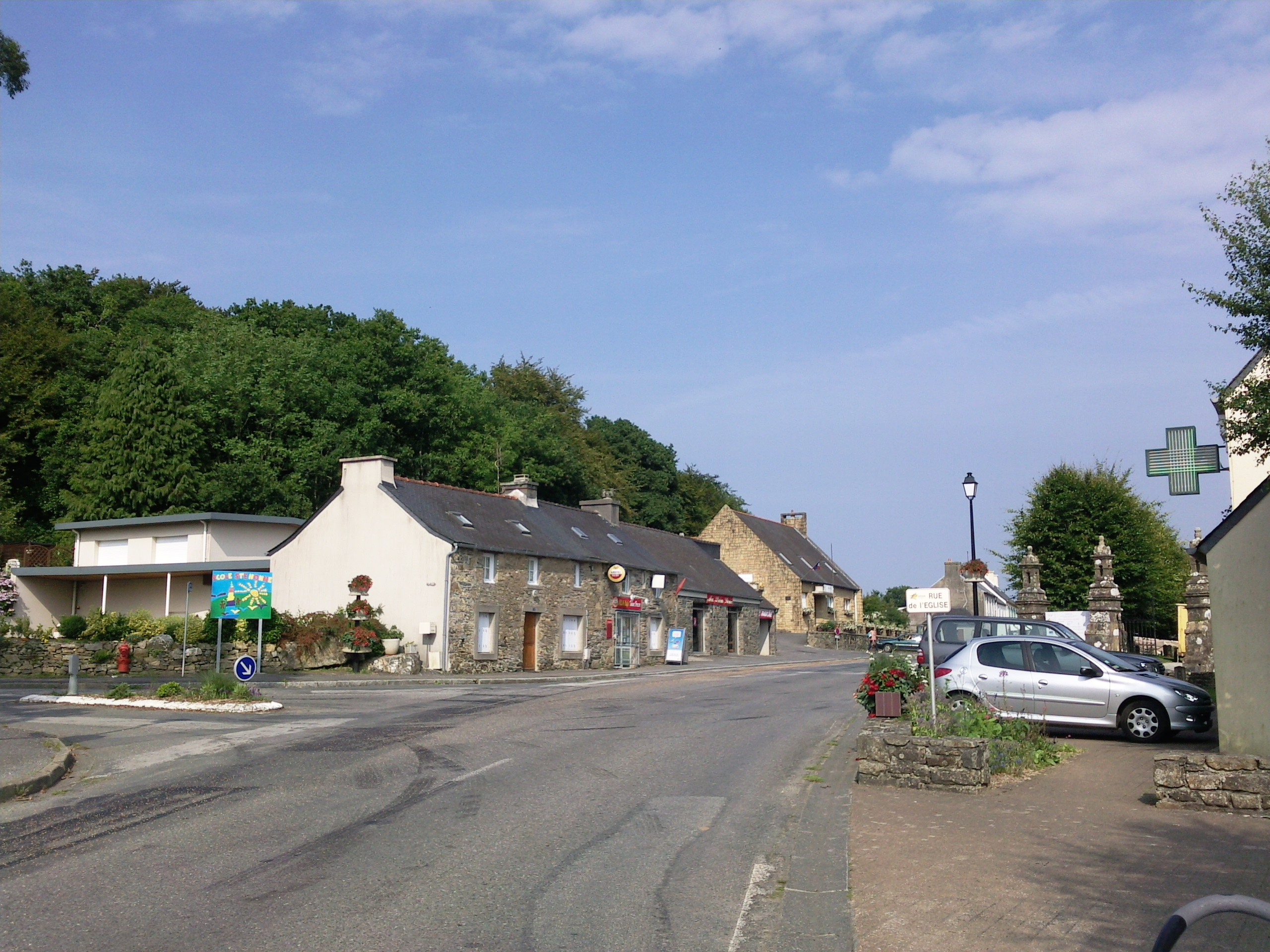
- The road into Dirinon, from the south-west

- Coat of arms
- Location of Dirinon
- Location within France Location within Brittany
- Coordinates: 48°23′52″N 4°16′07″W
- Country: France
- Region: Brittany
- Department: Finistère
- Arrondissement: Brest
- Canton: Pont-de-Buis-lès-Quimerch
- Intercommunality: CA Pays de Landerneau-Daoulas

Government
  - Mayor (2020–2026): Guillaume Bodenez
- Area^{1}: 33.02 km^{2} (12.75 sq mi)
- Highest elevation: 179 m (587 ft)
- Lowest elevation: 1 m (3.3 ft)
- Population (2023): 2,188
  - Density: 66.26/km^{2} (171.6/sq mi)
- Time zone: UTC+01:00 (CET)
  - Summer (DST): UTC+02:00 (CEST)
- INSEE/Postal code: 29045 /29460
- ^{1} French Land Register data, which excludes lakes, ponds, glaciers > 1 km^{2} (0.386 sq mi or 247 acres) and river estuaries.

Dirinon (French pronunciation: [diʁinɔ̃]; Breton: Dirinonn) is a commune in the Finistère department of Brittany in northwestern France.

== Population ==
Inhabitants of Dirinon are called in French Dirinonais.

Historical population

| Year | Pop. | ±% p.a. |
|---|---|---|
| 1793 | 1,534 | — |
| 1800 | 970 | −6.34% |
| 1806 | 1,698 | +9.78% |
| 1821 | 1,629 | −0.28% |
| 1831 | 1,670 | +0.25% |
| 1836 | 1,733 | +0.74% |
| 1841 | 1,745 | +0.14% |
| 1846 | 1,716 | −0.33% |
| 1851 | 1,766 | +0.58% |
| 1856 | 1,650 | −1.35% |
| 1861 | 1,638 | −0.15% |
| 1866 | 1,711 | +0.88% |
| 1872 | 1,658 | −0.52% |
| 1876 | 1,656 | −0.03% |
| 1881 | 1,614 | −0.51% |
| 1886 | 1,605 | −0.11% |
| 1891 | 1,518 | −1.11% |
| 1896 | 1,504 | −0.19% |
| 1901 | 1,503 | −0.01% |

| Year | Pop. | ±% p.a. |
|---|---|---|
| 1906 | 1,504 | +0.01% |
| 1911 | 1,432 | −0.98% |
| 1921 | 1,350 | −0.59% |
| 1926 | 1,311 | −0.58% |
| 1931 | 1,358 | +0.71% |
| 1936 | 1,280 | −1.18% |
| 1946 | 1,236 | −0.35% |
| 1954 | 1,120 | −1.22% |
| 1962 | 1,080 | −0.45% |
| 1968 | 1,010 | −1.11% |
| 1975 | 1,218 | +2.71% |
| 1982 | 1,799 | +5.73% |
| 1990 | 2,024 | +1.48% |
| 1999 | 2,342 | +1.63% |
| 2007 | 2,455 | +0.59% |
| 2012 | 2,385 | −0.58% |
| 2017 | 2,261 | −1.06% |
| 2023 | 2,188 | −0.55% |

Source: EHESS and INSEE (1968-2023)

== See also ==
- Communes of the Finistère department
- Dirinon Parish close
- List of the works of the Maître de Guimiliau
