= Irvillac =

Irvillac Irvilhag
- Commune
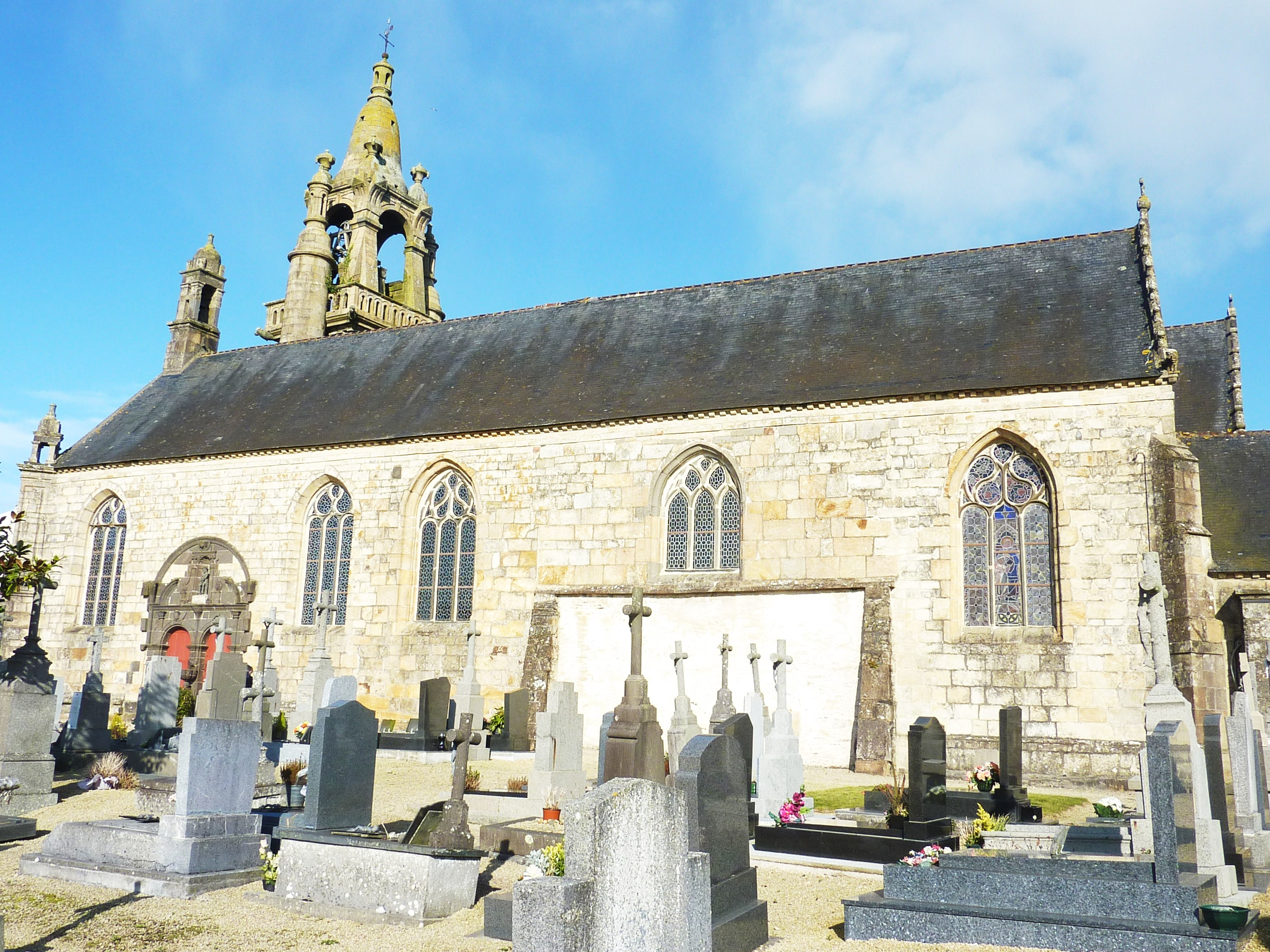
- Saint Peter's church in Irvillac

- Coat of arms
- Location of Irvillac
- Location within France Location within Brittany
- Coordinates: 48°22′16″N 4°12′40″W
- Country: France
- Region: Brittany
- Department: Finistère
- Arrondissement: Brest
- Canton: Pont-de-Buis-lès-Quimerch
- Intercommunality: CA Pays de Landerneau-Daoulas

Government
  - Mayor (2020–2026): Jean-Noël Le Gall
- Area^{1}: 29.60 km^{2} (11.43 sq mi)
- Highest elevation: 134 m (440 ft)
- Lowest elevation: 3 m (9.8 ft)
- Population (2023): 1,411
  - Density: 47.67/km^{2} (123.5/sq mi)
- Time zone: UTC+01:00 (CET)
  - Summer (DST): UTC+02:00 (CEST)
- INSEE/Postal code: 29086 /29460
- ^{1} French Land Register data, which excludes lakes, ponds, glaciers > 1 km^{2} (0.386 sq mi or 247 acres) and river estuaries.

Irvillac (French pronunciation: [iʁvijak]; Breton: Irvilhag) is a commune in the Finistère department and administrative region of Brittany in north-western France.

== Population ==
Historical population
Year	Pop.	±% p.a.
1968	983	—
1975	822	−2.52%
1982	935	+1.86%
1990	1,005	+0.91%
1999	1,011	+0.07%
2007	1,276	+2.95%
2012	1,380	+1.58%
2017	1,429	+0.70%
2023	1,411	−0.21%
Source: INSEE

In French the inhabitants of Irvillac are known as Irvillacois.

== See also ==
- Communes of the Finistère department
- Jean Joncourt, sculptor, born in Irvillac
- Roland Doré sculptor, sculptor of the calvary in Irvillac
