= Daoulas =

Daoulas Daoulaz
- Commune
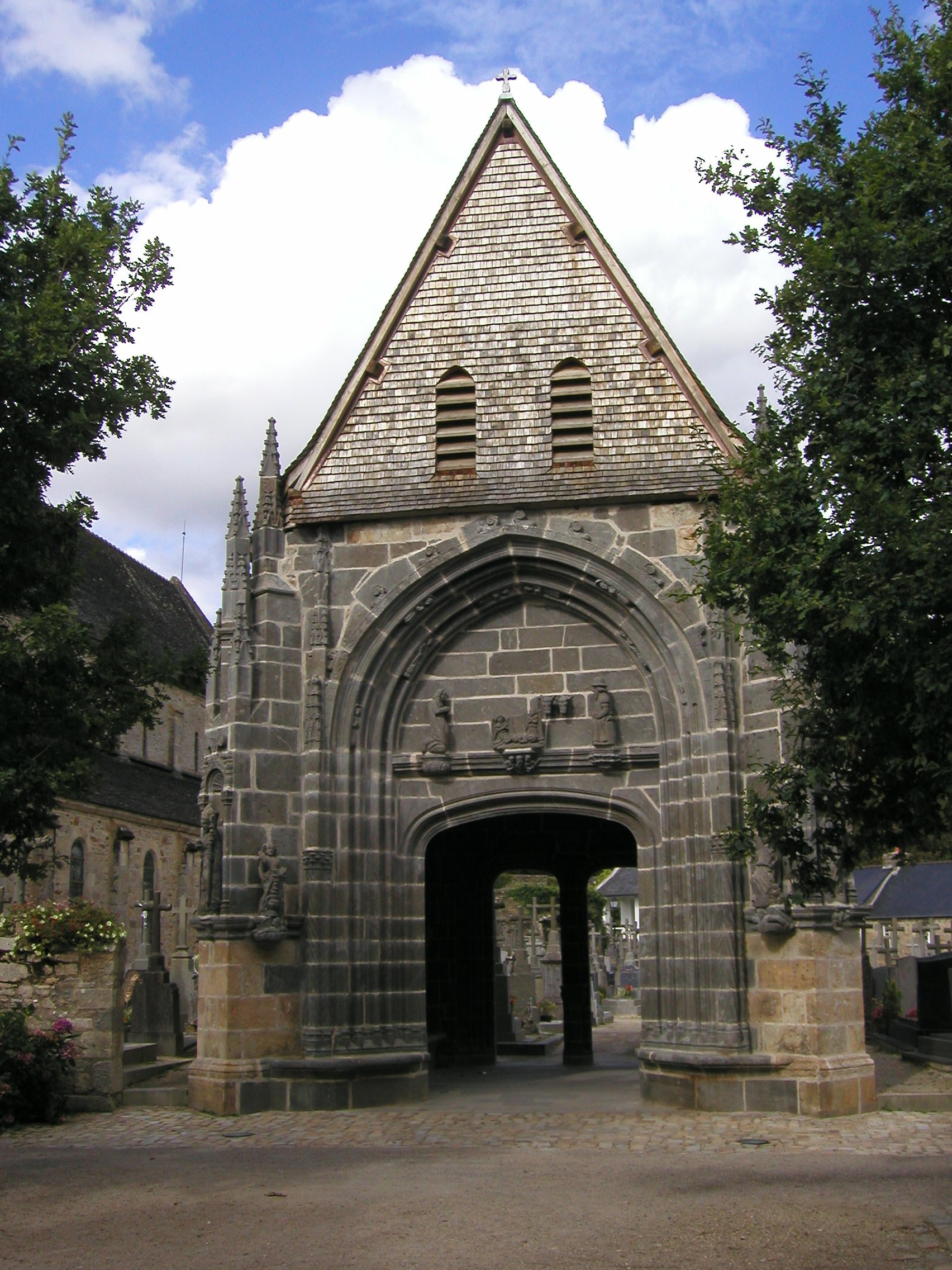
- Cemetery portal
- Location of Daoulas
- Location within France Location within Brittany
- Coordinates: 48°21′42″N 4°15′29″W
- Country: France
- Region: Brittany
- Department: Finistère
- Arrondissement: Brest
- Canton: Pont-de-Buis-lès-Quimerch
- Intercommunality: CA Pays de Landerneau-Daoulas

Government
  - Mayor (2020–2026): Jean-Luc Le Saux
- Area^{1}: 5.42 km^{2} (2.09 sq mi)
- Highest elevation: 97 m (318 ft)
- Lowest elevation: 0 m (0 ft)
- Population (2023): 1,864
  - Density: 344/km^{2} (891/sq mi)
- Time zone: UTC+01:00 (CET)
  - Summer (DST): UTC+02:00 (CEST)
- INSEE/Postal code: 29043 /29460
- ^{1} French Land Register data, which excludes lakes, ponds, glaciers > 1 km^{2} (0.386 sq mi or 247 acres) and river estuaries.

Daoulas (French pronunciation: [daulas]; Breton: Daoulaz) is a commune in the Finistère department of Brittany in north-western France.

== Population ==
Historical population
Year	Pop.	±% p.a.
1968	1,022	—
1975	1,046	+0.33%
1982	1,401	+4.26%
1990	1,640	+1.99%
1999	1,794	+1.00%
2007	1,740	−0.38%
2012	1,767	+0.31%
2017	1,786	+0.21%
2023	1,864	+0.71%
Source: INSEE

Inhabitants of Daoulas are called in French Daoulasiens.

== Breton language ==
In 2008, 9.82% of primary-school children attended bilingual school bilingual schools, where Breton language is taught alongside French.

== See also ==
- Communes of the Finistère department
- List of works of the two Folgoët ateliers
- Parc naturel régional d'Armorique
