= Nona =

Nona may refer to:

== Places ==
- Nona, Missouri, an unincorporated community in United States
- Nin, Croatia, also known as Nona in Latin
  - Roman Catholic Diocese of Nona, which had its see there; now a Latin titular bishopric
- Tor di Nona, a small area in Rome's Rione V called "Ponte"
- Nona River, a river in Assam

== Arts and entertainment ==
- Nona (magazine), a Malaysian women's magazine
- "Nona" (short story), a 1978 story by Stephen King
- the title character of Strega Nona, a children's book by Tomie dePaola
- La Nona, a 1979 Argentine film
- Nona (2021 film), an animated short film by Pixar
- Nona (2017 film), a film by Michael Polish
- Nona, a 1985–present Malaysian television series on TV3
- Nona, the fifth track on the 1987 Mötley Crüe album, Girls, Girls, Girls
- Nona the Ninth, 2022 science fantasy novel by Tamsyn Muir
- No Na, an Indonesian girl group

== People ==
- Nona (given name), a list of people and a figure in Roman mythology
- Nona (surname), an Assyrian surname
- Gajaman Nona, pen name of Ceylonese poet and author Donna Isabella Koraneliya (1746–1815)
- Nona Balakian (1918–1991), literary critic and editor

== Other uses ==
- Nona (mythology), one of Parcae in classical mythology, equivalent to the Greek Fates
- nona-, a prefix meaning nine
- NONA FC, an American soccer club in USL League Two
- Hurricane Nona, a hurricane during the 1994 Pacific hurricane season
- 2S9 Nona, a Russian 120mm (self-propelled) gun-mortar

== See also ==
- The Nona Tapes, a 1995 mockumentary by the grunge band Alice in Chains
- None (liturgy), English for the Latin canonical hour nona
- Nonna (disambiguation)
