= Nonna =

Nonna is the Italian word for grandmother and a Russian feminine name. It may refer to:

== People ==
- Saint Non, mother of David, the patron saint of Wales
- Nonna of Nazianzus (died 370s), Catholic and Orthodox saint
- Nonna Debonne (born 1985), French footballer
- Nonna Grishayeva (born 1971), Russian actress
- Nonna Karakashyan (born 1940), Armenian chess player
- Nonna Mordyukova (1925–2008), Soviet actress
- John Nonna (born 1948), American fencer
- Ion Nonna Otescu (1888–1940), Romanian composer

== Arts, entertainment, and media ==
- Nonna, a Russian-style character from the Japanese anime series Girls und Panzer
- Nonna Felicità, a 1938 Italian film
- Nonnas, a 2025 American film

== Other uses ==
- 4022 Nonna, an asteroid
- Church of St Nonna, Bradstone, Devon, England
- St Nonna's Church, Altarnun, Cornwall, England

== See also ==
- Nana (disambiguation)
- Nona (disambiguation)
