= Nona (surname) =

- Pronunciation: Syriac: [nuːnɑː]
- Gender: unisex

Origin
- Origin: Aramaic: נונא (Nuna), Akkadian: 𒄩 (Nūnum)
- Meaning: Fish
- Region of origin: West Asia

Other names
- Variant forms: Nuna, Yona, Younes

Nona (Syriac: ܢܥܢܐ, ܢܘܢܐ) is a surname of Aramaic origin. The name derives from the Akkadian word "Nunum" or "Nuna", meaning large fish or whale (in reference to the Abrahamic text, Jonah and the Whale).

The surname is linguistically connected to several Semitic forms referencing the same tradition. It is considered a variant of the Hebrew word "Yona" (יוֹנָה) and Arabic words "Younes" (يونس), and "Nūn" (or "Dhul‑Nun," meaning "The Man of the Fish," as referenced in Surah Al‑Anbya, 21:87). These names ultimately trace back to the Aramaic form ''Nona'' or ''Nuna''.

People with the surname "Nona" are primarily Assyrian Christians from the Middle East, who are speakers of Neo-Aramaic dialects.

== Surname ==
- Emil Shimoun Nona (born 1967), patriarch of the Chaldean Catholic Church
- Gajaman Nona (1746–1815), Sri Lankan poet
- Tanu Nona (1902–1980), Australian pearler and politician

== See also ==
- Nona (disambiguation)
- Nona (given name)
