= Dirinon Parish close =

Church in Dirinon, Brittany, France

Coordinates: 48.3978°N 4.2686°W

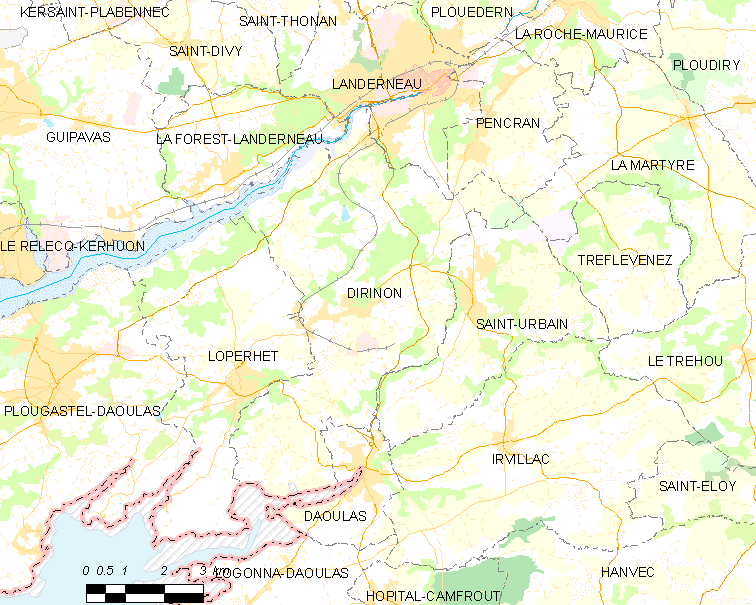
Map showing the location of Dirinon

The Dirinon Parish close (Enclos paroissial) is located at Dirinon in the Brest arrondissement in Brittany in north-western France. The enclosure church is dedicated to Saint Nonne and her son Divy and was built between 1588 and 1714. It has a 1618 south porch with statues of the apostles inside as well as a statue of Christ giving a blessing and holding a globe in his left hand. Apart from the church there is a chapel, small ossuary and a calvary. The church contains some superb altarpieces and sablières. The church is a listed historical monument since 1916. The name Dirinon is derived from the Breton "diri" which means an oak (chênes) and Sainte Nonne.

== The chapel of Saint Nonne ==
Dating to 1577, this chapel was built around the tomb of Saint Nonne (the gisant and its decoration is attributed to the Atelier du Folgoët) which is dated to 1450. It is a rectangular building with a small domed bell tower. The gisant marking the tomb depicts the saint laying full length with a book in her hands. Her head rests on a cushion held by two angels and at her feet is a dragon. The base of the tomb is decorated with six panels with reliefs depicting the twelve apostles and the coats of arms of those who funded the construction of the tomb and chapel. especially Simon de Kerbringal, although most of the reliefs were chiseled away during the French revolution. The decoration of the chapel is completed by statues of Saint Nonne, Saint Anne, Saint Catherine, Saint Fiacre, Saint Divi and Saint Helen. The chapel currently serves as a museum. There is a small statue of Saint Nonne in a niche over the chapel entrance door. There is also a stained glass window dedicated to Saint Nonne in the church .

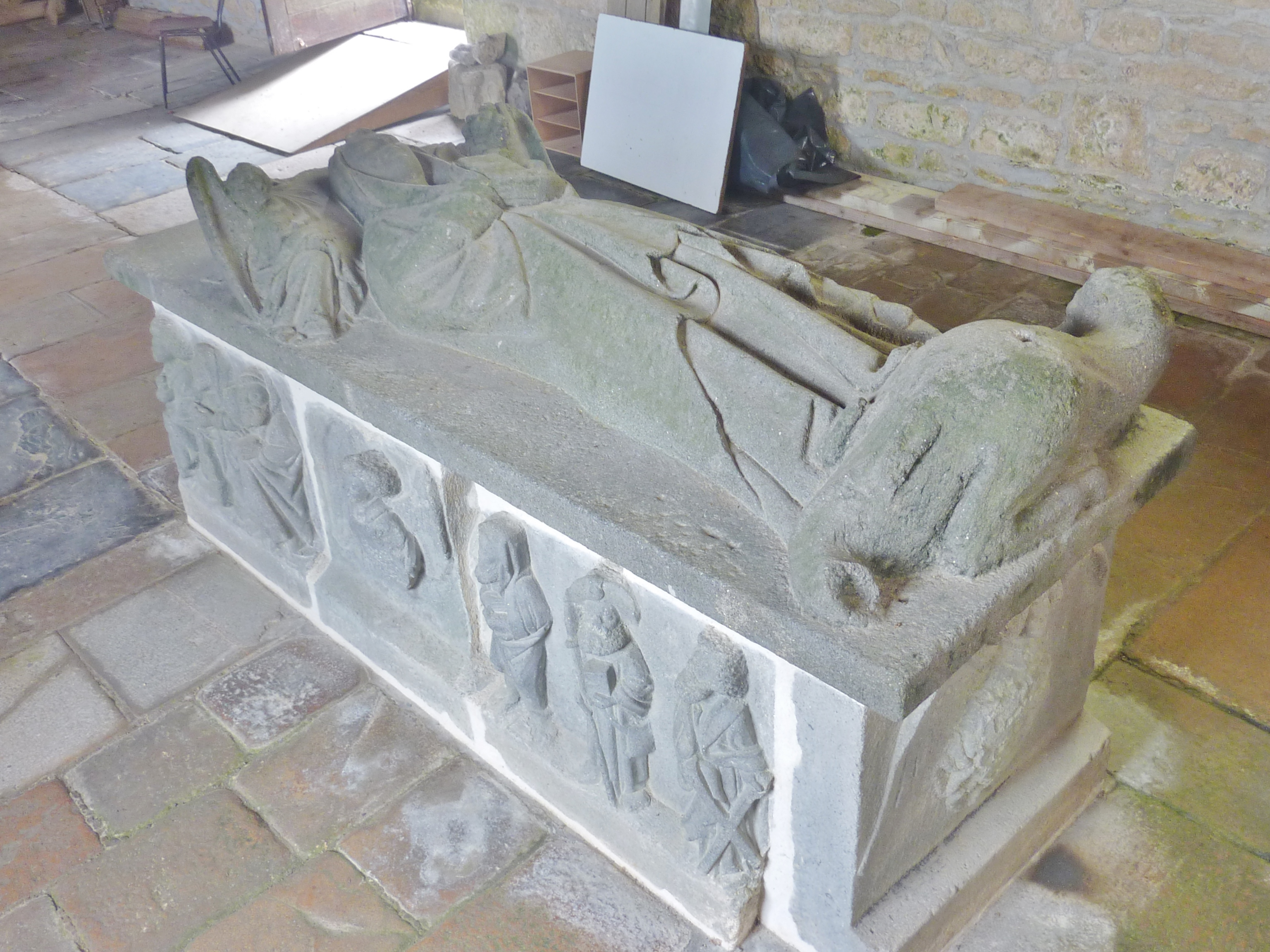
The gisant of Saint Nonne. The tomb is located in the middle of the nave and is 2.30 metres long. Note the dragon at her feet and the panels depicting the apostles around the base. Saint Nonne's feet point eastwards to the altar.

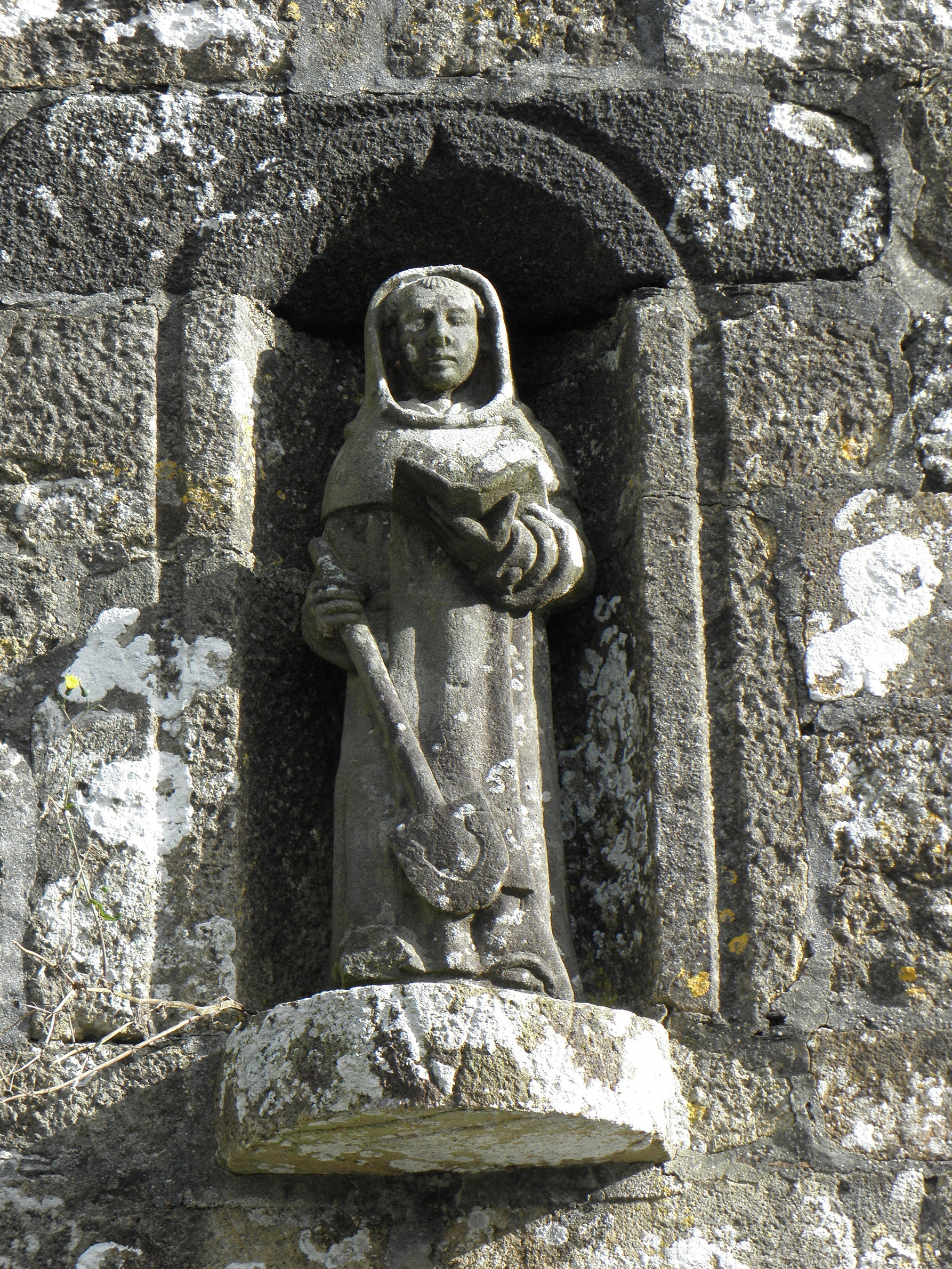
Statue of Saint Nonne over the entrance to the chapel.

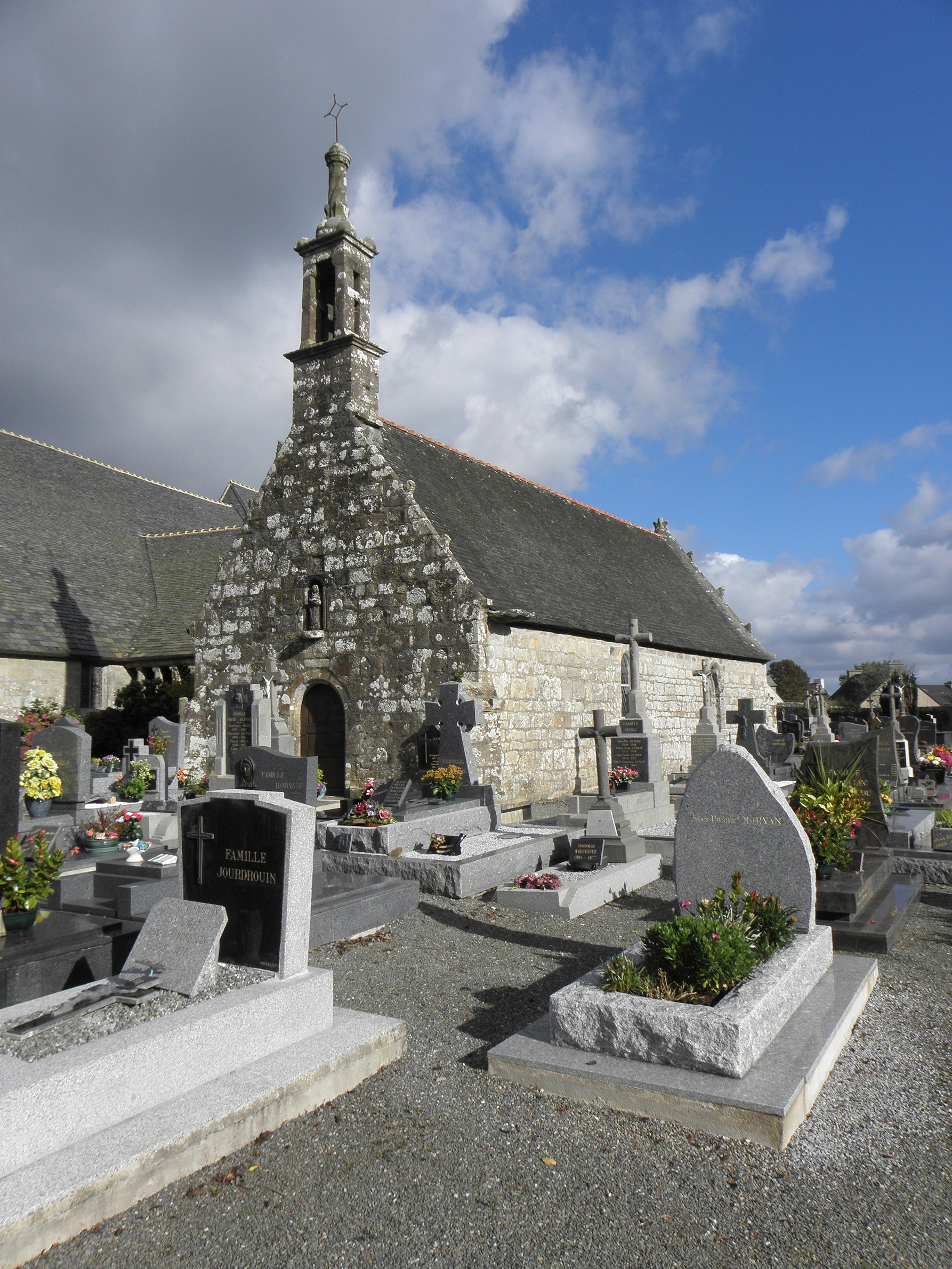
The Sainte Nonne Chapel.

== The South Porch ==
This dates to 1618 according to an inscription on the statue of the "Holy Father". Much later this statue was used for the depiction of the "Holy Father" which formed part of the "Trinité" altarpiece. Inside the porch are some sablières and statues of the apostles.

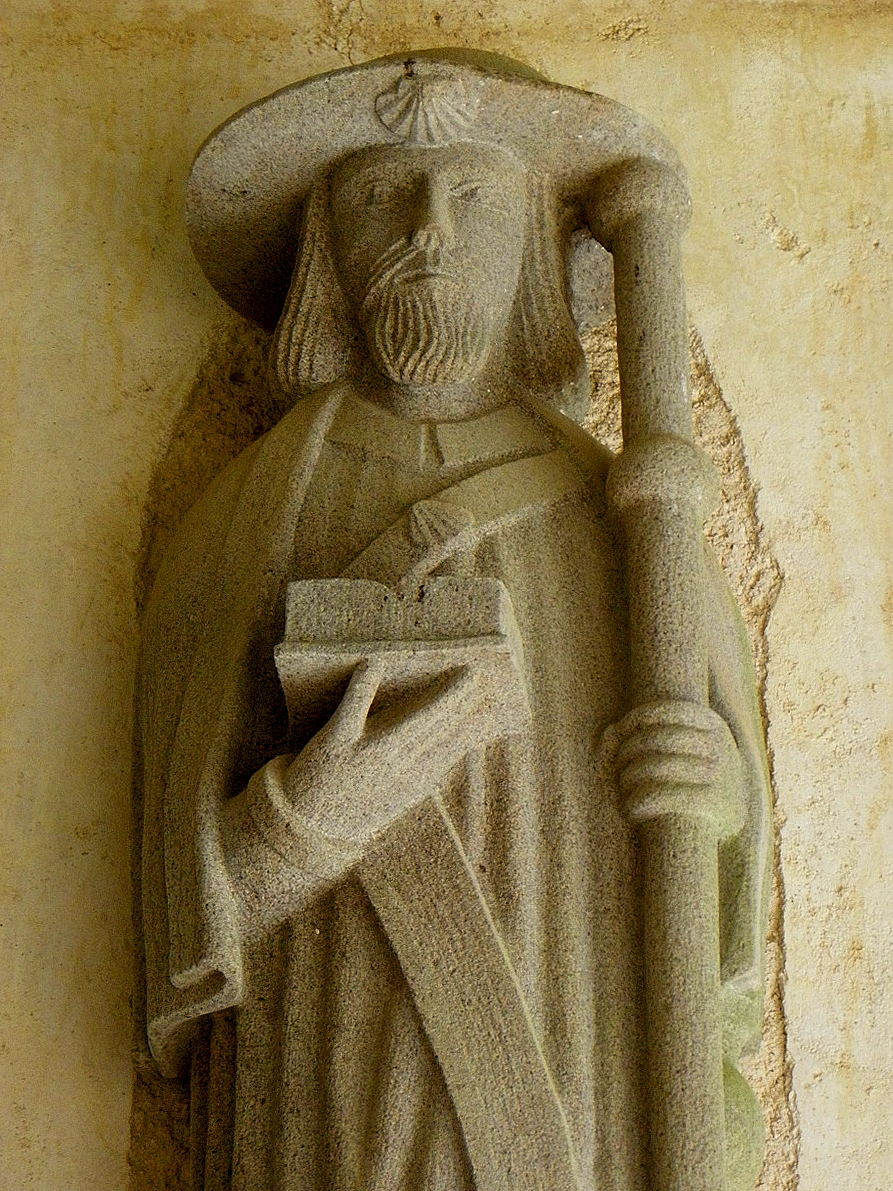
James the Greater. Note the pilgrim's hat and the shell emblem.

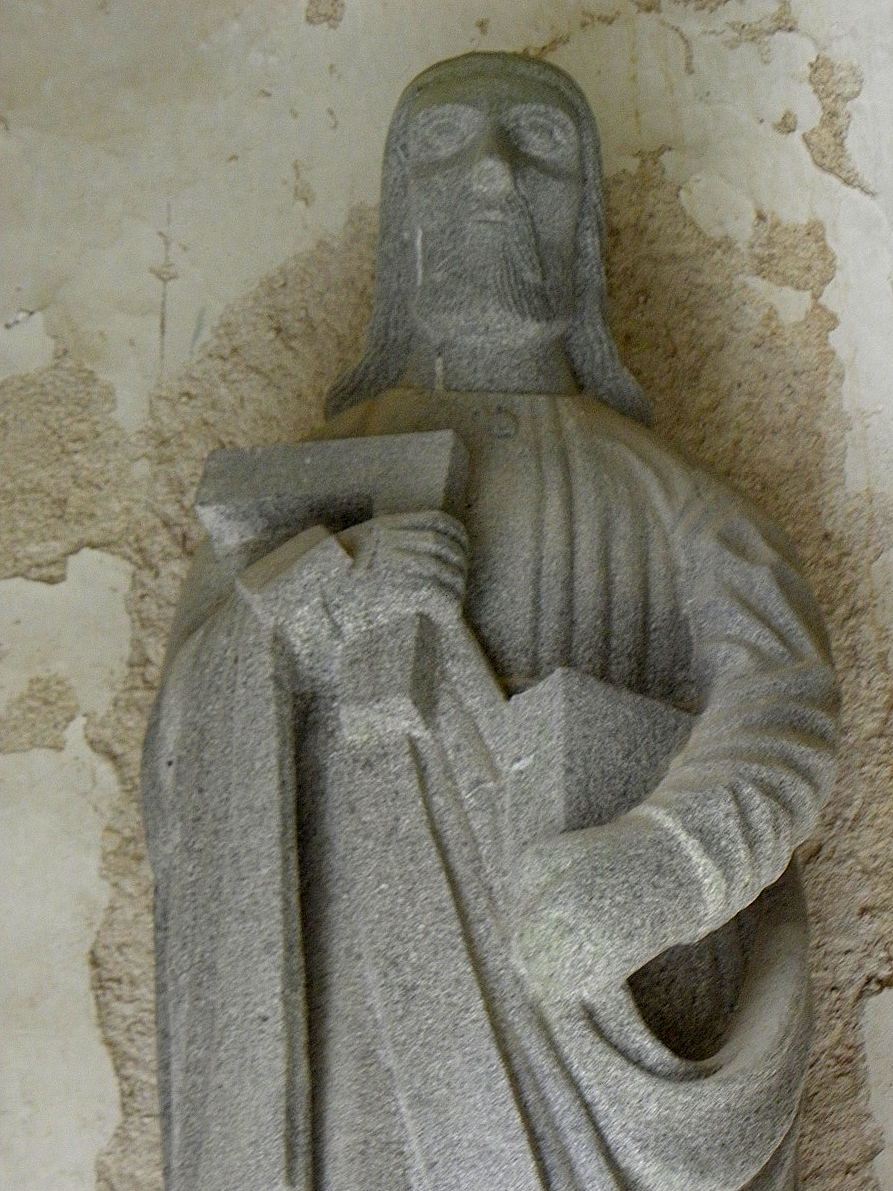
Saint Thomas. Note the set square.

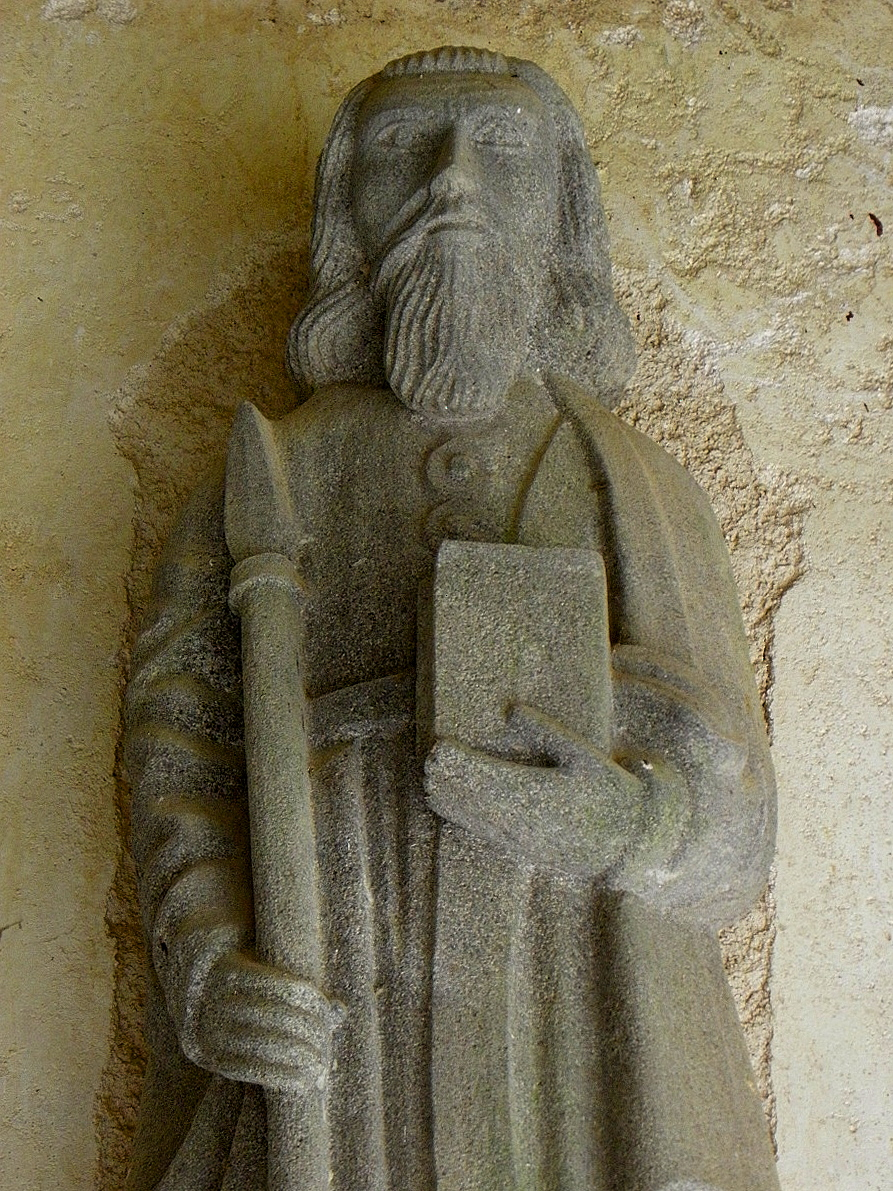
Saint Matthias. One of the apostles in the south porch.

== The calvary ==
The 15th-century calvary is a modest one by Breton standards and is thought to be the oldest part of the enclosure. It stands to the north-east of the Sainte-Nonne chapel and, therefore, south-east of the church, the traditional place for a calvary to be located. In the calvary, Jesus has the Virgin Mary and John the Evangelist on either side when viewed from the west, and on the eastern side are depictions of Saint Peter with his key and Mary Magdalene surrounding the Virgin Mary with child.

== Processional banner ==
The church has some magnificent processional banners. See Procession.

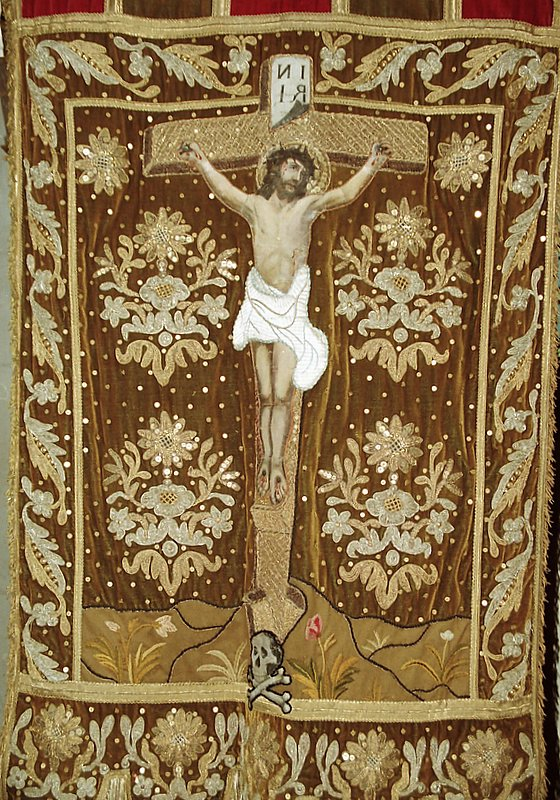
A processional banner in the Sainte-Nonne church depicting Christ's crucifixion. Note the "Ankou" at the base of the cross.

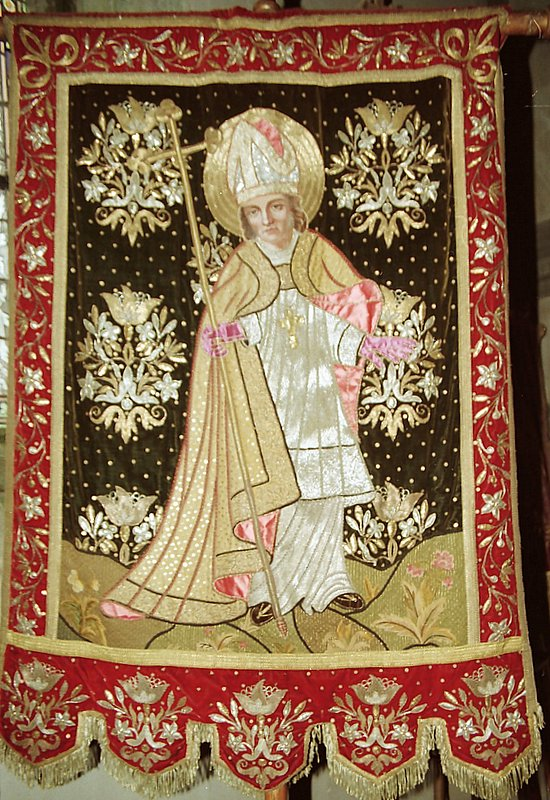
A second processional banner.

== The bell tower ==
The church has a galleried bell tower dating from 1588 to 1593. The double-galleried belfry is surmounted by a spire surrounded by four pinnacles. An old bell by Jacques Le Louarn dating to 1655 has survived. The spire is in what is known as the "léonard" style. The south-west buttress carries the date 1588. The bell tower was hit by lightning damaging the upper part, firstly in 1774 and then 1951, but the damage was repaired though the variation in brickwork does detract from the tower's overall appeal.

== The altarpieces ==
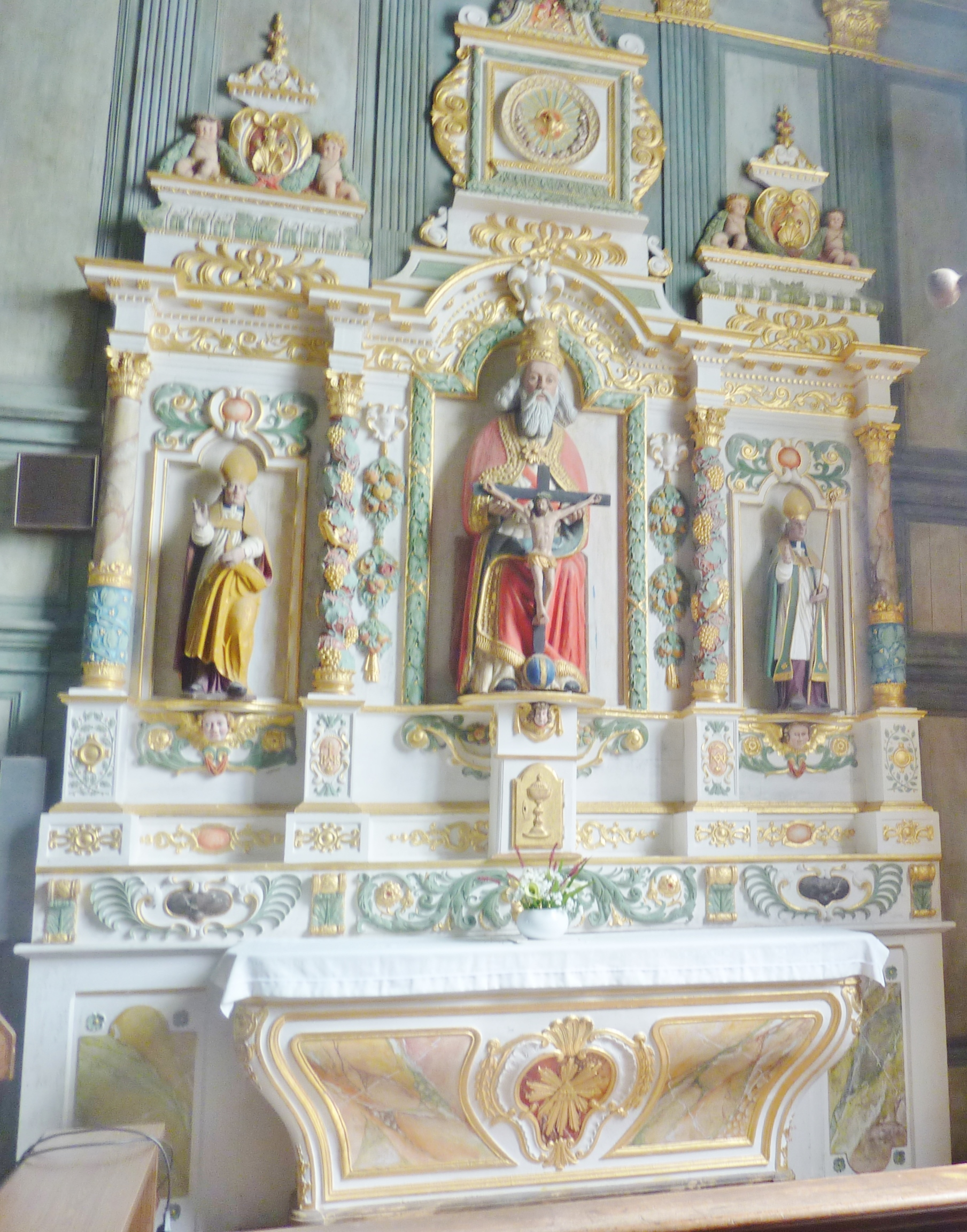
The altarpiece of the Trinity. Note the twisted columns ("colonnes torsés").

- The "Altar of the Holy Trinity" shown above is to be found in the south transept and has a beautiful altarpiece which includes a depiction of Saint Corentin and his fish.
- The Altar of the "Rosary" is located in the north transept and the altarpiece includes 15 medallions depicting the life of the Virgin Mary. This altarpiece is the work of Pierre Fenestre. The altarpiece paintings are by Jean-Louis Nicolas.

== The chevet's stained glass window ==
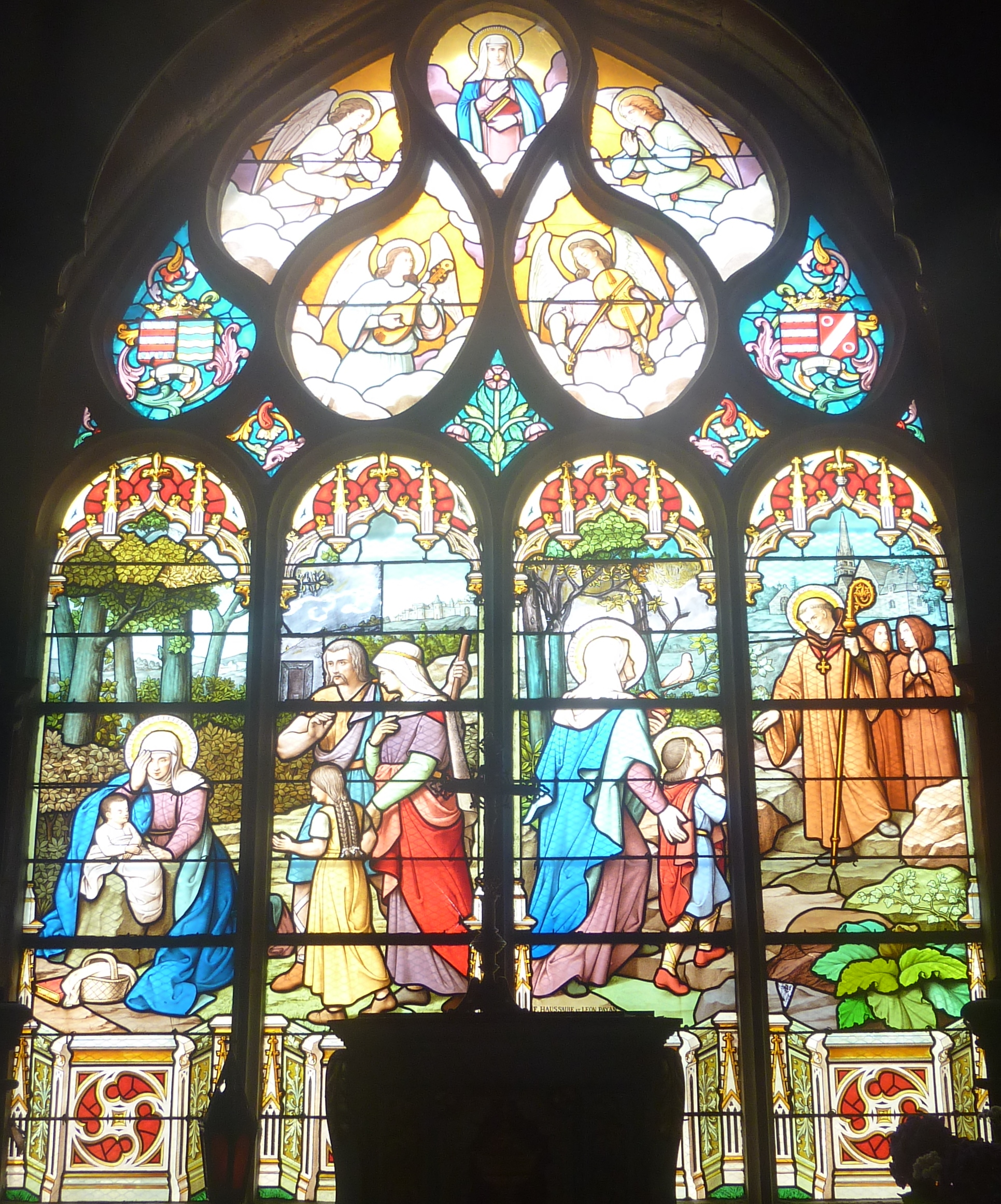
The window dedicated to Sainte Nonne.

The chevet's principal window dates to 1923 and is dedicated to Sainte Nonne. The two lancets in the left side of the window recall the welcome given by the local people to Sainte Nonne and her son Divy shown here being baptised, whilst the two lancets on the right side show the saint taking her son to a monastery where she is greeted by an abbot and two monks. See photograph of window above.

== Silver reliquary ==
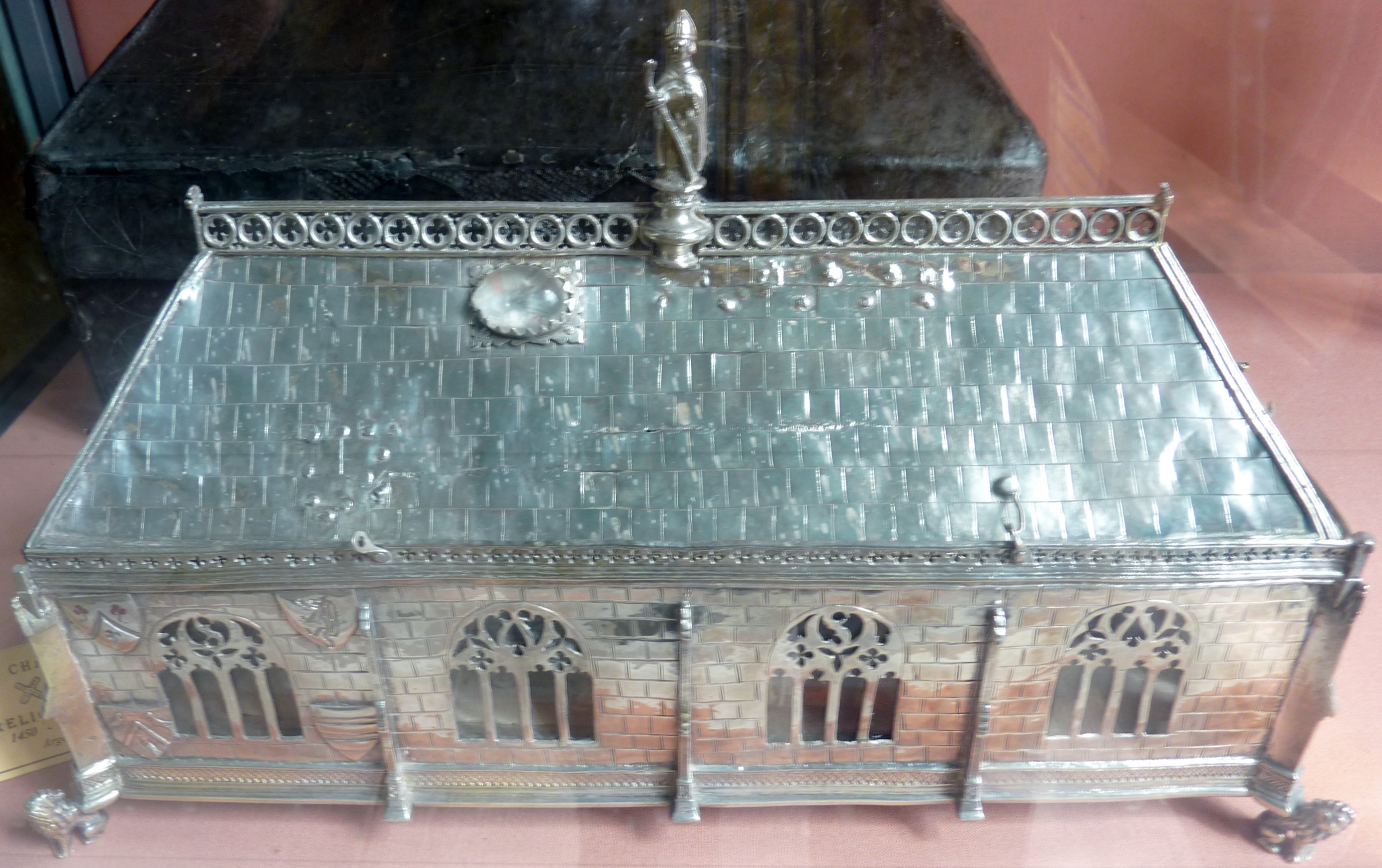

In the church, there is a silver reliquary dedicated to Sainte Nonne. It takes the form of a chapel and bears the arms of Lezquivit, Lezuzan and Kerbingal.

== Sainte Nonne's arrival in Brittany ==
Sainte Nonne had come to Brittany from Wales. In the Our Lady and Saint Non's chapel in St Davids in Wales a stained glass window dating to 1934 celebrates her arrival in Brittany with her son. See photograph in gallery.

== Paintings in the Sainte-Nonne church's vaults ==
In the interior of the church roof are several paintings of saints executed between 1856 and 1858, by the painter Jean-Louis Nicolas.

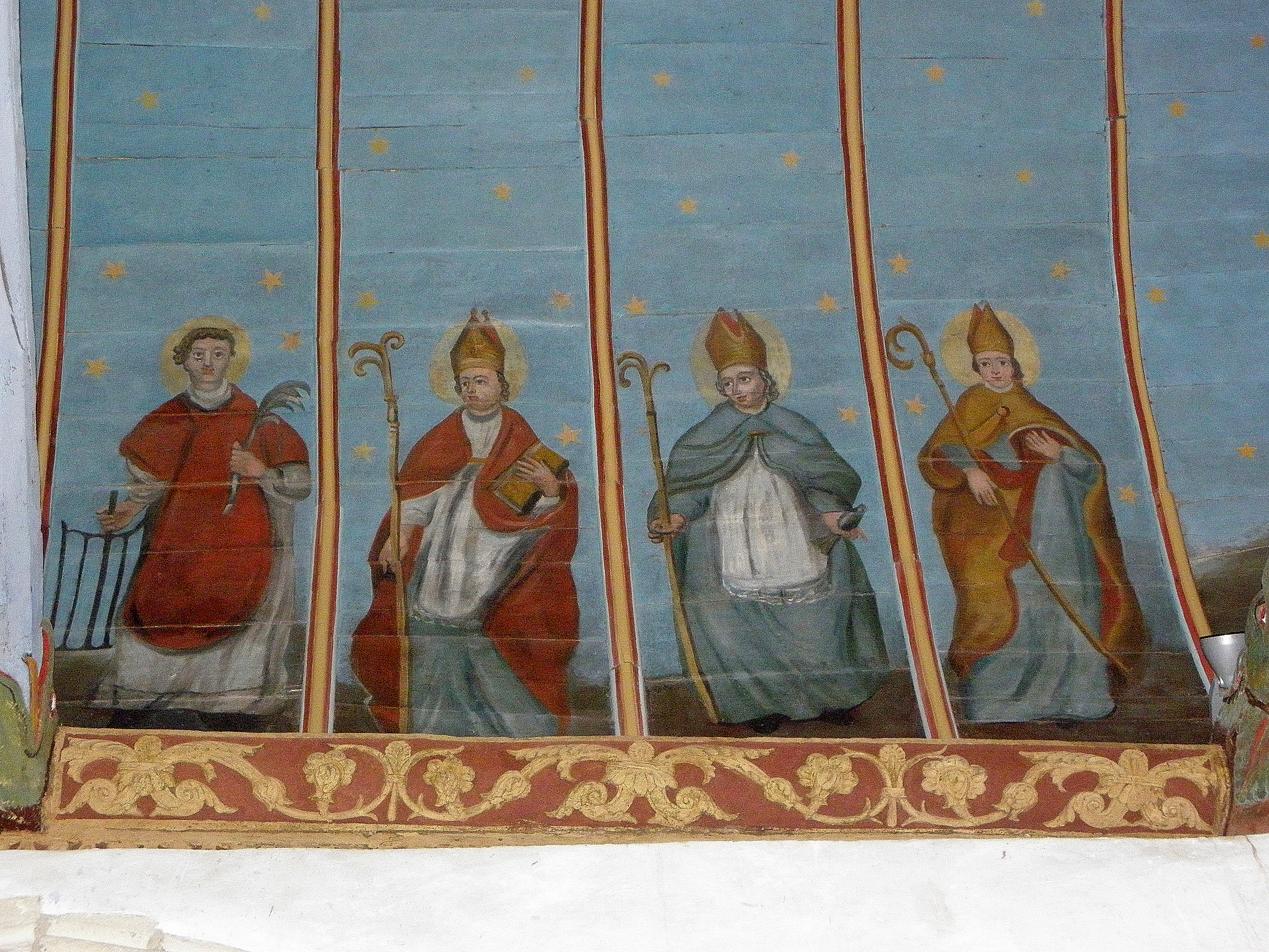
Paintings in the church ceiling (voûte).

== Painting in the vault of the choir ("Voûte du choeur") ==
Painted in 1715 and restored in 1857 by Jean-Louis Nicolas, this work depicts the last judgement ("jugement dernier") and features the Holy Trinity and the four evangelists recognized by their attributes. Behind them are "foule des élus" and the heads of several cherubs. There are further paintings in the vault of the transept. On the eastern side are depictions of the apostles and on the western side are depictions of the Doctors of the church. These were also restored by Nicolas.

== Sablières and blochets ==
The church has some magnificent sablières and blochets. The sablière is a horizontal wooden beam running along the top of a wall where it joins the roof. Often carved and painted, these beams were interspersed with carved blocks or "blochets".

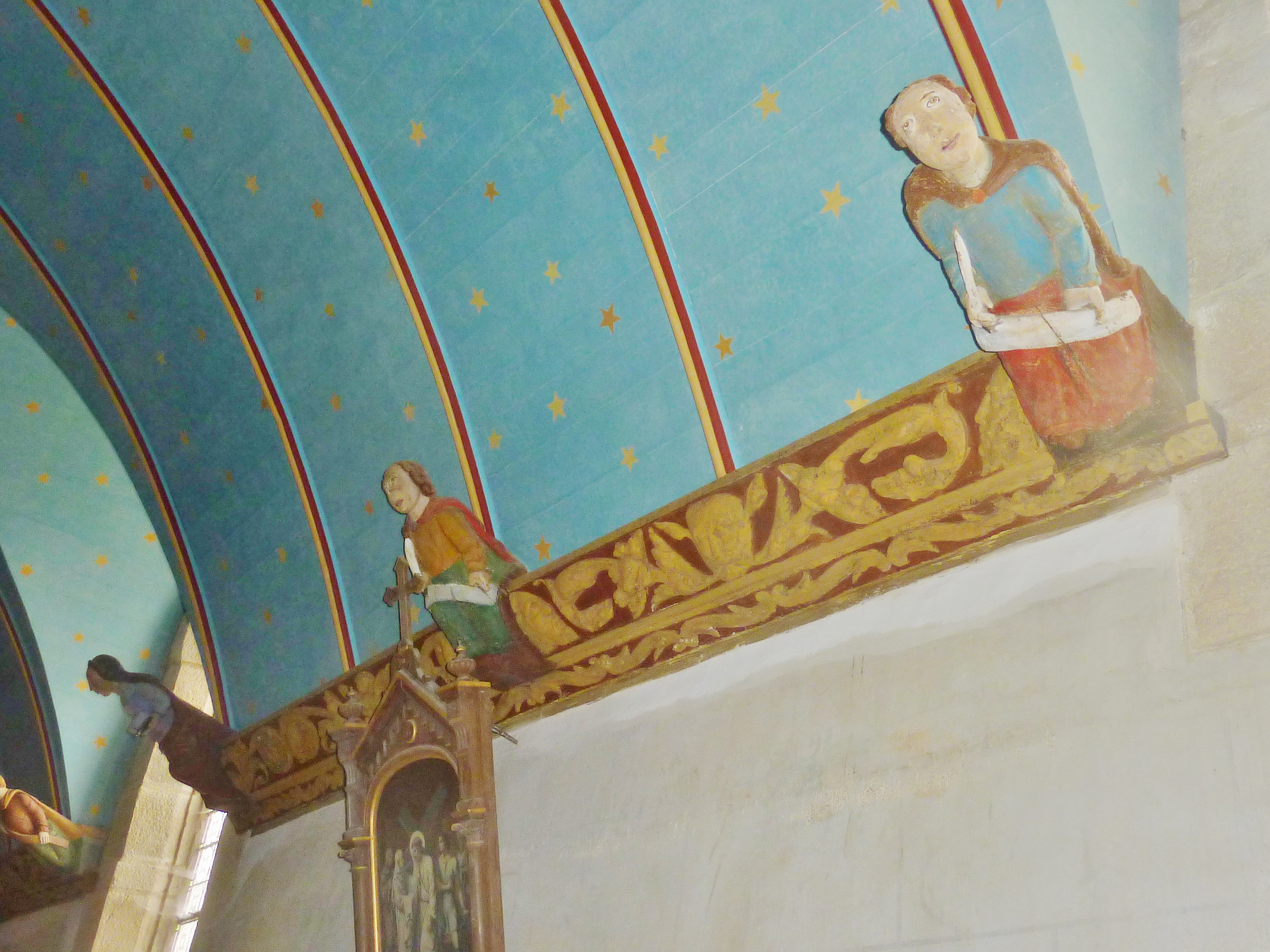
View of sablières and blochets.

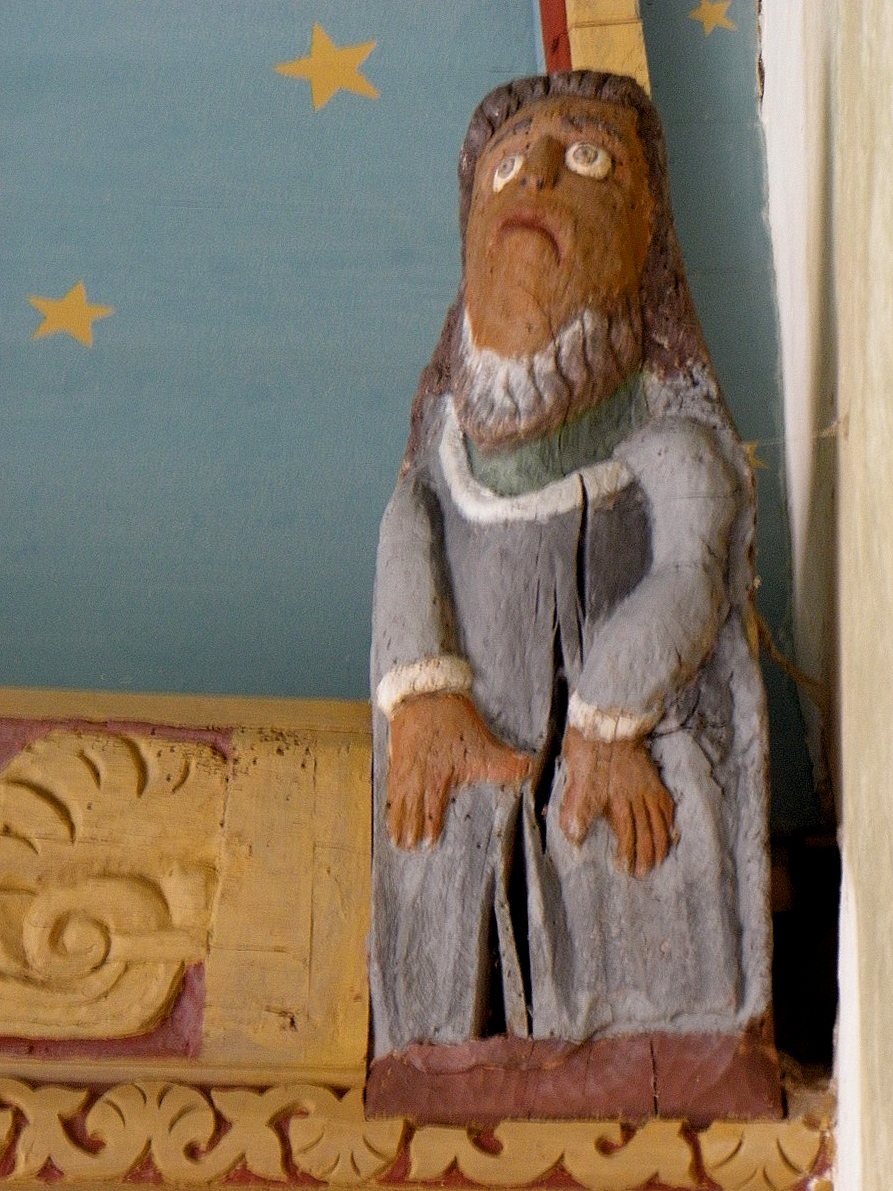
One of the carved figures ("blochets") spaced at intervals on the sablière.

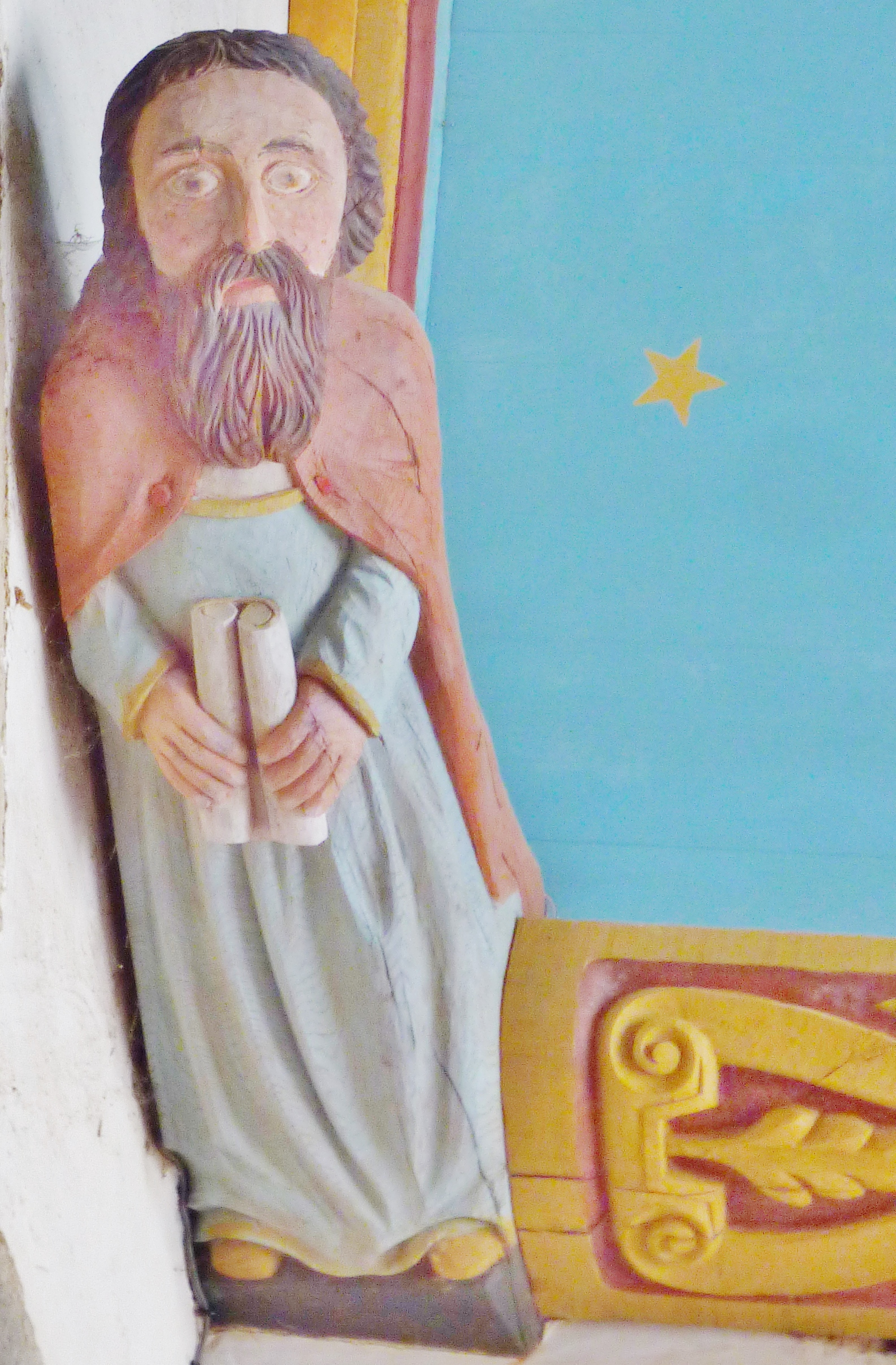
A blochet at the end of one of the Sainte-Nonne church's sablières.

== Gallery of images ==
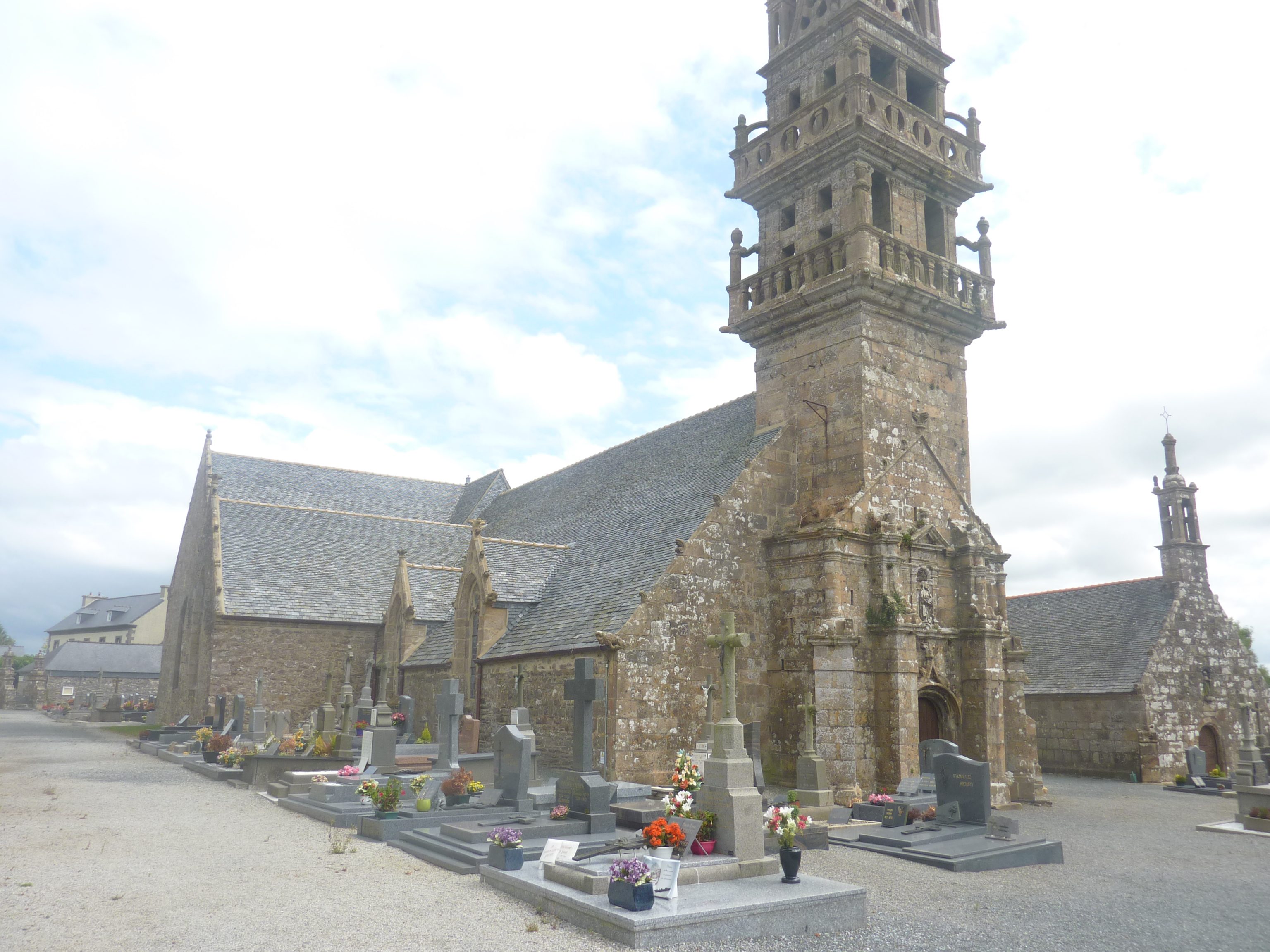
The Église Sainte-Nonne . The chapel Sainte-Nonne can be seen at the rear.

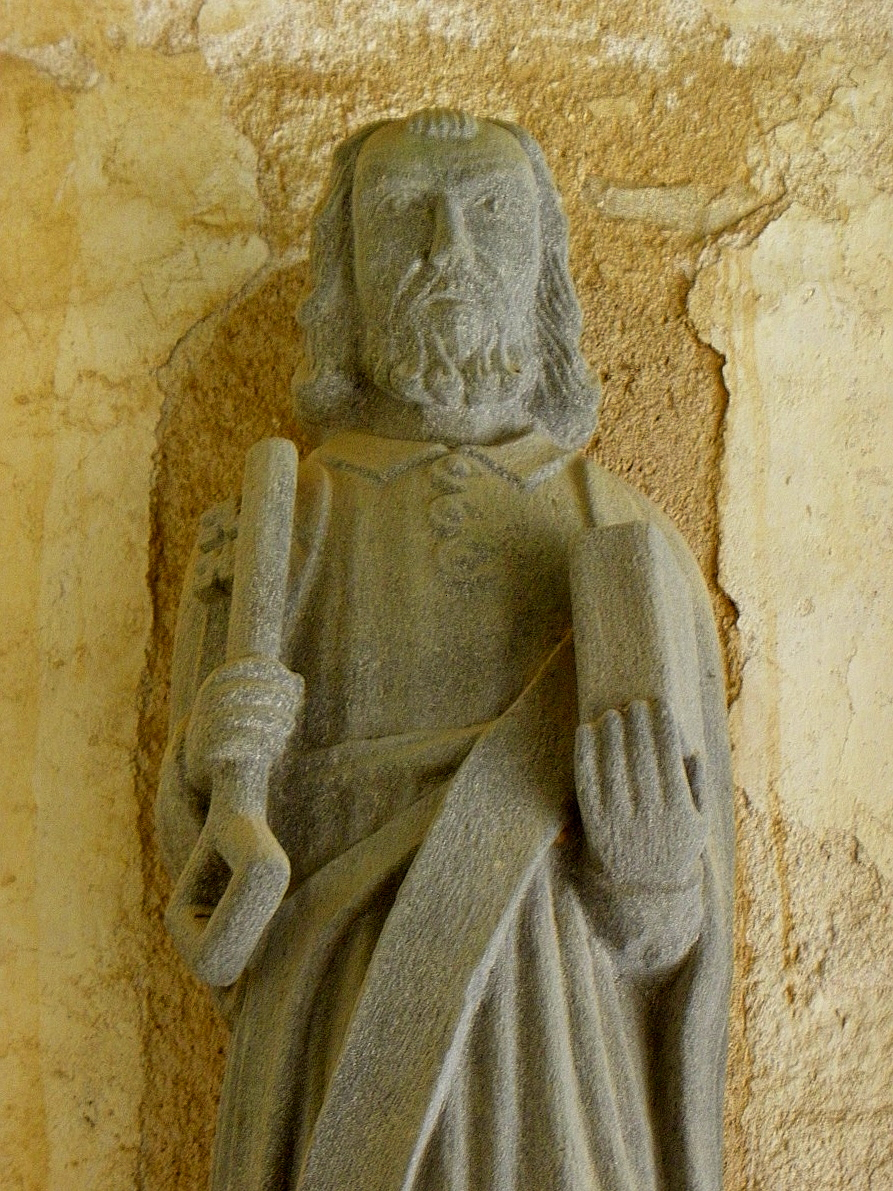
The statue of Saint Peter with key and book in the south porch of the Église Sainte-Nonne.

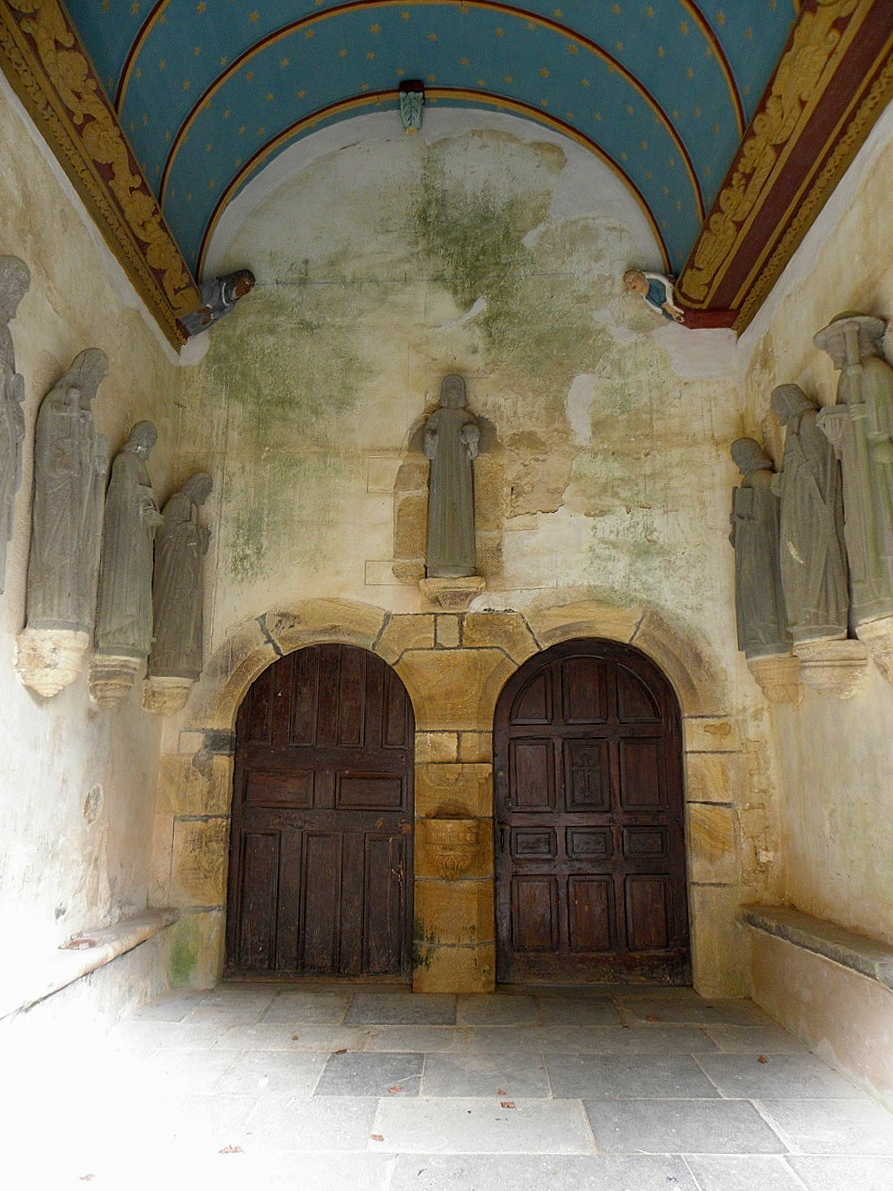
Inside the south porch with a view of the two doors accessing the church. Note the carved sablières at the top of the wall and above the statues of the apostles.

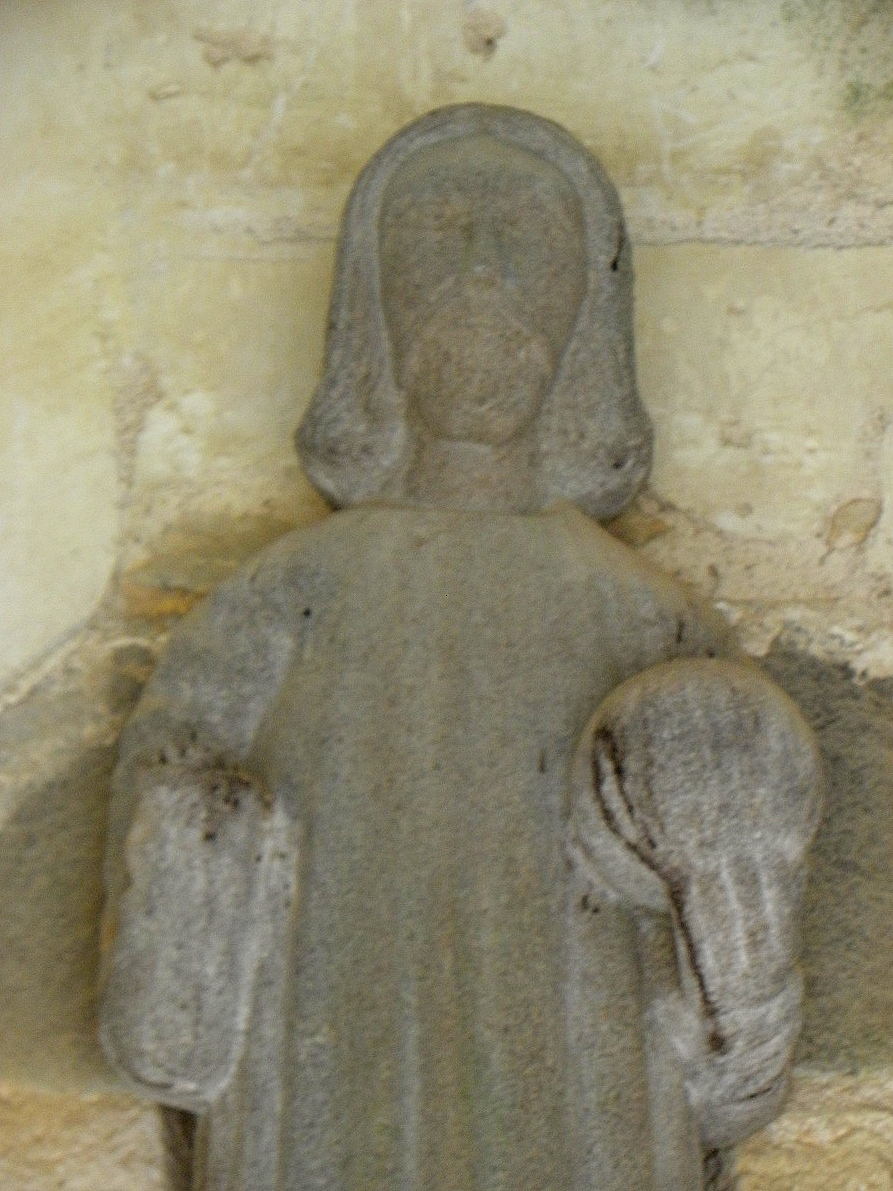
Christ the Redeemer.

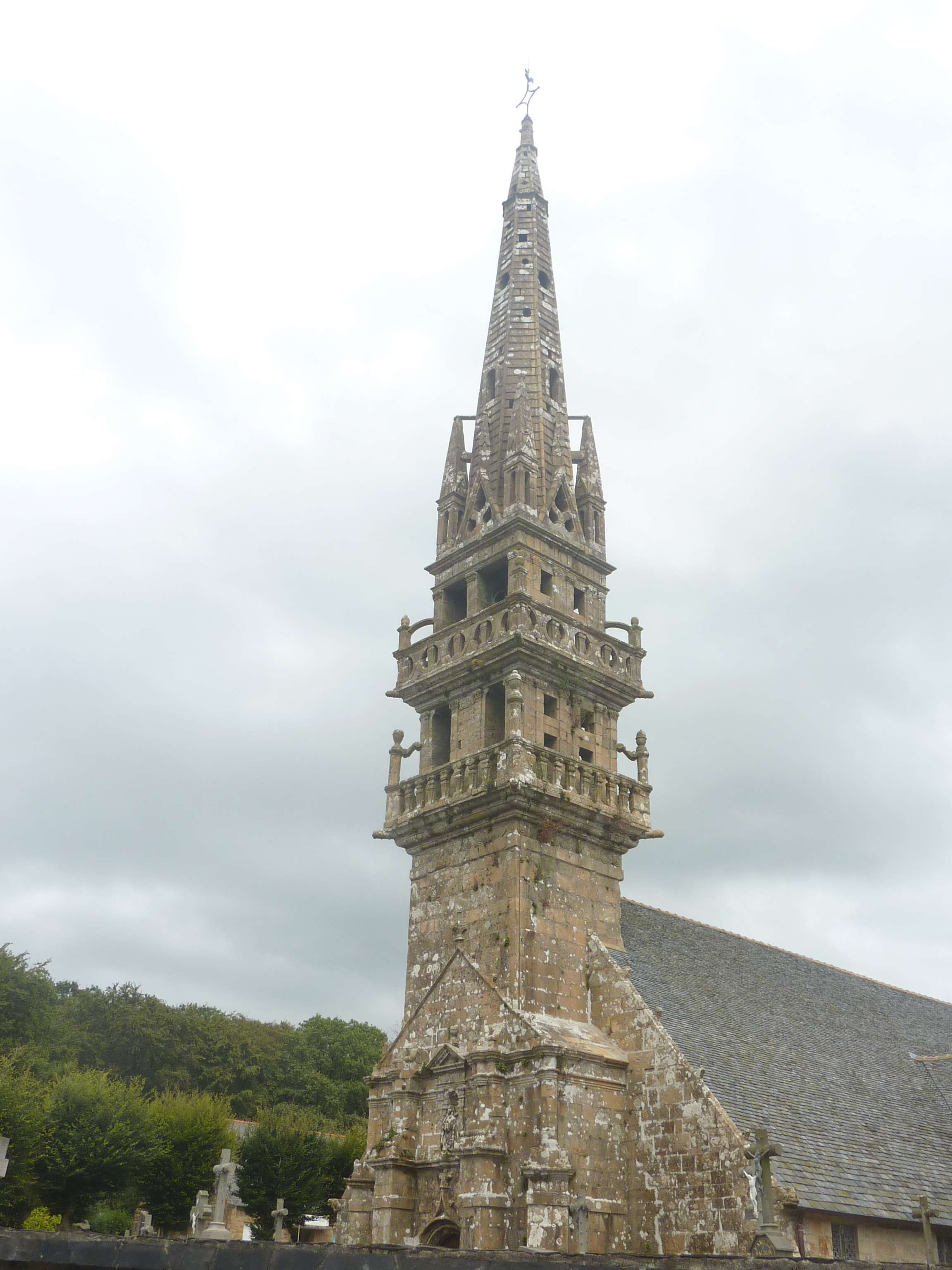
The superb galleried bell-tower.

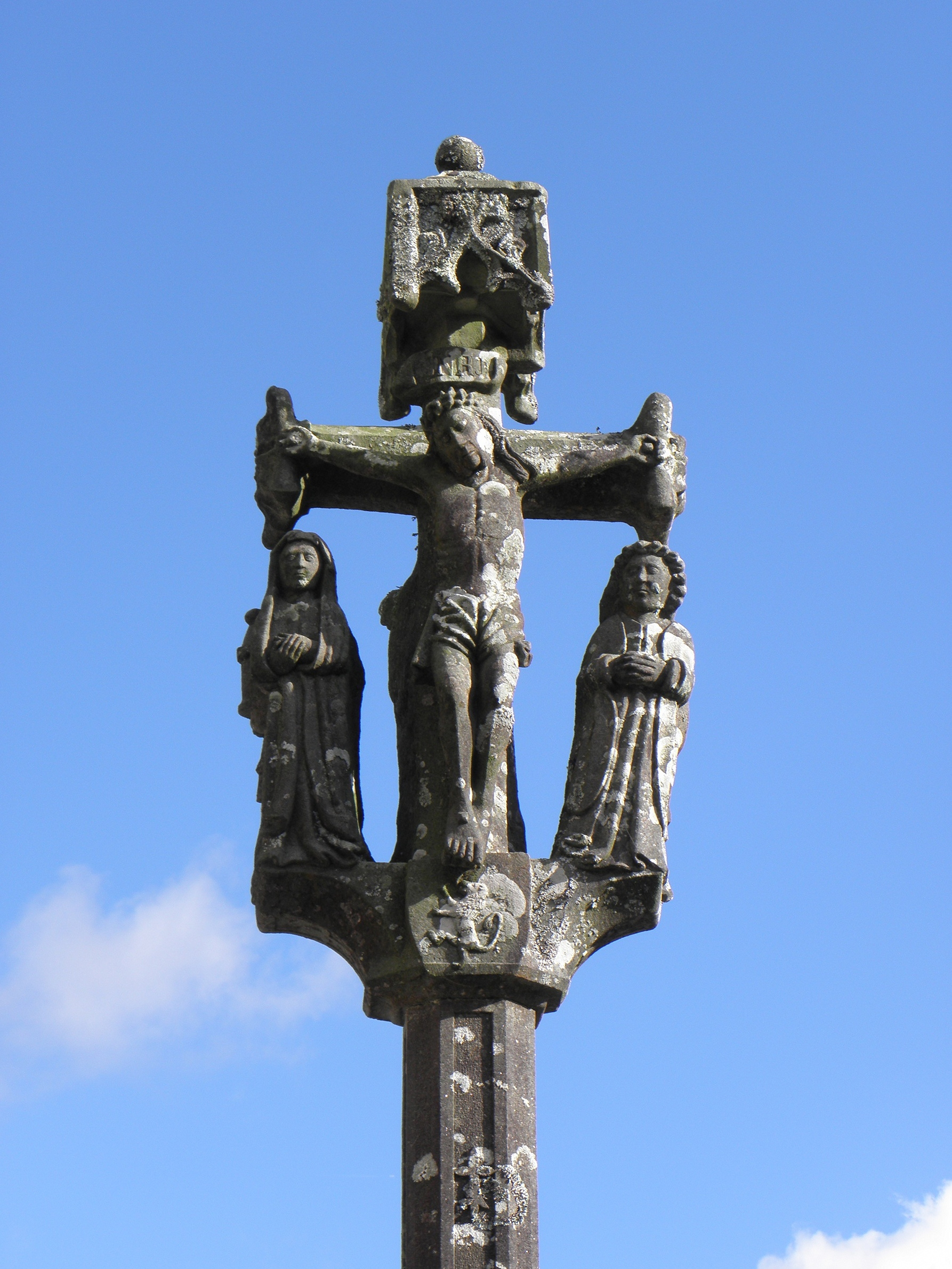
The calvary at Dirinon.

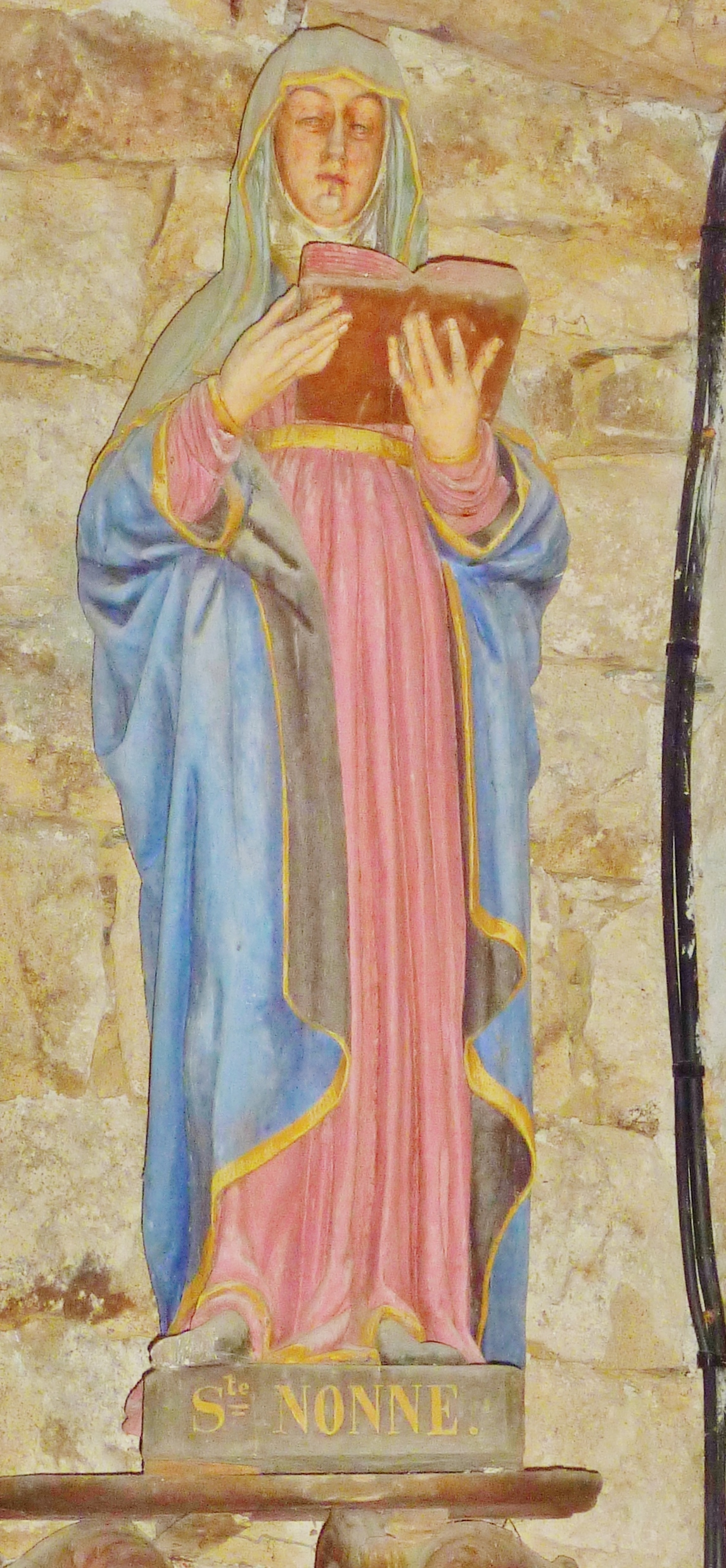
Statue of Saint Nonne.

== See also ==
- Culture of France
- French architecture
- History of France
- Religion in France
- Roman Catholicism in France
