= Nona (given name) =

Nona is a feminine given name or nickname. It may refer to:

- Saint Nona, a Christian saint of whom little is known
- Nona Balakian (1918–1991), Armenian-American literary critic and an editor
- Nona L. Brooks (1861–1945), leader in the New Thought movement
- Nona Byrne (1922–2012), British Roman Catholic philanthropist
- Nona Fernández (born 1971), Chilean actress, author, and screenwriter
- Nona Freeman (1916–2009), evangelist, author and missionary
- Nona Gaprindashvili (born 1941), Georgian chess player
- Nona Gaye (born 1974), African-American singer, fashion model and screen actress, daughter of Motown singer Marvin Gaye
- Nona Hendryx (born 1944), member of the R&B group LaBelle
- Nona Rutland (1907–1980), American horsewoman
- Nona Willis-Aronowitz (born 1984), American author and editor
