= Llanon =

Village in Ceredigion, Wales

Coordinates: 52.28245°N 4.17902°W

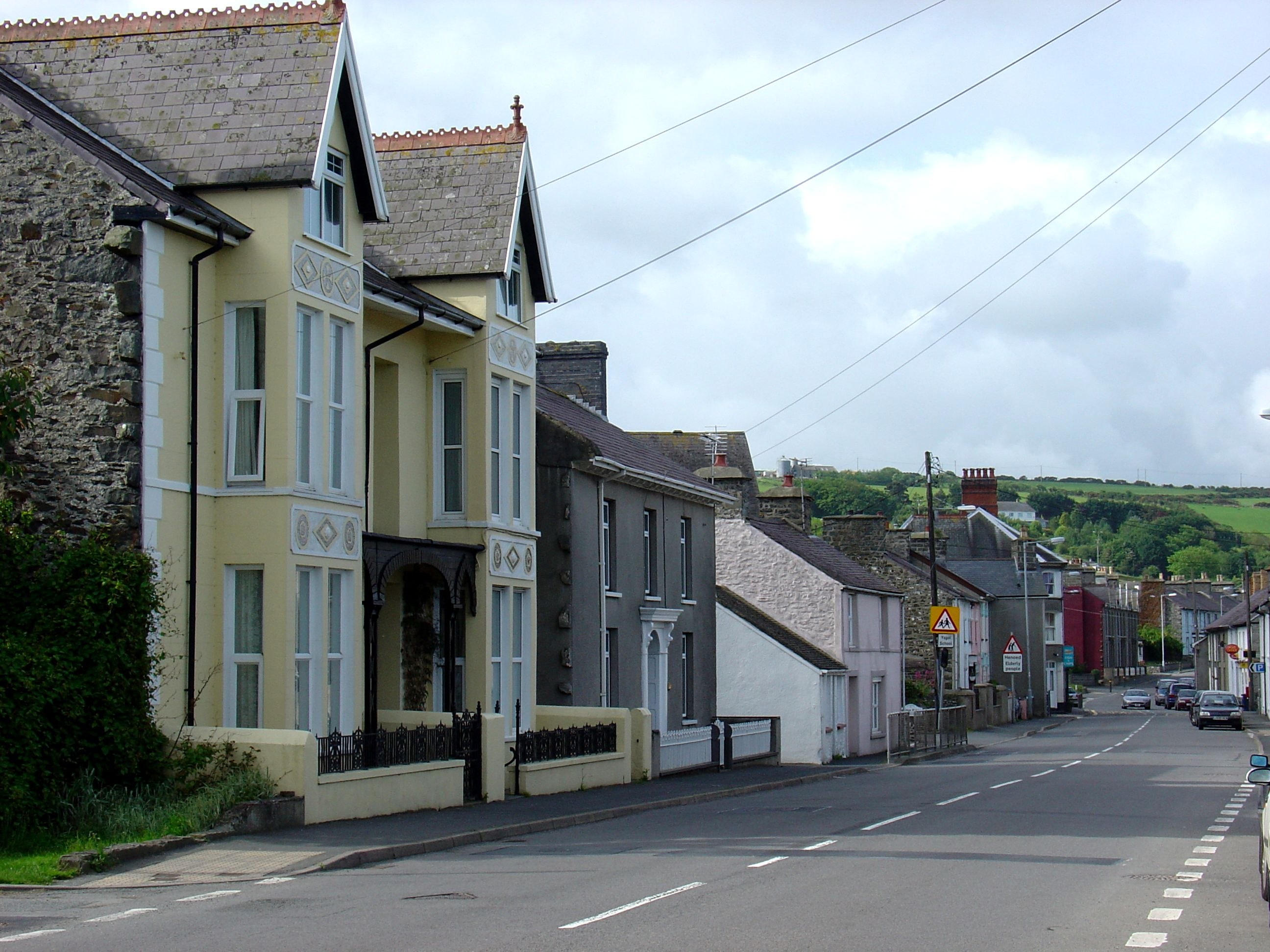
- Main street of Llanon

- Location within Ceredigion
- Population: 256 (2011 census, Llansantffraed)
- OS grid reference: SN515671
- Principal area: Ceredigion
- Preserved county: Dyfed
- Country: Wales
- Sovereign state: United Kingdom
- Post town: LLANON
- Postcode district: SY23 5
- Dialling code: 01974
- Police: Dyfed-Powys
- Fire: Mid and West Wales
- Ambulance: Welsh
- UK Parliament: Ceredigion Preseli
- Senedd Cymru – Welsh Parliament: Ceredigion Penfro

Llanon (Welsh pronunciation: [ɬanˈɔn]; also spelled Llan-non) is a village in Ceredigion, Wales. It adjoins the village of Llansantffraed on the coast of Cardigan Bay, 5 mi (8.0 km) north of Aberaeron and 11 miles (18 km) south of Aberystwyth on the A487 road. It is situated on a raised beach. The village is named after the church of Saint Non (Llan-Non), the mother of Saint David. By tradition, St David was born and brought up in Llanon.

== History ==
The village prospered in the 18th and 19th centuries, with industries rooted in the land and on the sea. In 1861, shipbuilding employed 130 men out of a population of 1,300. It was at this period that much of the village was developed; several Nonconformist chapels and a school were built, and the village enjoyed a large range of shops and services including five pubs and a brewery, three blacksmiths, shoemakers, wheelwrights and a bakery. The primary school, Ysgol Gynradd Llannon, overlooks the village and Cardigan Bay.

The Ceredigion County Council museum service owns Llanon Cottage, a two-roomed 18th-century cottage, which is regularly opened to the public.

The beach is made of pebble and stone with areas of sand exposed at low tide and backed by boulder clay sea cliffs which are receding through attack by the sea. A beach area south of the village is notable for its ancient fishing pools, reputedly built by the monks of Strata Florida Abbey. These pools were created using large stones from the beach to create a U-shaped wall from the high-tide line, which is totally submerged at high tide. As the tide recedes, fish are trapped in the pools but do not die, as they are retained in the shallow water by the walls.

=== Notable people ===
- Catrin Finch, for a time harpist to the Prince of Wales, was born and grew up in Llanon.
