= Nona (2017 film) =

- Directed by: Michael Polish
- Written by: Michael Polish
- Produced by: Kate Bosworth
- Starring: Sulem Calderon; Jesy McKinney; Jasper Polish; Kate Bosworth
- Cinematography: Michael Polish
- Edited by: Aidan Haley
- Music by: Stuart Matthewman
- Production company: Make Pictures
- Distributed by: North of Two
- Release date: 10 September 2017
- Running time: 92 minutes
- Country: United States
- Languages: English; Spanish

Nona is a 2017 American drama film directed by Michael Polish, starring Sulem Calderon, Jesy McKinney, Jasper Polish and Kate Bosworth.

== Cast ==
- Sulem Calderon as Nona
- Jesy McKinney as Hecho
- Jasper Polish as Marty
- Kate Bosworth as Detective
- Giancarlo Ruiz as Billy
- Lilly Melgar as Madame Mariposa

== Reception ==
Lorry Kikta of Film Threat gave the film a score of 8/10 and wrote that the film "flies by in an hour and a half but somehow manages to encapsulate so much emotional truth and heartbreaking beauty over its short runtime."

Nick Allen of RogerEbert.com rated the film 2.5 stars out of 4, writing that the film "struggles with a vital balance of Nona’s intimate perspective, and Polish’s desire to create atmosphere with an outsider's eye."

Dennis Harvey of Variety wrote that the film "greatly improves if you view it not as a problematic, lopsided attempt to convey the personal danger and political urgency of current migration trends, but as a small, impressionistic two-character piece that veers earnestly if misguidedly into larger issues in its closing lap."
