= Nona Freeman =

American missionary (1916–2009)

- Born: July 25, 1916
- Died: December 25, 2009 (aged 93)
- Spouse: E. L. "Bug" Freeman (d.1999)
- Title: Rev.

Nona Freeman (July 25, 1916 – December 26, 2009) was an American Oneness Pentecostal preacher, columnist, evangelist, author, and missionary to Africa.

== Biography ==
In 1948 Freeman and her husband E. L. "Bug" Freeman were the first United Pentecostal Church International (UPCI) missionaries to South Africa. The couple served there for 41 years, returning to the United States every five to seven years to raise funds.

After the death of E.L. Freeman in 1999, Nona Freeman continued to travel as an evangelist and became a popular speaker among some Oneness Pentecostal groups. In January 2009 Freeman suffered a stroke which lead to significant reduction of her previous schedule. On December 8, 2009, Nona Freeman entered hospice care, dying at home on December 26, 2009.
