= St Nonna's Church, Altarnun =

Church on Bodmin Moor, Cornwall, England

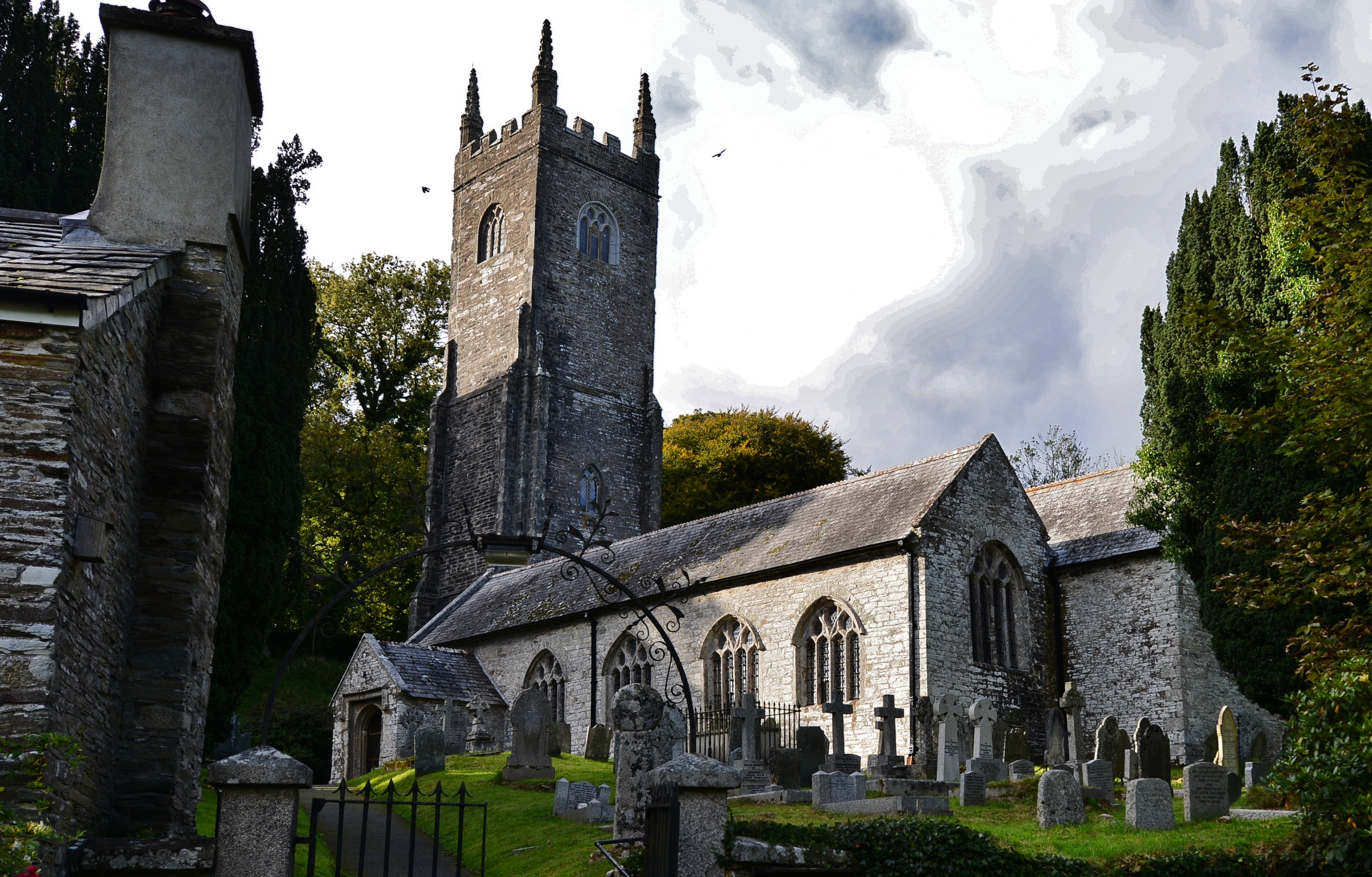

- Location in Cornwall
- 50.604608°N 4.512809°W
- Denomination: Church of England
- Previous denomination: Roman Catholic
- Website: St Nonna, Altarnon

History
- Dedication: Saint Nonna

Administration
- Province: Canterbury
- Diocese: Truro
- Archdeaconry: Bodmin
- Deanery: Trigg Major
- Parish: Altarnun

Clergy
- Vicar: Rev. Andrew Balfour

Listed Building – Grade I
- Official name: Church of St Nonna
- Designated: 22 November 1960
- Reference no.: 1142805

St Nonna's Church, also known as the Cathedral of the Moors, is the second largest church on Bodmin Moor, Cornwall, located in the village of Altarnun (meaning: "altar of Nonn"). The dedication is to Saint Non or Nonna, who was the mother of St David. The church is mentioned in Daphne du Maurier's Jamaica Inn; it is the church in which the evil vicar of Altarnun Francis Davey depicts himself in a painting as a wolf while the members of his congregation have the heads of sheep.

The church is an active Anglican parish church in the deanery of Trigg Major, the archdeaconry of Bodmin, and the diocese of Truro. Its benefice is united with those of Saint Sidwell and Saint Gulval, Laneast, and Saint Clederus, St Clether. The church is recorded in the National Heritage List for England as a designated Grade I listed building.

== History ==
The oldest fabric dates back to the Norman era. Most of the church dates from the later part of the 15th century, at which time the north and south aisles were added. The church was restored in 1867 by E. Sedding.

== Architecture ==
It is a building largely of the 15th century in the Perpendicular style, with a tower 109 ft (33 m) high. It is notable for the fine Norman font and the amount of old woodwork, including the screen, bench-ends and communion rails which date to 1684.

The screen is one of the finest 15th century examples in Cornwall; it has three gates and the cornice of vines and tracery and vaulting are finely carved. The 79 bench-end carvings were executed by Robert Daye between 1510 and 1530 (Pevsner attributes them to 1524 or later) and portray a range of subjects including a Cornish piper and fiddler (Daye's name is given on one but the date is illegible). Also, one of the damaged pew ends was repaired to its former glory by the late local master joiner Douglas Edwards in the 1980s. Langdon (1896) records seven stone crosses in the parish, of which one is in the churchyard.

The church has a peal of eight bells.

=== Gallery ===
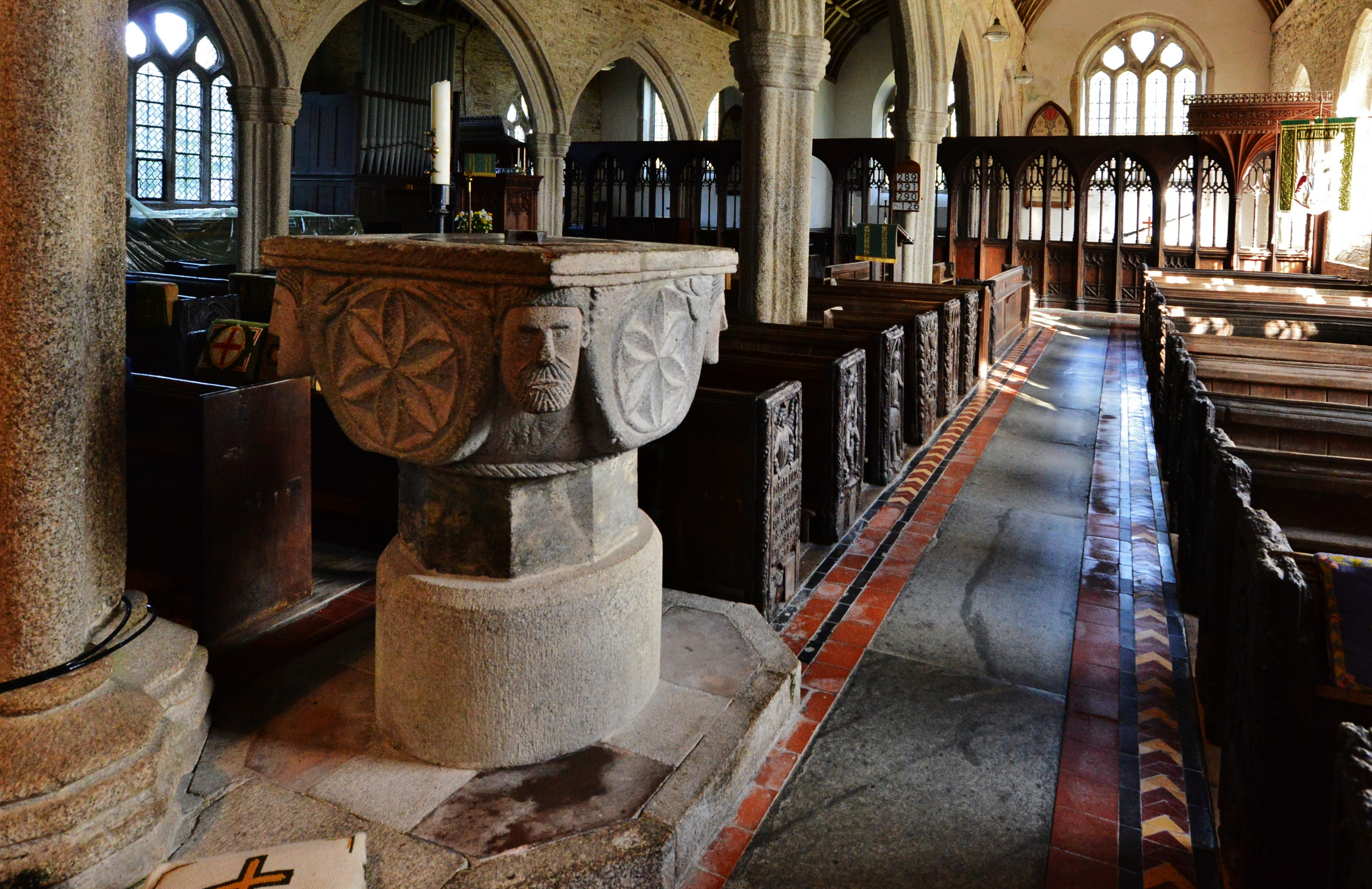

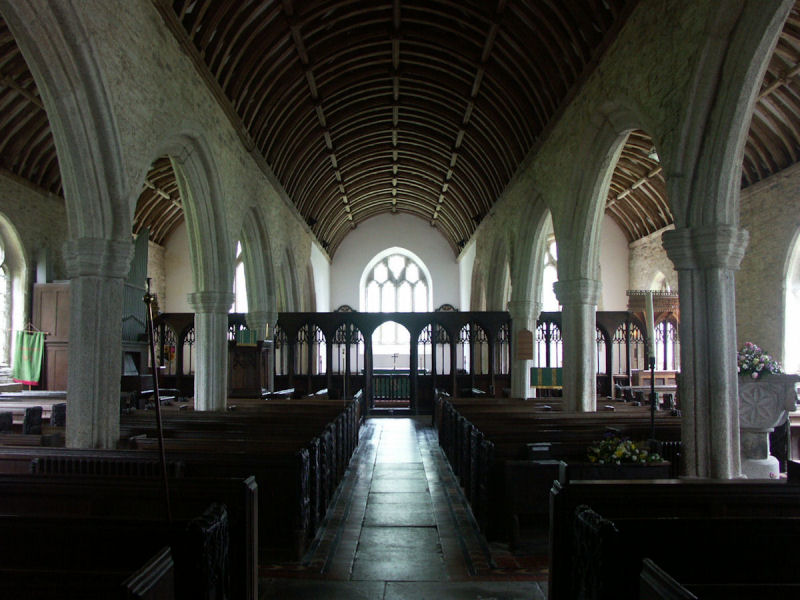

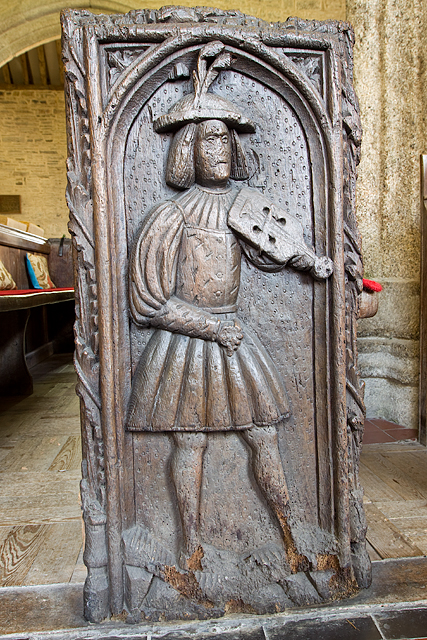

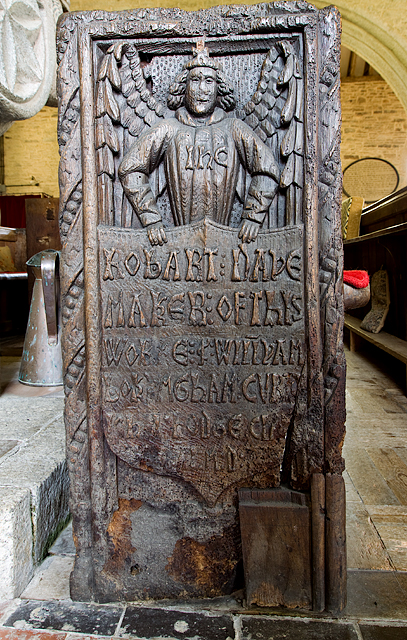

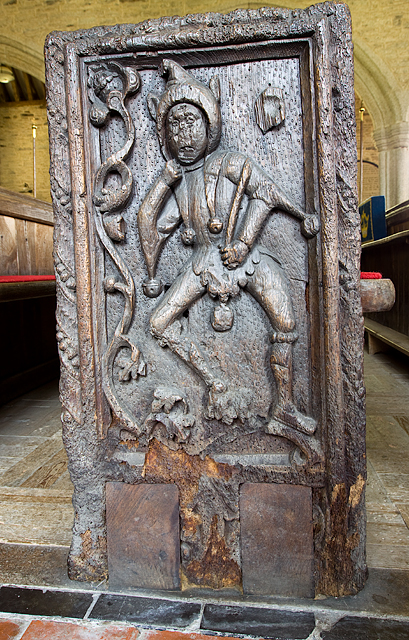

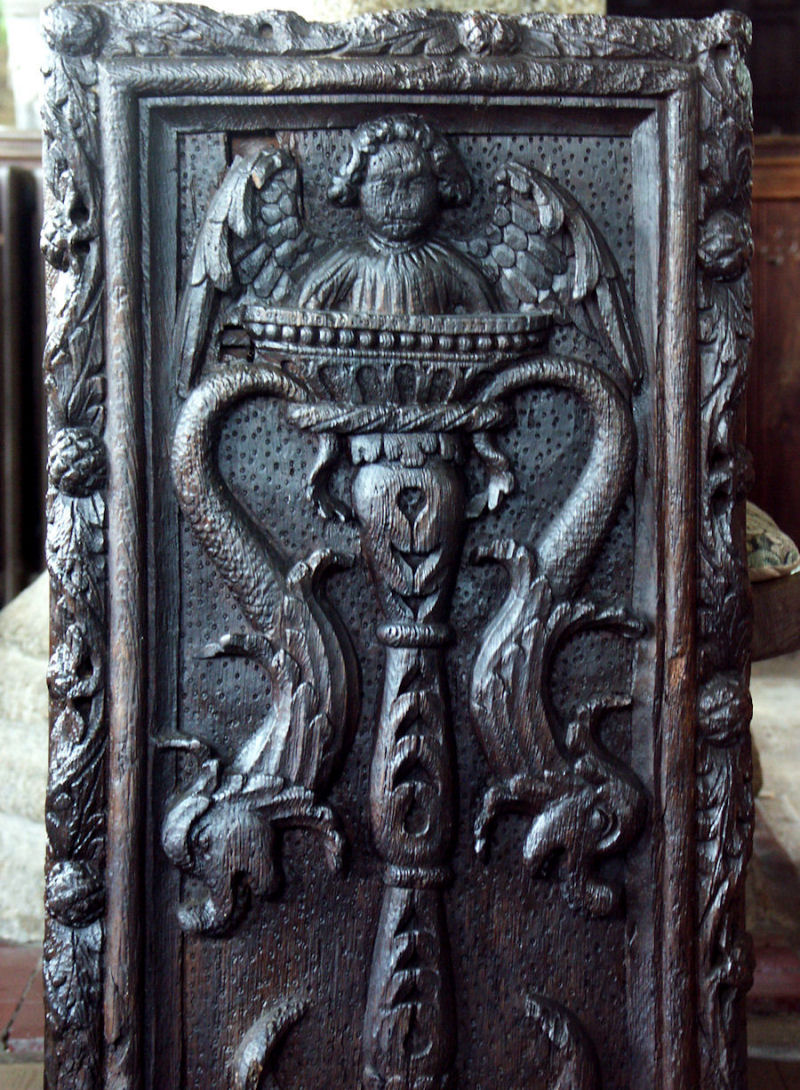

== External features ==
Associated with the church are five structures that are listed at Grade II. These are the northeast entrance to the churchyard, the northwest entrance, the gate, gatepiers, nearby wall and a mounting block at the southeast entrance, and two items in the church yard; the Isbell tomb, and a tombchest and headstone.
