= Saint Non =

Welsh saint; mother of St David

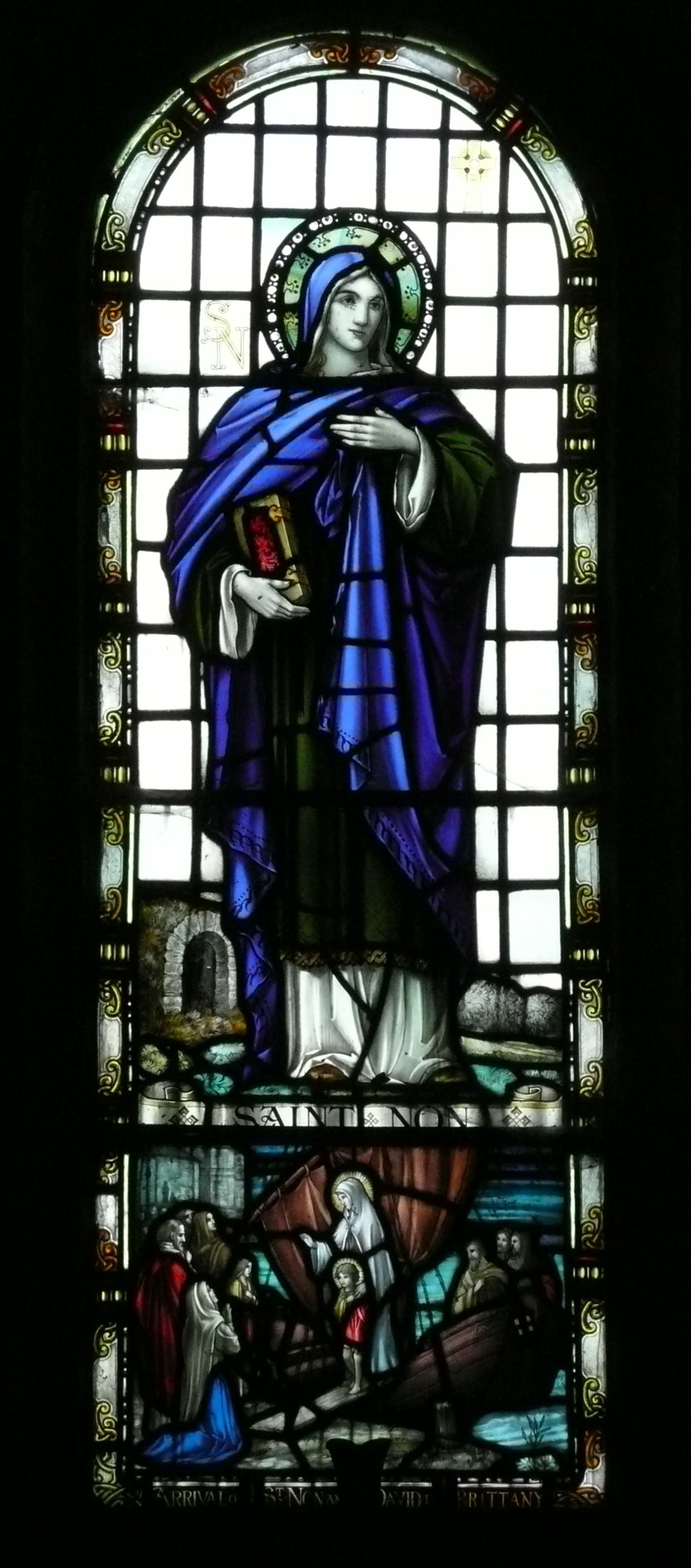
- St Non portrayed in stained glass in St Non's Chapel
- Born: 5th century AD probably Pembrokeshire
- Died: 6th century AD; Brittany or Cornwall
- Venerated in: Eastern Orthodox Church; Anglican Communion; Roman Catholic Church
- Major shrine: Dirinon, Finistère
- Feast: 2, 3 or 5 March, or second Sunday after Midsummer's Day
- Patronage: raped women Pelynt

Non (also Nonna or Nonnita) was, according to Christian tradition, the mother of Saint David, the patron saint of Wales.

== Legend ==
The Life of St David was written around 1095 by Rhigyfarch, and is our main source of knowledge for the lives of both St David (died c. 589) and his mother. Rhigyfarch was a Norman cleric whose father had been Bishop of St David's for 10 years. He states that she was a nun at Ty Gwyn ("the white house") near Whitesands Bay (Pembrokeshire), (although she may have become a nun later as a widow).

Tradition holds that Nonita was raped and that the product of that rape was David – she was "unhappily seized and exposed to the sacrilegious violence of one of the princes of the country". Rhigyfarch recounts the tradition that the rapist was Sanctus, King of Ceredigion, who came upon Non while travelling through Dyfed (in South Wales). After conceiving, Nonita, who remained celibate both before and afterwards, lived on bread and water alone. When a preacher found himself unable to preach in the presence of her unborn child, this was taken as a sign that the child would himself be a great preacher. A local ruler (possibly Vortiporius) learned of this pregnancy and feared the power of the child to be born. He plotted to kill him upon birth, but on the day of her labour a great storm made it impossible for anyone to travel outdoors. Only the place where Nonita groaned with birth-pangs was bathed in light. The pain was said to have been so intense that her fingers left marks as she grasped a rock and the stone itself split asunder in sympathy with her. A church was built in the place of David's birth and this stone is now concealed in the foundations of the altar.

Variations on her story state that:

- Non may have been the daughter of the nobleman Cynyr of Caer Goch (in Pembrokeshire).
- The chieftain who fathered David may have been named Xantus, Sandde or Sant. (Rees points out that names meaning 'Holy' and 'Nun' might be seen as fitting for the parents of a great saint.)
- Non may have been married to Sant before David's birth or after the birth of the saint.
- She brought the boy up at Henfeynyw near Aberaeron and founded a convent nearby at what is now called Llanon (the village being named after her).
- Subsequently, Non may have travelled to Cornwall and ultimately ended her days in a Breton convent.
- In some sources, Non is commemorated as a male companion of David.

== Veneration ==
The place where Non gave birth to Saint David is now named Capel Non, and is marked by the Chapel of St Non. Close to the ruins of this chapel is her holy well; nearby also stands a retreat house, and a chapel dedicated to Our Lady and Saint Non built in 1934. The ruins are easily accessible from the Pembrokeshire Coastal Path. Other churches bear her name in Devon, Ceredigion and Carmarthenshire.

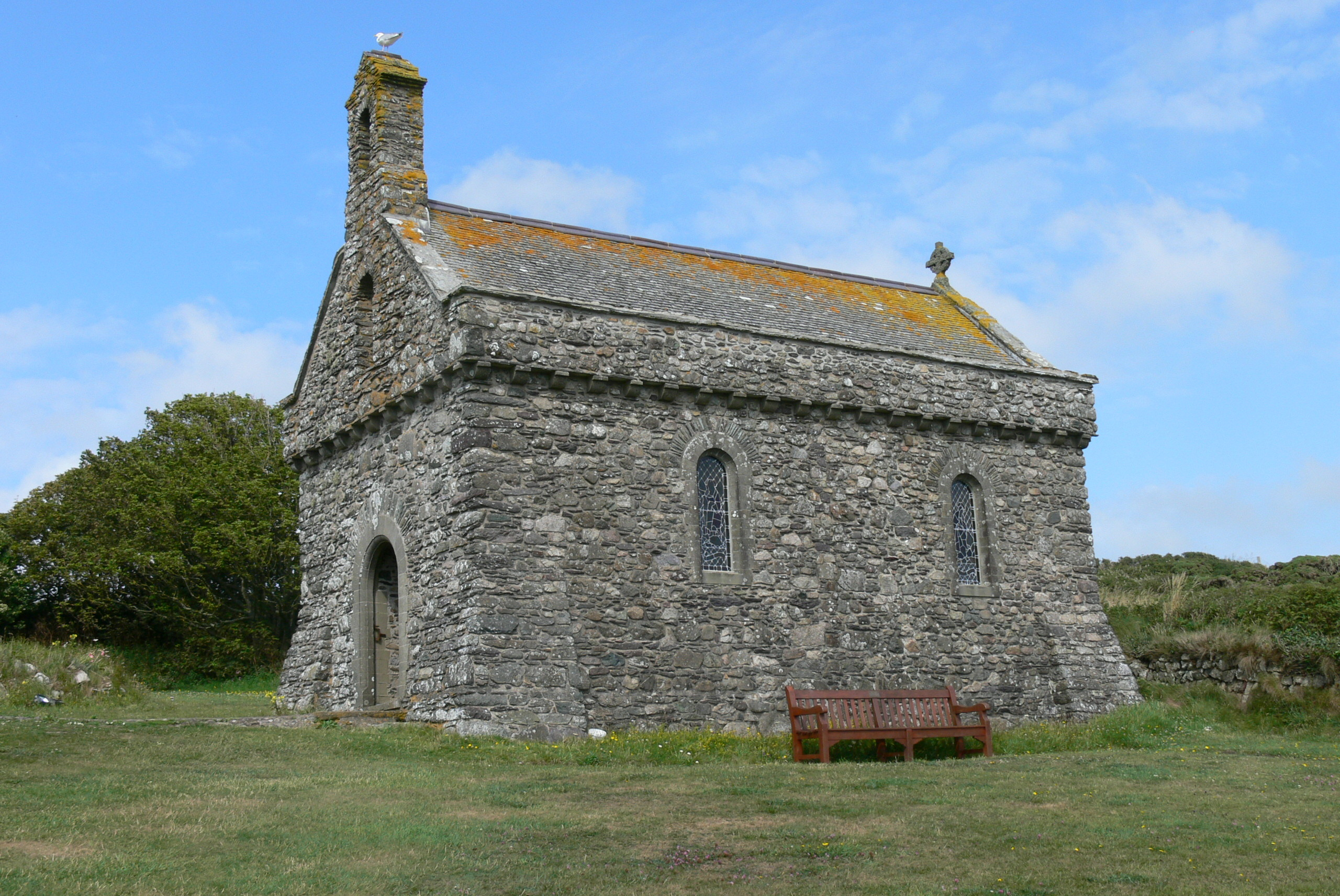
Chapel of Our Lady and Saint Non, Pembrokeshire, built 1934.

Non's relics were initially venerated at Altarnun in Cornwall. However, these were destroyed during the Reformation. Medieval glass fragments which remain above the altar may depict Non; there is a holy well nearby with a long tradition of bringing the insane to be immersed (one legend has them being thrown in backwards) in hope of a cure. She is also the patron of Pelynt in Cornwall where there is St Nonna's Holy Well.

Non died at Dirinon, Brittany, ten miles east of Brest, and is buried there; her shrine can still be seen in Dirinon's parish church. An alternative legend puts her being martyred at the hands of druids at Bradstone in Devon where the church is dedicated to her.

St Non's feast day is given as 2 March by Mullins and by the 18th century text of Browne Willis cited by Rees. Nash Ford identifies 3 March as her date of death. 3 March is also the date recognised by Simpson. She is listed under 5 March in the 1995 revision of the Church in Wales calendar. At the Parish of Pelynt, which contains St Nonna's Holy Well, the feast of St Nonna is celebrated on the second Sunday after Midsummer's Day.

St Non is not officially commemorated in the current liturgy of the Roman Catholic Church: she does not appear in the 2004 edition of the Roman Martyrology, nor the Roman Catholic calendar for Wales.

== See also ==
- Chapel of St Non
- St Non church of Llanerch Aeron parish, near Aberaeron
- St Nonna's Church, Altarnun
- St Nonna's Church, Bradstone, Devon
- fr:Église Sainte-Nonne de Dirinon
