= Nona, Missouri =

- Unincorporated community
- Location within Missouri
- Coordinates: 38°33′58″N 90°56′26″W
- Country: United States
- State: Missouri
- County: St. Charles
- Elevation: 479 ft (146 m)
- Time zone: UTC-6 (Central (CST))
  - Summer (DST): UTC-5 (CDT)
- Area code: 636
- GNIS feature ID: 756447

Nona is an unincorporated community in St. Charles County, Missouri, United States. Nona is located approximately 1 mile (1.6 km) west of Augusta on Augusta Bottom Road and the Katy Trail.

The namesake of Nona is unknown.
