= Nona Rutland =

American horsewoman

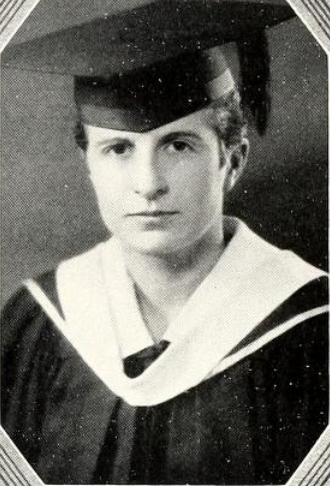
- Rutland, from the 1928 yearbook of Randolph-Macon Woman's College
- Born: Eleanora Wills Rutland; March 14, 1907; Nashville, Tennessee, U.S.
- Died: February 11, 1980 (aged 72); New Orleans, Louisiana, U.S.
- Occupations: Horsewoman, equestrian educator, camp director

Eleanora "Nona" Rutland (March 14, 1907 – February 1980) was an American horsewoman and equestrian educator. She was co-director of the riding program at Camp Riva-Lake, a girls' summer camp in Winchester, Tennessee, and director of Audubon Park Stables in New Orleans.

Rutland competed in horse shows as a child and a teen, and continued in the equestrian field through her life, as a rider, owner, trainer, and judge. She was described as "one of this country's foremost authorities on three and five gaited horsemanship" in a 1977 feature.

== Early life and education ==
Rutland was born in Nashville, Tennessee, the daughter of William Patton Rutland Jr. and Eleanora Wills Rutland. Her maternal grandfather was Andrew Woods Wills, Nashville postmaster and a Union Army quartermaster during the American Civil War. She attended Nashville's Peabody College for two years, and graduated from Randolph-Macon Woman's College in 1928.

== Career ==
Rutland taught riding at the Gulf Hills Club in Mississippi and at the Forest Hills Club in Tampa, Florida, as a young woman. In 1934, Rutland became director of Audubon Stables in New Orleans. Mary Belle "Kit" Pillow joined the Audubon staff as Rutland's assistant in 1940. The riders they trained included diplomat Anne Legendre Armstrong and socialite Joan Robinson Hill.

Rutland was a licensed judge for the American Horse Shows Association, and served on the organization's board of directors. She was also the equitation editor of Bridle and Saddle, a national publication in the field.

During summers, Rutland and Pillow ran the riding school at Camp Riva-Lake in Winchester, Tennessee, "one of the best known girls' camps in the South". Rutland's mother was the camp's founder and director from 1922 to 1952.

== Publications ==
- A Standard for Three and Five-Gaited Horsemanship (1952, with Annie Lawson Cowgill and Helen Crabtree)

== Personal life ==
Rutland and Pillow lived together in a house on the grounds of Audubon Stables. Rutland died in 1980, at the age of 72, in New Orleans. Camp Riva-Lake still offers summer horesback riding sessions for its girl campers.
