= Ploudiry Parish close =

- Eglise Saint-Pierre
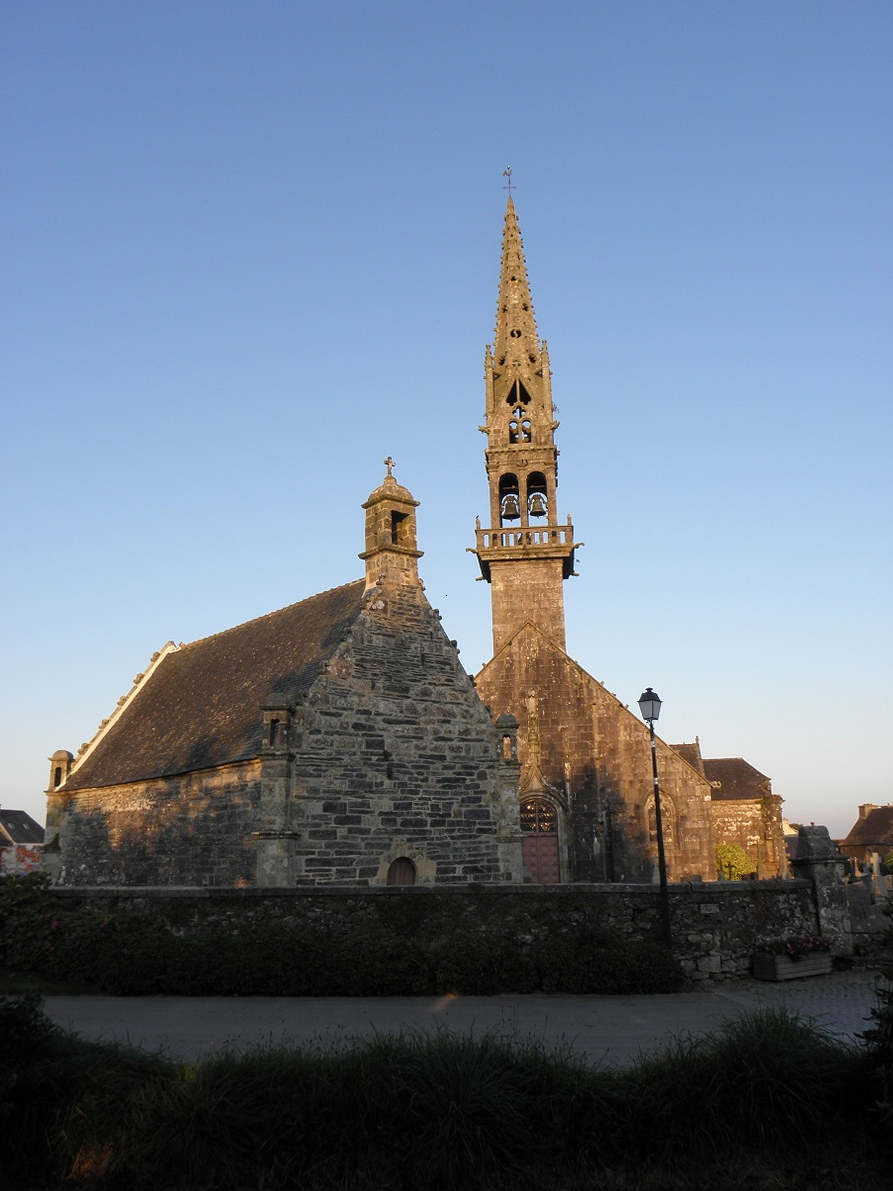
- The ossuary and parish church.
- Ploudiry Parish close
- 48.4529°N 4.1423°W
- Location: Ploudiry, Brest arrondisissement, Brittany

Architecture
- Style: Neo-Gothic
- Years built: c. 1633 - c. 1665; 1700 - 1713; 1853 - 1856
- Groundbreaking: c. 1633
- Completed: 1856

Monument historique
- Official name: Eglise Saint-Pierre
- Type: Ensemble cultuel
- Designated: 1916
- Reference no.: PA00090213

The Ploudiry Parish close is an enclos paroissial located at Ploudiry within the arrondissement of Brest, Brittany. It comprises a church, ossuary, and calvary. The Parish close was built between the 1630s and 1650s, with major renovations taking place in the 18th and 19th centuries.

== History ==
The earliest structures within the Parish close date to the 1630s. Much of the old church was demolished and replaced in the 18th century, and from 1853 to 1856, a major part of the church was rebuilt according to the designs of architect Joseph Bigot.

Until the French Revolution, the parish of Ploudiry was the largest in the region of Léon and served Loc-Eguiner, Ploudiry, La Martyre, La Roche-Maurice and Saint Julien d'Landerneau. It was one of the areas in the Élorn valley to be enriched by participation in the linen trade and much of this wealth was invested within the church building. It was listed as a historical monument in 1916.

== Eglise Saint-Pierre ==
The main building within the Ploudiry Parish close is the Eglise Saint-Pierre. It has been renovated multiple times since being built, with much of the existing structure dated to the 18th and 19th centuries. The largest surviving feature of the original church is the south porch.

=== Bell tower ===
In 1850, the original bell tower collapsed, destroying the church roof. The tower was rebuilt in 1854, however, due to a lack of funds the new tower is much smaller than the original. The tower features one gallery.

=== South porch ===
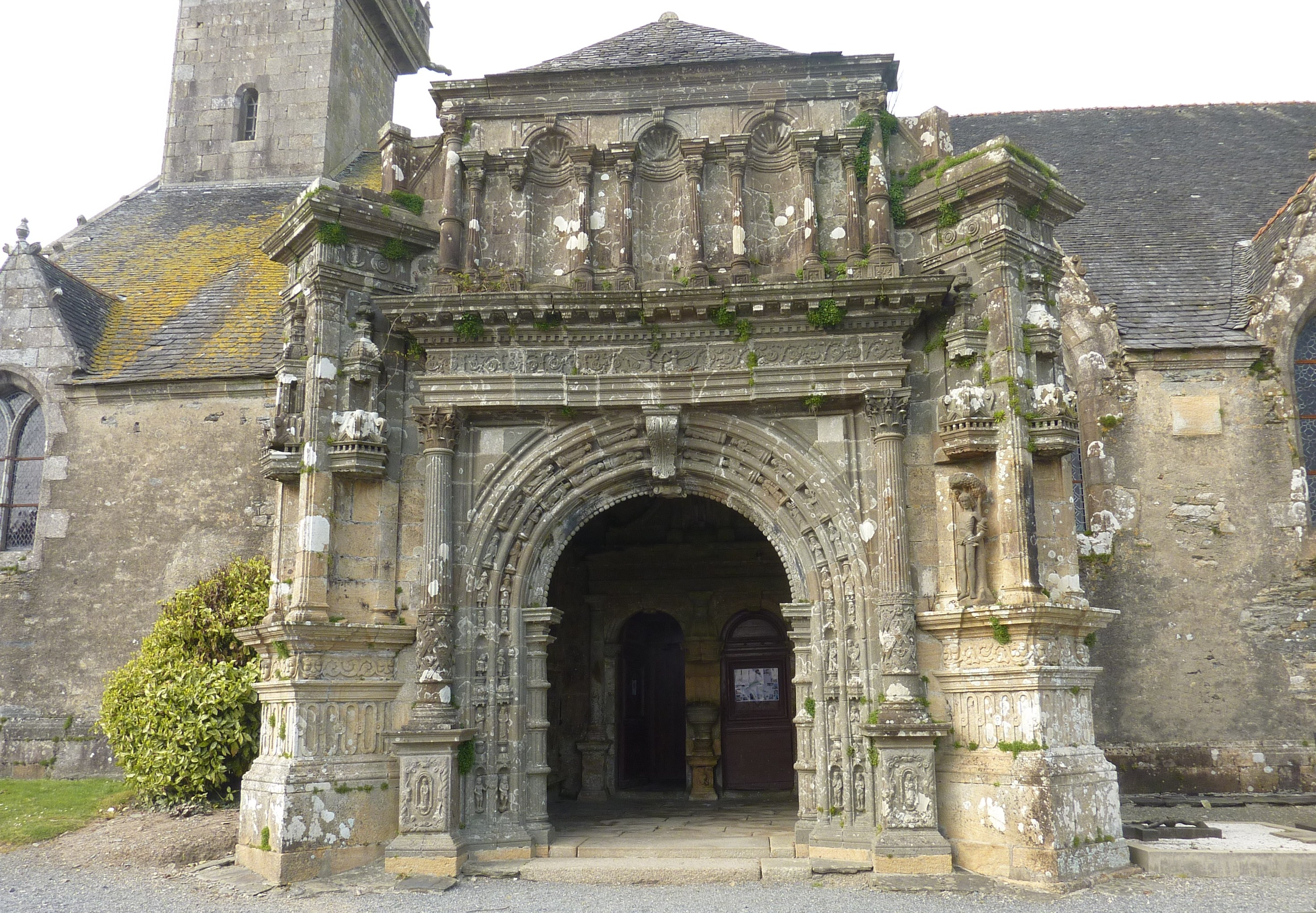
The south porch. Three empty niches are at the top. Arcaded entrance with pillars are on either side and the piédroits and voussures are around the arch. The statue of Saint Sebastian is on the right.

The south porch was built in 1665 in the Renaissance style using a mixture of yellow Logonna stone and Kersanton. The entrance arcade mountings and voussoirs are decorated with figures from the Old Testament and the Passion of Jesus Christ, including prophets and church teachers. There is a Kersanton statue of Saint Sebastian in a niche on the right side buttress.

At the base of the arcade and in the individual bricks of the pillars supporting the arch (piédroits) are six scenes inspired by the book of Genesis and the story of Adam and Eve. In the first piédroit at the base of the left hand pillar, Adam and Eve are in Paradise, beneath the tree. The snake has a human head and a reptilian body, and it wraps itself around part of the piédroit. Eve is reaching toward the forbidden fruit. The opposite piédroit at the base of the right-hand pillar shows Eve failing to resist the temptation. Adam and Eve are expelled from Eden, and have covered their pubic areas with a flower and their free arms cover their chests. Above Eve, an angel shakes its fist in anger.

In the second piédroit on the left, Eve is shown as a mother holding a baby. Adam works in the field while Cain and Abel make sacrifices. On the far right side, Cain is shielding his eye while his brother kneels in prayer.

The third piédroit on the left shows Abel in his death throes while his brother, full of regret, turns toward a depiction of an unhappy God. The final piédroit, third on the right, depicts Noah harvesting grapes and then, while intoxicated, Cham tries to cover his father by drawing together his cloak. Either Shem or Japhet struggle to hold Cham back. There is a sort of sculptural full stop between the final piédroits and voussoires.

In the voussoires leading to the keystone, there are depictions of twelve people. First are four prophets: Daniel, Jeremiah, Isiah and Ezekiel. Next, there are four Eastern doctors: Jean Crysostome, Grégoire de Naziance, Athanase and Saint Basil. Finally, there are four Western doctors: Saint Augustine, Saint Jerome, Saint Gregory and Saint Ambrose. After the keystone, the voussoires depict twelve monks and nuns carrying the instruments of the passion. They hold one instrument in each hand: the whip and column of the flagellation, the cross and the nails, Malchus' ear on Saint Peter's knife and his lantern, the crown of thorns and roseau from the "Ecce Homo" scene, the bowl used by Pilate to wash his hands, the tools and the ladder used to bring Christ down from the cross, Veronica's veil, the lance of the transfiction and the hammer, and finally the sponge and Judas' thirty pieces of silver. The final two figures hold the long bars used to push the crown of thorns onto Christ's head. The porch interior contains twelve empty niches.

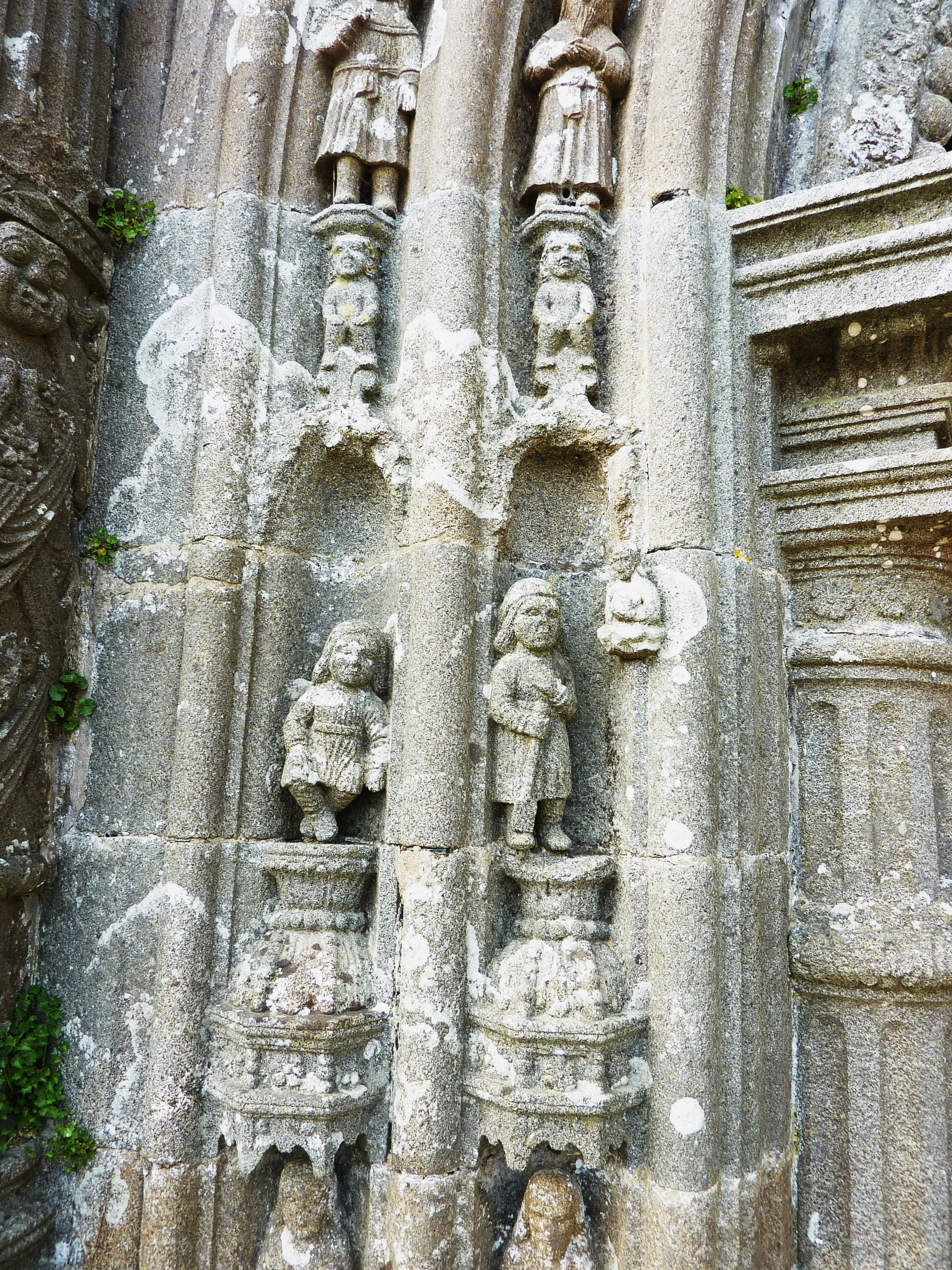
Piédroits on the left side of the entrance to the south porch at Ploudiry

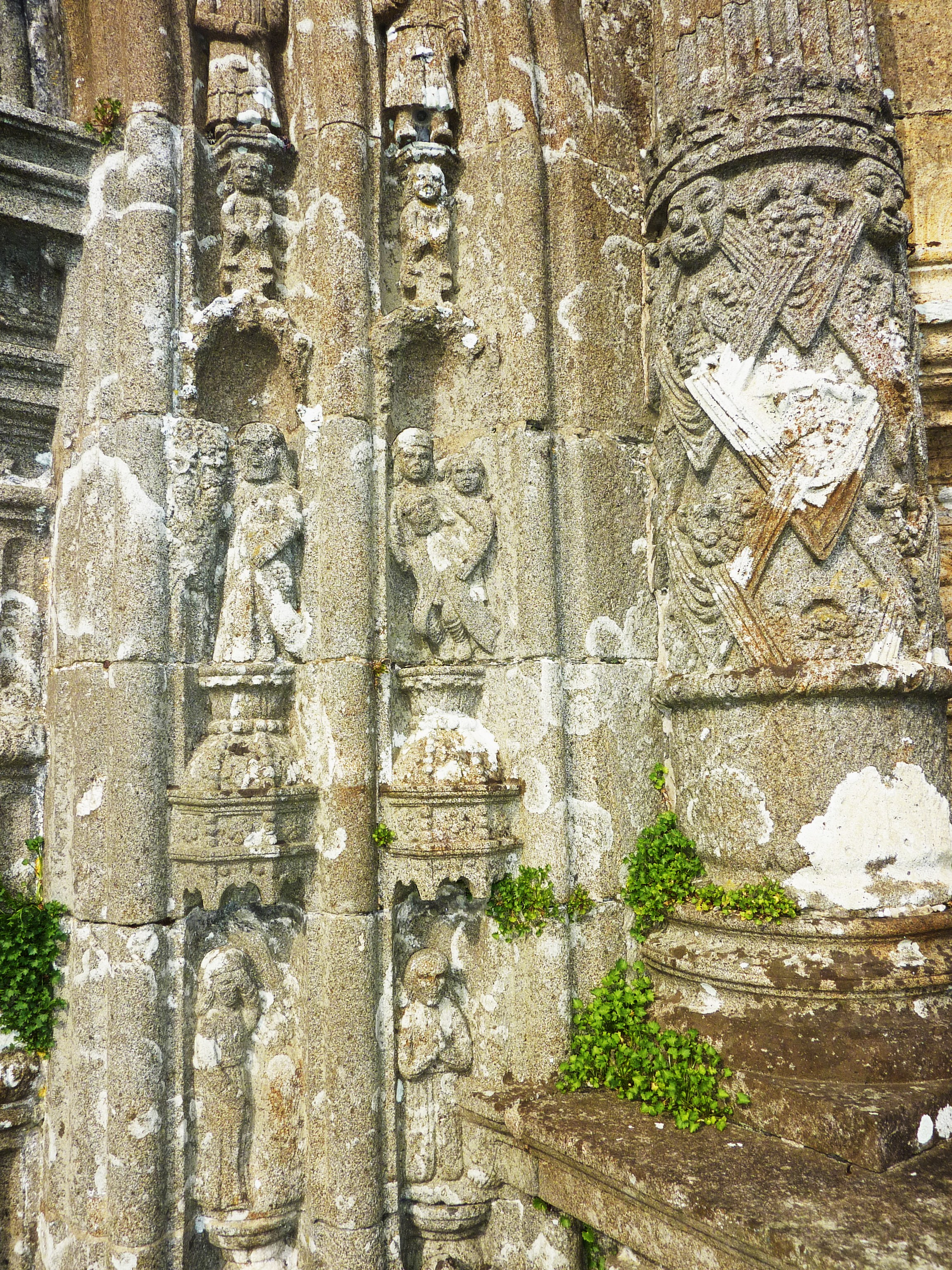
Piédroits on the right side of the entrance to the south porch at Ploudiry

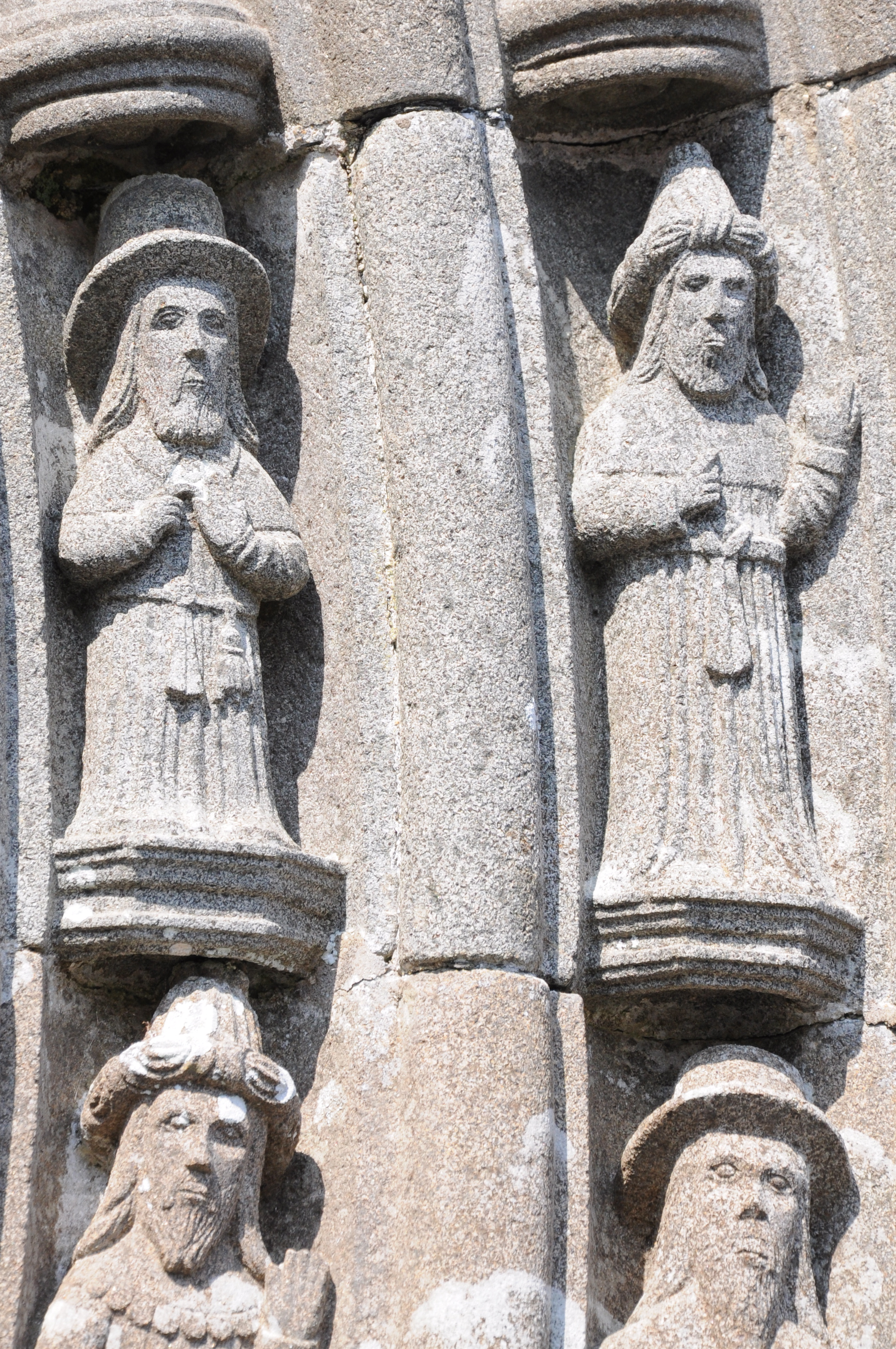
Sculptures in voussure of entrance to south porch: Daniel at right, Isaiah on left, with heads of Jeremiah and Ezekiel below .

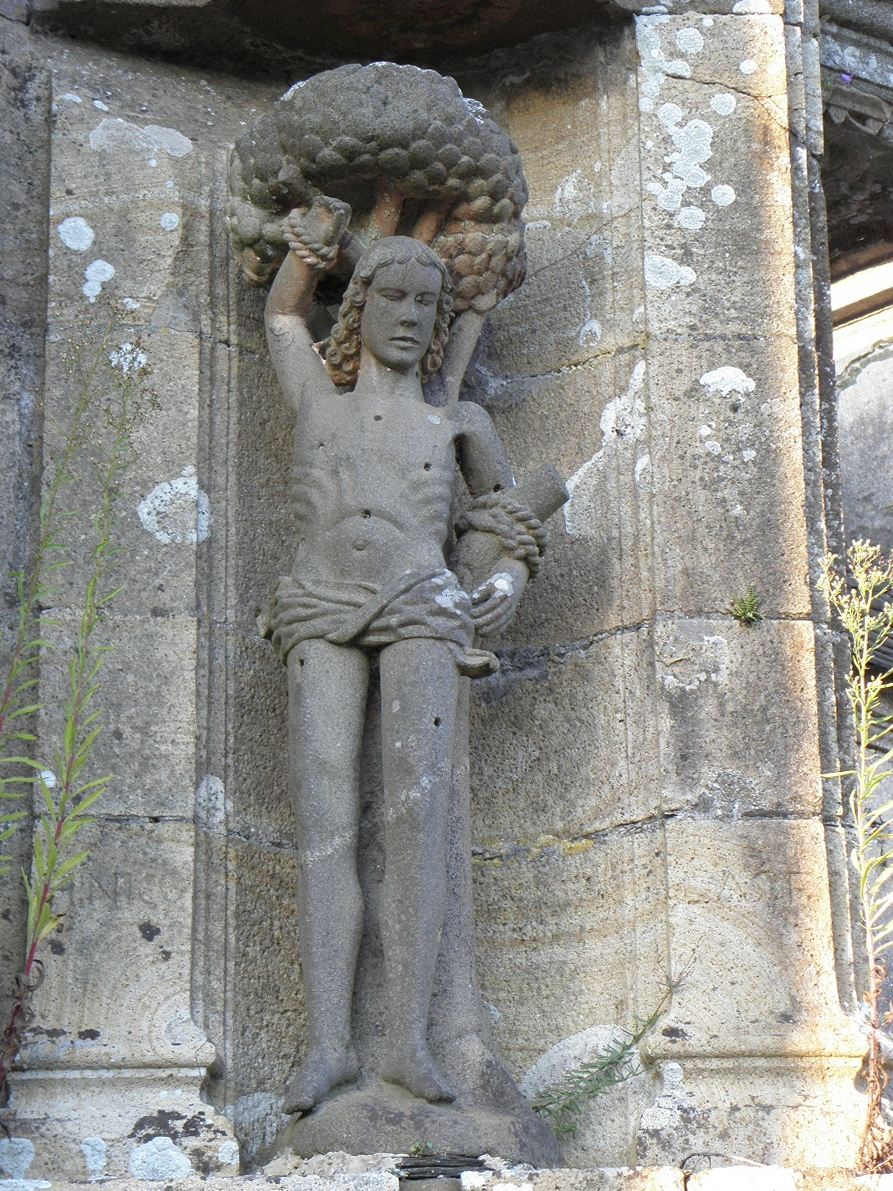
Saint Sebastian

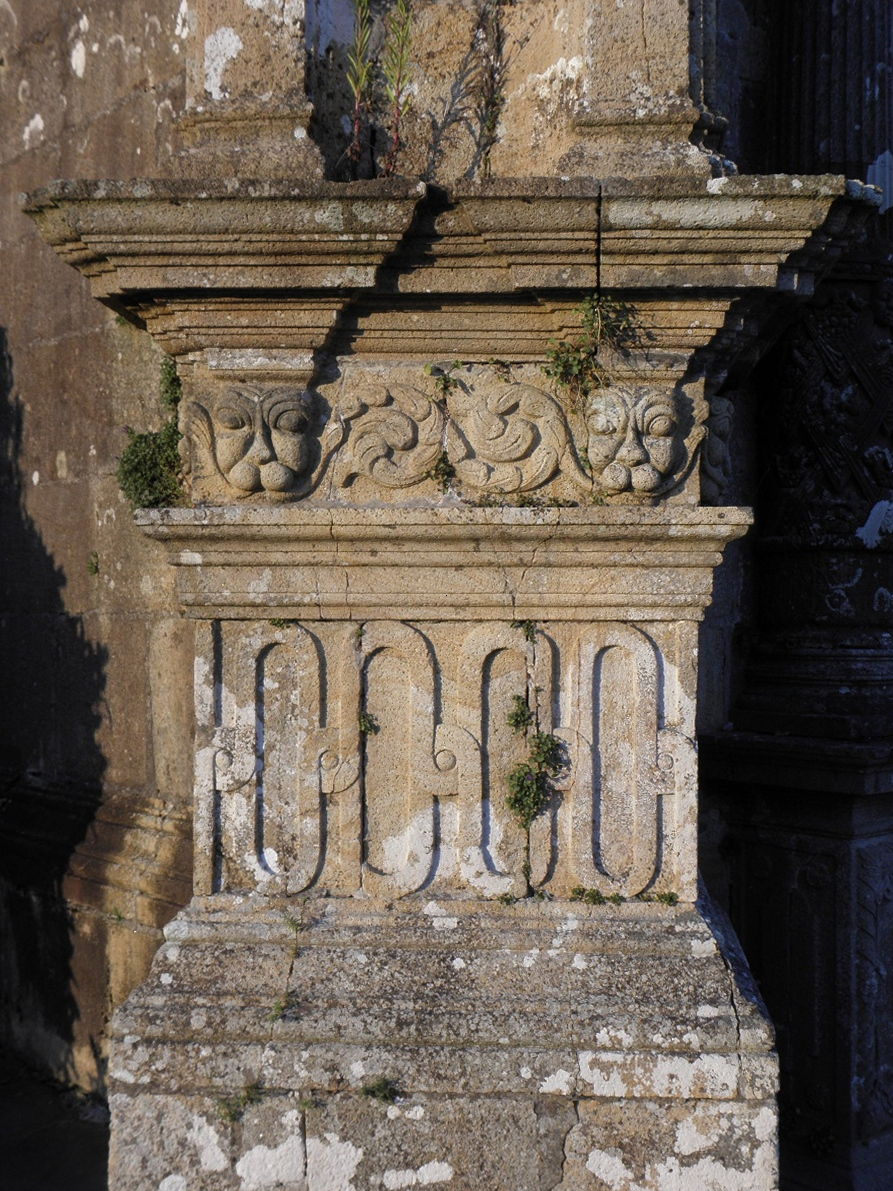
Decoration on the porch

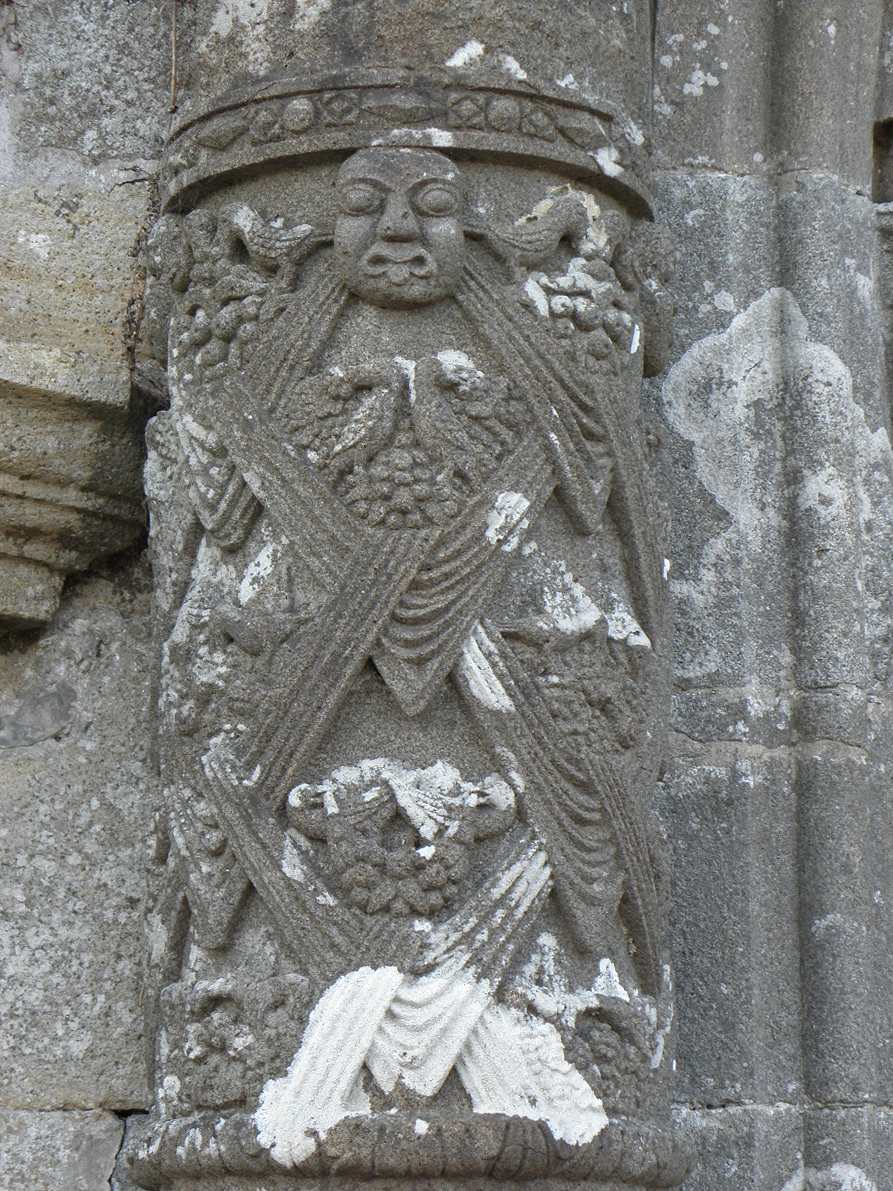
Decoration on the porch

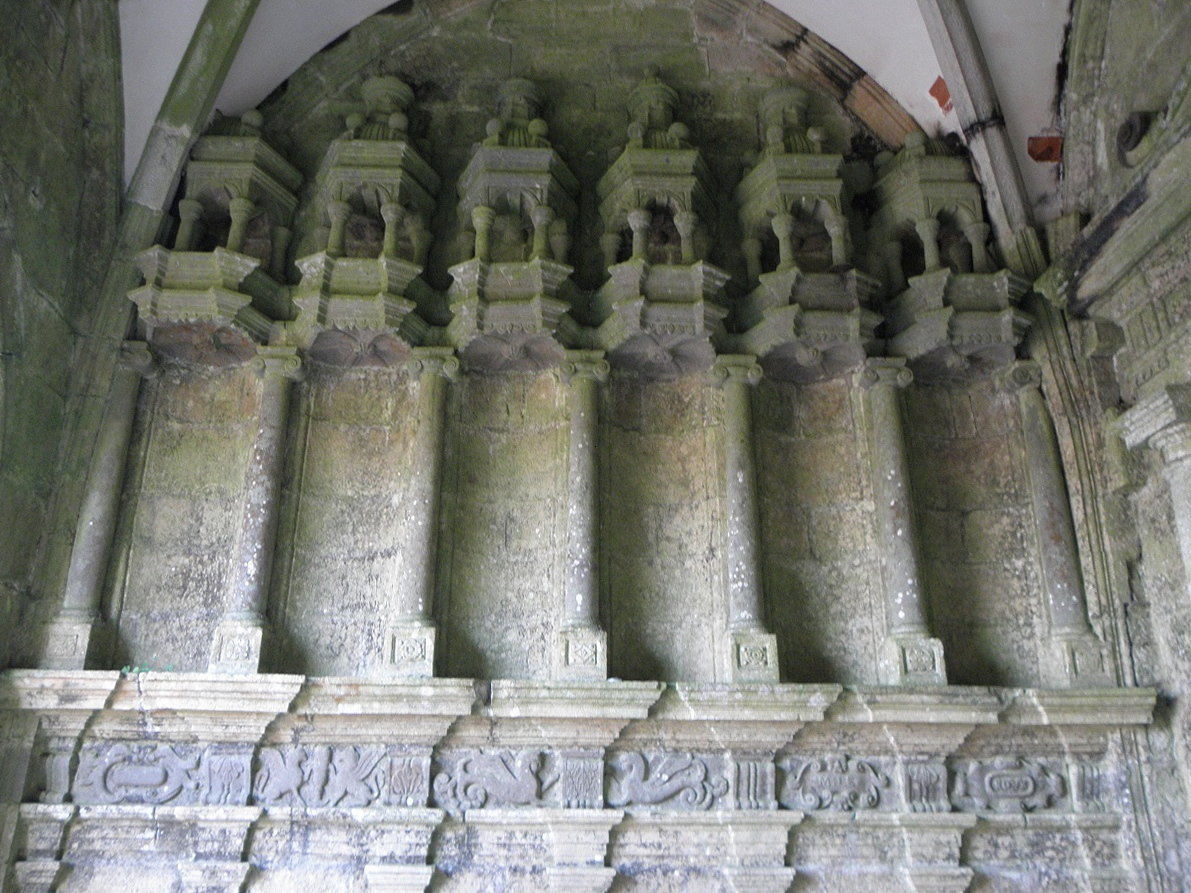
Empty niches in the porch interior

=== Main altar ===
The main altar comprises three panels: On the left, the Nativity of Jesus. In the centre, there are two shepherds. On the right, the Magi visit Christ. The tabernacle has niches containing depictions of the four Evangelists and its panels depict scenes from the life of the Holy Family and the Annunciation.

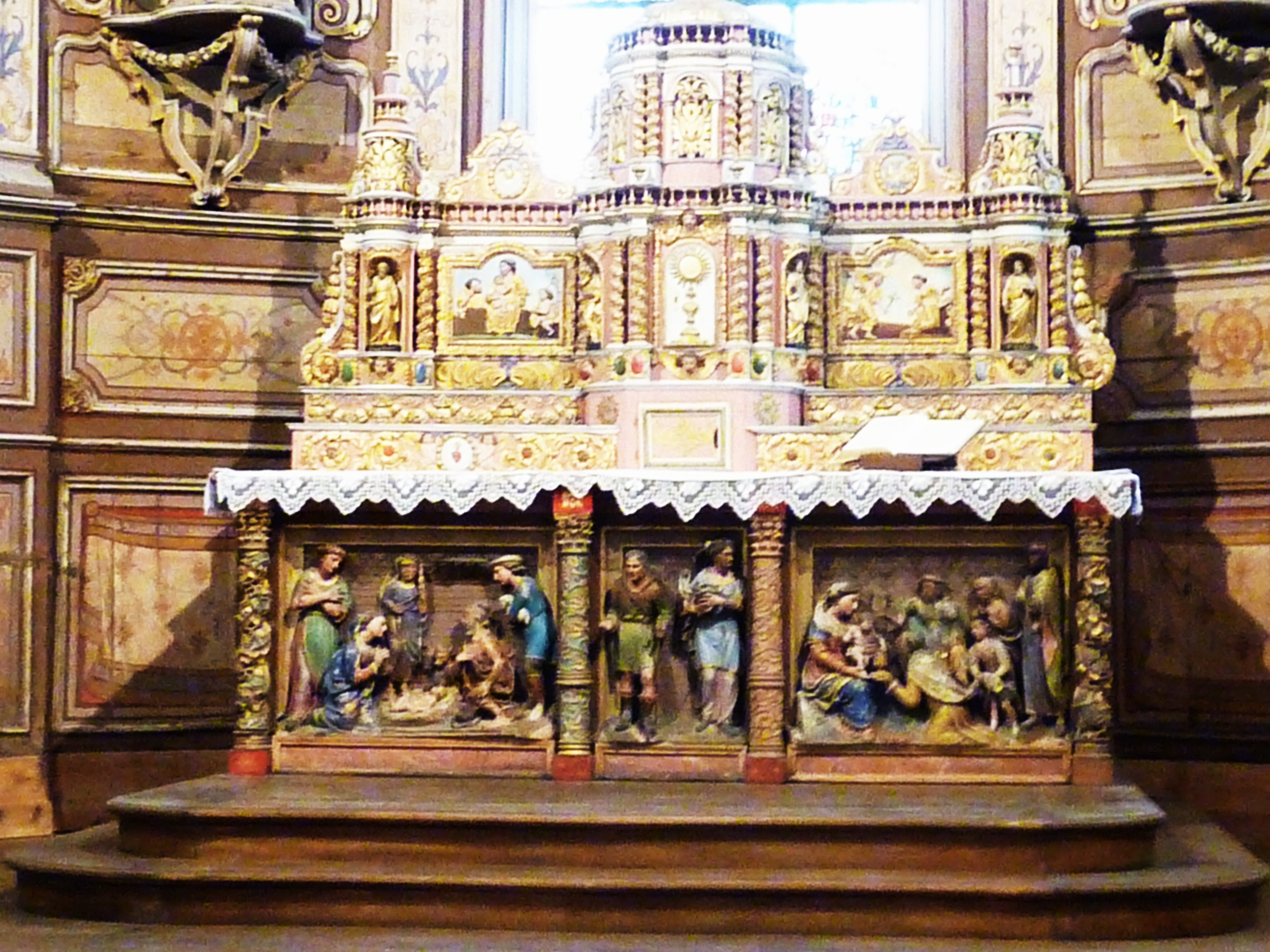
The main altar

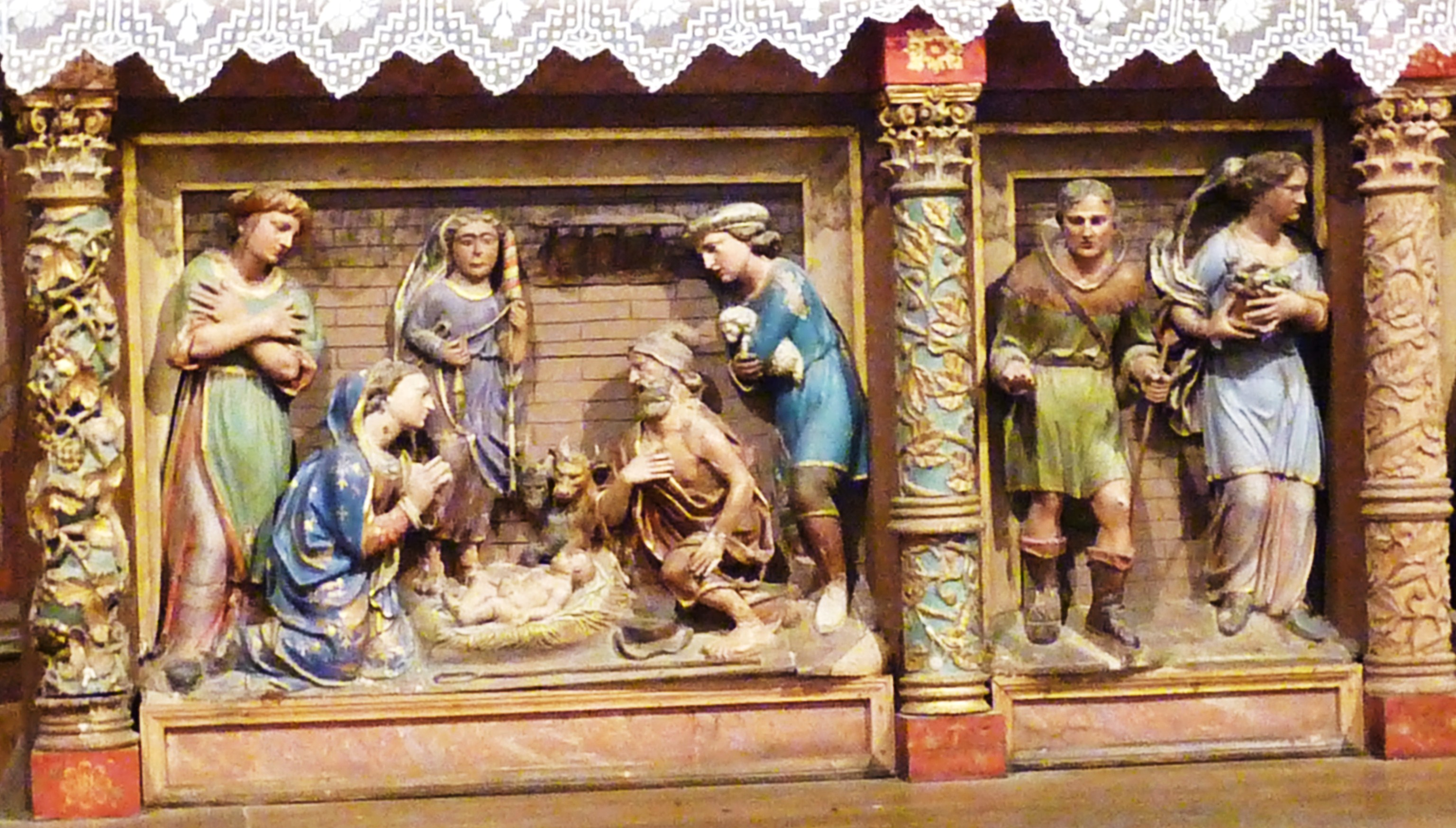
Part of main altar

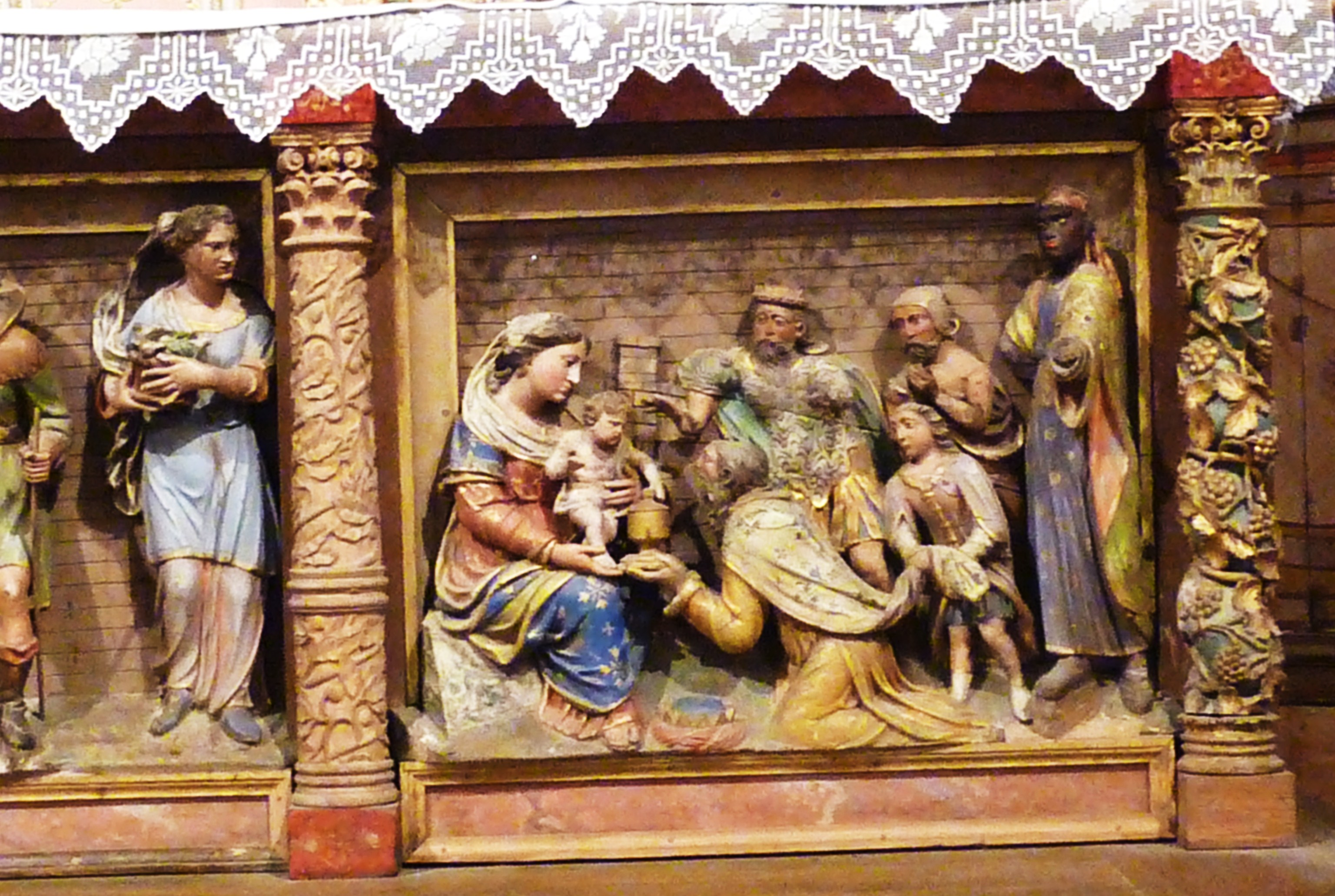
Part of main altar

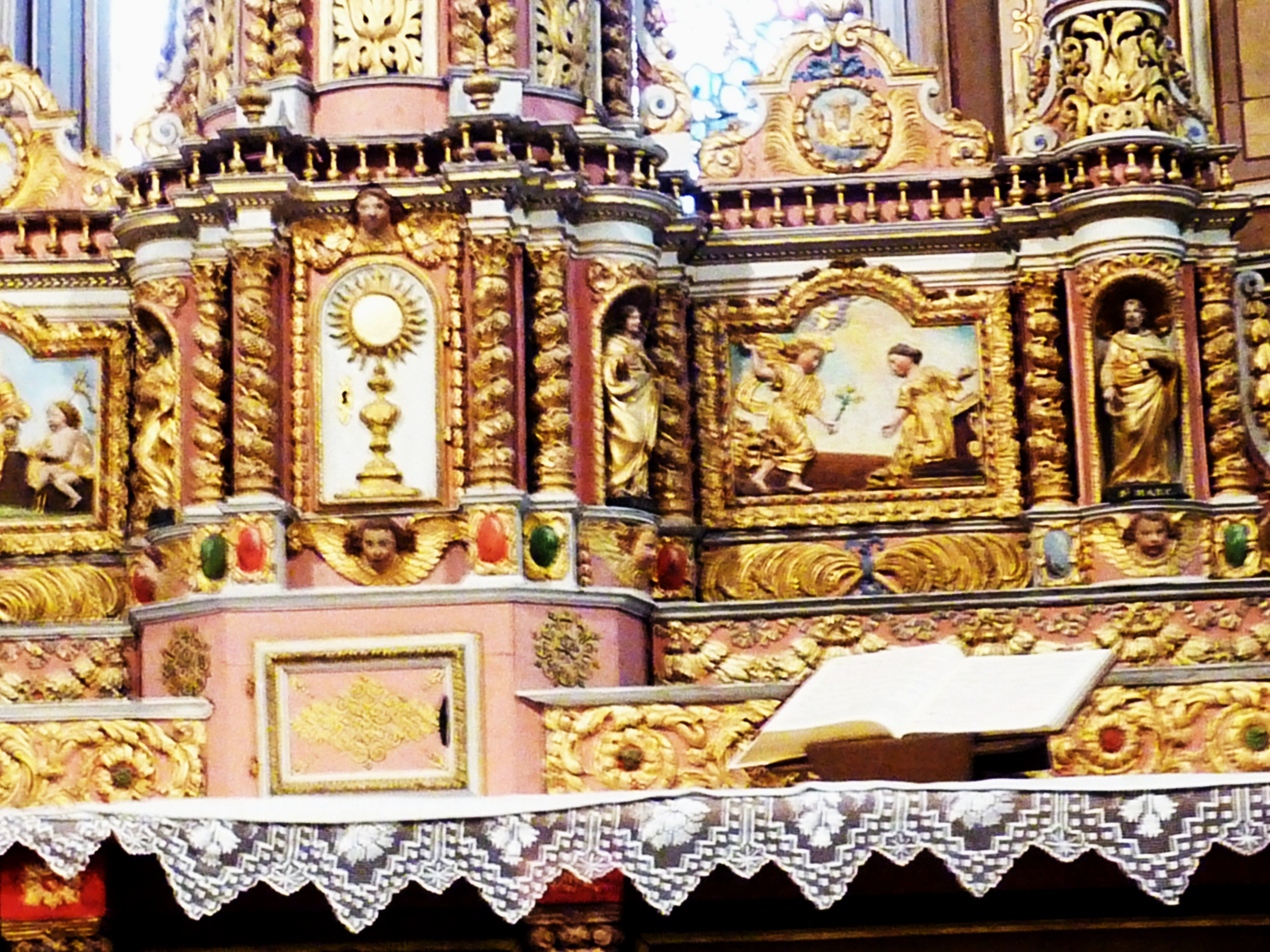
Part of main altar

=== The infant Jesus altarpiece ===
The infant Jesus altarpiece is located on the north side of the church. It was not originally part of the parish church, and came from the church at La Martyre in 1793. Six columns divide the altarpiece into three sections and niches hold statues of Saint Guillaume and Saint Francis of Assisi. Further niches above contain images of a female saint and an "Ecce Homo". At the front, Saint Anne is shown teaching the Virgin Mary to read and smaller niches hold images of Saint Peter and Saint Paul. The entire composition is crowned by a statue of the crowned Christ.

=== The Rosary altarpiece ===
This altarpiece was part of the original church, where it was located in the "Rosary" chapel (Chapelle du Rosaire). It dates to 1644. Side niches within the altarpiece contain statues of Saint Dominic and Catherine of Sienna, and the altarpiece painting shows saints receiving the rosary from the Virgin Mary and Jesus. Two panels under the altarpiece's niches depict Saint Peter and Saint Paul. Beneath the painting, a garland depicts the traditional fifteen medallions associated the mysteries of the rosary (five of joy, five of sadness and five of glory). Above the front of the altarpiece, there is a composition involving the Virgin Mary and her child. The stained glass in the abside depicts the passion and dates to the early 16th century.

=== Stained glass ===
The main window behind the altar is a remnant of the original church and depicts the crucifixion, with Christ on the cross and the two thieves on nearby crosses. Mary Magdalene is at the foot of the cross. Near the good thief, female saints, the disciples, and the soldier who would pierce Christ's side with a spear stand together. On the other side, the High Priest and various other figures stand together. The base of the window depicts scenes of Jesus in the Garden of Gethsemane, the Last Supper, and Jesus's arrest. On each side of the main window, there are statues of Saint Peter and the Virgin Mary with child. The two side windows are modern, dating to 1957 and signed "Guével". The left side window depicts scenes from Saint Peter's life and the right side window depicts scenes from the life of the Virgin Mary.

=== The pulpit ===
The pulpit has five panels, three of which are decorated with Bas reliefs. One Bas relief features Christ handing the keys of heaven to Saint Peter, the church's patron saint. The central relief features Christ in discussion with lawyers, and the final relief features Saint Peter alone. A sculpture of a dove is hung above the pulpit. At the top of the sounding board, there is a carving of the papal crown and Saint Peter's keys. Facing the pulpit is a statue of Christ on the cross and a pietà.

== The Ossuary ==
The ossuary is a rectangular chapel built in 1635 and restored in 1731. The door features a Greek style front with a tympanum containing a bust of Saint Peter. To the left of the door are five bays separated by doric pilasters. Above a frieze is a depiction of the danse macabre featuring a labourer, a noblewoman, a judge, and a warrior, all equal before a folk depiction of Death, the Ankou. Over the ossuary stoop, an angel carries a banner reading "Bones gente qui par icy passez/Priez Dieu les Trépassez 1635", a request to the passerby to respect the dead. A royal decree was passed in the early 18th century which effectively ended the use of ossuaries. Thereafter, many ossuaries were used as chapels or schools, and many are now small museums.

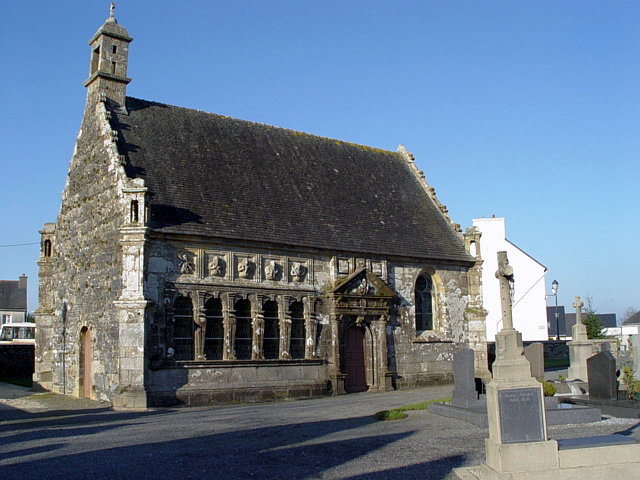
The Ploudiry ossuary

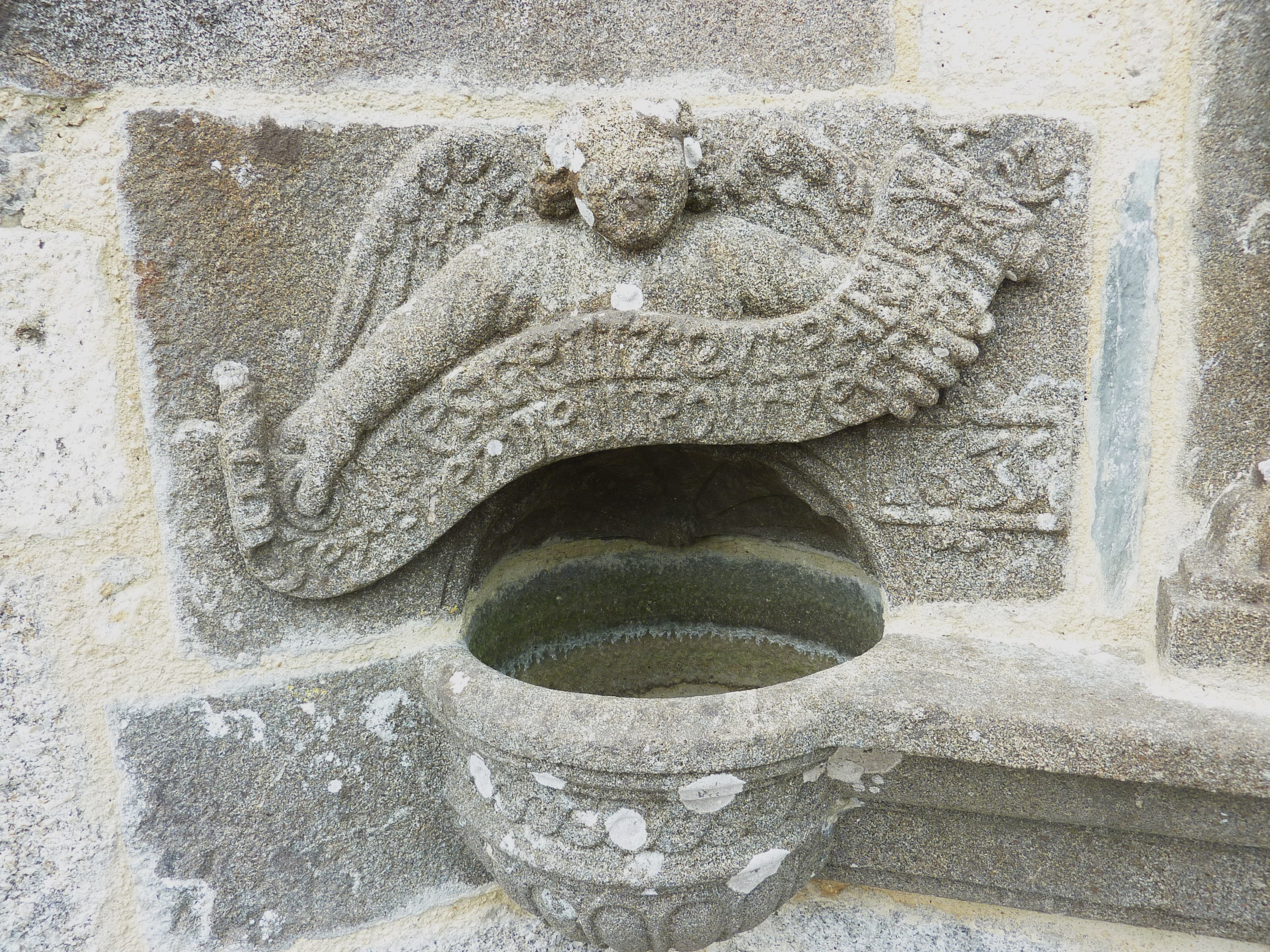
An angel with banner above the stoup

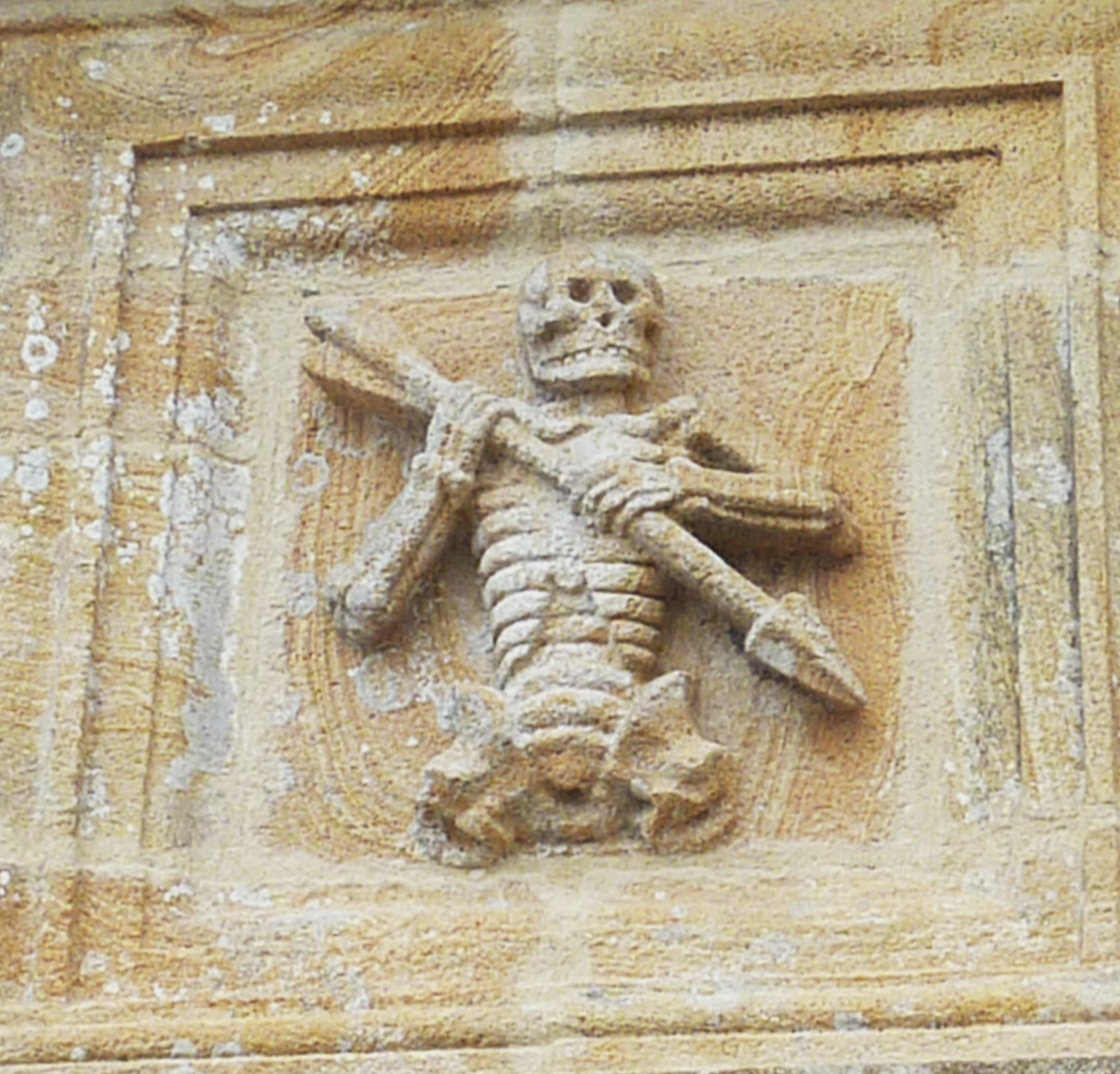
The Ankou

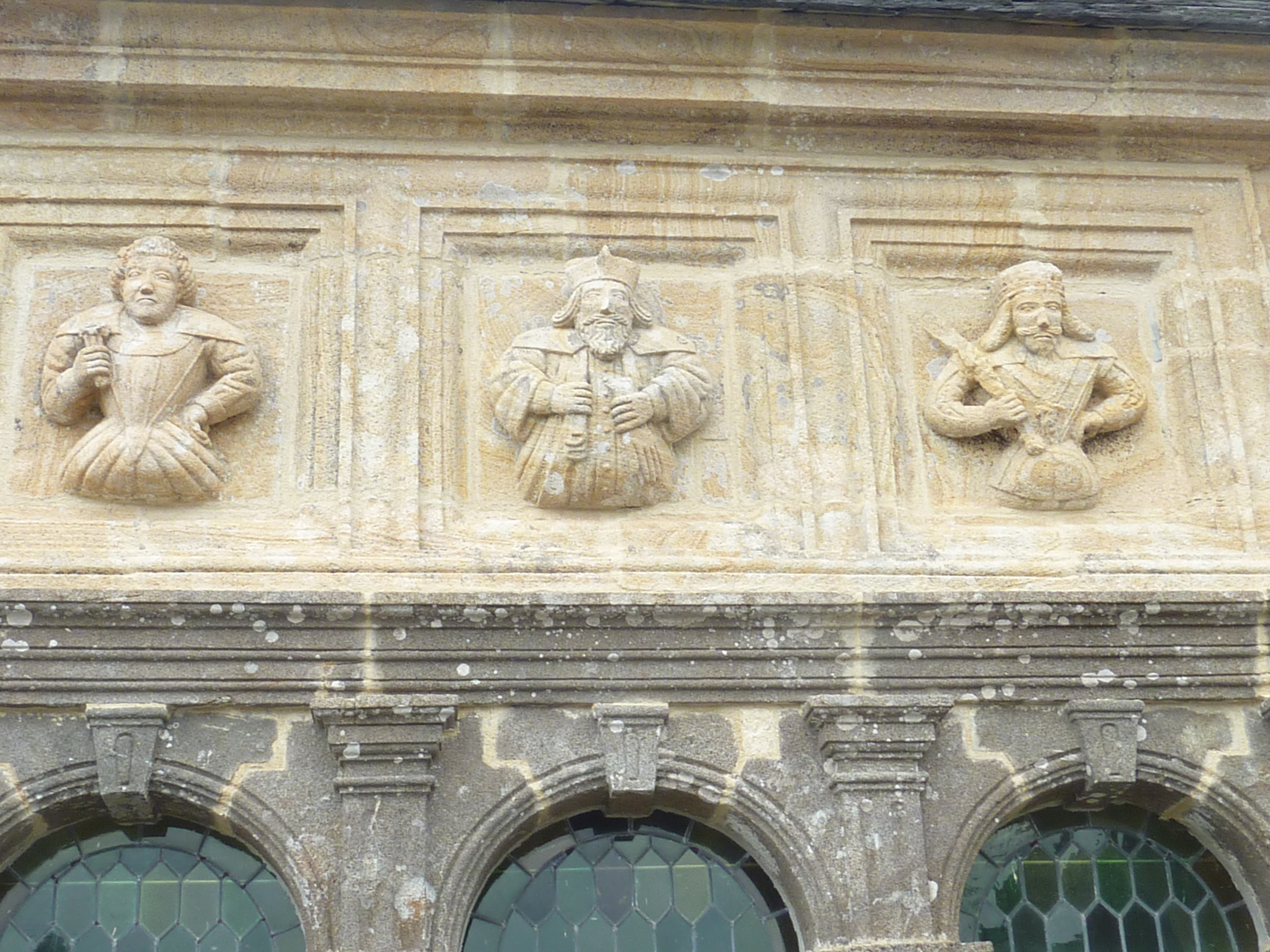
Other depictions in the ossuary frieze.

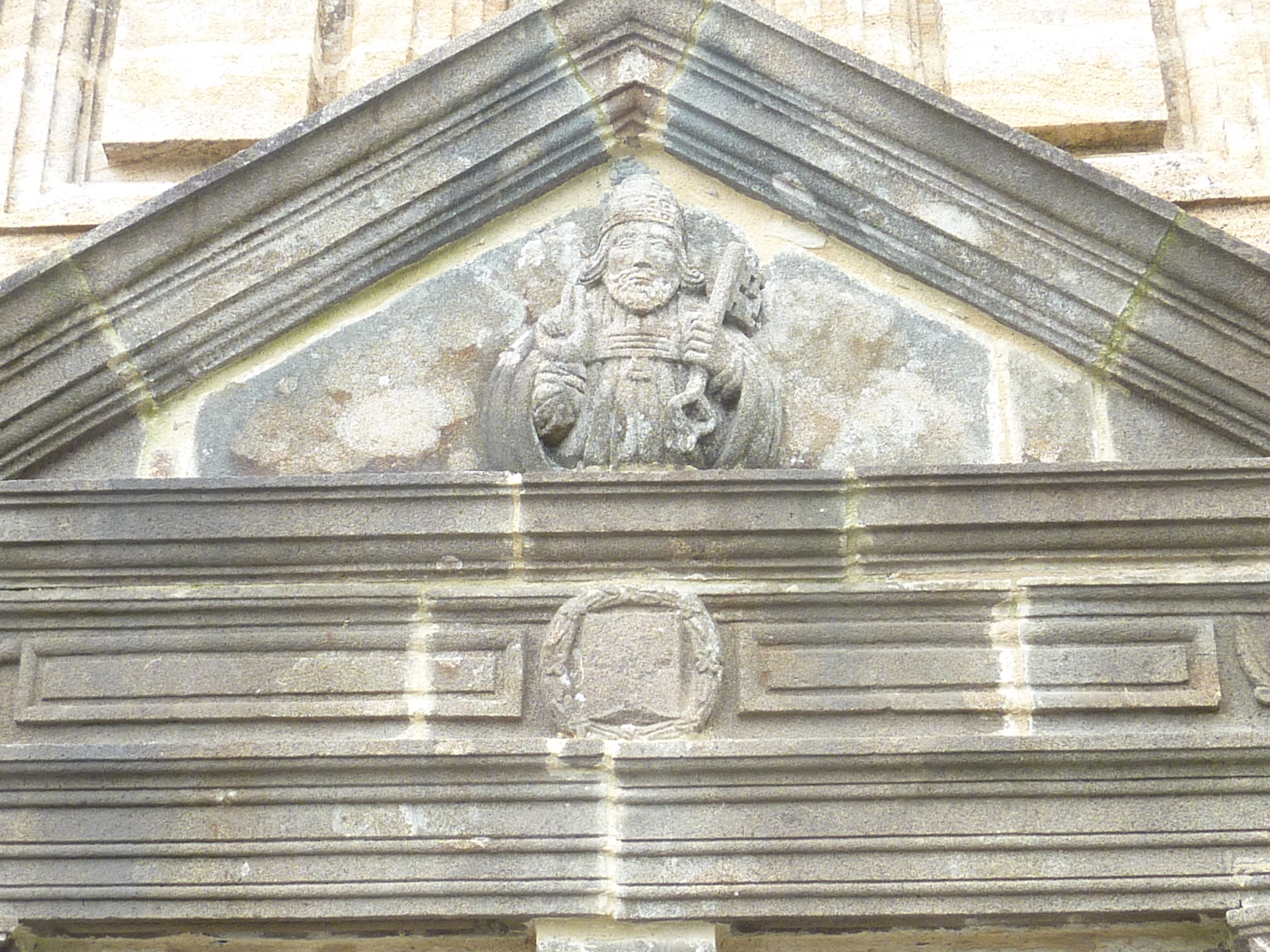
Saint Peter with key in the ossuary tympanum

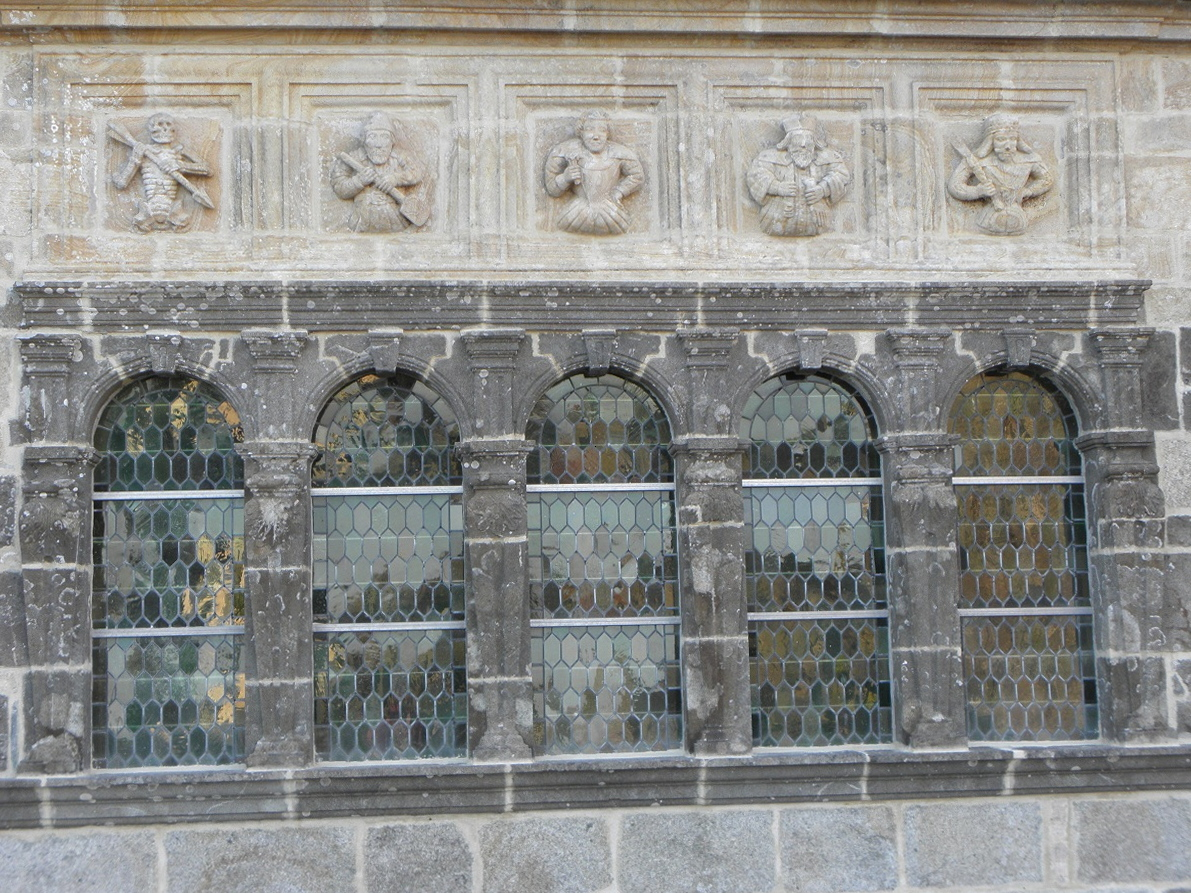
The five windows with frieze above.

== The Calvary ==
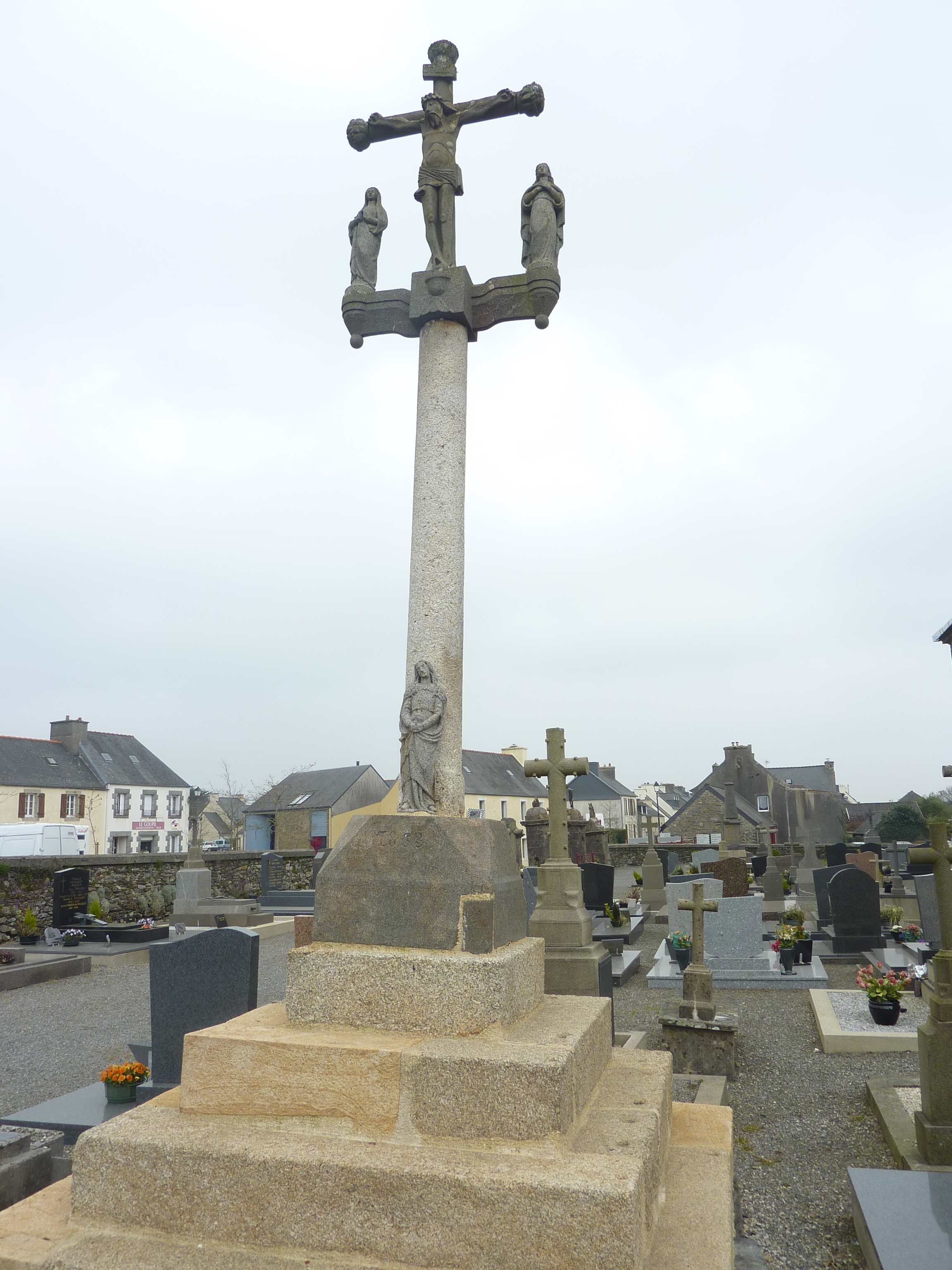
The calvary at Ploudiry

The calvary stands in the cemetery, on the north side of the enclosure. It has two dates, "1633" and "1868".

=== Sculptures at north entrance ===
Three sculptures decorate the north entrance of the enclosure.

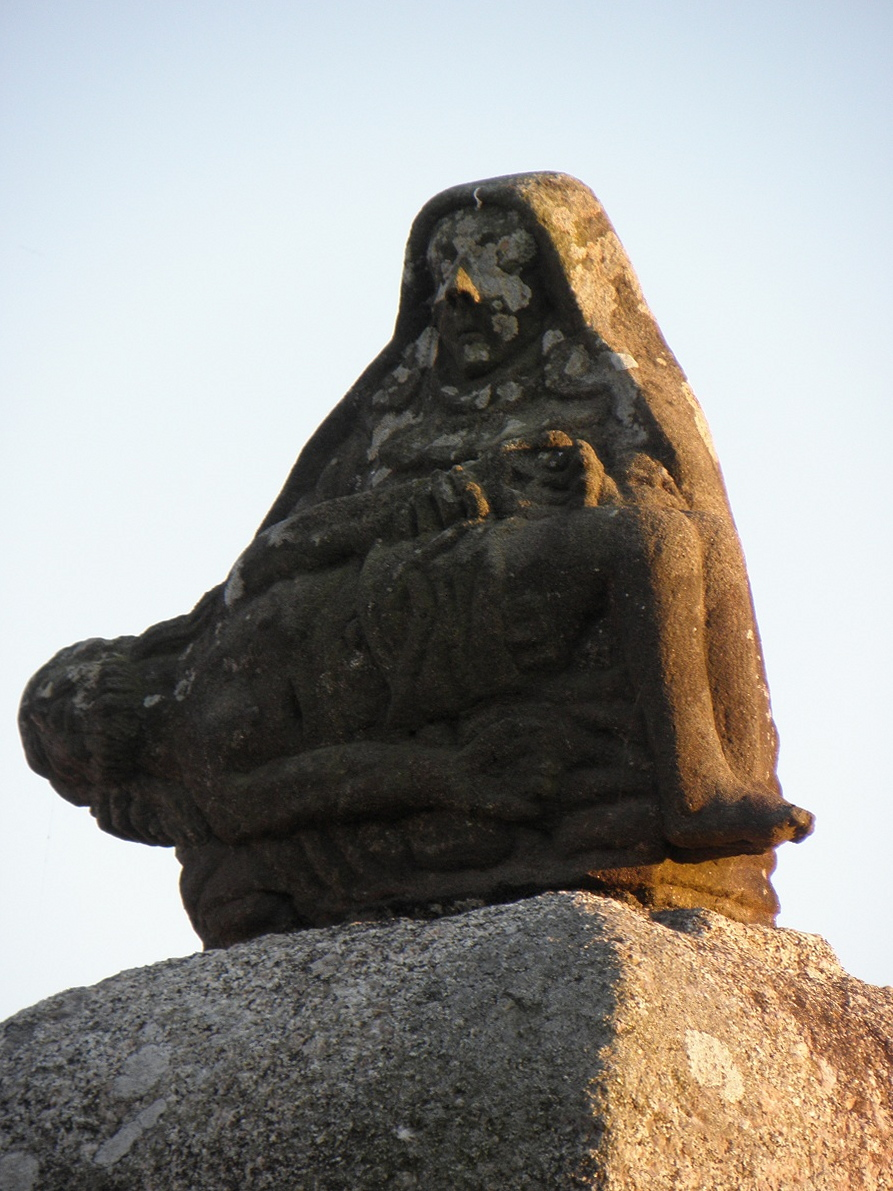
Pietà, north entrance.

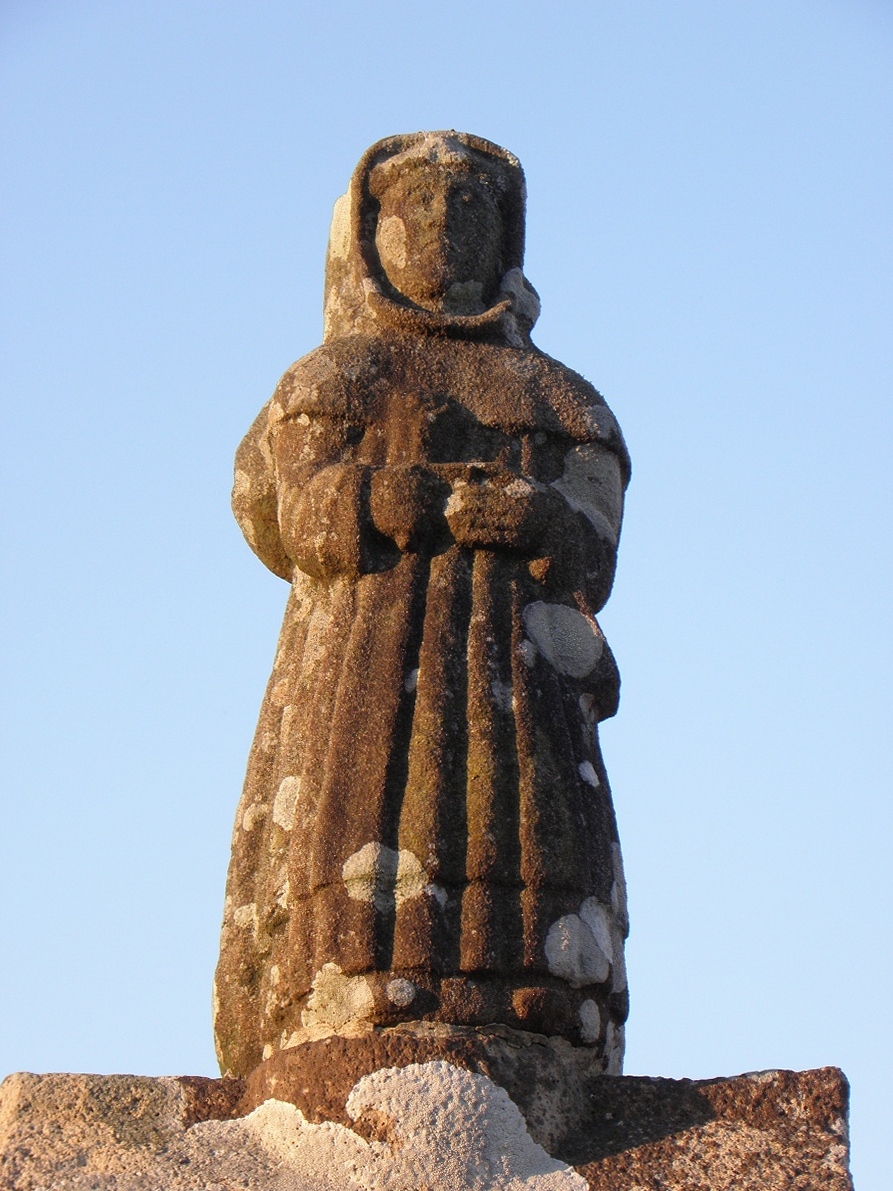
A saint, north entrance

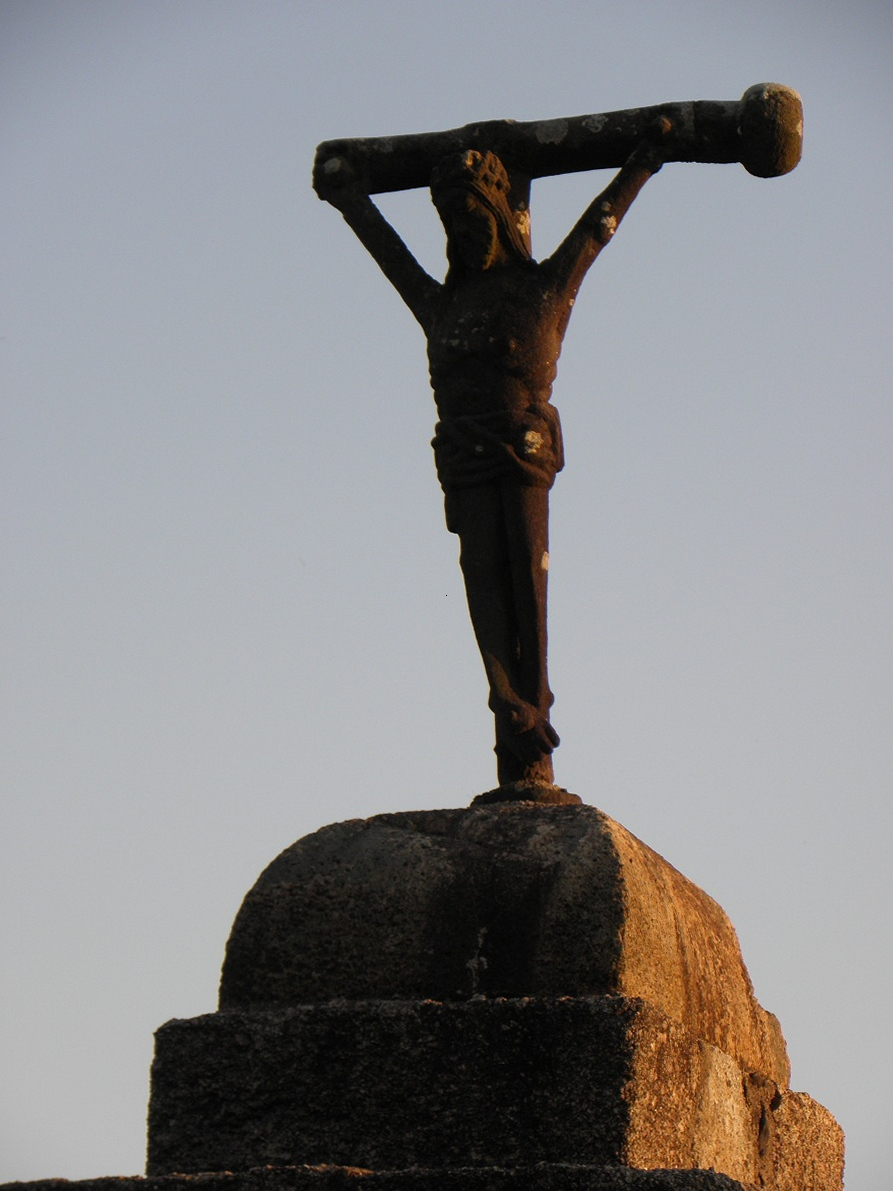
Jesus crucified, north entrance
