= Ploudiry =

Ploudiry Plouziri
- Commune
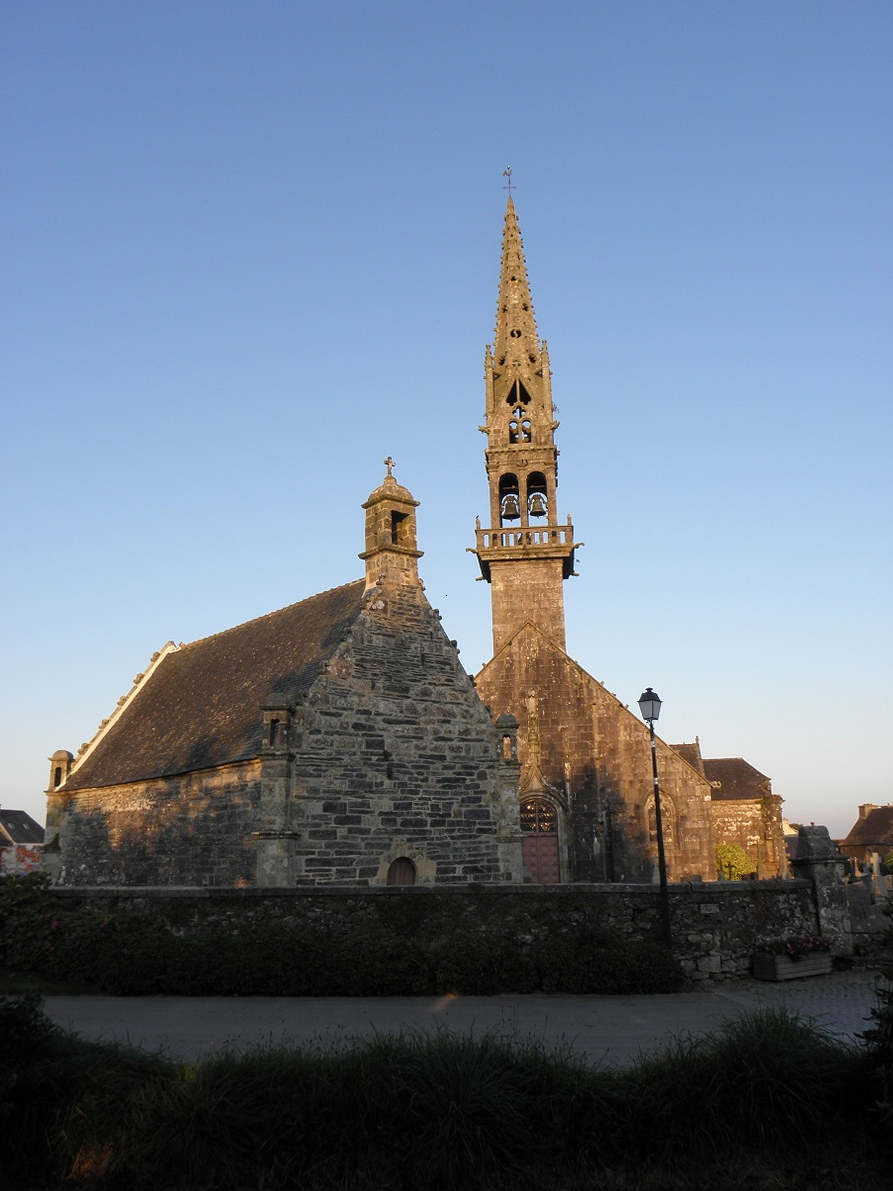
- The ossuary and the parish church in Ploudiry

- Coat of arms
- Location of Ploudiry
- Location within France Location within Brittany
- Coordinates: 48°27′16″N 4°08′29″W
- Country: France
- Region: Brittany
- Department: Finistère
- Arrondissement: Brest
- Canton: Pont-de-Buis-lès-Quimerch
- Intercommunality: CA Pays de Landerneau-Daoulas

Government
  - Mayor (2020–2026): Morgane Quentric-Bowman
- Area^{1}: 27.19 km^{2} (10.50 sq mi)
- Highest elevation: 191 m (627 ft)
- Lowest elevation: 23 m (75 ft)
- Population (2023): 872
  - Density: 32.1/km^{2} (83.1/sq mi)
- Time zone: UTC+01:00 (CET)
  - Summer (DST): UTC+02:00 (CEST)
- INSEE/Postal code: 29180 /29800
- ^{1} French Land Register data, which excludes lakes, ponds, glaciers > 1 km^{2} (0.386 sq mi or 247 acres) and river estuaries.

Ploudiry (French pronunciation: [pludiʁi]; Breton: Plouziri) is a commune in the Finistère department of Brittany in north-western France.

== Population ==
Inhabitants of Ploudiry are called in French Ploudiriens.

== See also ==
- Communes of the Finistère department
- Ploudiry Parish close
