= Kernilis =

Kernilis Kerniliz
- Commune
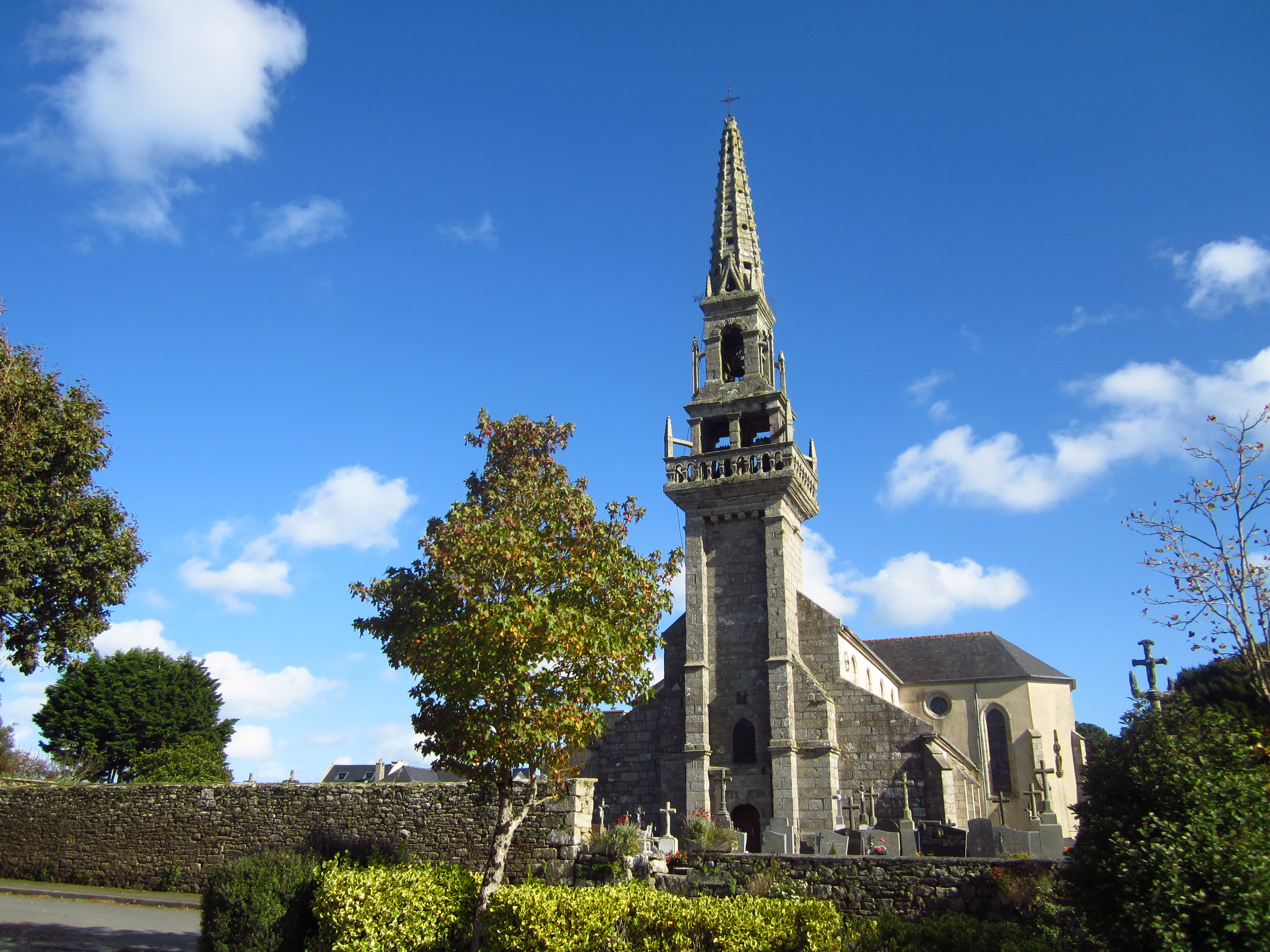
- The parish church of Sainte-Anne, in Kernilis

- Coat of arms
- Location of Kernilis
- Location within France Location within Brittany
- Coordinates: 48°34′19″N 4°25′04″W
- Country: France
- Region: Brittany
- Department: Finistère
- Arrondissement: Brest
- Canton: Lesneven
- Intercommunality: Lesneven Côte des Légendes

Government
  - Mayor (2020–2026): Sandra Roudaut
- Area^{1}: 10.13 km^{2} (3.91 sq mi)
- Highest elevation: 77 m (253 ft)
- Lowest elevation: 6 m (20 ft)
- Population (2023): 1,407
  - Density: 138.9/km^{2} (359.7/sq mi)
- Time zone: UTC+01:00 (CET)
  - Summer (DST): UTC+02:00 (CEST)
- INSEE/Postal code: 29093 /29260
- ^{1} French Land Register data, which excludes lakes, ponds, glaciers > 1 km^{2} (0.386 sq mi or 247 acres) and river estuaries.

Kernilis (French pronunciation: [kɛʁnilis]; Breton: Kerniliz) is a commune in the Finistère department of Brittany in northwestern France.

== Geography ==
=== Description ===
Kernilis is located in the Pays de Léon region, about ten kilometers west of Lesneven. The municipal boundary forms a quadrilateral close to a square, bordered to the south by the valley of the Aber Wrac'h, a small coastal river at this point. Its northern boundary coincides with the route of the D 32, an old Roman road (see below). The village of Kernilis is located at an altitude of 60 meters, with altitudes within the municipal territory ranging from 78 meters in the northeastern part, near Croas-ar-Justiçou, to 6 meters in the southwestern corner, where the Aber Wrac'h leaves the municipal territory. The village of Kernilis is clearly located to the south within the municipal boundaries. The main hamlets are Kerscao, Tréverroc, Kerbrat (Kerbrat-an-Dour and Kerbrat Huella), in the northern part, and Kerlouron, Carman, Kergouesnou and Le Moguer in the southern part of the municipal territory.

=== Hydrography ===
The commune is located in the Loire-Bretagne basin. It is drained by the Aber Vrac'h and various other small rivers.

The Aber-Wrac'h, 33 km long, rises in the commune of Trémaouézan and flows into the English Channel between the communes of Landéda and Plouguerneau, after crossing ten communes. The hydrological characteristics of the Aber Wrac'h are provided by the hydrological station located in the commune of Lanarvily. The average monthly flow rate is 1.58 m3/s. The maximum average daily flow rate is 15.5 m3/s, reached during the flood of 7 February 2014. The maximum instantaneous flow rate is 18.3 m3/s, reached on the same day.

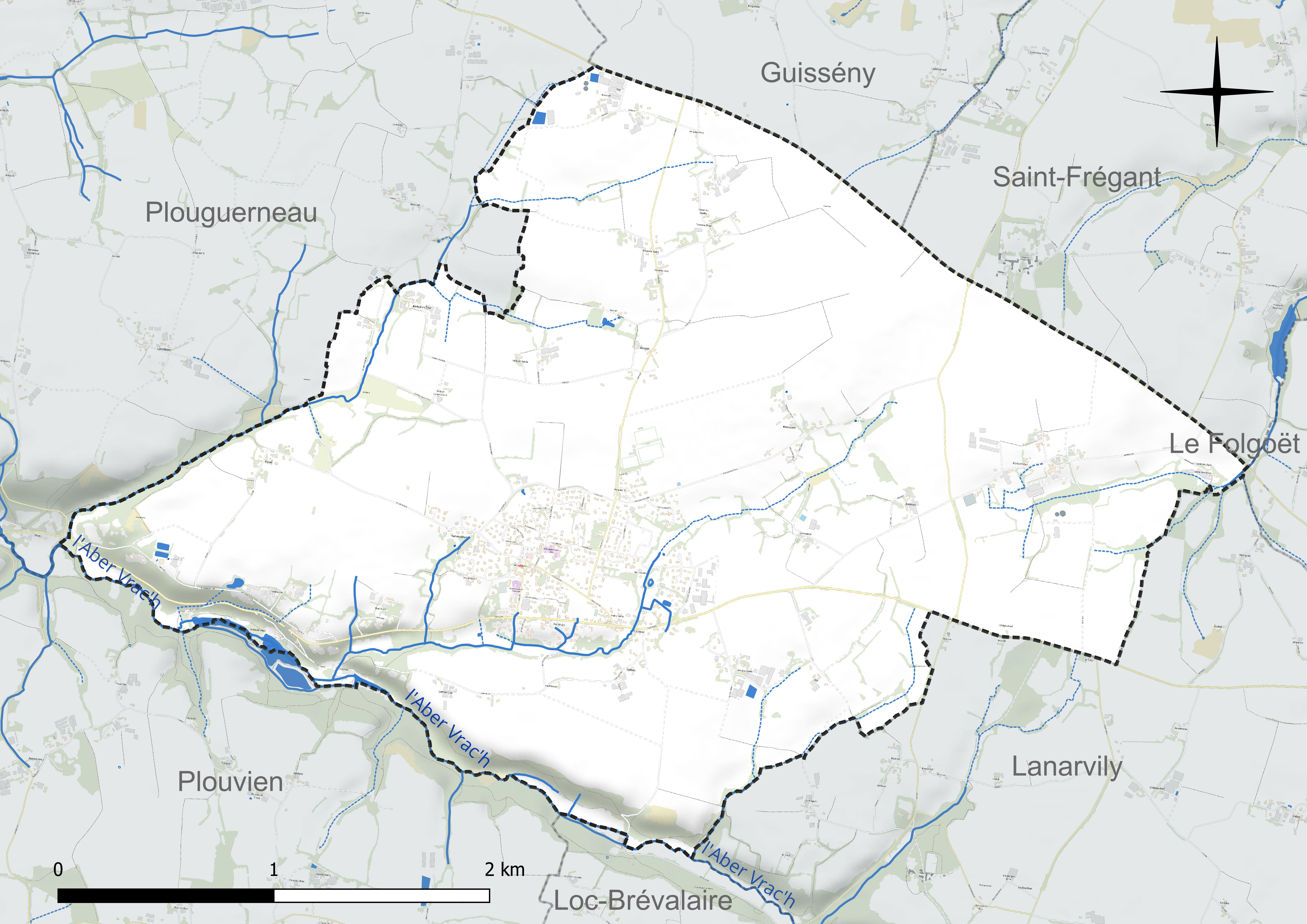
Kernilis hydrographic network.

== Heraldry ==
Adopted on 13 May 1980.

Arms of Kernilis	Or, a lion azure; a chief argent charged with three ermine spots sable.

== Urban planning ==
=== Typology ===
As of 1 January 2024, Kernilis is categorized as a rural town, according to the new 7-level municipal density grid defined by INSEE in 2022. It is located outside an urban unit. Furthermore, the commune is part of the Brest catchment area, of which it is a suburban commune. This area, which includes 68 communes, is categorized in areas with 200,000 to less than 700,000 inhabitants.

=== Land use ===
The land use of the municipality, as shown in the European biophysical land use database Corine Land Cover (CLC), is marked by the importance of agricultural territories (87.5% in 2018), a decrease compared to 1990 (89.9%). The detailed breakdown in 2018 is as follows: arable land (52.1%), heterogeneous agricultural areas (31.3%), urbanized areas (7.9%), forests (4.7%), meadows (4%)[17]. The evolution of the land use of the municipality and its infrastructure can be observed on the various cartographic representations of the territory: the Cassini map (18th century), the general staff map (1820-1866) and the IGN maps or aerial photos for the current period (1950 to today).

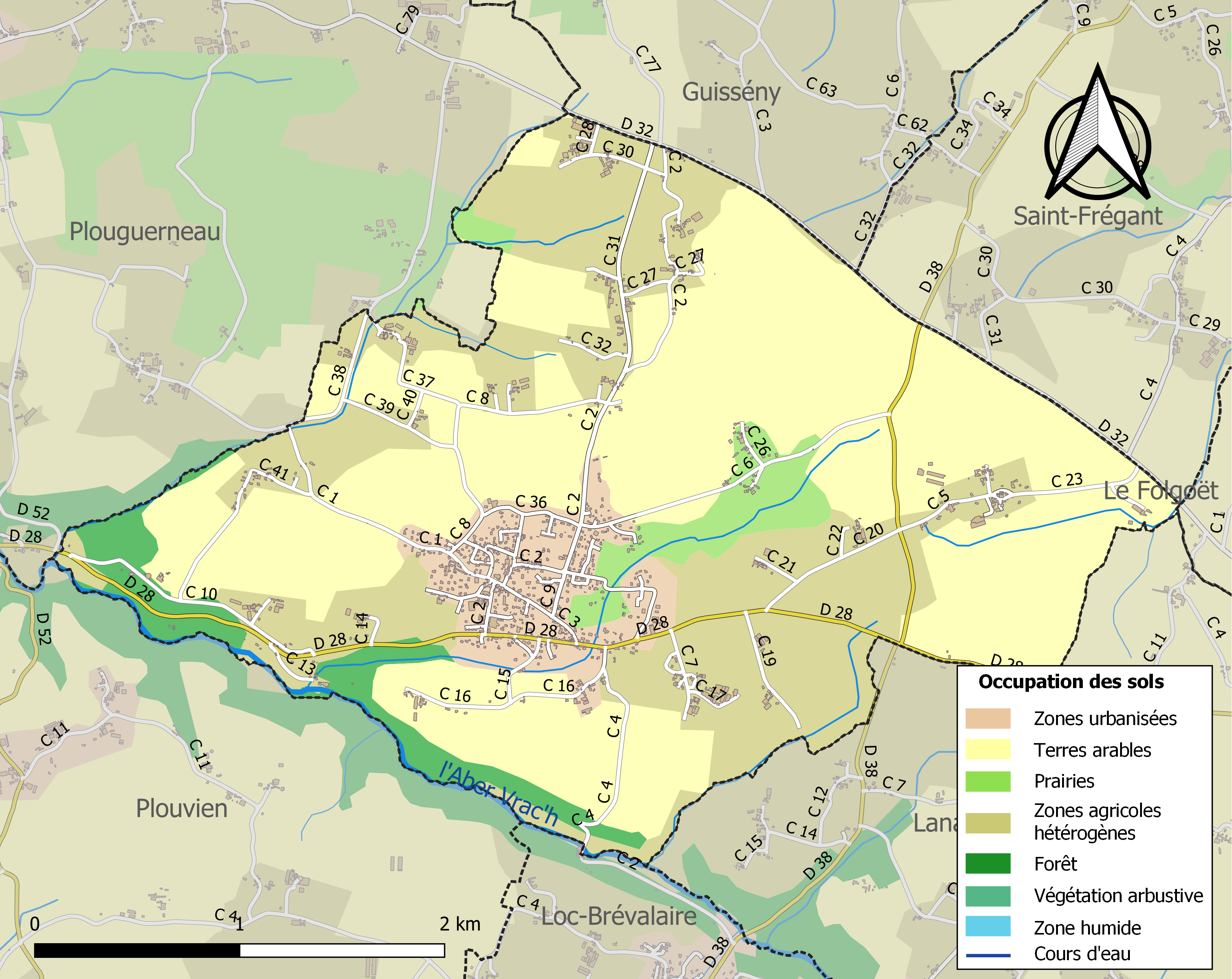
Map of infrastructure and land use in the commune in 2018 (CLC).

== Toponymy ==
The name of the commune in Breton is Kerniliz.

=== Etymology ===
The name of the parish and then that of the commune is Breton. It comes from the contraction of Ker an Ilis meaning "the village of the church".

== Monuments and sites ==
- Monument to the dead of 1914-1918;
- Saint Anne Church.

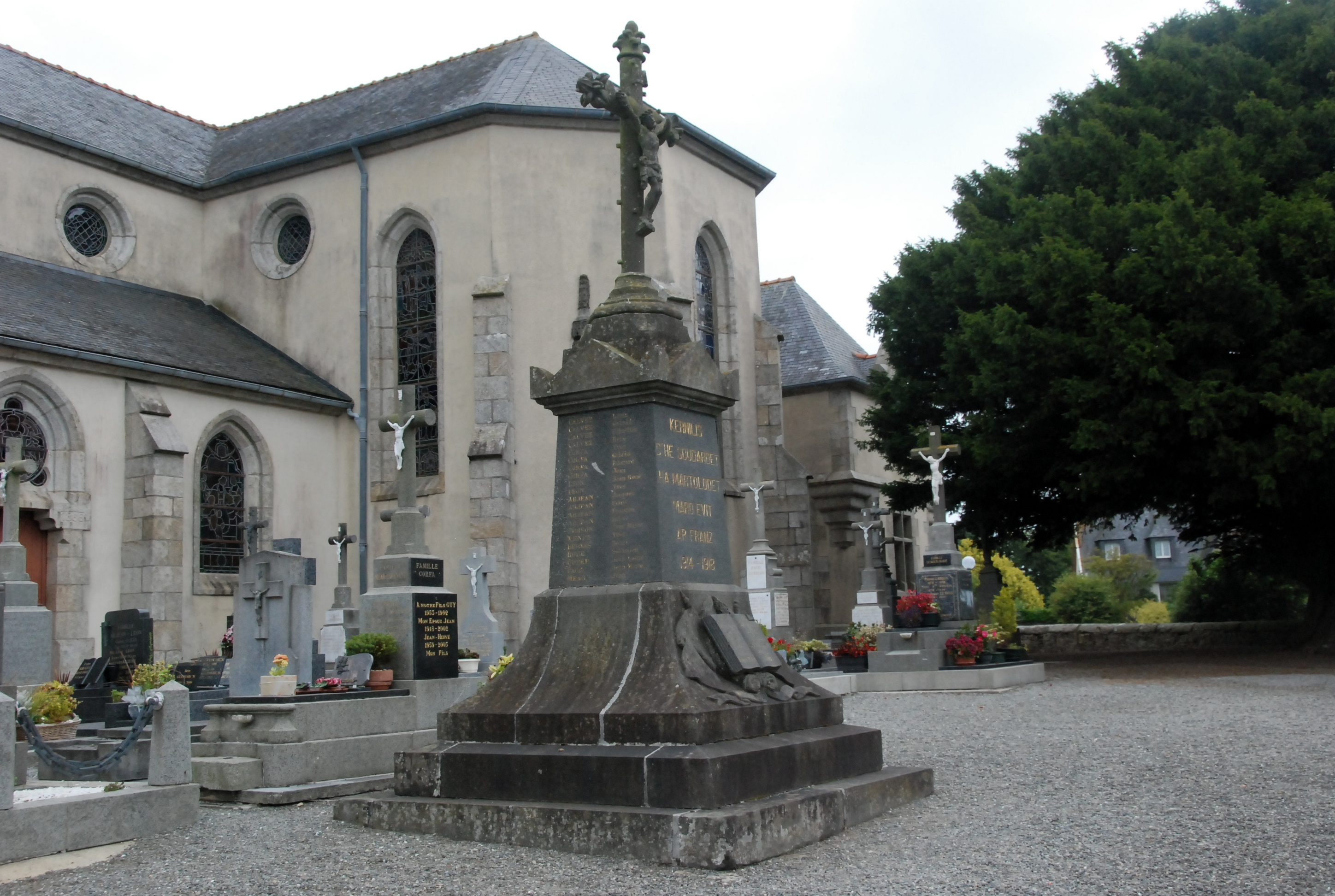
Monument to the dead of 1914-1918.

- One of the four yew trees planted by the lord of Maillé-Carman (a Huguenot) who was killed in a duel by the lord of Troménec in Landéda, a member of the League, still survives: it is around 400 years old and has a circumference of 3.5 metres at 80 cm from the ground.

== Population ==
Inhabitants of Kernilis are called in French Kernilisiens.

== See also ==
- Communes of the Finistère department
