= Marie-Françoise Bougaran =

French serial killer (1850–1875)

- Born: 4 September 1850; Plabennec, Finistère, France
- Died: 1875 (aged 24); Saint-Laurent-du-Maroni, French Guiana
- Occupation: Servant
- Status: Deceased
- Penalty: 20 years imprisonment

Details
- Victims: 3
- Date: November 1865
- Country: France
- State: Finistère
- Target: Children
- Weapon: Knife
- Date apprehended: 1865

Marie-Françoise Bougaran (4 September 1850 – 1875) was a French serial killer who murdered three children of the Robinaud family between 12 and 26 November 1865 while she worked as the family's maid. In each case, she forced the children to swallow excrement for several days before breaking their limbs and killing them via suffocation or cutting the veins of their necks with a knife. After attempting to murder a fourth child, she was arrested, and later sentenced to 20 years imprisonment. In 1875, she died at the age of 24.

== Early life ==
Marie-Françoise Bougaran was born on 4 September 1850 in Plabennec. When she was five years old, her mother died. Five years later, her father, little brother, and half-brother died. Afterwards, she was adopted by her uncle in Ploudaniel. She learnt to read through lessons by a teacher from Trégarantec, but did not adjust to her new family. In June 1865, Bougaran was sent to work as a servant for her cousin, Gabrielle Bougaran, who managed an inn in Lesneven with her husband. Soon after her arrival, she began to suffer from dizziness, tinnitus, migraines, genital pain, and what she described as "dark thoughts". Gabrielle, who saw Bougaran as a thief and liar, sent her to work as a maid for another family.

== Crimes ==
In October 1865, she began working as a maid for Joseph-Henri and Marie-Vincente Robinaud and their four children, a lower middle class family.

On 12 November 1865, Bougaran murdered 8-month-old Josephine Robinaud by inserting her fingers into the infant's mouth until she suffocated to death. Prior to her death, Bougaran fractured Josephine's femur and two bones in her lower right leg by twisting her limbs. Josephine had also been vomiting feces for several days before she died.

On 18 November 1865, Anna Robinaud, aged five, started to vomit blood and feces. The next evening, Joseph-Henri heard her daughter scream to Bougaran, who slept beside her, "you have thrust a knife in my throat!" Bougaran denied the accusation, so Anna's father went back to sleep. 25 minutes later, Anna screamed again. Upon entering her daughter's bedroom, Joseph-Henri saw Bougaran removing feces from Anna's mouth. At 3 a.m. that night, Bougaran forcefully put a knife into Anna's mouth and severed her carotid artery from the inside of her throat. Two doctors conducted an autopsy and mistakenly attributed her death to intestinal hemorrhaging.

On 15 November 1865, two-year-old Henri Robinaud returned home after a few days' absence. Like his siblings, he began to vomit feces. On the 23rd, he started vomiting blood as well. His right arm had also been broken. On 26 November, Bougaran put a knife in his mouth and cut the veins of his neck from the inside of his throat. After he died, Bougaran told Henri's mother, "Here is the little Henri who dies like his sister." Doctors decided not to conduct an autopsy on Henri.

== Imprisonment ==
Bougaran, realizing she could not remain with the Robinaud family, offered herself as a servant to the Menou family, and began working for them on 28 November. One day later, Mr. Menou heard his two-year-old daughter shout. When he investigated the commotion, he saw Bougaran forcing excrement into his child's mouth. He subsequently fired her and sent her back to her family. He also alerted the gendarmes, who quickly linked Bougaran to the deaths of the Robinaud children.

Before her trial, she admitted to introducing feces into the children's mouths. On the same evening, she consumed her own excrement, causing her to vomit blood. The bodies of the children she murdered were exhumed and given more thorough autopsies, revealing their true cause of death. Upon hearing the results of the autopsies, Bougaran exclaimed, "Oh! My God! I am a great criminal. It is I who sent those poor children to paradise before their time!"

Bougaran's trial, held at an Assize Court in Quimper, was held in April 1866. Her lawyer attempted to convince the jury that Bougaran had dementia praecox, and could therefore not be criminally responsible. The jury rejected the argumentation and found her guilty. Although Bougaran was below the age of majority, she was sentenced to 20 years imprisonment.

=== Transfer and death ===
After serving five years in Rennes, she was transferred to a prison in Saint-Laurent-du-Maroni, French Guiana, at her own request. In 1874, she married a former convict 32 years her senior, who was convicted of murdering his two previous wives. The following year, she died at age 24.
