= Aber Wrac'h =

Village in France

Coordinates: 48°35′49″N 4°33′44″W

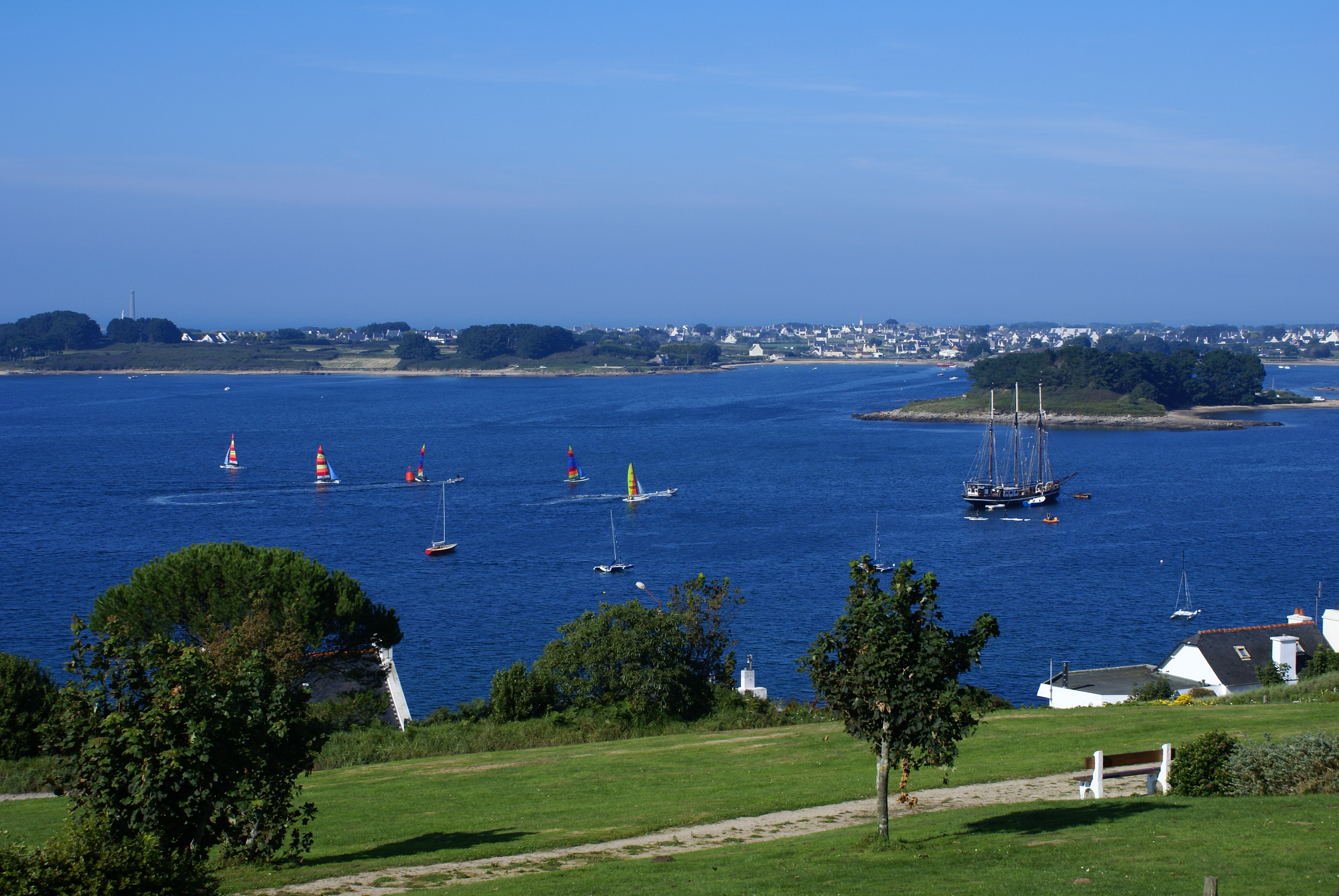
Aber Wrac'h

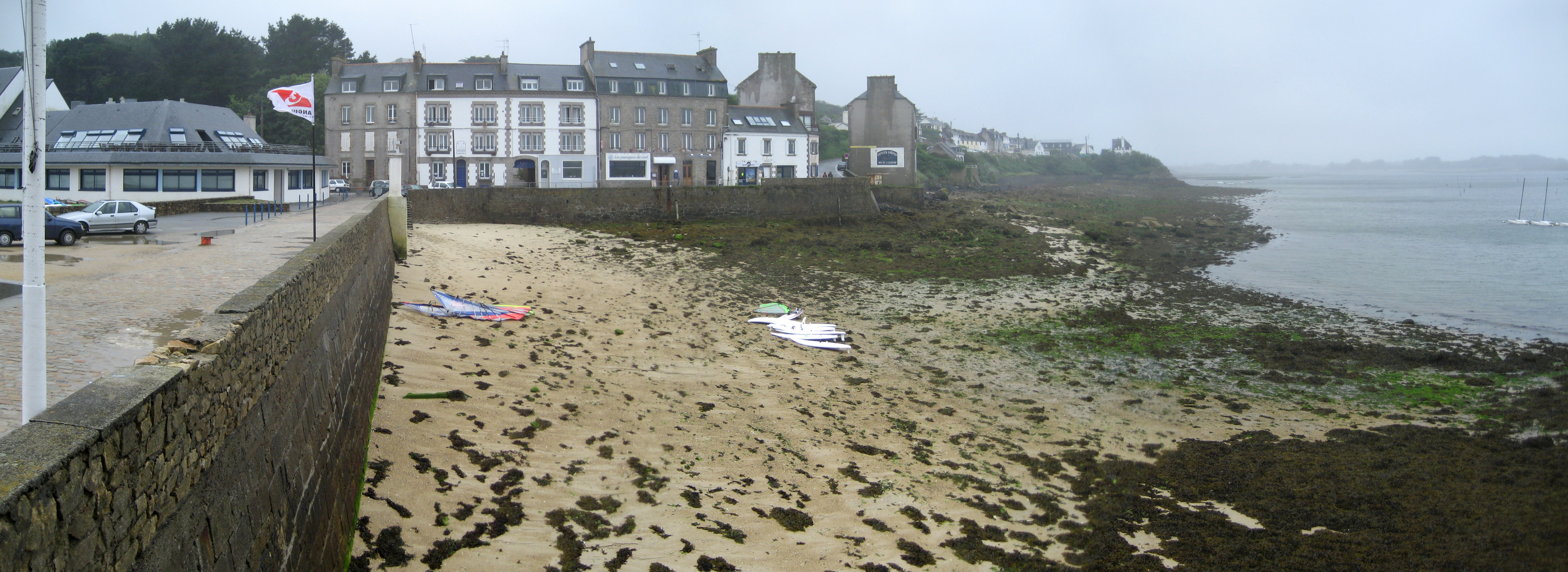
Typical Coast of L'Aberwrac'h

Aber Wrac'h is a small village and port located on the river which shares its name in the commune of Landéda in the department of Finistère in France, located in Brittany.

The source of the Wrac'h river is in Trémaouézan. It travels through Ploudaniel, Le Folgoët, Lannilis and Plouguerneau and enters the ocean in the estuary between the Sainte Marguerite peninsula and the headland of the Virgin Island.

== Origin of the name ==
The Aber Wrac'h could derive its name from the first immersed rock of its channel, “Ar Wrach”, which means “the old woman” (or the wrasse) in Breton.

An alternative theory is that the name is derived from the “estuary of the fairy” which may be related to the alleged Gallo-Roman bridge located upstream of the river mouth (ruins still visible today) named Pont Krac'h (Bridge of the Devil).

British accounts of the 18th and 19th Century give the town's name as Averach.

== History ==
The United States Navy established a naval air station on 4 June 1918 to operate seaplanes during World War I. The base closed shortly after the First Armistice at Compiègne.

== Islands in the vicinity of Aber Wrac'h ==
They following archipelago is also referred to as the islands of Lilia :

- Cézon island and its Fort
- Wrac'h Island
- Stagadon island
- Island of Erch
- Island of the Cross

== Recreation ==
The village is a popular location and base for sailing, windsurfing and kitesurfing.

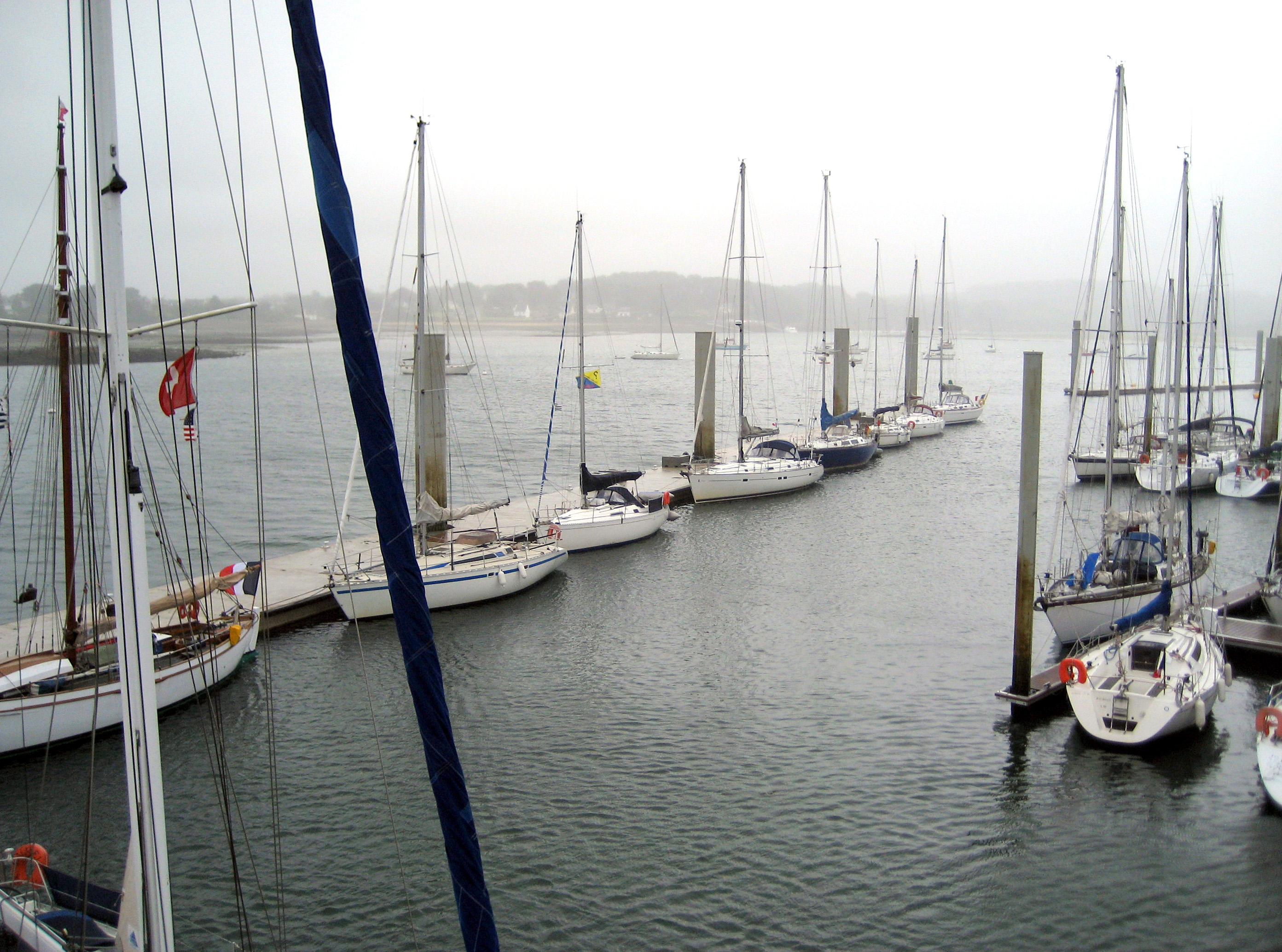
Marina of L'Aberwrac'h...

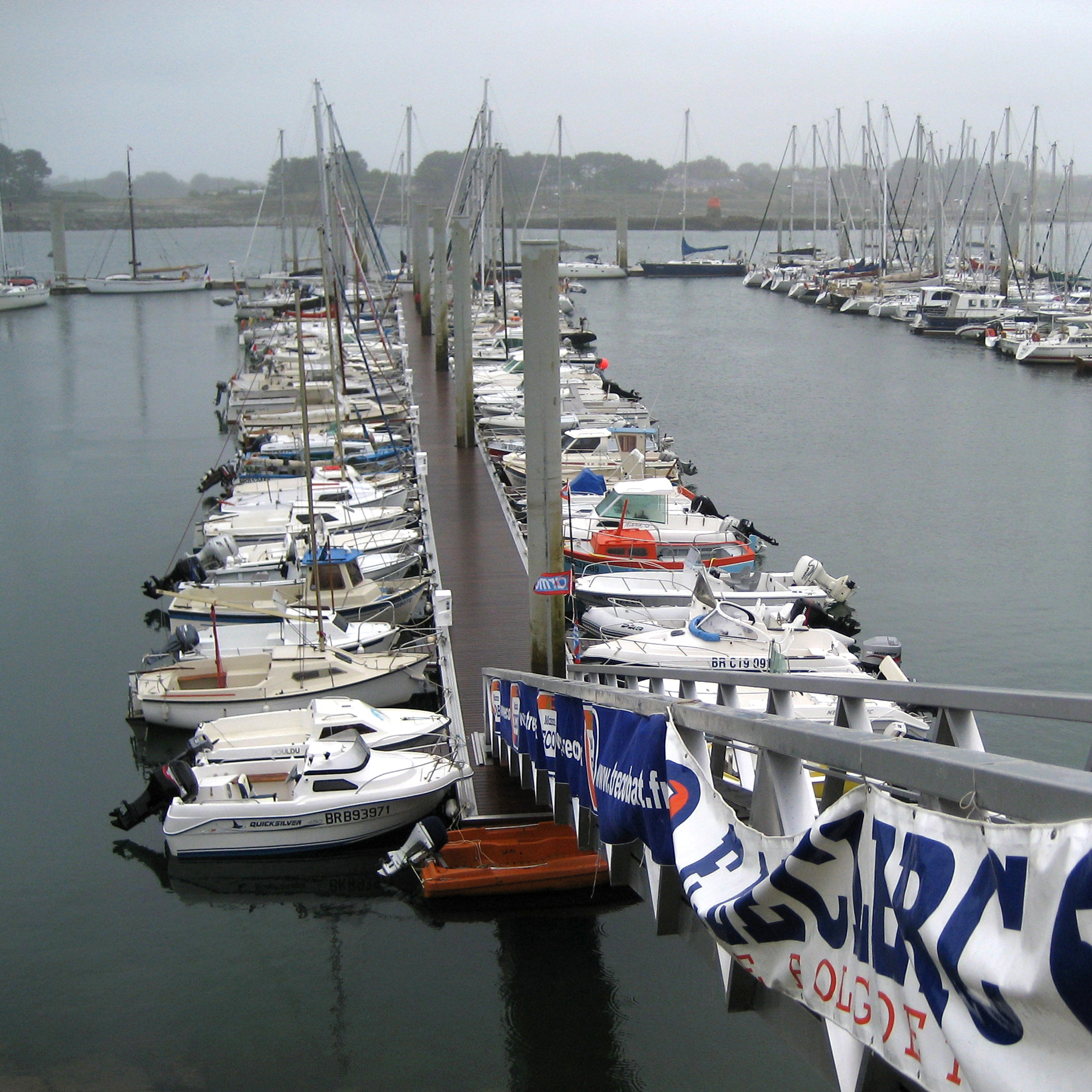
...with pole-mounted floating bridges: at low tide...

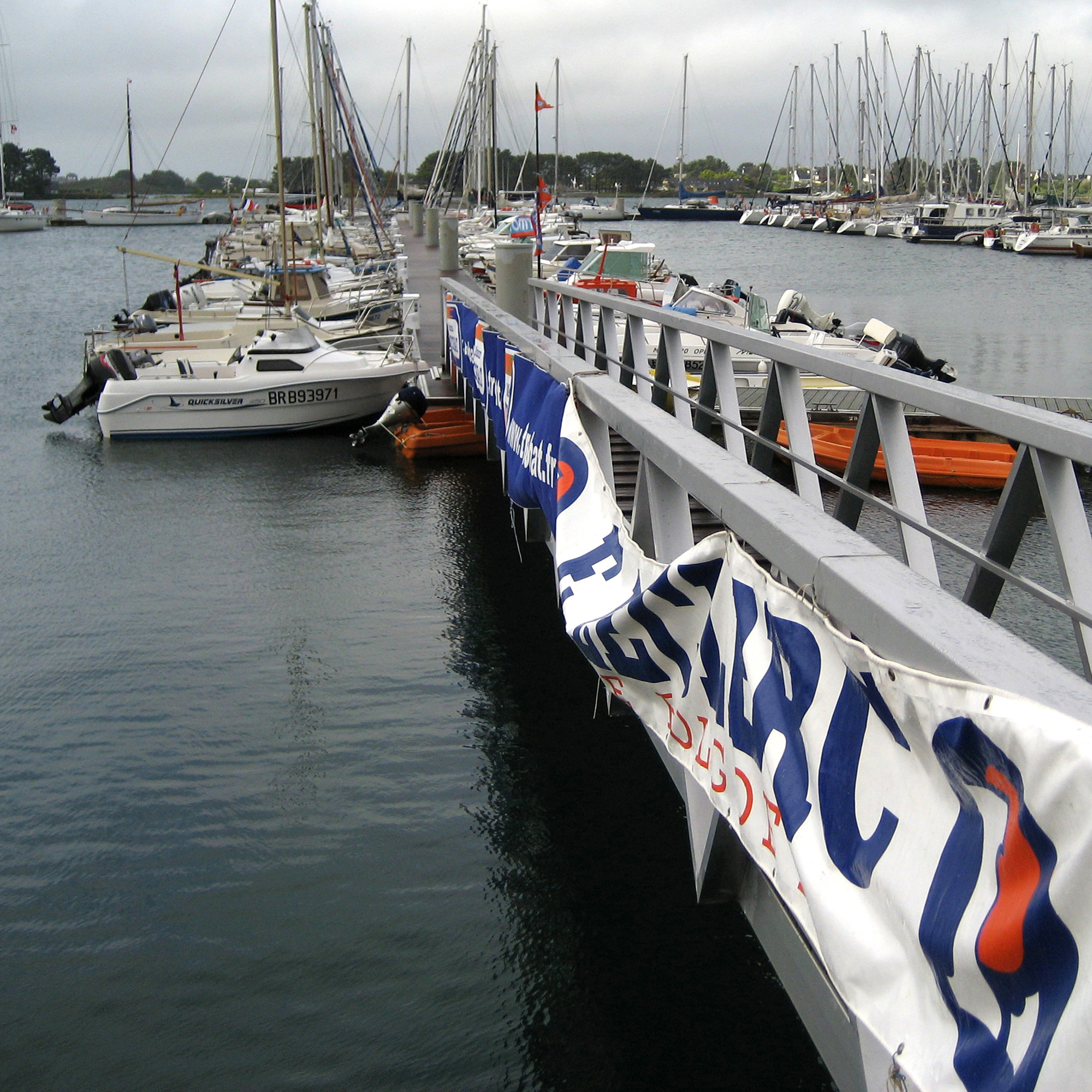
...and high tide

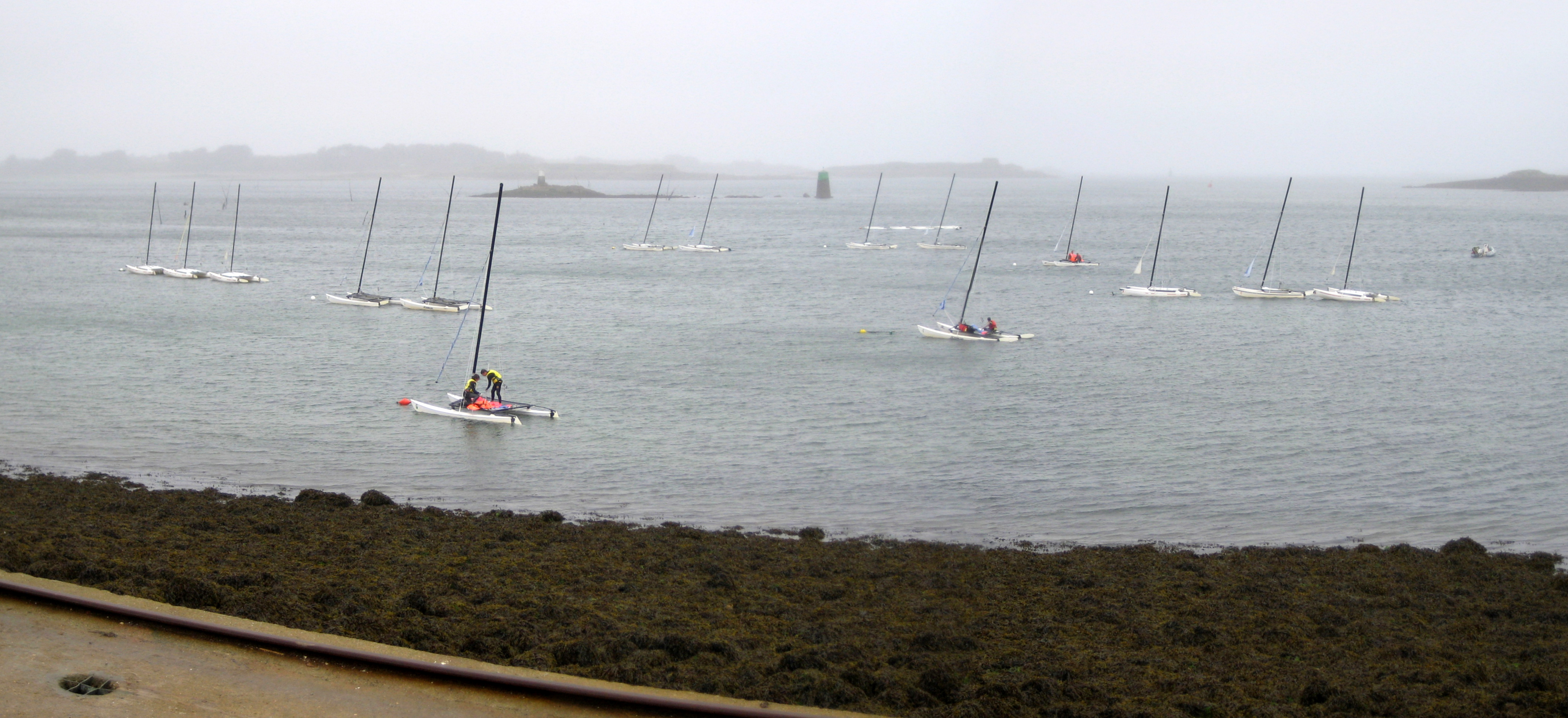
Catamarans moored outside
