= Arrondissement of Brest =

Coordinates: 48°23′N 4°29′W

Brest
- Arrondissement
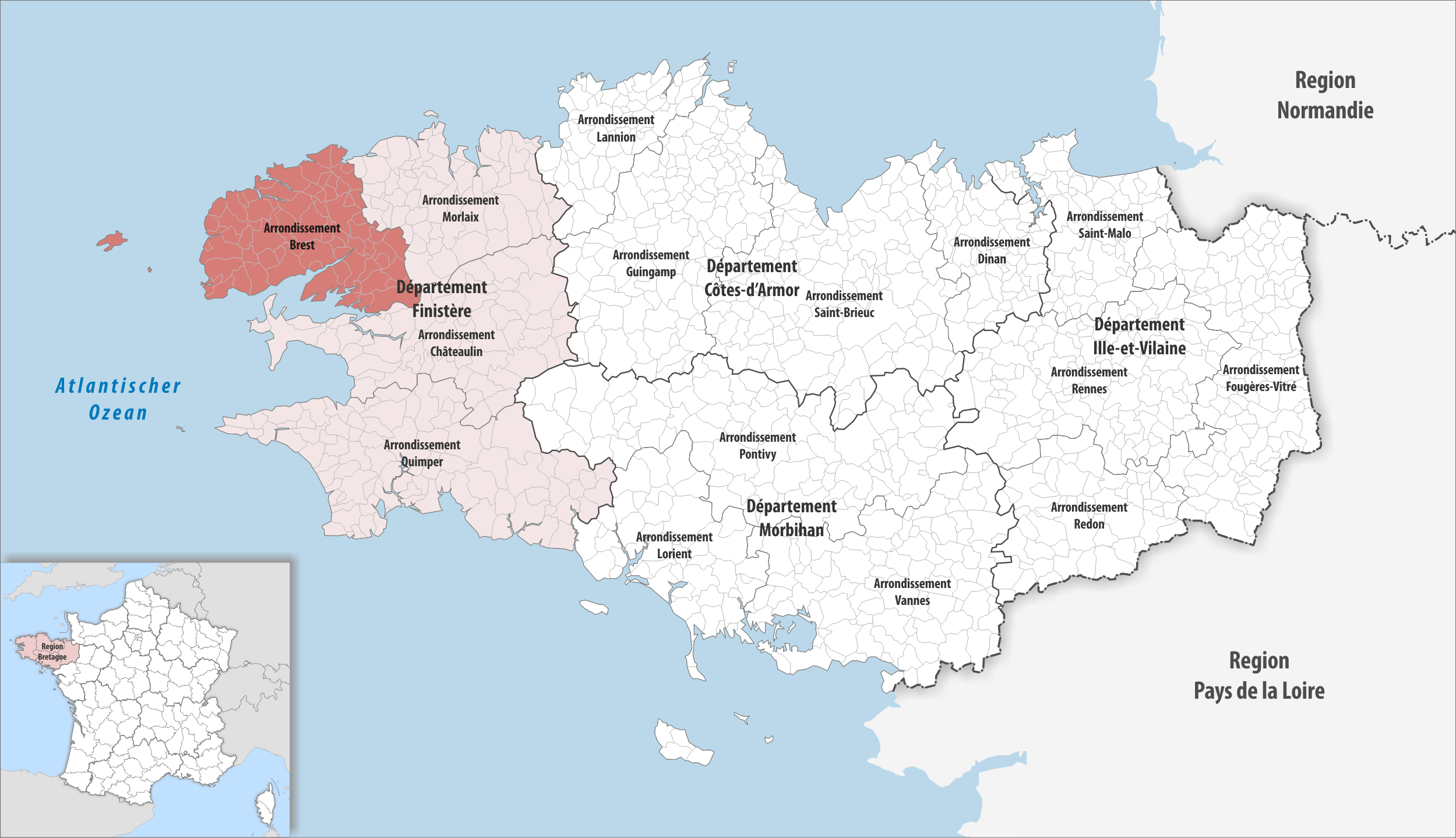
- Location within the region Brittany
- Country: France
- Region: Brittany
- Department: Finistère
- No. of communes: {{{nbcomm}}}
- Area: 1,396.2 km^{2} (539.1 sq mi)
- Population (2023): 386,563
  - Density: 276.87/km^{2} (717.08/sq mi)
- INSEE code: 291

The arrondissement of Brest is an arrondissement of France in the Finistère department in the Brittany region. It has 77 communes. Its population is 381,226 (2021), and its area is 1,396.2 km^{2} (539.1 sq mi).

== Composition ==
The communes of the arrondissement of Brest, and their INSEE codes, are:

1. Bohars (29011)
2. Bourg-Blanc (29015)
3. Brélès (29017)
4. Brest (29019)
5. Coat-Méal (29035)
6. Le Conquet (29040)
7. Daoulas (29043)
8. Dirinon (29045)
9. Le Drennec (29047)
10. Le Folgoët (29055)
11. La Forest-Landerneau (29056)
12. Gouesnou (29061)
13. Goulven (29064)
14. Guilers (29069)
15. Guipavas (29075)
16. Guissény (29077)
17. Hanvec (29078)
18. Hôpital-Camfrout (29080)
19. Île-Molène (29084)
20. Irvillac (29086)
21. Kerlouan (29091)
22. Kernilis (29093)
23. Kernouës (29094)
24. Kersaint-Plabennec (29095)
25. Lampaul-Plouarzel (29098)
26. Lampaul-Ploudalmézeau (29099)
27. Lanarvily (29100)
28. Landéda (29101)
29. Landerneau (29103)
30. Landunvez (29109)
31. Lanildut (29112)
32. Lanneuffret (29116)
33. Lannilis (29117)
34. Lanrivoaré (29119)
35. Lesneven (29124)
36. Loc-Brévalaire (29126)
37. Locmaria-Plouzané (29130)
38. Logonna-Daoulas (29137)
39. Loperhet (29140)
40. La Martyre (29144)
41. Milizac-Guipronvel (29076)
42. Ouessant (29155)
43. Pencran (29156)
44. Plabennec (29160)
45. Plouarzel (29177)
46. Ploudalmézeau (29178)
47. Ploudaniel (29179)
48. Ploudiry (29180)
49. Plouédern (29181)
50. Plougastel-Daoulas (29189)
51. Plougonvelin (29190)
52. Plouguerneau (29195)
53. Plouguin (29196)
54. Plouider (29198)
55. Ploumoguer (29201)
56. Plounéour-Brignogan-Plages (29021)
57. Plourin (29208)
58. Plouvien (29209)
59. Plouzané (29212)
60. Porspoder (29221)
61. Le Relecq-Kerhuon (29235)
62. La Roche-Maurice (29237)
63. Saint-Divy (29245)
64. Saint-Eloy (29246)
65. Saint-Frégant (29248)
66. Saint-Méen (29255)
67. Saint-Pabu (29257)
68. Saint-Renan (29260)
69. Saint-Thonan (29268)
70. Saint-Urbain (29270)
71. Trébabu (29282)
72. Tréflévénez (29286)
73. Trégarantec (29288)
74. Tréglonou (29290)
75. Le Tréhou (29294)
76. Trémaouézan (29295)
77. Tréouergat (29299)

== History ==
The arrondissement of Brest was created in 1800. At the January 2017 reorganisation of the arrondissements of Finistère, it lost one commune to the arrondissement of Morlaix.

As a result of the reorganisation of the cantons of France which came into effect in 2015, the borders of the cantons are no longer related to the borders of the arrondissements. The cantons of the arrondissement of Brest were, as of January 2015:

1. Brest-Bellevue
2. Brest-Cavale-Blanche-Bohars-Guilers
3. Brest-Centre
4. Brest-Kerichen
5. Brest-Lambezellec
6. Brest-L'Hermitage-Gouesnou
7. Brest-Plouzané
8. Brest-Recouvrance
9. Brest-Saint-Marc
10. Brest-Saint-Pierre
11. Daoulas
12. Guipavas
13. Landerneau
14. Lannilis
15. Lesneven
16. Ouessant
17. Plabennec
18. Ploudalmézeau
19. Ploudiry
20. Saint-Renan
