= Cadart =

Cadart is a surname. Notable people with the surname include:

- Alfred Cadart (1828–1875), French printer, writer and publisher
- Claude Cadart (1927–2019), French sinologist
- Jeanne Jégou-Cadart, French painter
- Rodolphe Cadart (born 1978), French tennis player
