= Le Drennec =

Le Drennec An Dreneg
- Commune
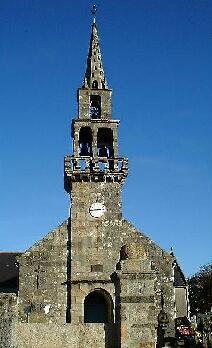
- The church in Le Drennec

- Coat of arms
- Location of Le Drennec
- Location within France Location within Brittany
- Coordinates: 48°32′09″N 4°22′11″W
- Country: France
- Region: Brittany
- Department: Finistère
- Arrondissement: Brest
- Canton: Lesneven
- Intercommunality: Pays des Abers

Government
  - Mayor (2020–2026): Monique Loaec
- Area^{1}: 9.50 km^{2} (3.67 sq mi)
- Highest elevation: 85 m (279 ft)
- Lowest elevation: 22 m (72 ft)
- Population (2023): 1,896
  - Density: 200/km^{2} (517/sq mi)
- Time zone: UTC+01:00 (CET)
  - Summer (DST): UTC+02:00 (CEST)
- INSEE/Postal code: 29047 /29860
- ^{1} French Land Register data, which excludes lakes, ponds, glaciers > 1 km^{2} (0.386 sq mi or 247 acres) and river estuaries.

Le Drennec (French pronunciation: [lə dʁɛnɛk]; Breton: An Dreneg) is a commune in the Finistère department of Brittany in north-western France.

== Population ==
Inhabitants of Le Drennec are called in French Drennecois.

== See also ==
- Communes of the Finistère department
