= Goulven =

Goulven Goulc'hen
- Commune
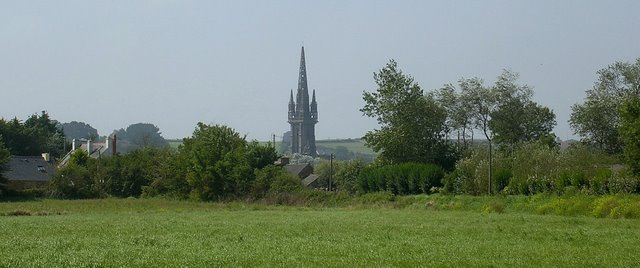
- A general view of Goulven
- Location of Goulven
- Location within France Location within Brittany
- Coordinates: 48°37′48″N 4°17′58″W
- Country: France
- Region: Brittany
- Department: Finistère
- Arrondissement: Brest
- Canton: Lesneven
- Intercommunality: Lesneven Côte des Légendes

Government
  - Mayor (2020–2026): Yves Iliou
- Area^{1}: 6.38 km^{2} (2.46 sq mi)
- Highest elevation: 66 m (217 ft)
- Lowest elevation: 1 m (3.3 ft)
- Population (2023): 432
  - Density: 67.7/km^{2} (175/sq mi)
- Time zone: UTC+01:00 (CET)
  - Summer (DST): UTC+02:00 (CEST)
- INSEE/Postal code: 29064 /29890
- ^{1} French Land Register data, which excludes lakes, ponds, glaciers > 1 km^{2} (0.386 sq mi or 247 acres) and river estuaries.

Goulven (French pronunciation: [ɡulvɛ̃]; Breton: Goulc'hen) is a commune in the Finistère department of Brittany in northwestern France.

== Population ==
Inhabitants of Goulven are called in French Goulvinois.

== See also ==
- Communes of the Finistère department
