= Jeanne Jégou-Cadart =

French painter

Jeanne Jégou-Cadart was a French painter from the late 19th to early 20th centuries. She lived in Kernouës, Brittany, and also in Paris.

Jeanne Jégou-Cadart is particularly known for her pastel works. She notably took part in the first exhibition of the Association des Artistes du IVe arrondissement in Paris in May 1913, as well as in two exhibitions at the gallery Devambez (Maison Devambez) in 1917 and 1919. Her works, some of which is part of the collections of the Carnavalet Museum in Paris, illustrate the diverse influences, lofty aspirations, and deep emotions that this Breton and Parisian artist combined.

Paintings of Jeanne Jégou-Cadart at Carnavalet Museum in Paris.

== See also ==
- Lesneven in Brittany, France
- Kernouës in Brittany, France
