= Loc-Brévalaire =

Loc-Brévalaire Loprevaler
- Commune
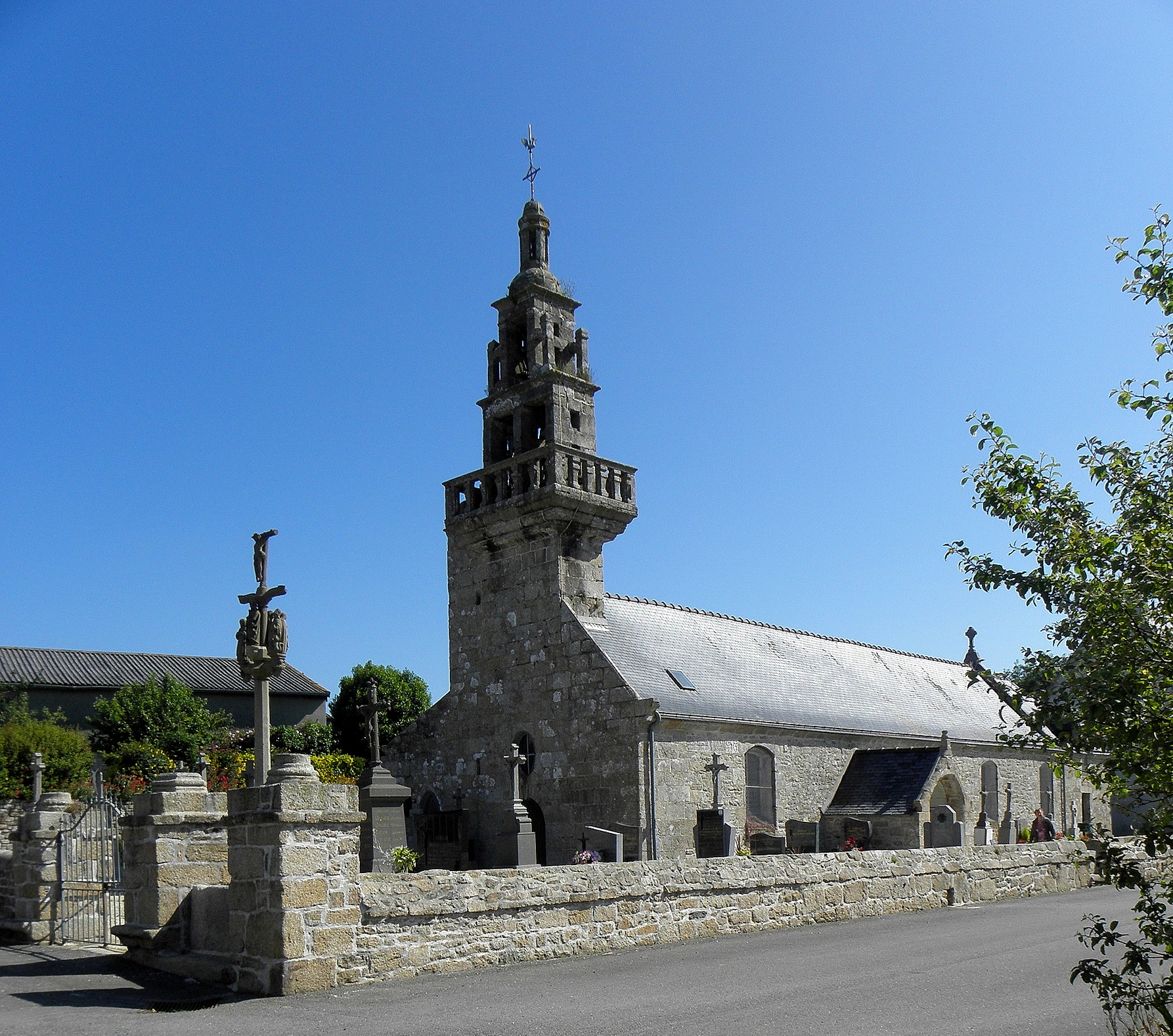
- The parish church and the calvary, in Loc-Brévalaire

- Coat of arms
- Location of Loc-Brévalaire
- Location within France Location within Brittany
- Coordinates: 48°33′19″N 4°24′11″W
- Country: France
- Region: Brittany
- Department: Finistère
- Arrondissement: Brest
- Canton: Lesneven

Government
  - Mayor (2020–2026): Philippe Le Polles
- Area^{1}: 1.67 km^{2} (0.64 sq mi)
- Highest elevation: 71 m (233 ft)
- Lowest elevation: 18 m (59 ft)
- Population (2023): 210
  - Density: 130/km^{2} (330/sq mi)
- Time zone: UTC+01:00 (CET)
  - Summer (DST): UTC+02:00 (CEST)
- INSEE/Postal code: 29126 /29260
- ^{1} French Land Register data, which excludes lakes, ponds, glaciers > 1 km^{2} (0.386 sq mi or 247 acres) and river estuaries.

Loc-Brévalaire (French pronunciation: [lɔk bʁevalɛʁ]; Breton: Loprevaler) is a commune in the Finistère department of Brittany in north-western France.

== Population ==
Inhabitants of Loc-Brévalaire are called in French Brévalairiens.

== See also ==
- Communes of the Finistère department
