= Saint-Méen =

Saint-Méen Sant-Neven
- Commune
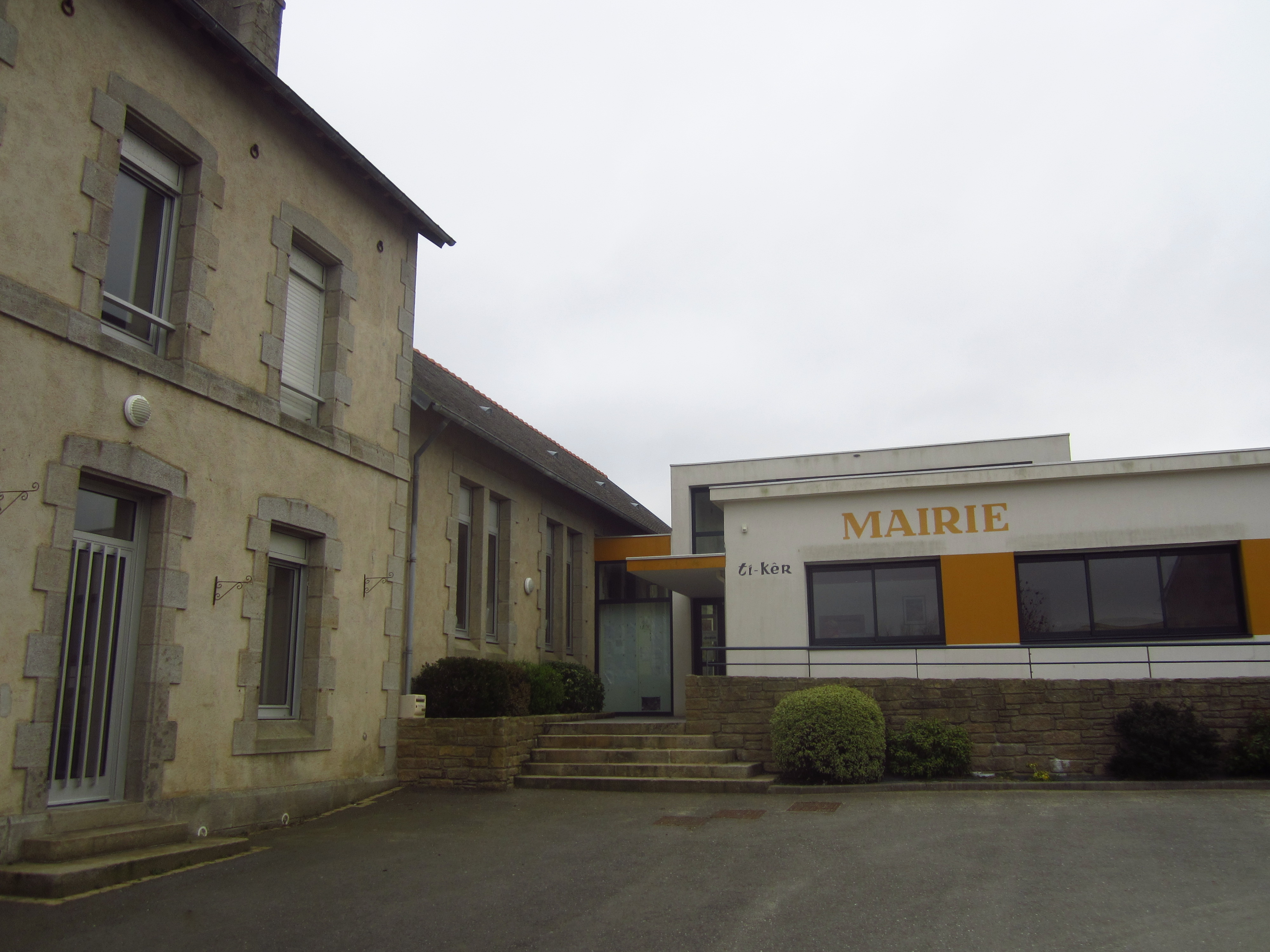
- The town hall in Saint-Méen

- Coat of arms
- Location of Saint-Méen
- Location within France Location within Brittany
- Coordinates: 48°33′42″N 4°15′48″W
- Country: France
- Region: Brittany
- Department: Finistère
- Arrondissement: Brest
- Canton: Lesneven
- Intercommunality: Lesneven Côte des Légendes

Government
  - Mayor (2020–2026): Louis Beaugendre
- Area^{1}: 11.74 km^{2} (4.53 sq mi)
- Highest elevation: 93 m (305 ft)
- Lowest elevation: 12 m (39 ft)
- Population (2023): 942
  - Density: 80.2/km^{2} (208/sq mi)
- Time zone: UTC+01:00 (CET)
  - Summer (DST): UTC+02:00 (CEST)
- INSEE/Postal code: 29255 /29260
- ^{1} French Land Register data, which excludes lakes, ponds, glaciers > 1 km^{2} (0.386 sq mi or 247 acres) and river estuaries.

Saint-Méen (Breton: Sant-Neven) is a commune in the Finistère department of Brittany in north-western France.

== Population ==
Historical population
Year	Pop.	±% p.a.
1968	537	—
1975	482	−1.53%
1982	446	−1.10%
1990	535	+2.30%
1999	533	−0.04%
2007	659	+2.69%
2012	849	+5.20%
2017	917	+1.55%
2023	942	+0.45%
Source: INSEE

Inhabitants of Saint-Méen are called in French Mévennais.

== See also ==
- Communes of the Finistère department
- Roland Doré sculptor. Sculptor of Saint-Méen calvary
