= Kerlouan =

Kerlouan Kerlouan
- Commune
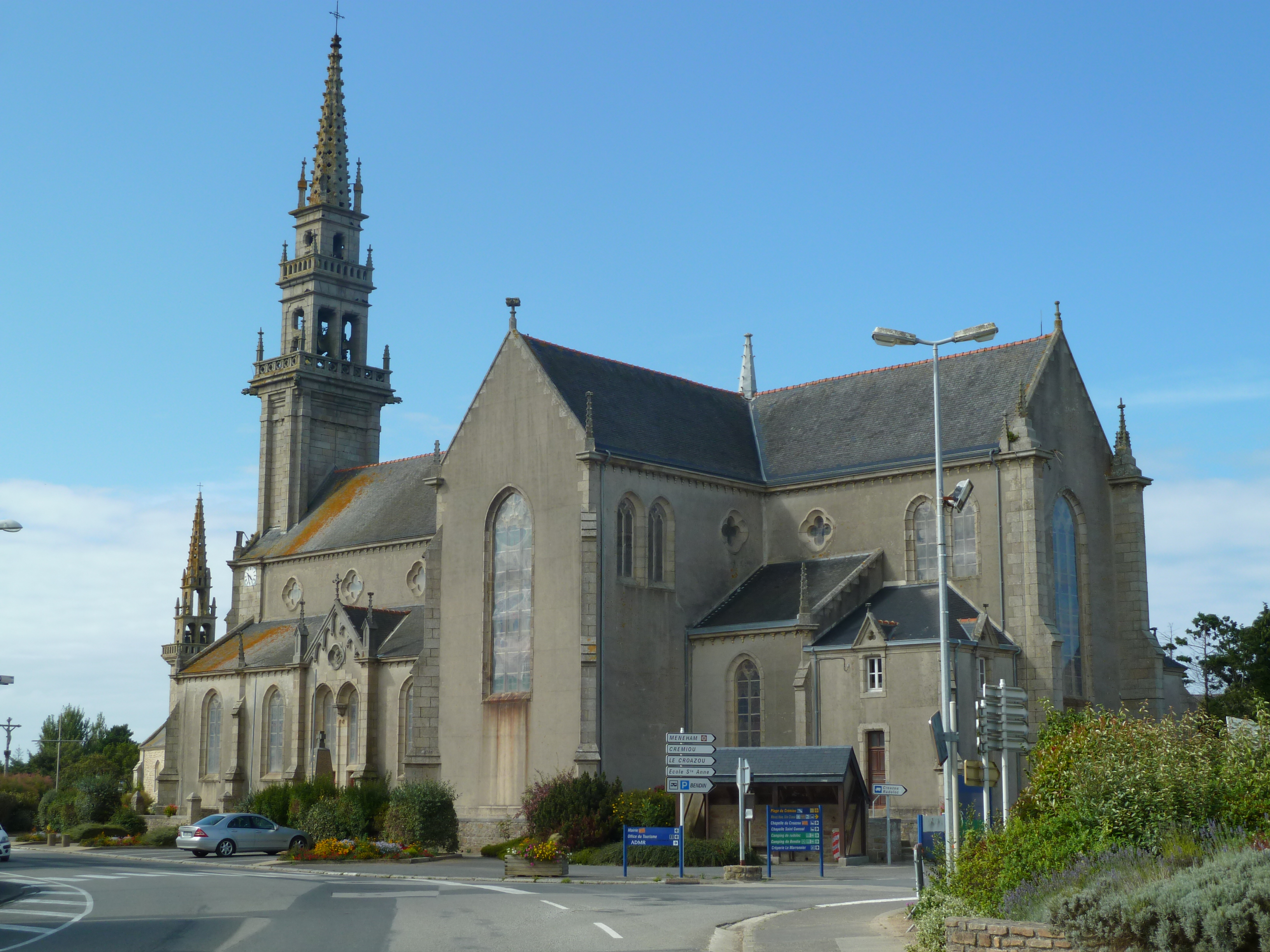
- The church of Saint-Brévalaire, in Kerlouan

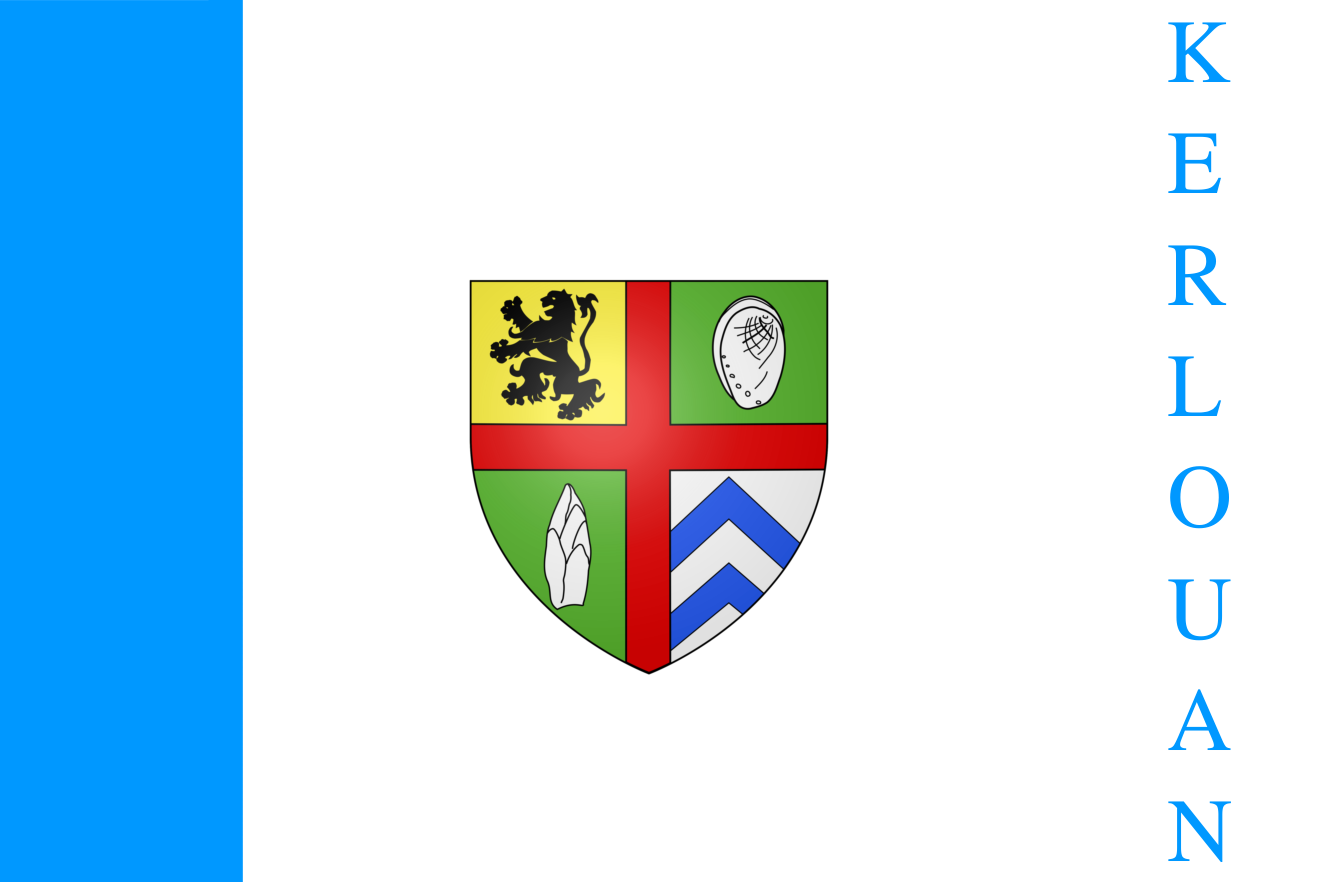
- Flag Coat of arms
- Location of Kerlouan
- Location within France Location within Brittany
- Coordinates: 48°38′46″N 4°21′52″W
- Country: France
- Region: Brittany
- Department: Finistère
- Arrondissement: Brest
- Canton: Lesneven
- Intercommunality: Lesneven Côte des Légendes

Government
  - Mayor (2020–2026): Christian Colliou
- Area^{1}: 17.80 km^{2} (6.87 sq mi)
- Highest elevation: 61 m (200 ft)
- Lowest elevation: 0 m (0 ft)
- Population (2023): 1,999
  - Density: 112.3/km^{2} (290.9/sq mi)
- Time zone: UTC+01:00 (CET)
  - Summer (DST): UTC+02:00 (CEST)
- INSEE/Postal code: 29091 /29890
- ^{1} French Land Register data, which excludes lakes, ponds, glaciers > 1 km^{2} (0.386 sq mi or 247 acres) and river estuaries.

Kerlouan (French pronunciation: [kɛʁluɑ̃]; Breton: Kerlouan) is a commune in the Finistère department of Brittany in northwestern France not far from Brest. It also contains the village of Meneham.

== Population ==
Inhabitants of Kerlouan are called in French Kerlouanais.

Historical population
Year	Pop.	±% p.a.
1968	2,693	—
1975	2,656	−0.20%
1982	2,572	−0.46%
1990	2,406	−0.83%
1999	2,238	−0.80%
2007	2,258	+0.11%
2012	2,229	−0.26%
2017	2,119	−1.01%
2023	1,999	−0.97%
Source: INSEE

== Fishing hamlet of Meneham ==
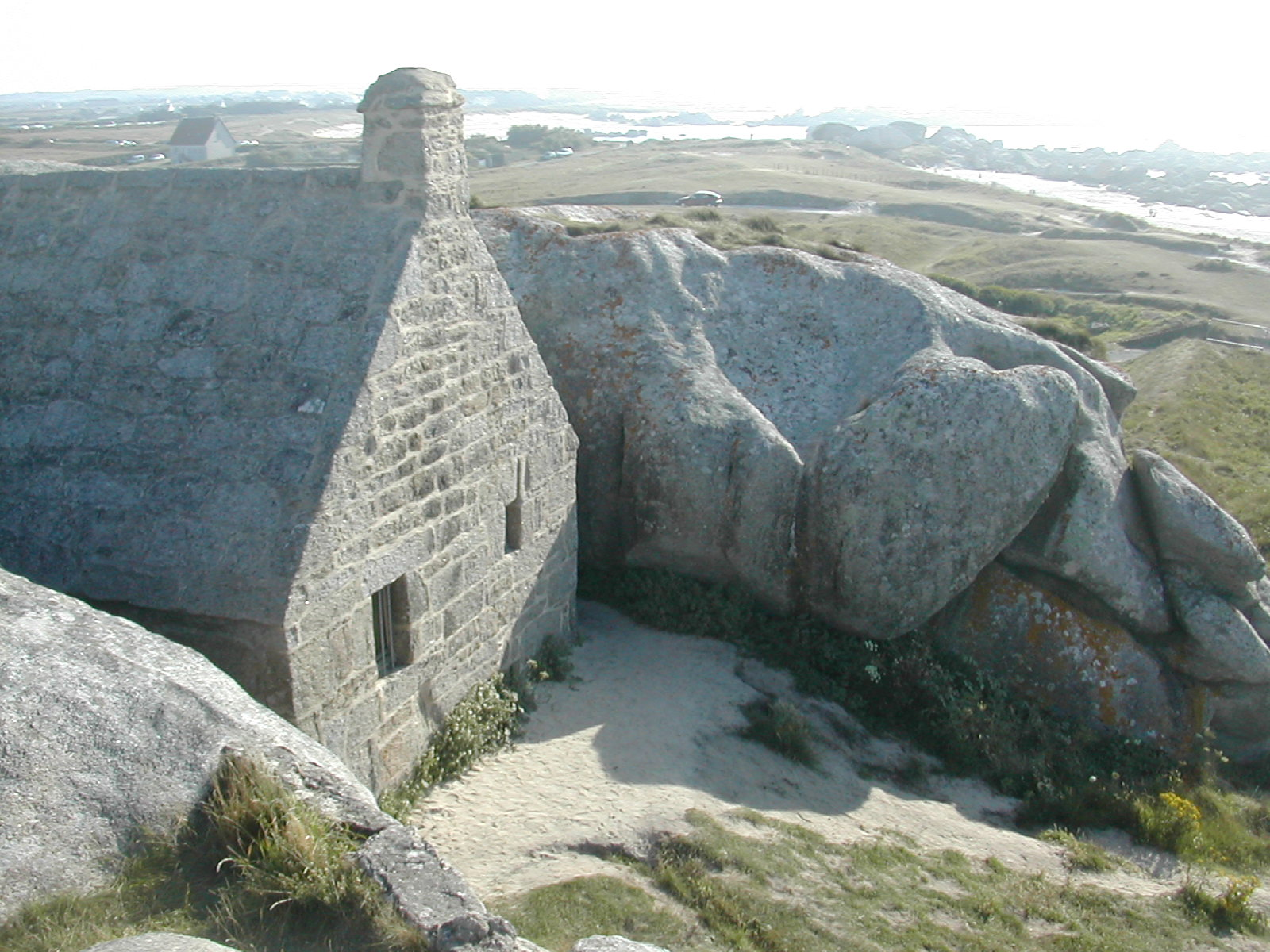
Meneham

The village of Meneham, locate in Pagan county (Bro bagan), was initially built as a lookout post in the 17th century by Vauban. The main building has the distinction of having a stone roof. The inhabitants came to steal the wood used for the fire.

The lookout is built around many huge granite rocks. This village is almost deserted and in disrepair in the 1990s. A rehabilitation operation was then initiated in 2004.

== Sights ==
- Kerlouan transmitter, for transmitting orders to submerged submarines in VLF-range
- The coast is another great point of interest, as are the beaches of "Boutrouille" and "Le Fanal", and for climbers the "île aux vaches"

== See also ==
- Communes of the Finistère department
- Yann Larhantec
