= Guissény =

Guissény Gwiseni
- Commune
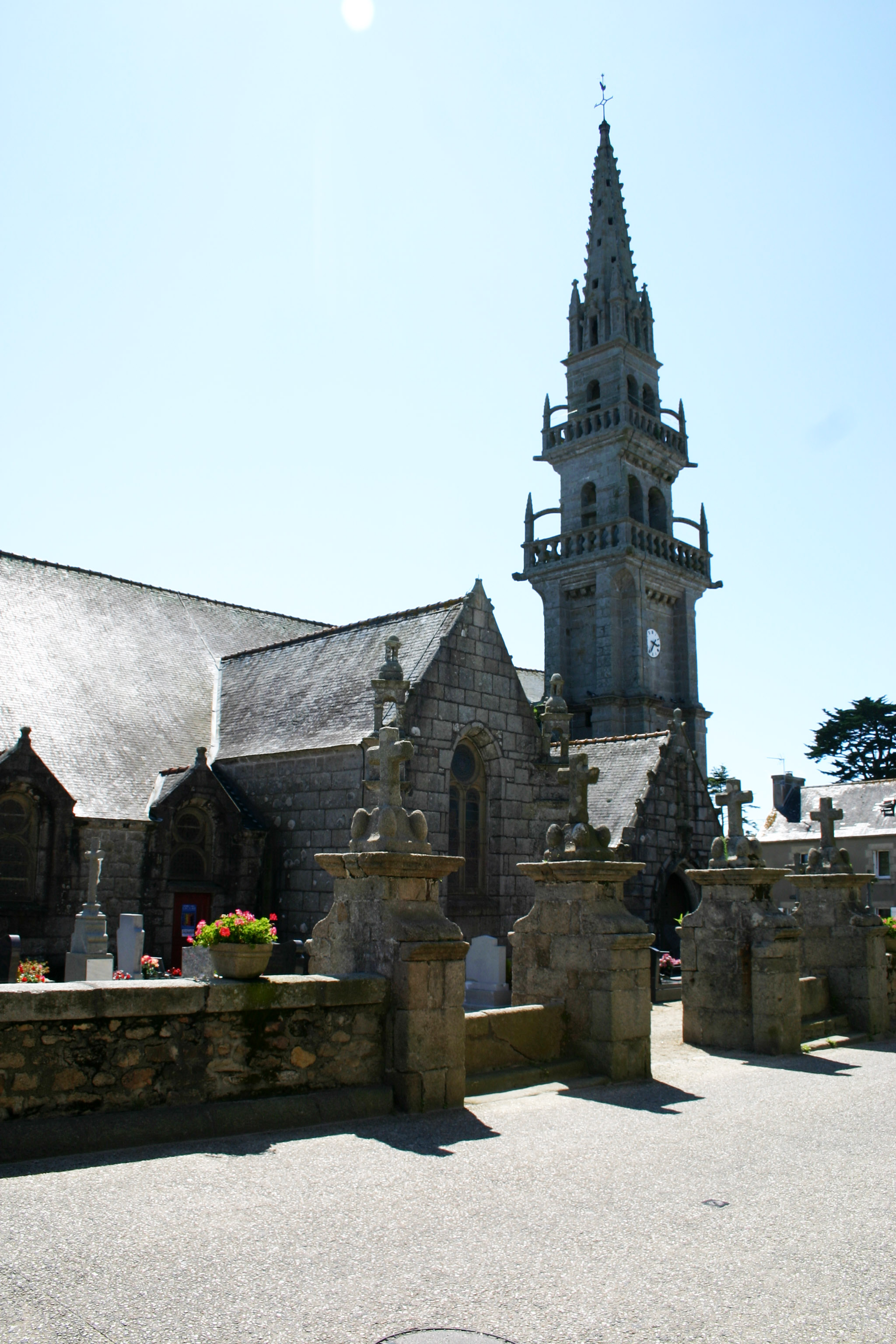
- The church in Guissény

- Coat of arms
- Location of Guissény
- Location within France Location within Brittany
- Coordinates: 48°38′05″N 4°24′27″W
- Country: France
- Region: Brittany
- Department: Finistère
- Arrondissement: Brest
- Canton: Lesneven
- Intercommunality: Lesneven Côte des Légendes

Government
  - Mayor (2020–2026): Raphaël Rapin
- Area^{1}: 25.18 km^{2} (9.72 sq mi)
- Highest elevation: 77 m (253 ft)
- Lowest elevation: 0 m (0 ft)
- Population (2023): 1,979
  - Density: 78.59/km^{2} (203.6/sq mi)
- Time zone: UTC+01:00 (CET)
  - Summer (DST): UTC+02:00 (CEST)
- INSEE/Postal code: 29077 /29880
- ^{1} French Land Register data, which excludes lakes, ponds, glaciers > 1 km^{2} (0.386 sq mi or 247 acres) and river estuaries.

Guissény (French pronunciation: [ɡiseni]; Breton: Gwiseni) is a commune in the Finistère department of Brittany in north-western France.

== Geography ==
Guissény is a coastal town on the English Channel that is part of the "pays Pagan". It is limited to the northeast by a marine gulf, the gulf (or cove) of Tressény, into which flows a small coastal river, the Quillimadec, which separates it from Kerlouan. To the west, it is limited by the Porz Olier (its eastern tip containing Dibennou and its western Beg ar Skeïz), a small residual marine gulf that was once much larger. Most of the gulf has been transformed into a polder (La Palud de Curnic, where salt marshes once existed) or pond (Étang du Curnic) due to the construction of a dyke that separates Guissény from Plouguerneau. Guissény extends westward to include a good part of the beach of Vougo - the other part being in Plouguerneau - where the coastal dunes reach an altitude of up to 13 meters at a place called "la Sècherie".

To the west of Curnic, the coastal platform is several hundred meters wide and includes a number of emerged rocky islets: Karreg Hir (the Karreg Hir causeway extends northwest to the rocks of Lizenn Du and includes numerous islets emerging at low tide), Golhédoc, Énez Du, Tilloc, and Énez Croaz-Hent (the latter now being linked to the mainland by a dyke).

== Population ==
The inhabitants of Guissény are called Guisséniens in French.

Historical population
Year	Pop.	±% p.a.
1968	2,104	—
1975	1,948	−1.09%
1982	1,887	−0.45%
1990	1,850	−0.25%
1999	1,783	−0.41%
2007	1,823	+0.28%
2012	2,033	+2.20%
2017	2,009	−0.24%
2023	1,979	−0.25%
Source: INSEE

== Breton language ==
In 2009, 21.55% of primary-school children attended bilingual schools, where Breton language is taught alongside French.

== Sights ==
- The parish church of Saint-Sezny and its churchyard: the interior of the churchyard contains all the traditional elements: the church surrounded by the cemetery, the former ossuary which became the Chapel of the Immaculate Conception (rebuilt in 1743 and restored in 1854), and two calvaries. The current church was rebuilt in 1721, with the exception of the two porches, which date from 1637 (south porch) and 1735 (north porch).
- The Chapel of Our Lady of Brendaouez, rebuilt in 1874.
- There are 45 crosses and calvaries within the territory of the municipality of Guissény.
- The guardhouse, built at the end of the 17th or beginning of the 18th century.
- The seaweed kiln and the seaweed harvester's shelter at Enez-Croaz-Hent.

== See also ==
- Communes of the Finistère department
- List of the works of Bastien and Henry Prigent
