= Plouider =

Plouider Plouider
- Commune
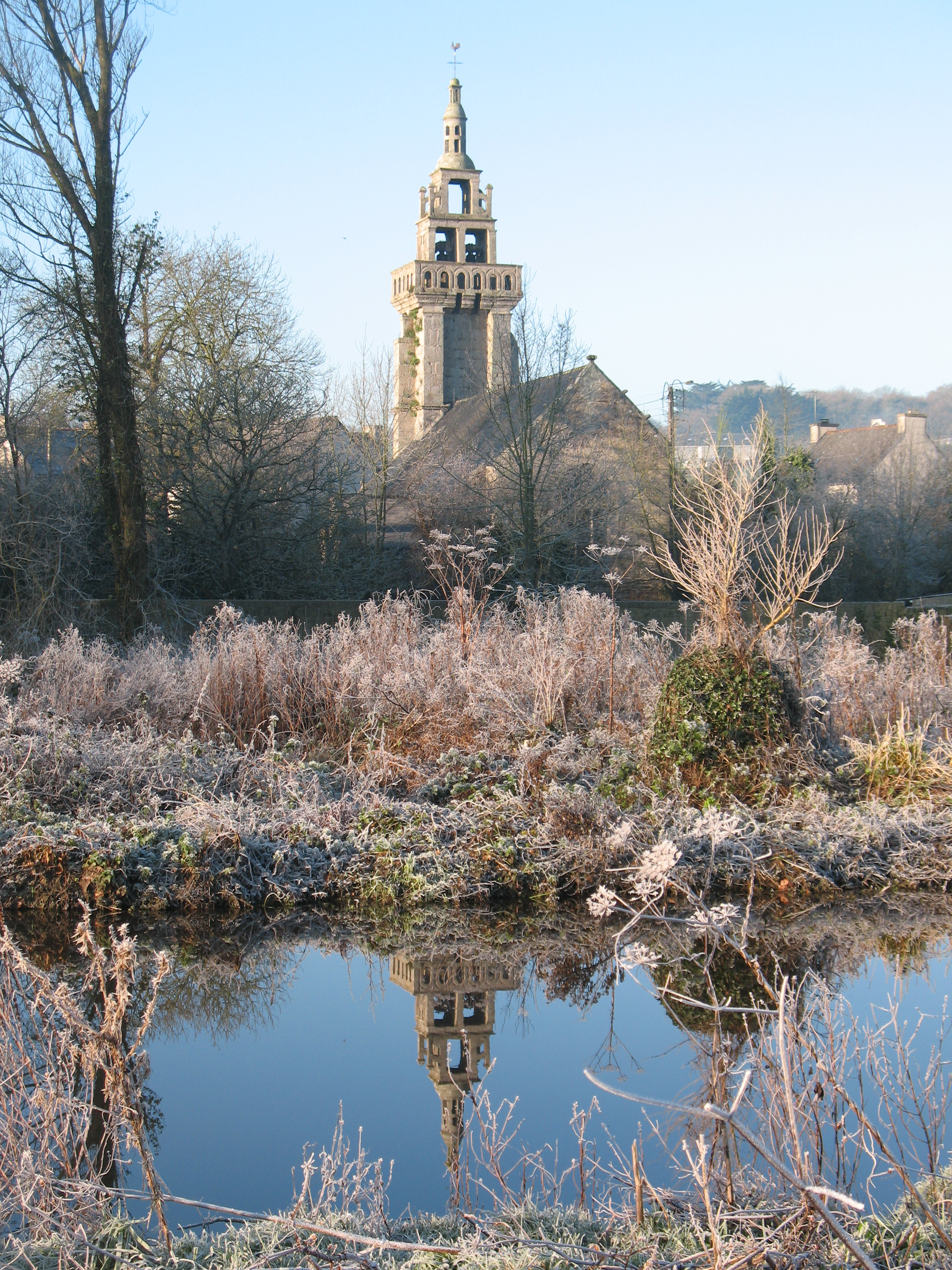
- The Chapel of Saint-Fiacre at Pont-du-Châtel, in Plouider

- Coat of arms
- Location of Plouider
- Location within France Location within Brittany
- Coordinates: 48°36′32″N 4°17′48″W
- Country: France
- Region: Brittany
- Department: Finistère
- Arrondissement: Brest
- Canton: Lesneven
- Intercommunality: Lesneven Côte des Légendes

Government
  - Mayor (2020–2026): René Paugam
- Area^{1}: 23.63 km^{2} (9.12 sq mi)
- Highest elevation: 86 m (282 ft)
- Lowest elevation: 2 m (6.6 ft)
- Population (2023): 1,809
  - Density: 76.56/km^{2} (198.3/sq mi)
- Time zone: UTC+01:00 (CET)
  - Summer (DST): UTC+02:00 (CEST)
- INSEE/Postal code: 29198 /29260
- ^{1} French Land Register data, which excludes lakes, ponds, glaciers > 1 km^{2} (0.386 sq mi or 247 acres) and river estuaries.

Plouider (French pronunciation: [pluidɛʁ]; Breton: Plouider) is a commune in the Finistère department of Brittany in north-western France.

== Population ==
Inhabitants of Plouider are called in French Plouidérois.

== See also ==
- Communes of the Finistère department
