= Saint-Frégant =

Saint-Frégant Sant-Fregan
- Commune
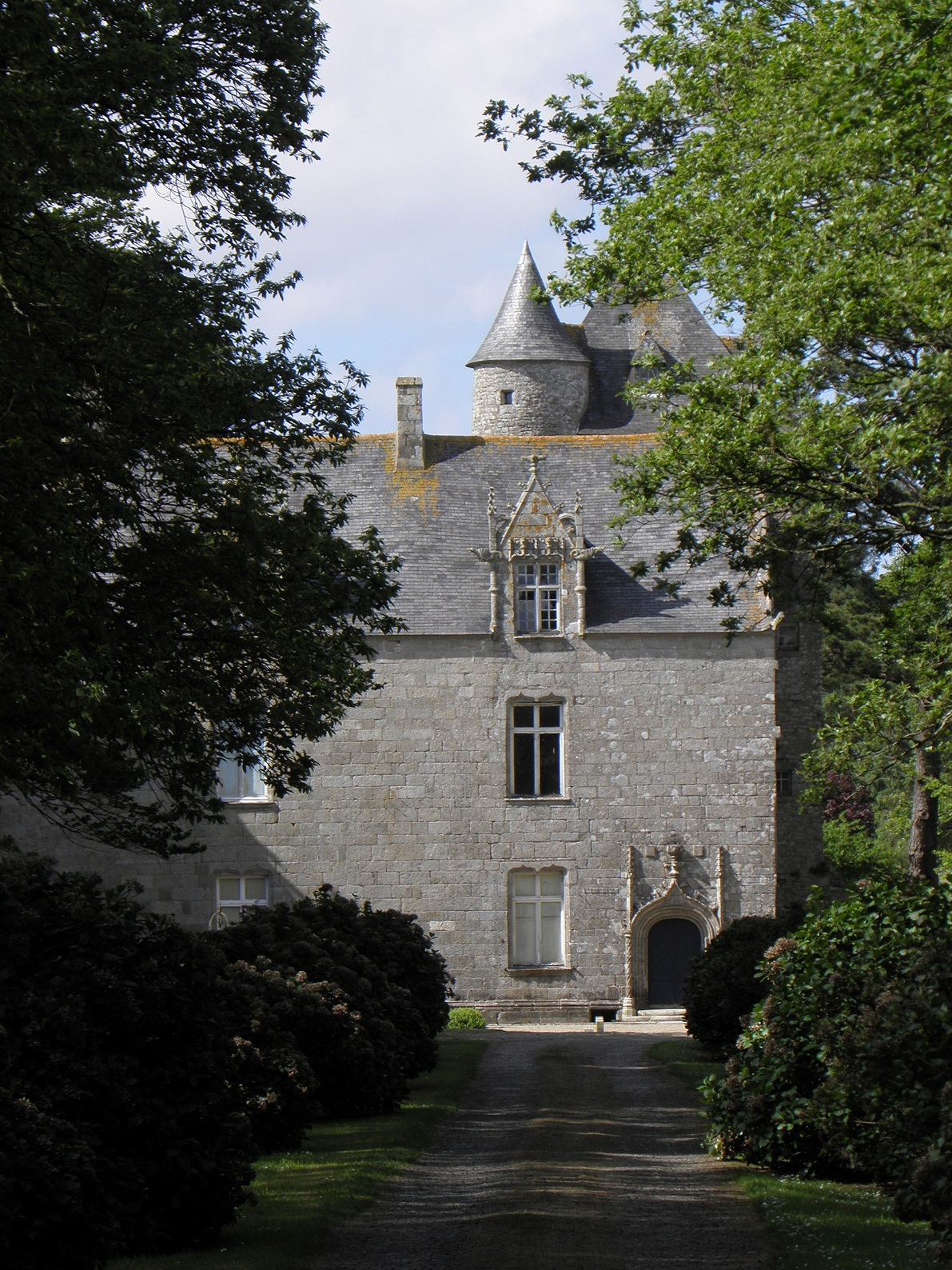
- The Château de Penmarc'h, in Saint-Frégant
- Location of Saint-Frégant
- Location within France Location within Brittany
- Coordinates: 48°36′14″N 4°22′00″W
- Country: France
- Region: Brittany
- Department: Finistère
- Arrondissement: Brest
- Canton: Lesneven
- Intercommunality: Lesneven Côte des Légendes

Government
  - Mayor (2020–2026): Cécile Galliou
- Area^{1}: 8.41 km^{2} (3.25 sq mi)
- Highest elevation: 76 m (249 ft)
- Lowest elevation: 7 m (23 ft)
- Population (2023): 874
  - Density: 104/km^{2} (269/sq mi)
- Time zone: UTC+01:00 (CET)
  - Summer (DST): UTC+02:00 (CEST)
- INSEE/Postal code: 29248 /29260
- ^{1} French Land Register data, which excludes lakes, ponds, glaciers > 1 km^{2} (0.386 sq mi or 247 acres) and river estuaries.

Saint-Frégant (French pronunciation: [sɛ̃ fʁeɡɑ̃]; Breton: Sant-Fregan) is a commune in the Finistère department of Brittany in north-western France.

== Population ==
Inhabitants of Saint-Frégant are called in French Frégantais.

== See also ==
- Communes of the Finistère department
