= Plouguerneau =

Commune in France

Plouguerneau Plougerne
- Commune
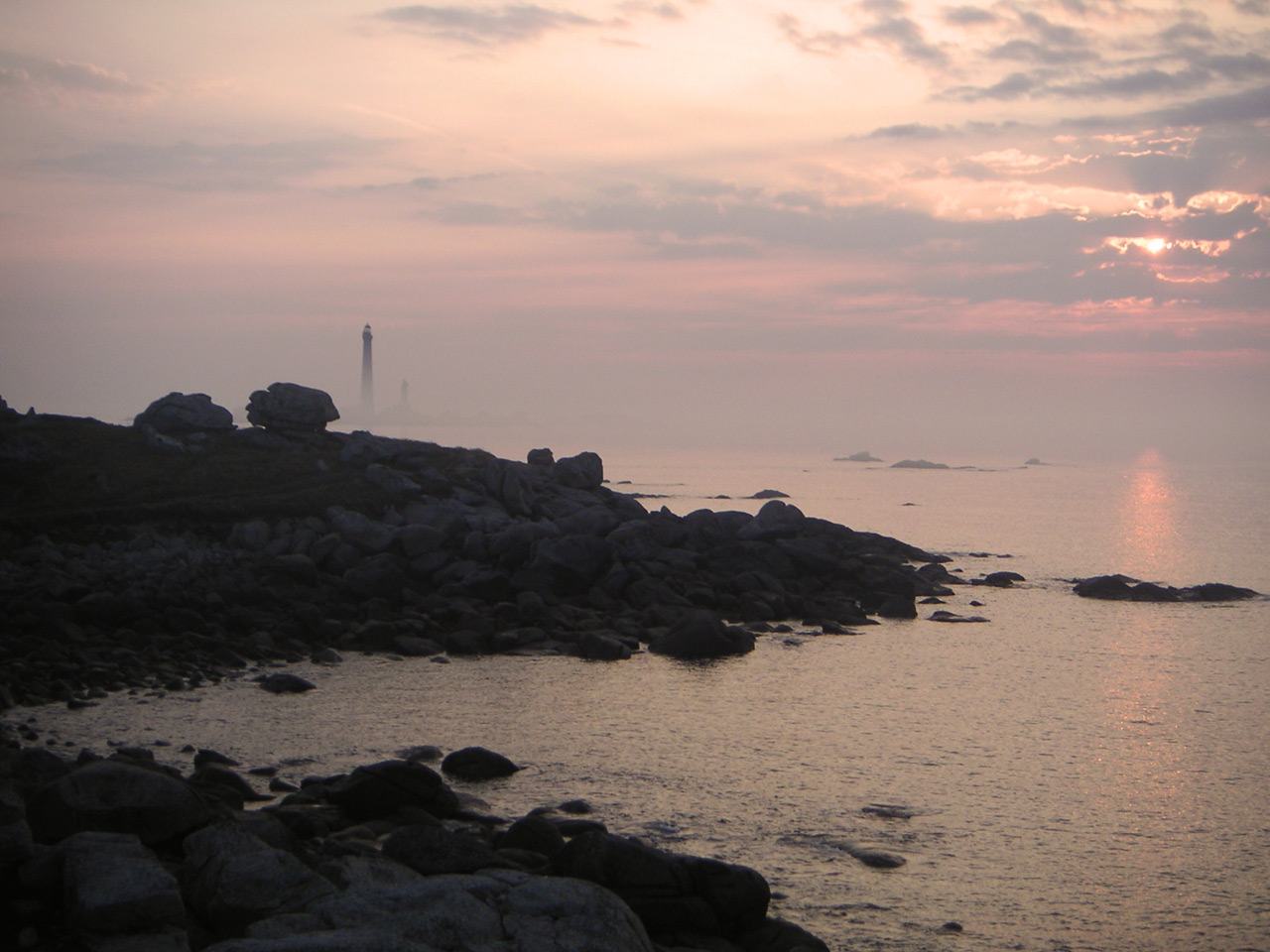
- Sunset at Plouguerneau

- Coat of arms
- Location of Plouguerneau
- Location within France Location within Brittany
- Coordinates: 48°36′28″N 4°30′15″W
- Country: France
- Region: Brittany
- Department: Finistère
- Arrondissement: Brest
- Canton: Lesneven

Government
  - Mayor (2020–2026): Yannig Robin
- Area^{1}: 43.33 km^{2} (16.73 sq mi)
- Highest elevation: 79 m (259 ft)
- Lowest elevation: 0 m (0 ft)
- Population (2023): 6,755
  - Density: 155.9/km^{2} (403.8/sq mi)
- Time zone: UTC+01:00 (CET)
  - Summer (DST): UTC+02:00 (CEST)
- INSEE/Postal code: 29195 /29880
- ^{1} French Land Register data, which excludes lakes, ponds, glaciers > 1 km^{2} (0.386 sq mi or 247 acres) and river estuaries.

Plouguerneau (French pronunciation: [pluɡɛʁno]; Breton: Plougerne) is a commune in the Finistère department of Brittany in north-western France.

== Geography ==
A municipality located between the right bank of the coastal river Aber-Wrac'h and the English Channel, Plouguerneau is made up of three towns: Plouguerneau in the center of the municipality, Lilia to the west facing the sea and Le Grouanec to the east facing land. It is located in the heart of the Pays pagan and the Pays des Abers.

Plouguerneau has 45 kilometers of coastline, islands included (it is the town in France with the longest coastline); it is also the capital of seaweed harvesters.

== International relations ==
- (European Union) Edingen-Neckarhausen

Since 14 July 1967 the commune has been twinned with Neckarhausen, and from 1975 Edingen-Neckarhausen, in Baden-Württemberg. Considered one of the most exemplary twinnings between French and German communities, it earned Plouguerneau the 1990 Europe Prize, awarded by the Council of Europe.

The commune is twinned with a number of villages in South East Cornwall, England, including:

- (United Kingdom) St Germans, UK
- (United Kingdom) Tideford, UK

== Population ==
Inhabitants of Plouguerneau are called in French Plouguernéens.

Historical population

Year	Pop.	±% p.a.
1793	3,367	—
1800	3,725	+1.45%
1806	5,168	+5.61%
1821	5,518	+0.44%
1831	5,546	+0.05%
1836	5,550	+0.01%
1841	5,311	−0.88%
1846	5,902	+2.13%
1851	6,246	+1.14%
1856	5,922	−1.06%
1861	5,868	−0.18%
1866	6,033	+0.56%
1872	5,778	−0.72%
1876	5,951	+0.74%
1881	5,852	−0.33%
1886	5,832	−0.07%
1891	5,724	−0.37%
1896	5,603	−0.43%
1901	5,631	+0.10%

Year	Pop.	±% p.a.
1906	5,824	+0.68%
1911	5,826	+0.01%
1921	5,688	−0.24%
1926	5,784	+0.34%
1931	5,937	+0.52%
1936	5,782	−0.53%
1946	6,180	+0.67%
1954	6,010	−0.35%
1962	6,066	+0.12%
1968	5,750	−0.89%
1975	5,467	−0.72%
1982	5,317	−0.40%
1990	5,255	−0.15%
1999	5,628	+0.76%
2007	6,162	+1.14%
2012	6,352	+0.61%
2017	6,607	+0.79%
2023	6,755	+0.37%

Source: EHESS and INSEE (1968-2023)

== Breton language ==
In 2008, 12.52% of primary-school children attended bilingual schools, where Breton language is taught alongside French.

== See also ==
- Communes of the Finistère department
