= Lesneven =

- Commune
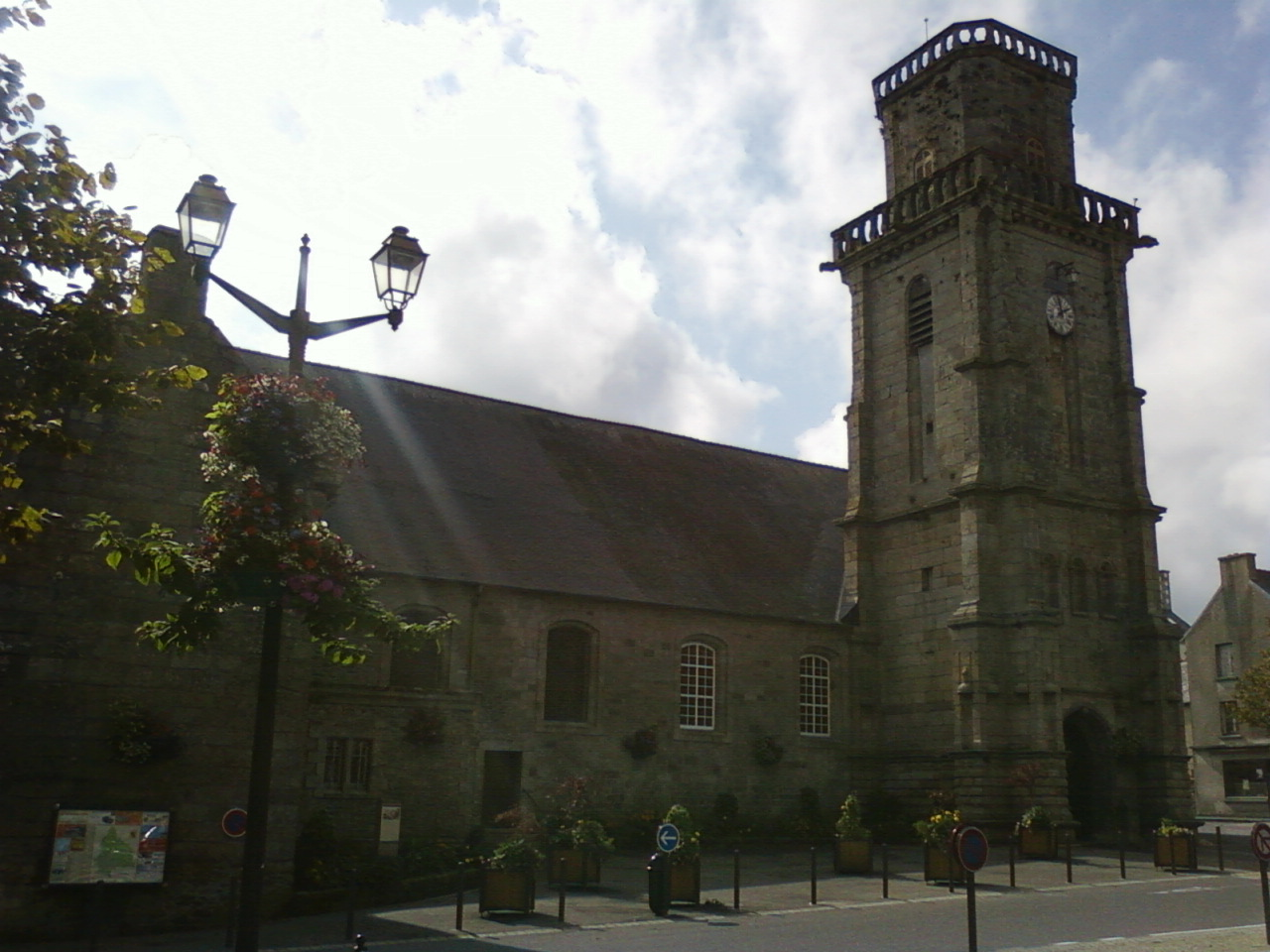
- The church of Saint-Michel, in Lesneven

- Coat of arms
- Location of Lesneven
- Location within France Location within Brittany
- Coordinates: 48°34′20″N 4°18′53″W
- Country: France
- Region: Brittany
- Department: Finistère
- Arrondissement: Brest
- Canton: Lesneven
- Intercommunality: Lesneven Côte des Légendes

Government
  - Mayor (2020–2026): Claudie Balcon
- Area^{1}: 10.27 km^{2} (3.97 sq mi)
- Highest elevation: 79 m (259 ft)
- Lowest elevation: 14 m (46 ft)
- Population (2023): 7,566
  - Density: 736.7/km^{2} (1,908/sq mi)
- Time zone: UTC+01:00 (CET)
  - Summer (DST): UTC+02:00 (CEST)
- INSEE/Postal code: 29124 /29260
- Website: www.lesneven.bzh
- ^{1} French Land Register data, which excludes lakes, ponds, glaciers > 1 km^{2} (0.386 sq mi or 247 acres) and river estuaries.

Lesneven (French pronunciation: [lɛsnəvɛ̃]; Breton: Lesneven) is a commune in the Finistère department of Brittany in northwestern France.

It lies 24 kilometres (15 miles) northeast of Brest, about 12 km (7 miles) from the English Channel in the middle of the Leon plateau.

== History ==
Lesneven has its origins in the immigration from southwest Britain in the fifth and sixth centuries, and the name (Les-an-Even) means "court of Even" in Common Brittonic (Llys-Ifan in Welsh) after an alleged military leader of that period. Lesneven was the castle-town controlling Léon during the Middle Ages. The castle is now gone, but many buildings of the 15th-18th centuries are still to be found in the centre. The Museum of Léon is here. The town now functions as a market and service centre for the surrounding rural district.

== Population ==
Inhabitants of Lesneven are known in French as Lesneviens.

Historical population

Year	Pop.	±% p.a.
1793	3,200	—
1800	1,860	−7.46%
1806	2,178	+2.67%
1821	2,314	+0.40%
1831	2,404	+0.38%
1836	2,664	+2.08%
1841	2,832	+1.23%
1846	2,847	+0.11%
1851	2,847	+0.00%
1856	2,663	−1.33%
1861	2,662	−0.01%
1866	2,759	+0.72%
1872	2,978	+1.28%
1876	2,905	−0.62%
1881	2,950	+0.31%
1886	3,028	+0.52%
1891	3,284	+1.64%
1896	3,488	+1.21%
1901	3,496	+0.05%

Year	Pop.	±% p.a.
1906	3,375	−0.70%
1911	3,776	+2.27%
1921	3,899	+0.32%
1926	3,969	+0.36%
1931	4,111	+0.71%
1936	4,300	+0.90%
1946	4,825	+1.16%
1954	5,181	+0.89%
1962	5,071	−0.27%
1968	5,626	+1.75%
1975	6,083	+1.12%
1982	6,145	+0.14%
1990	6,250	+0.21%
1999	6,348	+0.17%
2007	6,740	+0.75%
2012	7,167	+1.24%
2017	7,311	+0.40%
2023	7,566	+0.57%

Source: EHESS and INSEE (1968-2023)

== Breton language ==
The municipality launched a linguistic plan concerning the Breton language through Ya d'ar brezhoneg 18 July 2007.

In 2008, 19.08 percent of primary-school children attended bilingual schools.

== International relations ==
Lesneven is twinned with:

- Kežmarok, Slovakia (friendship pact)
- Carmarthen, Wales
- (Galicia (Spain)) As Pontes de García Rodríguez, Spain.

== See also ==
- Kernouës
- Communes of the Finistère department
