= Le Folgoët =

Le Folgoët Ar Folgoad
- Commune
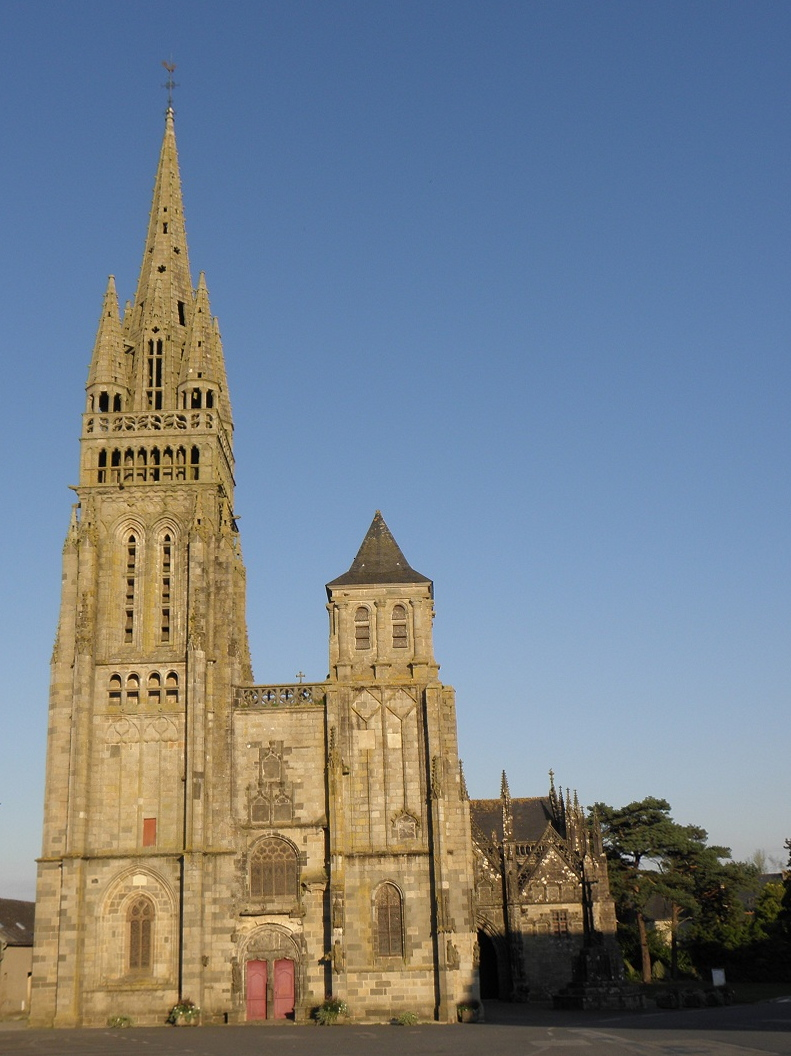
- The basilica of Notre-Dame du Folgoët

- Coat of arms
- Location of Le Folgoët
- Location within France Location within Brittany
- Coordinates: 48°33′45″N 4°20′03″W
- Country: France
- Region: Brittany
- Department: Finistère
- Arrondissement: Brest
- Canton: Lesneven
- Intercommunality: Lesneven Côte des Légendes

Government
  - Mayor (2020–2026): Pascal Kerboul
- Area^{1}: 9.77 km^{2} (3.77 sq mi)
- Highest elevation: 77 m (253 ft)
- Lowest elevation: 33 m (108 ft)
- Population (2023): 3,315
  - Density: 339/km^{2} (879/sq mi)
- Time zone: UTC+01:00 (CET)
  - Summer (DST): UTC+02:00 (CEST)
- INSEE/Postal code: 29055 /29260
- ^{1} French Land Register data, which excludes lakes, ponds, glaciers > 1 km^{2} (0.386 sq mi or 247 acres) and river estuaries.

Le Folgoët (French pronunciation: [lə fɔlɡwat]; Breton: Ar Folgoad) is a commune in the Finistère department and administrative region of Brittany in north-western France.

== Population ==
In French the inhabitants of Le Folgoët are known as Folgoëtiens.

Historical population
Year	Pop.	±% p.a.
1968	1,459	—
1975	2,220	+6.18%
1982	2,816	+3.46%
1990	3,094	+1.18%
1999	3,110	+0.06%
2007	3,037	−0.30%
2012	3,147	+0.71%
2017	3,187	+0.25%
2023	3,315	+0.66%
Source: INSEE

== See also ==
- Communes of the Finistère department
- List of the works of Bastien and Henry Prigent
- List of works of the two Folgoët ateliers
- List of the works of the Maître de Plougastel
