= Canton of Lesneven =

Coordinates: 48.57°N 4.32°W

The canton of Lesneven is an administrative division of the Finistère department, northwestern France. Its borders were modified at the French canton reorganisation which came into effect in March 2015. Its seat is in Lesneven.

It consists of the following communes:

1. Le Drennec
2. Le Folgoët
3. Goulven
4. Guissény
5. Kerlouan
6. Kernilis
7. Kernouës
8. Lanarvily
9. Lesneven
10. Loc-Brévalaire
11. Ploudaniel
12. Plouguerneau
13. Plouider
14. Plounéour-Brignogan-Plages
15. Saint-Frégant
16. Saint-Méen
17. Trégarantec
