= Trégarantec =

Trégarantec Tregaranteg
- Commune
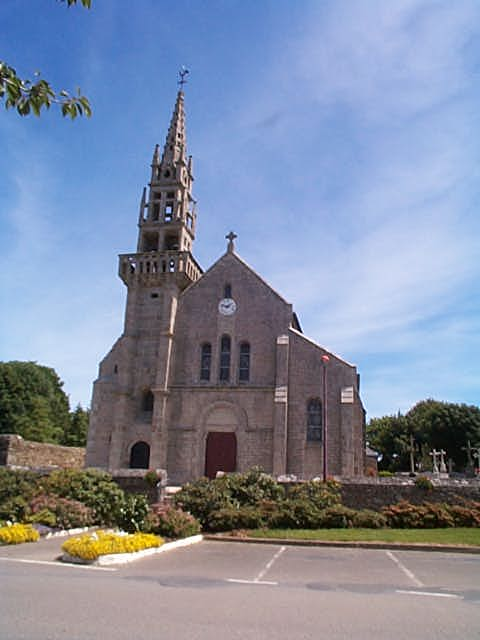
- The parish church of Saint-Théarnec

- Coat of arms
- Location of Trégarantec
- Location within France Location within Brittany
- Coordinates: 48°33′07″N 4°17′34″W
- Country: France
- Region: Brittany
- Department: Finistère
- Arrondissement: Brest
- Canton: Lesneven
- Intercommunality: Lesneven Côte des Légendes

Government
  - Mayor (2023–2026): Yann Toudic
- Area^{1}: 5.21 km^{2} (2.01 sq mi)
- Highest elevation: 87 m (285 ft)
- Lowest elevation: 32 m (105 ft)
- Population (2023): 634
  - Density: 122/km^{2} (315/sq mi)
- Time zone: UTC+01:00 (CET)
  - Summer (DST): UTC+02:00 (CEST)
- INSEE/Postal code: 29288 /29260
- ^{1} French Land Register data, which excludes lakes, ponds, glaciers > 1 km^{2} (0.386 sq mi or 247 acres) and river estuaries.

Trégarantec (French pronunciation: [tʁeɡaʁɑ̃tɛk]; Breton: Tregaranteg) is a commune in the Finistère department of Brittany in north-western France.

== Population ==
Inhabitants of Trégarantec are called in French Trégarantécois.

== See also ==
- Communes of the Finistère department
