= Landéda =

Landéda Landeda
- Commune
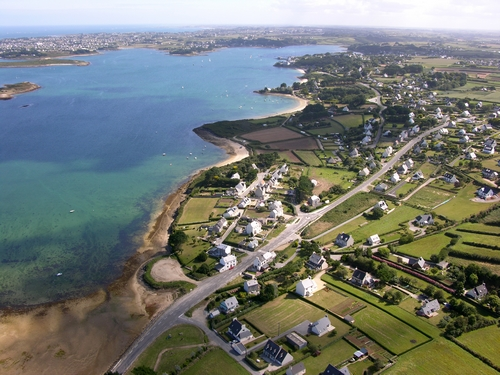
- An aerial view of Landéda

- Coat of arms
- Location of Landéda
- Location within France Location within Brittany
- Coordinates: 48°35′19″N 4°34′12″W
- Country: France
- Region: Brittany
- Department: Finistère
- Arrondissement: Brest
- Canton: Plabennec

Government
  - Mayor (2023–2026): David Kerlan
- Area^{1}: 10.98 km^{2} (4.24 sq mi)
- Highest elevation: 57 m (187 ft)
- Lowest elevation: 0 m (0 ft)
- Population (2023): 3,702
  - Density: 337.2/km^{2} (873.2/sq mi)
- Time zone: UTC+01:00 (CET)
  - Summer (DST): UTC+02:00 (CEST)
- INSEE/Postal code: 29101 /29870
- Website: www.landeda.fr
- ^{1} French Land Register data, which excludes lakes, ponds, glaciers > 1 km^{2} (0.386 sq mi or 247 acres) and river estuaries.

Landéda (French pronunciation: [lɑ̃deda]; Breton: Landeda) is a commune in the Finistère department of Brittany in north-western France.

== Geography ==
The coastal commune of Landéda forms a peninsula between two rias, the Aber Wrac'h to the north and the Aber-Benoît to the south.

== History ==
- 1790: commune established
- 1822: linked with the commune of Brouennou
- 1829: annexed the commune of Brouennou

== Population ==
Inhabitants of Landéda are called in French Landédaens.

Historical population

Year	Pop.	±% p.a.
1793	1,353	—
1800	1,311	−0.45%
1806	1,344	+0.42%
1821	1,398	+0.26%
1831	1,980	+3.54%
1836	2,093	+1.12%
1841	2,177	+0.79%
1846	2,068	−1.02%
1851	2,133	+0.62%
1856	2,135	+0.02%
1861	2,095	−0.38%
1866	2,159	+0.60%
1872	2,004	−1.23%
1876	2,066	+0.76%
1881	2,061	−0.05%
1886	2,057	−0.04%
1891	2,028	−0.28%
1896	2,043	+0.15%
1901	2,018	−0.25%

Year	Pop.	±% p.a.
1906	2,161	+1.38%
1911	2,227	+0.60%
1921	2,191	−0.16%
1926	2,215	+0.22%
1931	2,235	+0.18%
1936	2,191	−0.40%
1946	2,317	+0.56%
1954	2,329	+0.06%
1962	2,231	−0.54%
1968	2,136	−0.72%
1975	2,134	−0.01%
1982	2,281	+0.96%
1990	2,666	+1.97%
1999	2,949	+1.13%
2007	3,555	+2.36%
2012	3,606	+0.29%
2017	3,578	−0.16%
2023	3,702	+0.57%

Source: EHESS and INSEE (1968-2023)

== Sea rescue ==
Landeda is the base for the high-speed rescue motorboat located at the port of Aber Wrac'h. The rescue service is operated by volunteers. The rescue motorboat is named the President Joseph Oulhen, which is the name of a former manager of the service who died in service in 1986.

== Economy ==
The port of the Aber Wrac'h is within the territory of the commune. It includes a marina managed by the Chamber of Commerce and Industry of Brest.

== Sights ==
- Sainte-Marguerite chapel
- Troménec chapel
- Brouennou chapel

Other notable sights include an abbey, a manor, many stone crosses and islands with ancient ruins.

== Associations ==
- Oak Theatre Company
- Vrac'h Amateur Theatre

== See also ==
- Communes of the Finistère department
