= Lanarvily =

Lanarvily Lannarvili
- Commune
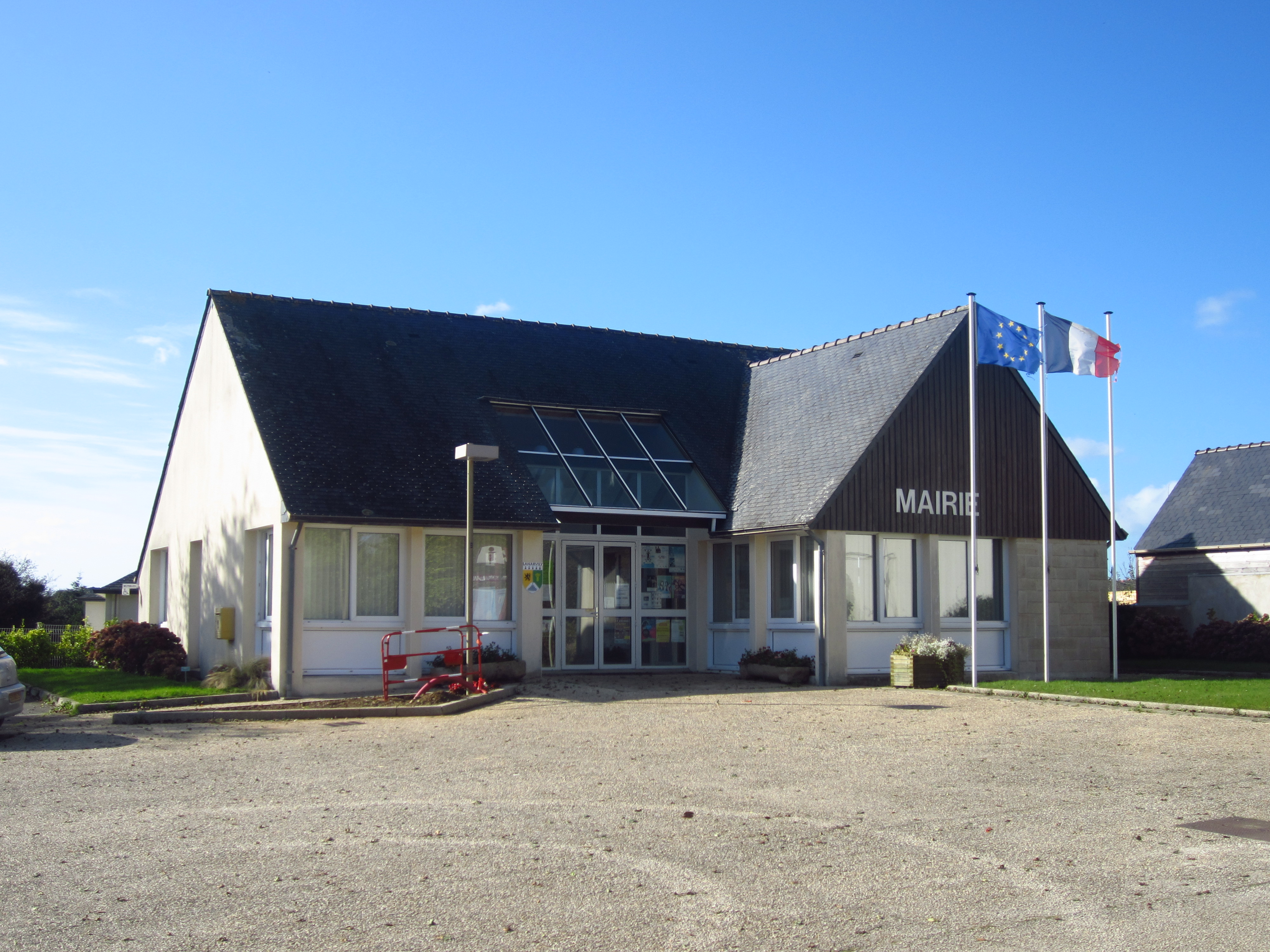
- The town hall in Lanarvily

- Coat of arms
- Location of Lanarvily
- Location within France Location within Brittany
- Coordinates: 48°33′11″N 4°23′12″W
- Country: France
- Region: Brittany
- Department: Finistère
- Arrondissement: Brest
- Canton: Lesneven
- Intercommunality: Lesneven Côte des Légendes

Government
  - Mayor (2020–2026): Xavier Franques
- Area^{1}: 5.92 km^{2} (2.29 sq mi)
- Highest elevation: 71 m (233 ft)
- Lowest elevation: 18 m (59 ft)
- Population (2023): 401
  - Density: 67.7/km^{2} (175/sq mi)
- Time zone: UTC+01:00 (CET)
  - Summer (DST): UTC+02:00 (CEST)
- INSEE/Postal code: 29100 /29260
- ^{1} French Land Register data, which excludes lakes, ponds, glaciers > 1 km^{2} (0.386 sq mi or 247 acres) and river estuaries.

Lanarvily (French pronunciation: [lanaʁvili]; Breton: Lannarvili) is a commune in the Finistère department of Brittany in northwestern France.

== Population ==
Inhabitants of Lanarvily are called in French Lanarvilisiens.

== See also ==
- Communes of the Finistère department
