= Kernouës =

Kernouës Kernouez
- Commune
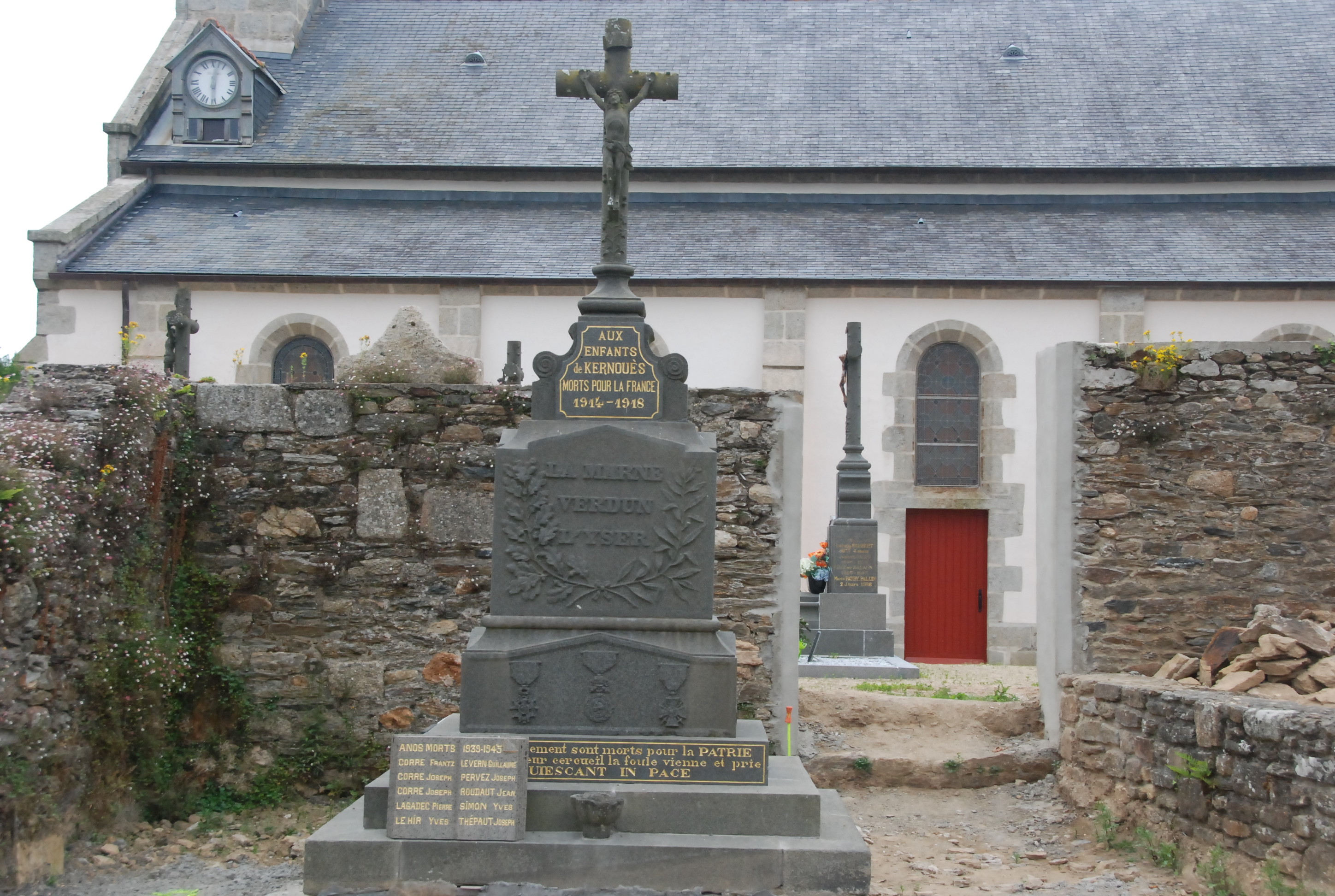
- The war memorial in Kernoués

- Coat of arms
- Location of Kernouës
- Location within France Location within Brittany
- Coordinates: 48°35′25″N 4°20′51″W
- Country: France
- Region: Brittany
- Department: Finistère
- Arrondissement: Brest
- Canton: Lesneven
- Intercommunality: Lesneven Côte des Légendes

Government
  - Mayor (2020–2026): Christophe Bele
- Area^{1}: 7.78 km^{2} (3.00 sq mi)
- Highest elevation: 70 m (230 ft)
- Lowest elevation: 7 m (23 ft)
- Population (2023): 665
  - Density: 85.5/km^{2} (221/sq mi)
- Time zone: UTC+01:00 (CET)
  - Summer (DST): UTC+02:00 (CEST)
- INSEE/Postal code: 29094 /29260
- ^{1} French Land Register data, which excludes lakes, ponds, glaciers > 1 km^{2} (0.386 sq mi or 247 acres) and river estuaries.

Kernouës (French pronunciation: [kɛʁnwɛs]; Breton: Kernouez) is a commune in the Finistère department of Brittany in northwestern France.

== Population ==
Inhabitants of Kernouës are called Kernouésiens in French.

== See also ==
- Communes of the Finistère department
