= Ploudaniel =

Ploudaniel Plouzeniel
- Commune
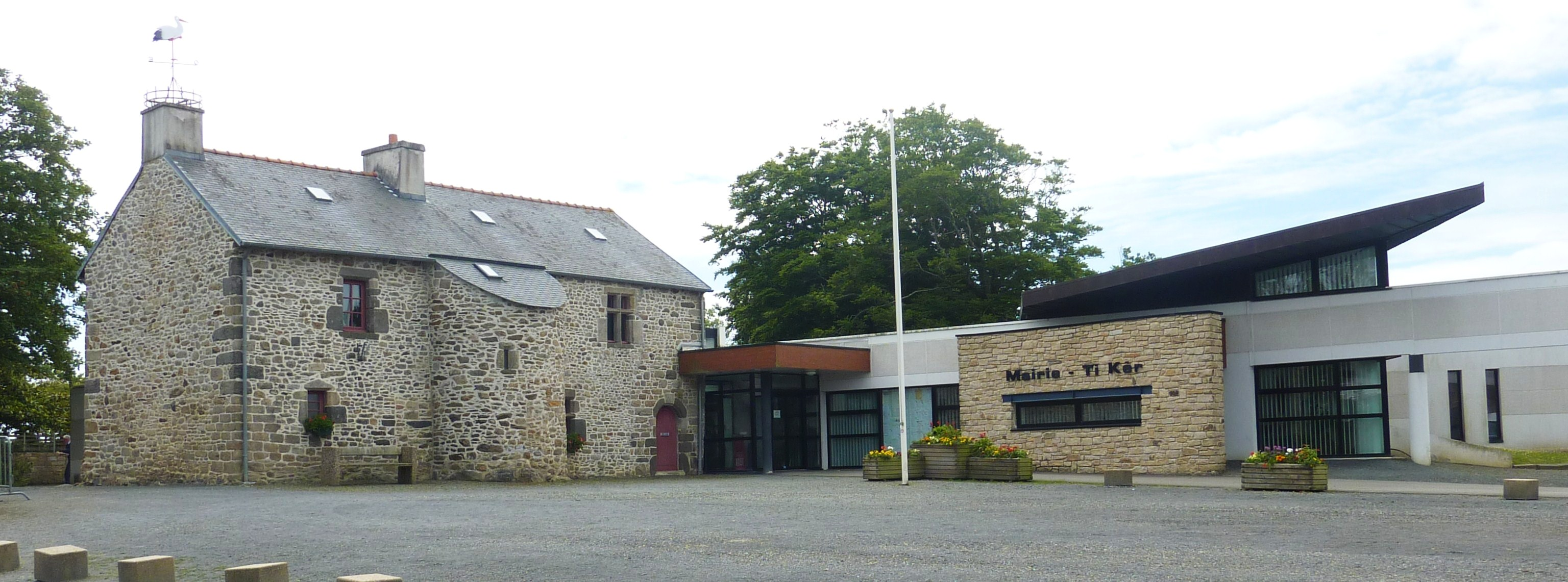
- The town hall in Ploudaniel

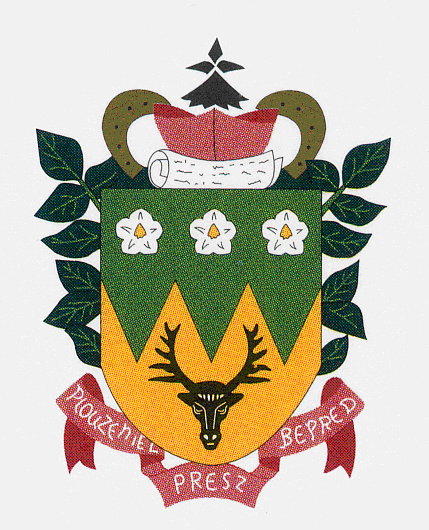
- Coat of arms
- Location of Ploudaniel
- Location within France Location within Brittany
- Coordinates: 48°32′15″N 4°18′37″W
- Country: France
- Region: Brittany
- Department: Finistère
- Arrondissement: Brest
- Canton: Lesneven
- Intercommunality: Lesneven Côte des Légendes

Government
  - Mayor (2020–2026): Pierre Guiziou
- Area^{1}: 46.28 km^{2} (17.87 sq mi)
- Highest elevation: 121 m (397 ft)
- Lowest elevation: 27 m (89 ft)
- Population (2023): 3,732
  - Density: 80.64/km^{2} (208.9/sq mi)
- Time zone: UTC+01:00 (CET)
  - Summer (DST): UTC+02:00 (CEST)
- INSEE/Postal code: 29179 /29260
- ^{1} French Land Register data, which excludes lakes, ponds, glaciers > 1 km^{2} (0.386 sq mi or 247 acres) and river estuaries.

Ploudaniel (French pronunciation: [pludanjɛl]; Breton: Plouzeniel) is a commune in the Finistère department of Brittany in north-western France.

== Geography ==
=== Climate ===
Ploudaniel has an oceanic climate (Köppen climate classification Cfb). The average annual temperature in Ploudaniel is 11.4 °C (52.5 °F). The average annual rainfall is 1,164.1 mm (45.83 in) with December as the wettest month. The temperatures are highest on average in August, at around 16.9 °C (62.4 °F), and lowest in January, at around 6.7 °C (44.1 °F). The highest temperature ever recorded in Ploudaniel was 39.6 °C (103.3 °F) on 18 July 2022; the coldest temperature ever recorded was −10.4 °C (13.3 °F) on 1 January 1997.

Climate data for Ploudaniel (1981–2010 averages, extremes 1982−present)
Month	Jan	Feb	Mar	Apr	May	Jun	Jul	Aug	Sep	Oct	Nov	Dec	Year
Record high °C (°F)	16.8 (62.2)	21.4 (70.5)	24.3 (75.7)	28.5 (83.3)	29.5 (85.1)	32.5 (90.5)	39.6 (103.3)	36.4 (97.5)	31.5 (88.7)	28.3 (82.9)	21.5 (70.7)	18.8 (65.8)	39.6 (103.3)
Mean daily maximum °C (°F)	9.5 (49.1)	9.9 (49.8)	12.0 (53.6)	13.7 (56.7)	16.8 (62.2)	19.3 (66.7)	21.4 (70.5)	21.5 (70.7)	19.7 (67.5)	16.3 (61.3)	12.4 (54.3)	10.1 (50.2)	15.2 (59.4)
Daily mean °C (°F)	6.7 (44.1)	6.7 (44.1)	8.3 (46.9)	9.5 (49.1)	12.5 (54.5)	14.9 (58.8)	16.9 (62.4)	16.9 (62.4)	15.1 (59.2)	12.5 (54.5)	9.3 (48.7)	7.2 (45.0)	11.4 (52.5)
Mean daily minimum °C (°F)	3.9 (39.0)	3.6 (38.5)	4.7 (40.5)	5.3 (41.5)	8.2 (46.8)	10.5 (50.9)	12.5 (54.5)	12.3 (54.1)	10.4 (50.7)	8.8 (47.8)	6.1 (43.0)	4.3 (39.7)	7.6 (45.7)
Record low °C (°F)	−10.4 (13.3)	−8.2 (17.2)	−4.5 (23.9)	−3.5 (25.7)	−1.1 (30.0)	1.6 (34.9)	4.1 (39.4)	3.7 (38.7)	1.5 (34.7)	−4.5 (23.9)	−4.6 (23.7)	−7.5 (18.5)	−10.4 (13.3)
Average precipitation mm (inches)	139.1 (5.48)	106.4 (4.19)	92.1 (3.63)	86.0 (3.39)	75.3 (2.96)	55.6 (2.19)	63.8 (2.51)	61.8 (2.43)	77.3 (3.04)	126.2 (4.97)	134.8 (5.31)	145.7 (5.74)	1,164.1 (45.83)
Average precipitation days (≥ 1.0 mm)	17.5	14.0	14.1	12.9	11.2	8.9	10.3	9.9	10.7	15.4	17.5	17.9	160.2
Source: Meteociel

== Population ==
Inhabitants of Ploudaniel are called in French Ploudaniélois.

Historical population
Year	Pop.	±% p.a.
1968	2,511	—
1975	2,558	+0.27%
1982	3,044	+2.52%
1990	3,406	+1.41%
1999	3,572	+0.53%
2007	3,666	+0.33%
2012	3,662	−0.02%
2017	3,709	+0.26%
2023	3,732	+0.10%
Source: INSEE

== Breton language ==
The municipality launched a linguistic plan through Ya d'ar brezhoneg on 2 February 2007.

== See also ==
- Communes of the Finistère department
- List of the works of the Maître de Guimiliau
- List of the works of the Maître de Thégonnec
