= List of the works of Bastien and Henry Prigent =

List of works of Bastien and Henry Prigent. The sculptors or "Ymageurs", Bastien and Henry Prigent ran a workshop (atelier) in Landerneau, Brittany, France from 1527 to 1577 and records show that at least fifty parishes passed orders to them, these parishes spread across the dioceses of Léon and Cornouaille plus of course Plougonven in Trégor. The atelier is known for the work on the monumental calvaries of Pleyben and Plougonven, on the porches at Pencran, Landivisiau, Guipavas and Lampaul-Guimiliau, several crosses and smaller calvaries and a gisant. For much of their work they used Kersantite, The listing below gives details of these works.

== The monumental calvaries ==
The Prigent atelier worked on the monumental calvaries at Plougonven see Calvary at Plougonven and Pleyben see Calvary at Pleyben. The Plougonven calvary was the first work to be inscribed with their names. An inscription reads "BASTIEN ET HENRY PRIGENT ESTOIET YMAGEURS 1554". The word "Ymageurs" was the description used for sculptors in this period in France. The Plougonven calvary is dedicated to Saint Yves and that at Pleyben to Saint Germain. The sculptor working in the Prigent atelier known as "Le compagnon de Pleyben" assisted the Prigents on parts of the Playben calvary.

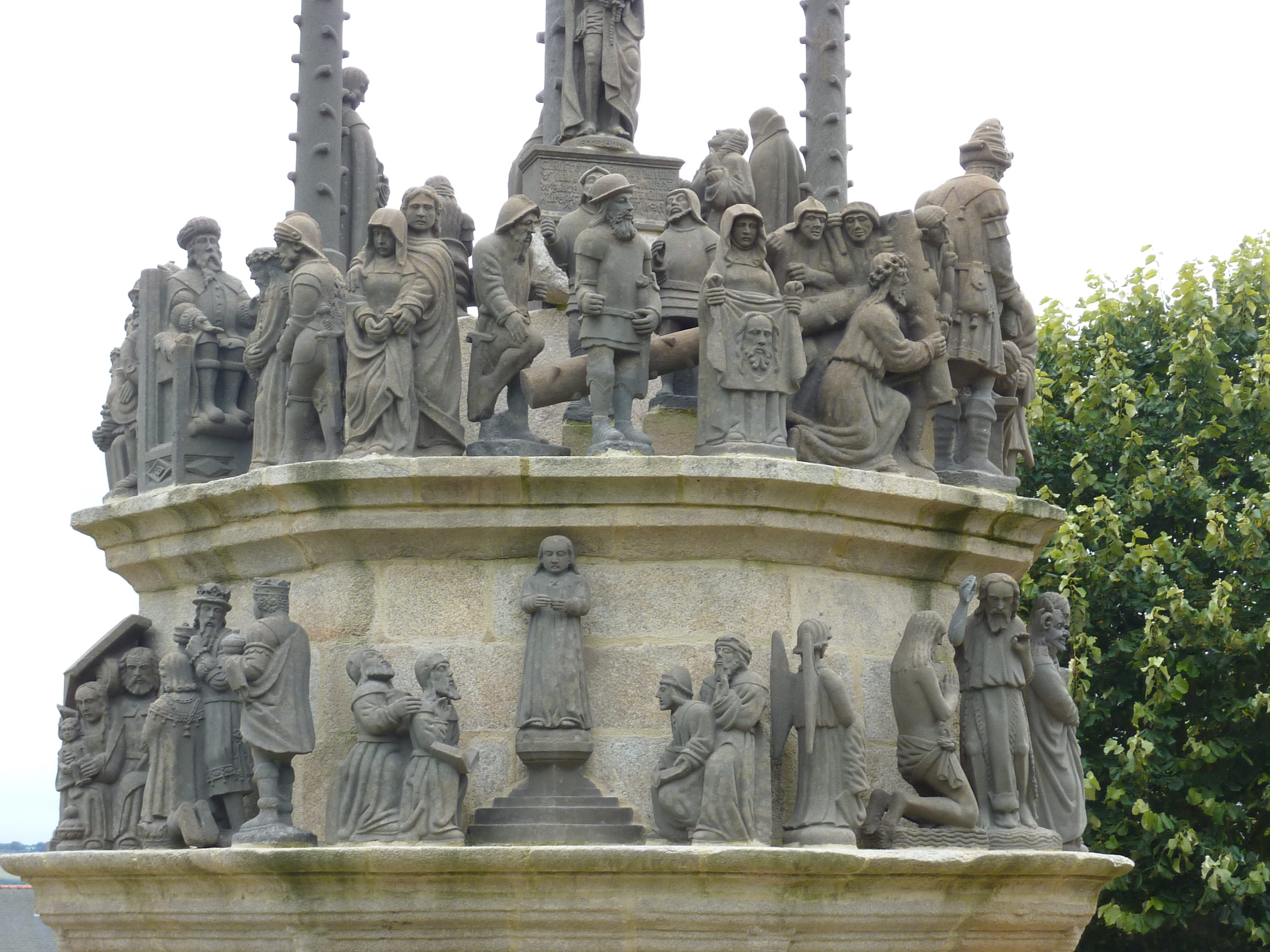
A view of part of the Plougonven calvary. On the upper level left, we see Jesus brought before Pontius Pilate by two guards. Pilate is sat on his throne. This is followed by the scene depicting Christ carrying the cross commencing with John the Evangelist supporting the Virgin Mary. On the corniche below and starting on the left side we have the Nativity and the Adoration of the Magi scenes then St Yves surrounded by a rich man and a poor man and finish on the right side with Jesus being baptized by John the Baptist watched by a kneeling angel who is carrying Jesus' robe. We finally catch the edge of the statue of Satan in the "temptation" scene

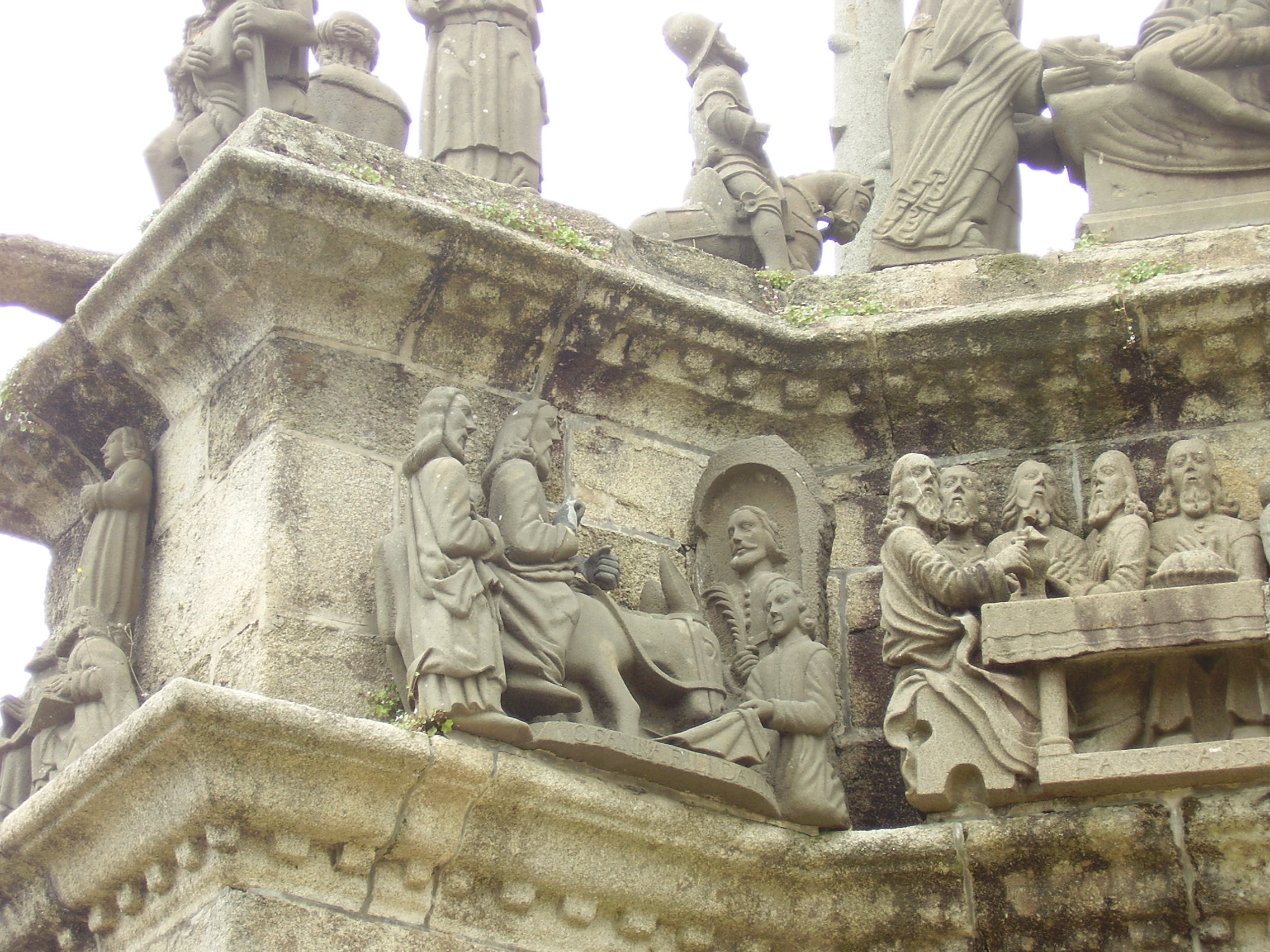
The Pleyben calvary. The entry into Jerusalem/Palm Sunday. The sculptor suggests the gates of Jerusalem by his depiction of a doorway to the right. In this doorway, one man holds a palm and the second lays down a rug by way of a welcome. To the right we see the beginning of the scene depicting the "Last supper". Under the ass we see the words "Hossana fili David".

== The porches at Landivisau, Guivapas, Lampaul-Guimiliau and Pencran ==
The Prigent atelier are attributed with work on the great porches at Landivisiau, Guivapas, Lampaul-Guimiliau and Pencran. They also completed work on the porches at Le Tréhou, Trémaouézan, Commana, Ploudiry and Quéménéven. Details are:-

== The porch at Landivisiau ==
The present Saint Thuriau church in Landivisiau was built between 1864 and 1865 replacing the earlier 16th-century building but the old church's porch and bell-tower were retained, fortunately so as they are both magnificent. The porch was dismantled and then re-erected in 1728 by Jean Perrot and Sébastien Roussel. The entrance to the porch comprises a semi-circular arch, with side buttresses and above the arch a pointed gable culminates in an elaborate lantern. Inside the porch are statues of the apostles, and a two-door entrance to the church has further decorated arches, with further statues on the wall as well as a tympanum. Unusually for porches in churches in the Élorn valley, the porch is accessed using ten steps. As at Pencran, Bastien Prigent created a series of piédroits and voussures depicting biblical and other scenes as decoration of the arch over the porch's entrance (the blocks of stone at the part of the arch near to ground level are the piédroits and the remaining wedge-shaped stones used in constructing an arch form the voussoirs. Above the biblical scenes in the arch's piédroits are depictions of the four Evangelists and their attributes, with Saints Luke and John positioned on the left and Mark and Matthew positioned on the right and finally a "heavenly choir" of thirty one winged angels are shown floating in the clouds and praying, singing, playing various instruments or holding censers. Above the entrance arch is a gable in the Gothic style and on this the sculptors placed a statue depicting a female saint reading a book and another female saint higher up has her hands crossed against her chest. The gable is also decorated with two lions supporting the blason of François de Tournemine. Above the gable there is an ornate lantern with three niches. The central niche contains a statue of Saint Thuriau to whom the church is dedicated. The two buttresses supporting the arch have niches containing statues of the four Evangelists each seated at a desk with their attributes at their side. The buttresses also hold a statue of the Virgin of the Annunciation and another depicting Saint Anne with the Virgin Mary. All these statues are by Bastien Prigent. The inside of the porch is vaulted and is decorated with the blason of the Danycan family and Henry Prigent added statues of "Christ the Saviour" and the twelve apostles in niches each with an elaborate canopy. The heads of these apostles were damaged during the turmoil of the French revolution and bear signs of restoration and some of the attributes were destroyed which makes identification difficult. The arches around the two doors giving access to the church are in turn richly decorated with garlands of thistles ("chardon") and grapes and a series of statuettes in niches, these depicting Saint Yves, Saint Peter holding a book and a key, Saint Salomon the Breton king wearing armour, holding a sword and the royal crown, Saint Miliau carrying his head in his hands, Saint Thivisiau, a bishop, Saint Côme holding a vase containing medications, Saint Damien (Côme and Damien were brothers and both doctors martyred under Diocletian), and another bishop giving a blessing. On the left side angels hold a cartouche reading "ANNO.DOMINI.1554" and on the right the cartouche reads "LAN.MIL.VCC.L1111.FVST.FONDE.CESTE.PORTAL.ET.ESTOIENT.LORS.FABRIQVES.Y.MART(I)N.J.ABGRALL". Above the doors a tympanum depicts angels holding phylacteries on either side of a statue of Jesus Christ. The phylactery held by the three angels on the left side reads "MEMENTO.MEI/O.MATER.DEI/PAX VOBIS" and that held by three angels on the right reads "DOMVS MEA/SALVATOR MVNDI/ LETVS MARIA". There is an elaborate stoup on the wall between the two entrance doors.

== Gallery of photographs-South porch of the Église Saint-Thuriau at Landivisiau ==
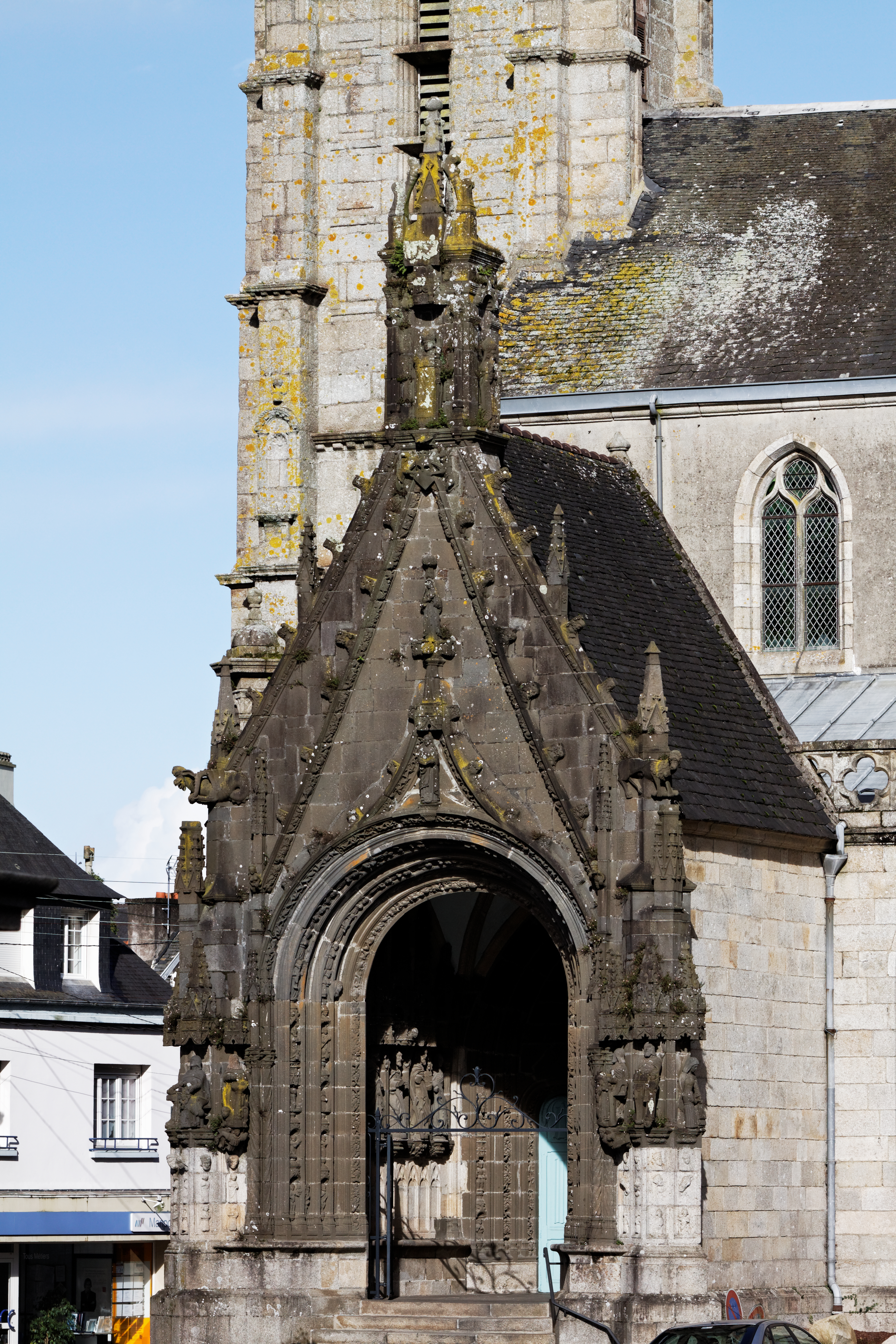
View of the south porch. Note the entrance arch and side buttresses and the pointed gable topped with a lanteron

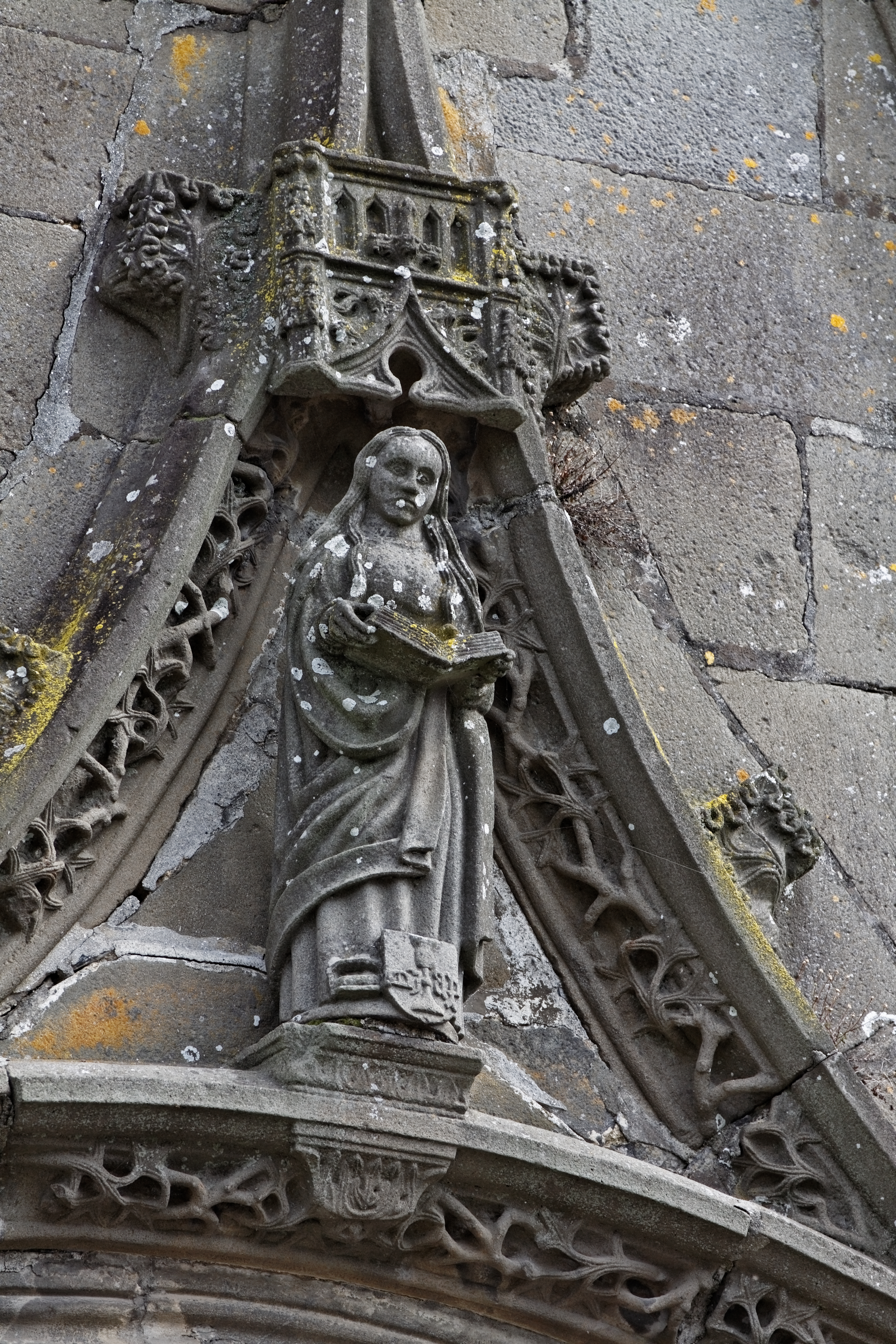
At the top of the gable is this statue depicting a saint reading a book.

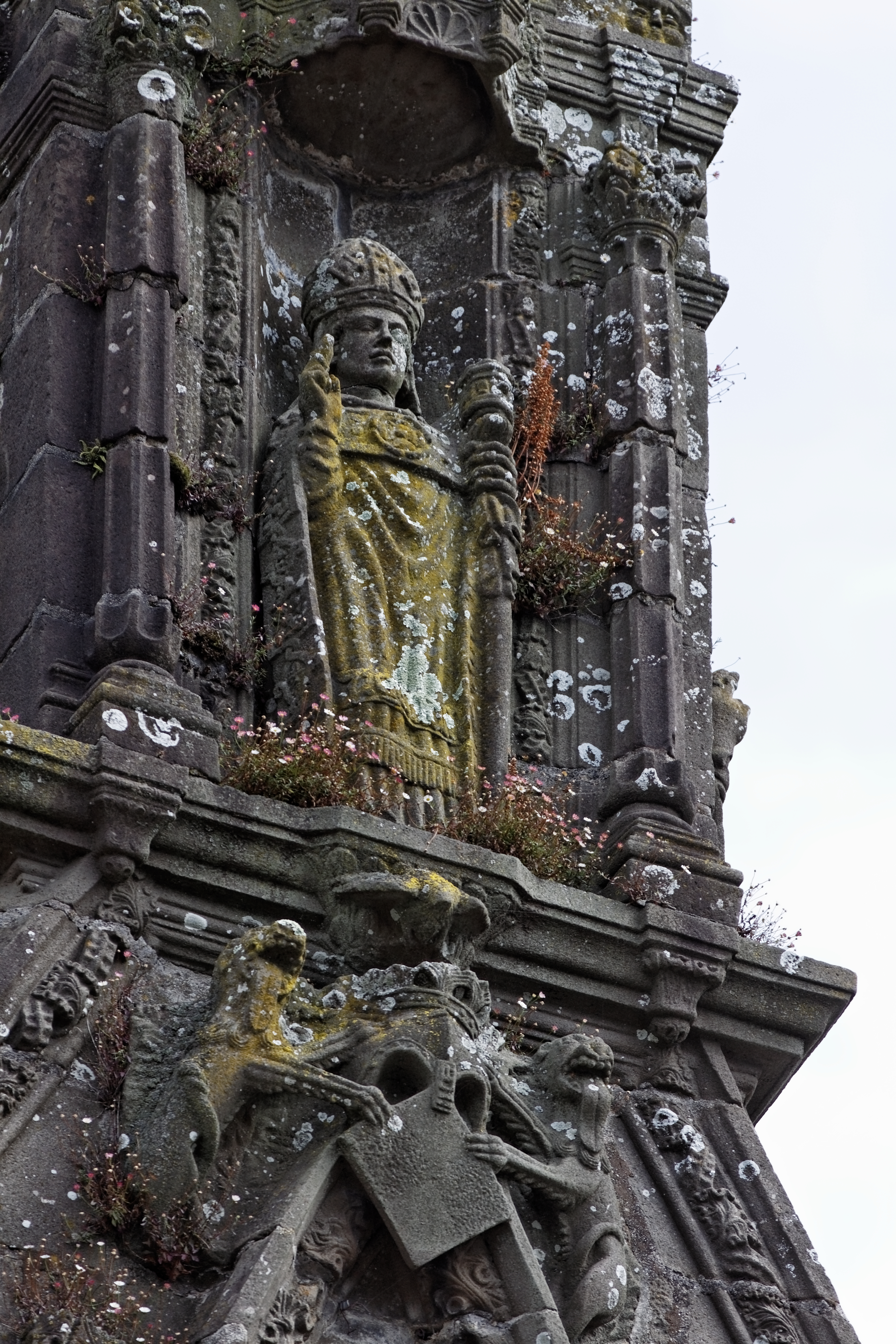
Saint Thuriau depicted in a niche in the lanteron at the top of the entrance arch. Saint Turiau is also known as Saint Tivisiau and in Breton legend was noted for his beautiful singing voice.

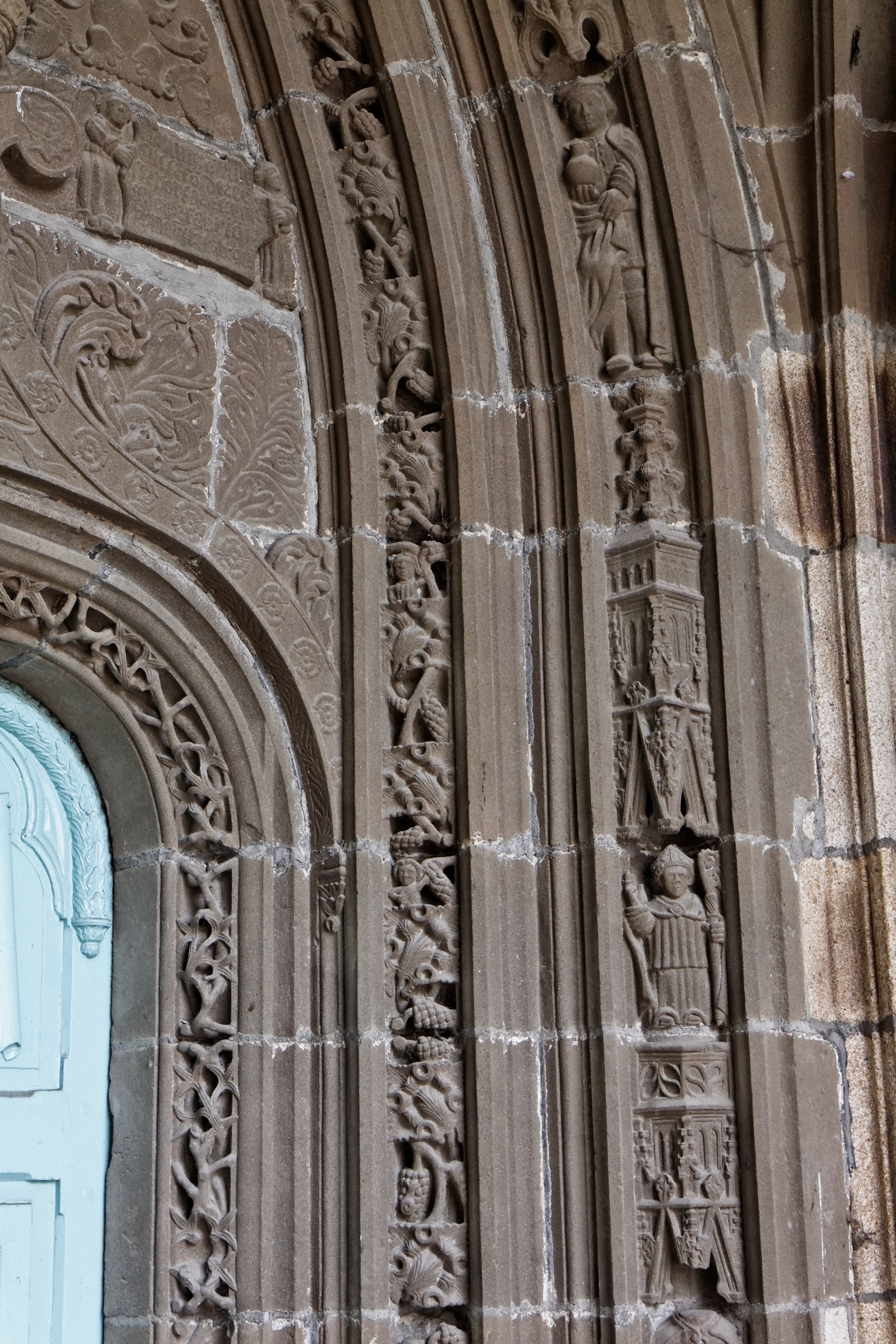
The carvings on the arch over the two entrance doors to the church

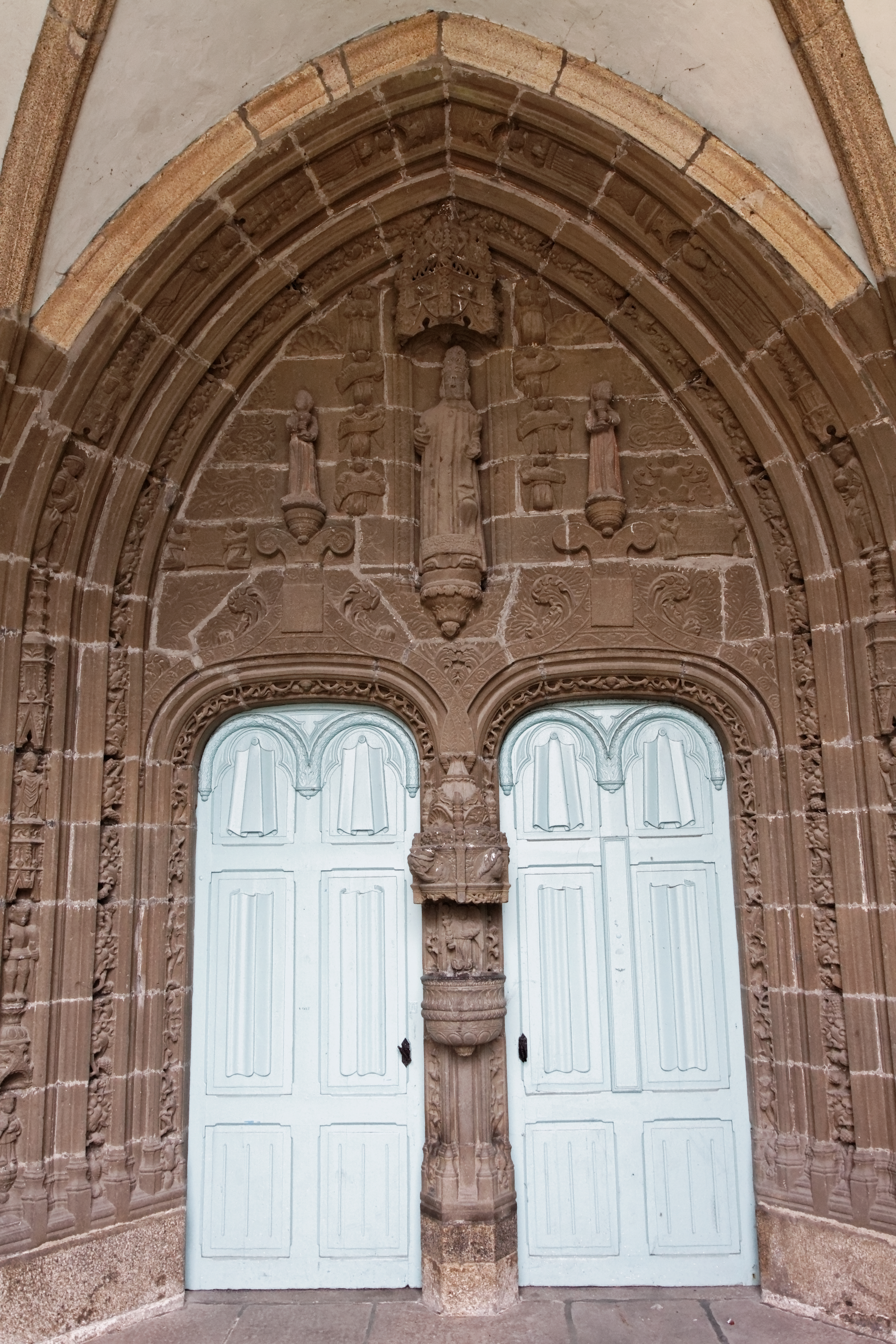
The two doors inside the porch leading to the church

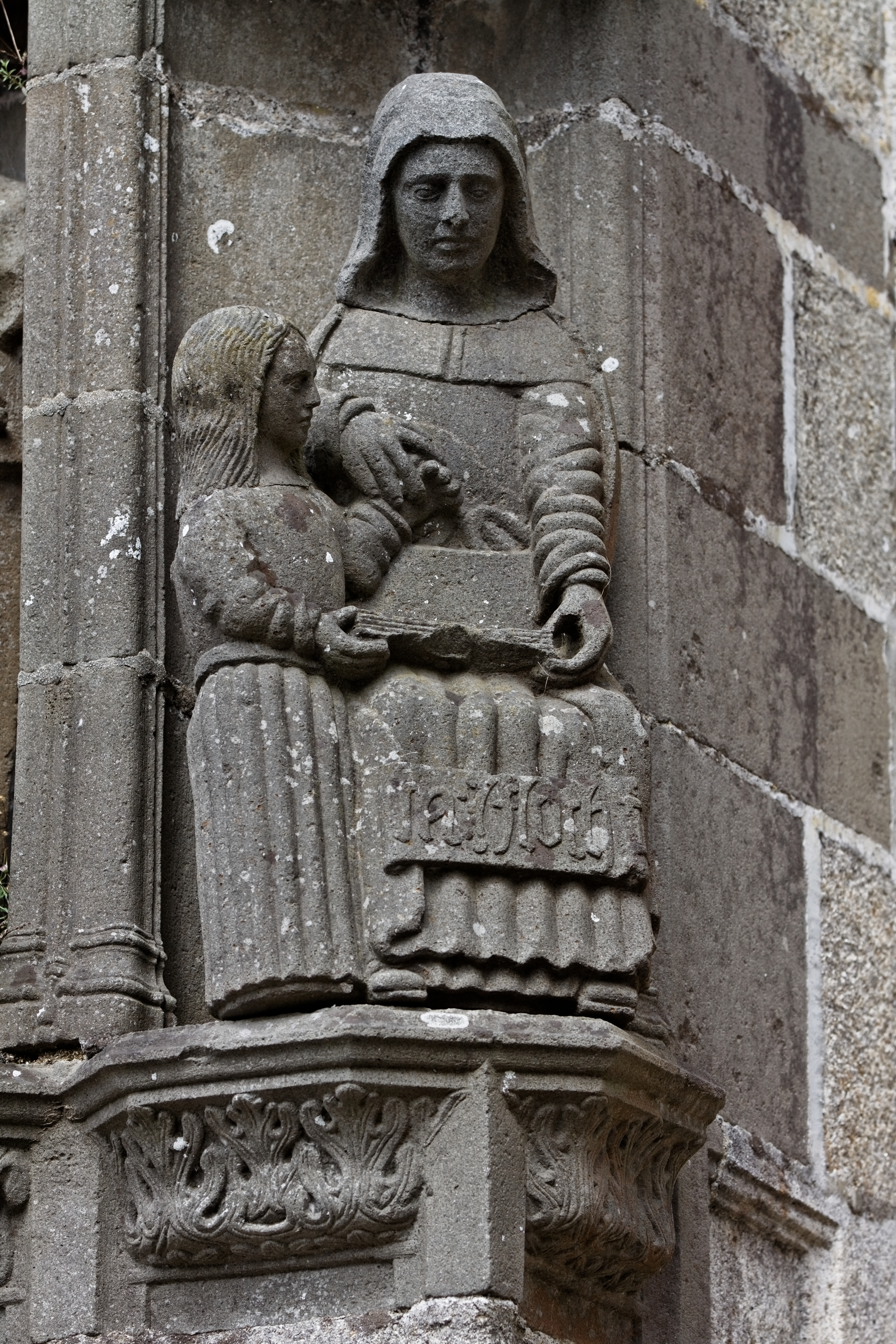
Saint Anne teaches the Virgin Mary to read. One of the sculptures in the buttresses supporting the arch

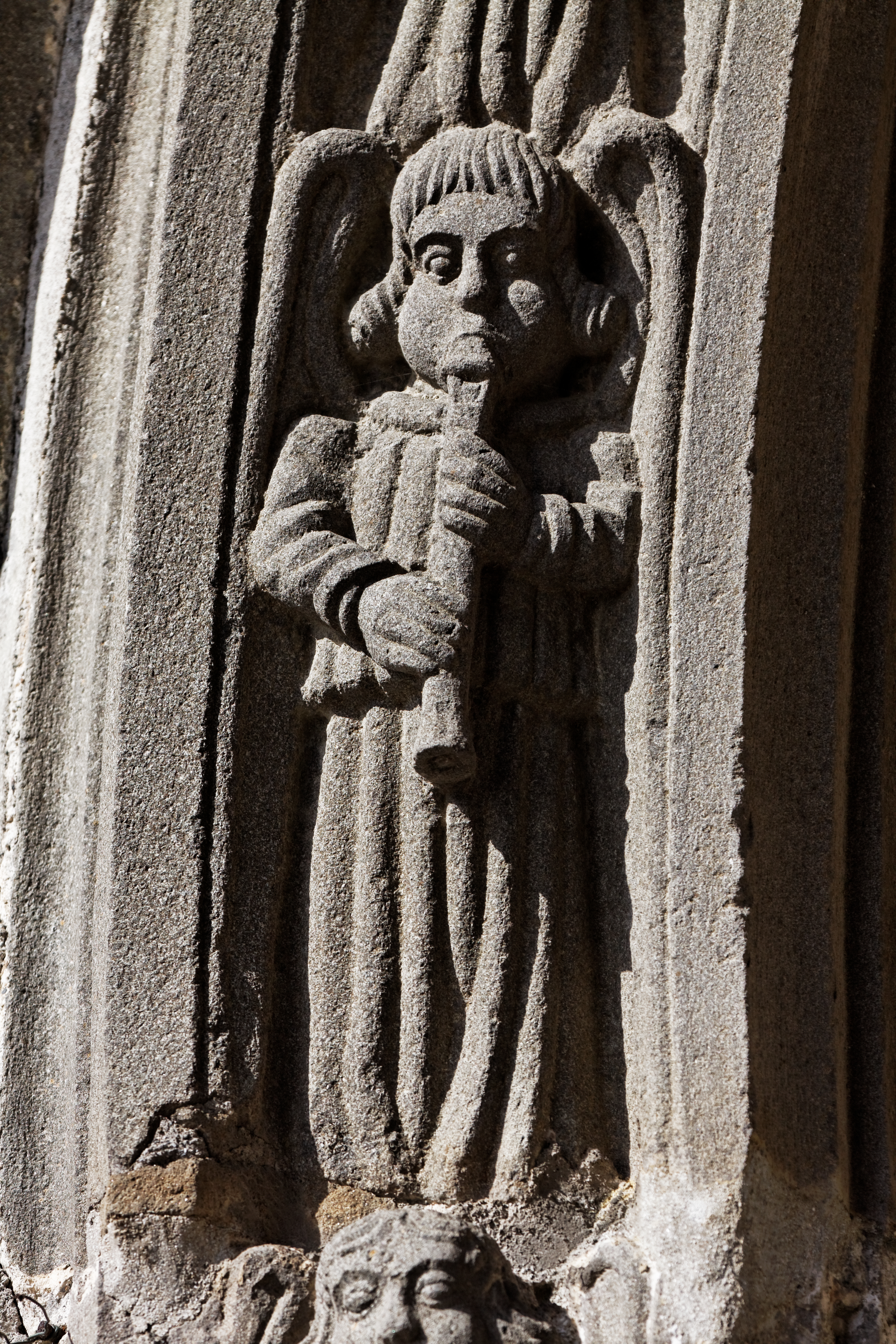
In the voussure of the entrance arch an angel plays a flute

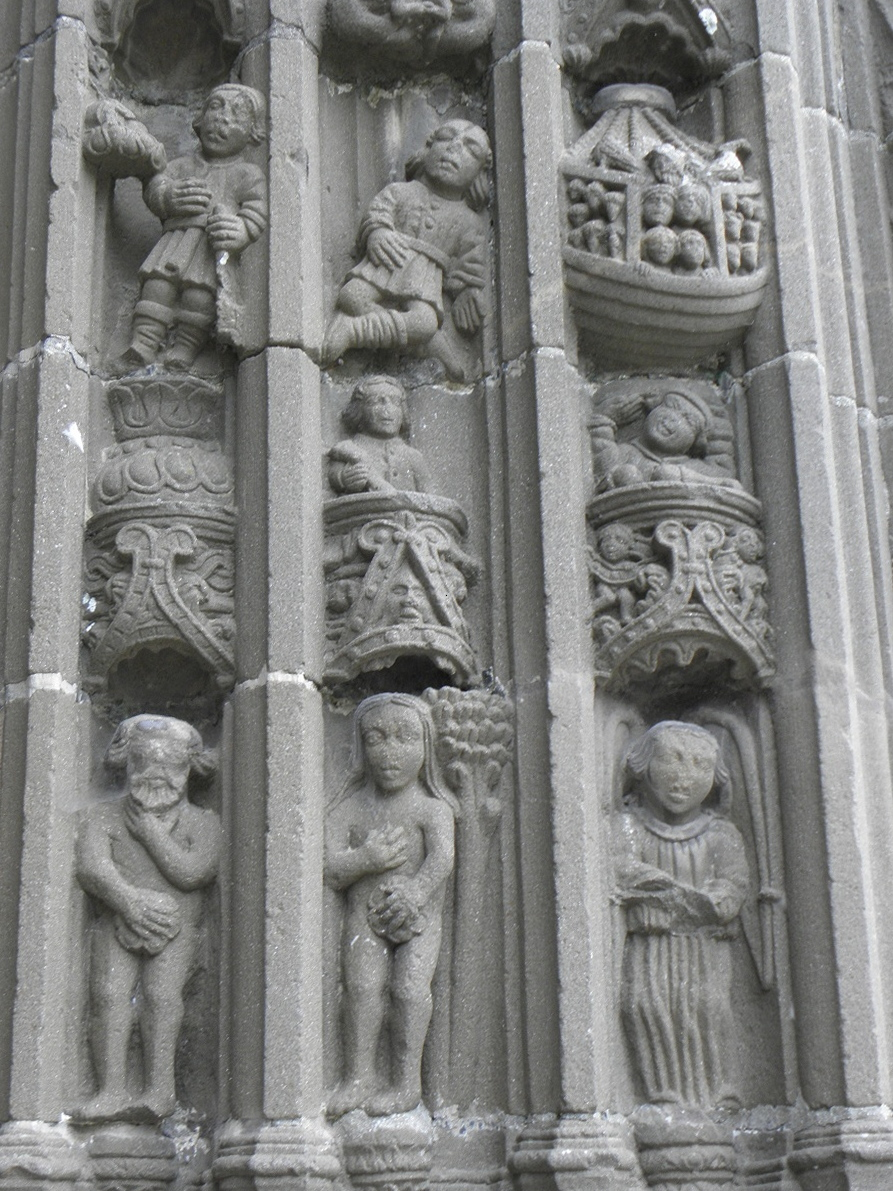
One of the carved voussure/piédroits decorating the outer rim of the entrance arch to the south porch at the église Saint-Thuriau (the lower level stones are known as piédroits and those wedge-shaped blocks higher up are voussures-voussoir in English). The scenes carved by Bastien Prigent include Adam and Eve's fall from grace, their expulsion from Eden, Adam working the land, Eve carrying Abel wrapped in swaddling clothes and Cain in a cradle, Cain and Abel making their sacrifice, Abel's murder, Noah cultivating his vine and picking the grapes and finally Noah's drunkenness and Cham's transgression. In this photograph the sculptures include Noah's ark crammed with people and animals, and Adam and Eve now aware of their nudity having tasted the forbidden fruit. They cover their private parts in shame

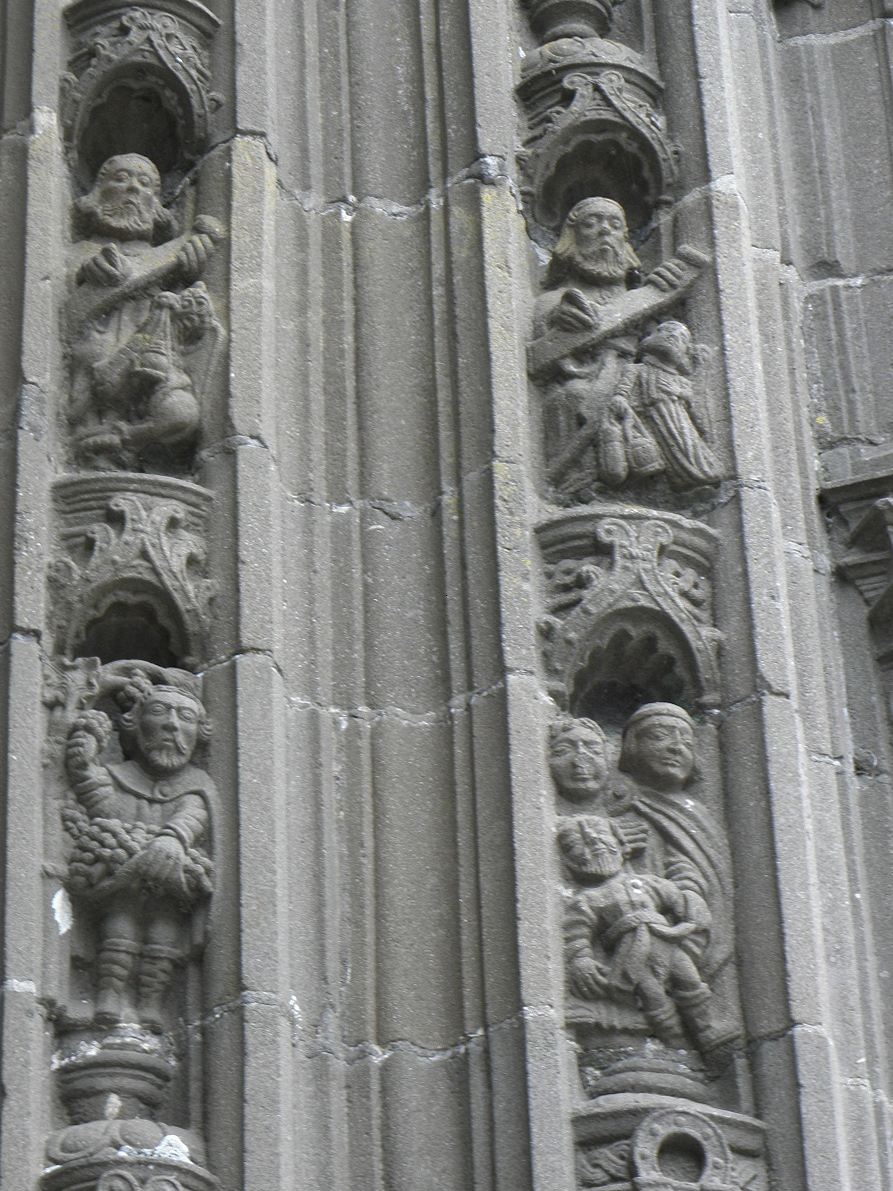
The scenes depicted here include Noah harvesting grapes from his vine and then Noah shown totally drunk! Above the biblical scenes, the voussure continues with the Evangelists. On the left side of the arch, Luke is shown with his attribute the lion and John with his attribute, a young boy. Mark and Matthew are depicted on the right side of the arch. After the Evangelists thirty one angels occupy the voussure, praying, playing instruments or holding their censers; a veritable "heavenly choir". Above the voussures are two sculptures. One is a small statue of a saint holding a book and the other is a saint with hands crossed against her chest.

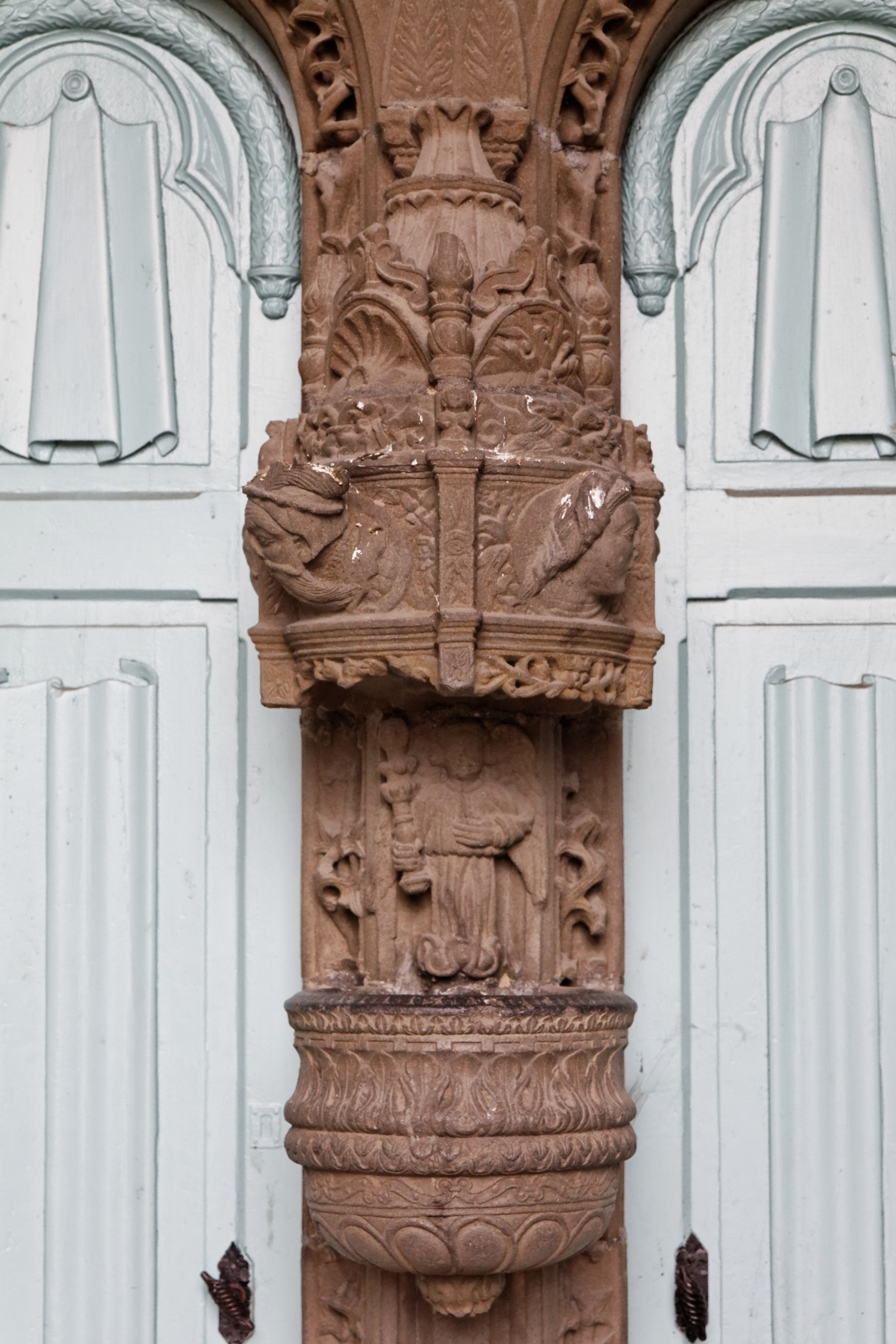
The highly decorated stoup in the porch of Landivisiau's Église Saint-Thuriau. This is fixed to the trumeau between the two entrance doors to the church. It is decorated with godrons (gadrooning) and beneath an elaborate canopy is the depiction of an angel holding a bottle brush or aspergillum ("Goupillon"), an allusion to the baptism. The renaissance dais features flat pilasters decorated with acanthus leaves, seashells and fire pots and the cartouches below depict four high relief carvings; the heads of two men, their feathered hats "à la Henri 111" alternating with the heads of two women whose long hair is held back by a hairband in the Renaissance style.

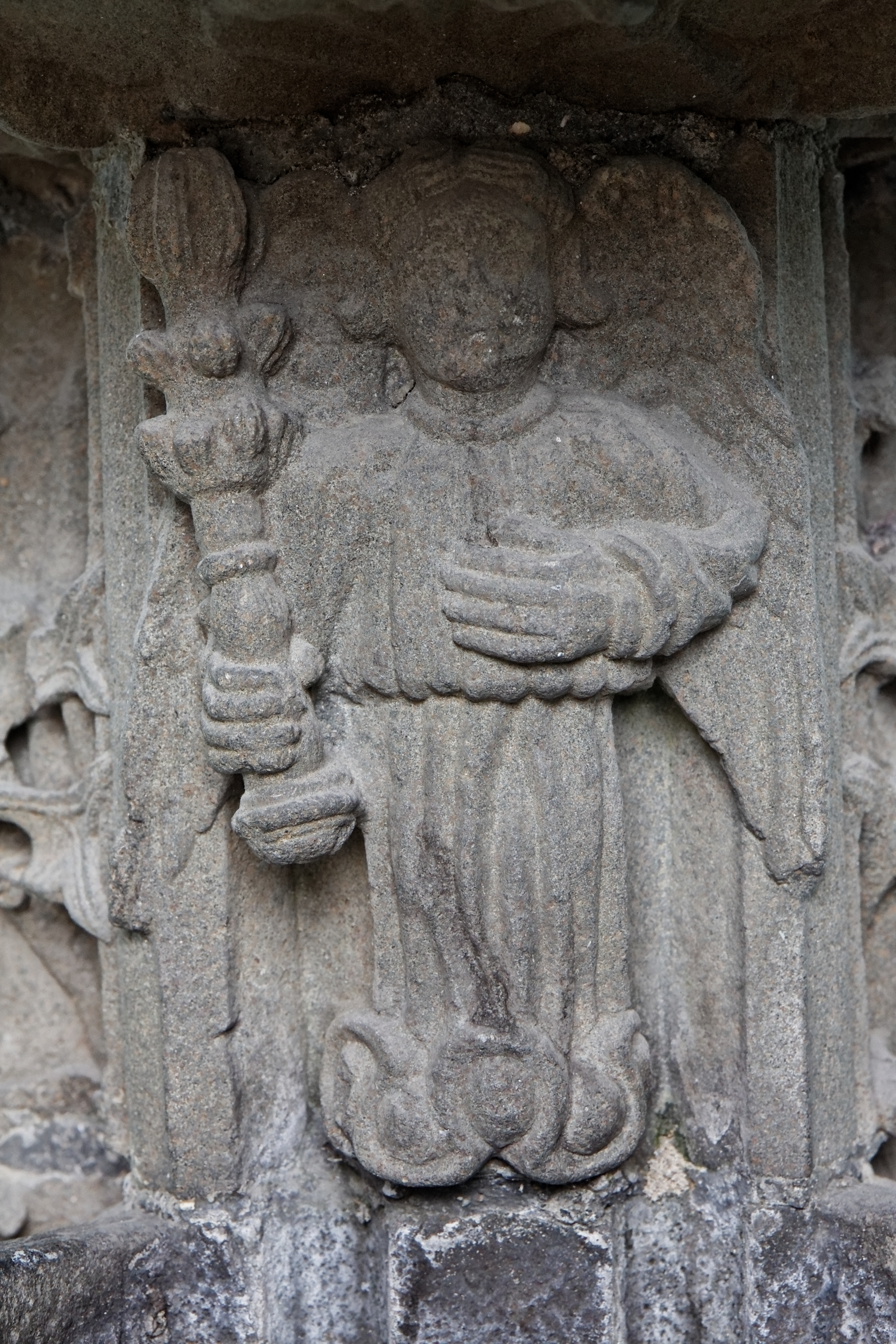
Figure on the stoup in the porch of Landivisiau's Église Saint-Thuriau. An angel holds a bottlebrush

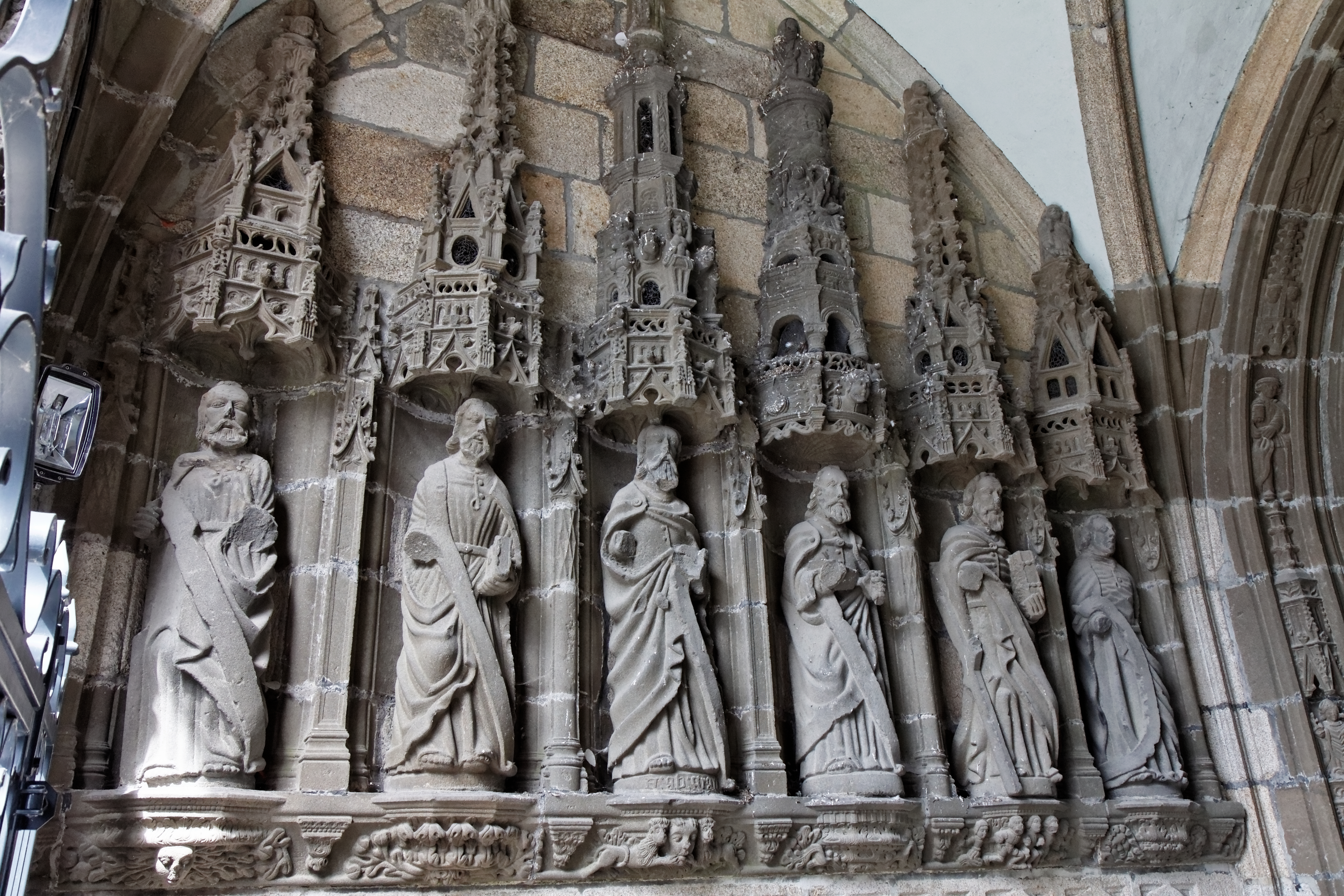
The apostles in the porch interior. As a consequence of the damage to the statues during the turmoil of the French revolution not all of the apostles can be identified. On the eastern side on the left as one enters the porch, the first apostle can be identified as Saint Peter, the third apostle is James the Major, the fourth is James the Lesser and the fifth is Saint John who holds a chalice and is beardless. On the other side only Saint Andrew is identifiable with his distinctively shaped cross. Note the elaborate canopy above each of the niches containing the apostles and the carvings on the platforms upon which they stand.

== The porch at Guipavas ==
There was a reference to a church in Guipavas in as early as 1394 and the building was restored in 1563 and 1565. Hit by incendiary bombs in 1944 in the Allied push to take Brest from the occupying Germans, the church was subsequently rebuilt but there was enough left of the 1563 north porch to retain it and it has some sculptures and carvings attributed to the Prigent atelier including statues of the apostles and Jesus Christ in the porch interior, although eight of them were all decapitated during the turmoil of the 1789 French revolution, part of a nativity scene in the tympanum above the entrance arch and seven angels in the archivolt. The church was given the status of a parish church in 1618. The bell- tower was struck by lightning and destroyed in 1791 The north porch of the église Saint-Pierre et Saint-Paul has a three centred arch or "basket handle arch" (also called "anse de panier") and was made using the local Kersantite. The arch is decorated with carvings of leaves and grapes which emerge from the mouths of a dog on one side and a dragon on the other. In the tympanum above the door is what is left of a nativity scene; the heads of an ass and a cow poke out from the stable. The buttresses contain contemporary sculptures of Joseph and the Virgin Mary. In the voussures of the archivolt all that remain are seven angels either at prayer, swinging a censer, playing a musical instrument or holding phylacteries. These are by Henry Prigent as are the statue of Christ and the apostles in the porch interior. Note: At the Chapelle Saint-Yves in Guipavas there is a statue of Saint Yves attributed to the Prigent atelier. It is located on the east wall to the left of the stained glass window.

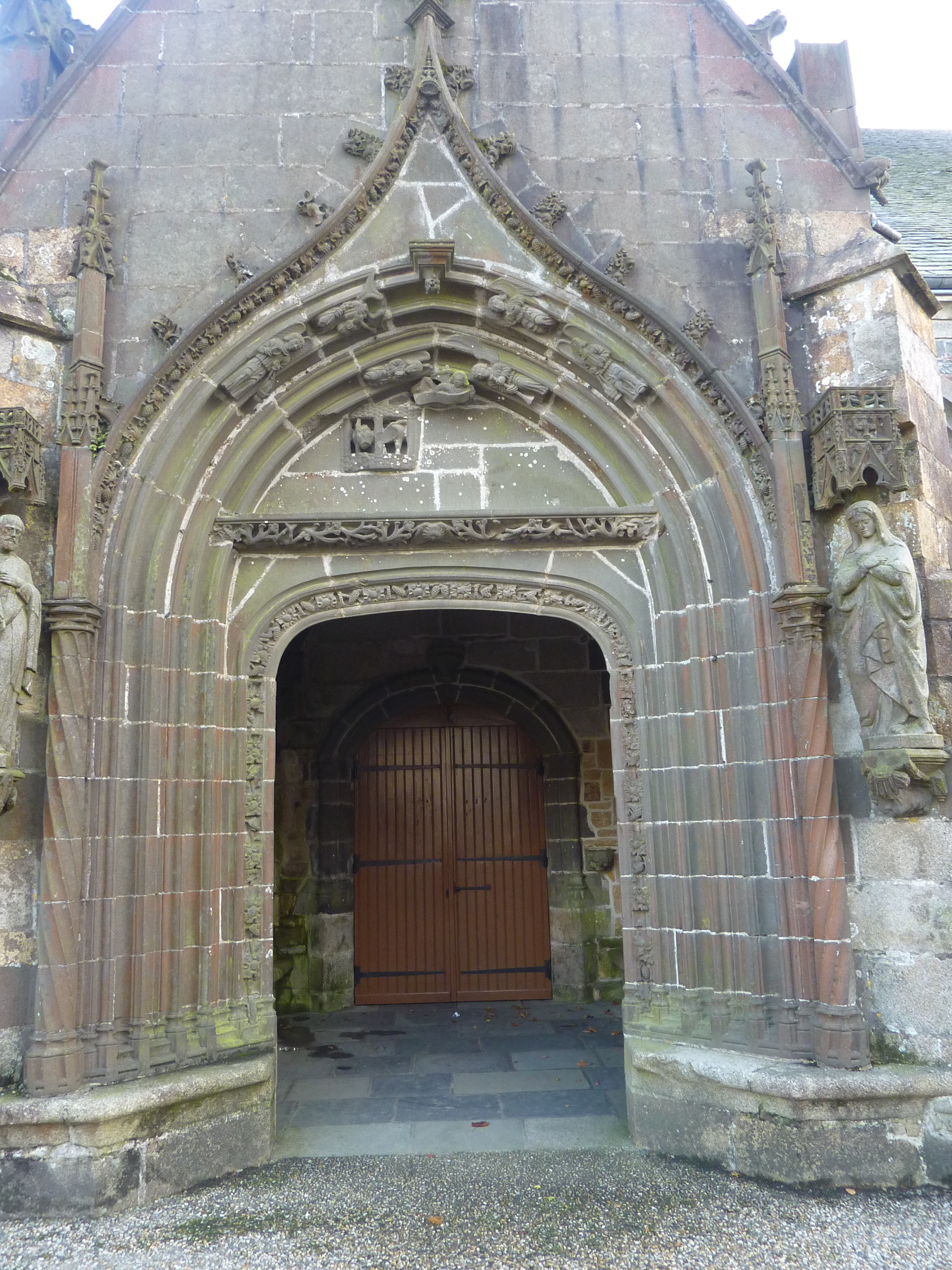
The north porch at Guivapas' église Saint-Pierre et Saint-Paul. Note what is left of a nativity scene in the tympanum

== The porch at Lampaul-Guimiliau ==
See also Lampaul-Guimiliau Parish close. The works at the Église Notre Dame porch attributed to the Prigent atelier are limited to the upper section of that porch. They are the statue of Saint Paul-Aurélien in a niche on the outside of the porch, a Saint Michel fighting a dragon situated below this niche and also the sculpture depicting the Virgin Mary and John the Evangelist at prayer with a small angel positioned between them on the top of the porch lantern. The sculptures depicting Saint Pol and Saint Michael are attributed to Bastien Prigent and those of the Virgin Mary, John the Evangelist and the angel are by Henry Prigent.

== Images at Lampaul-Guimiliau ==
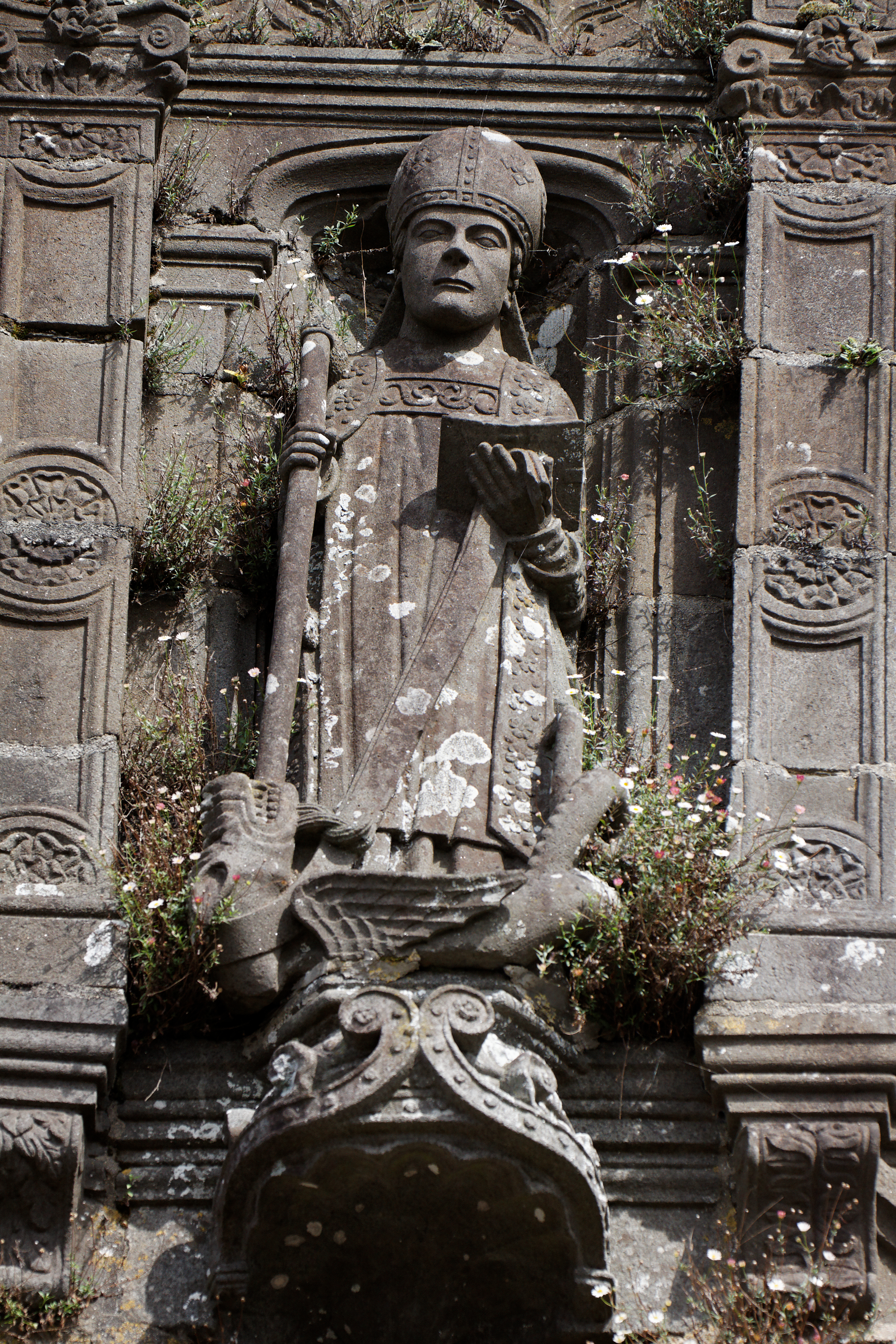
Statue of Saint Pol Aurélien by Bastien Prigent.

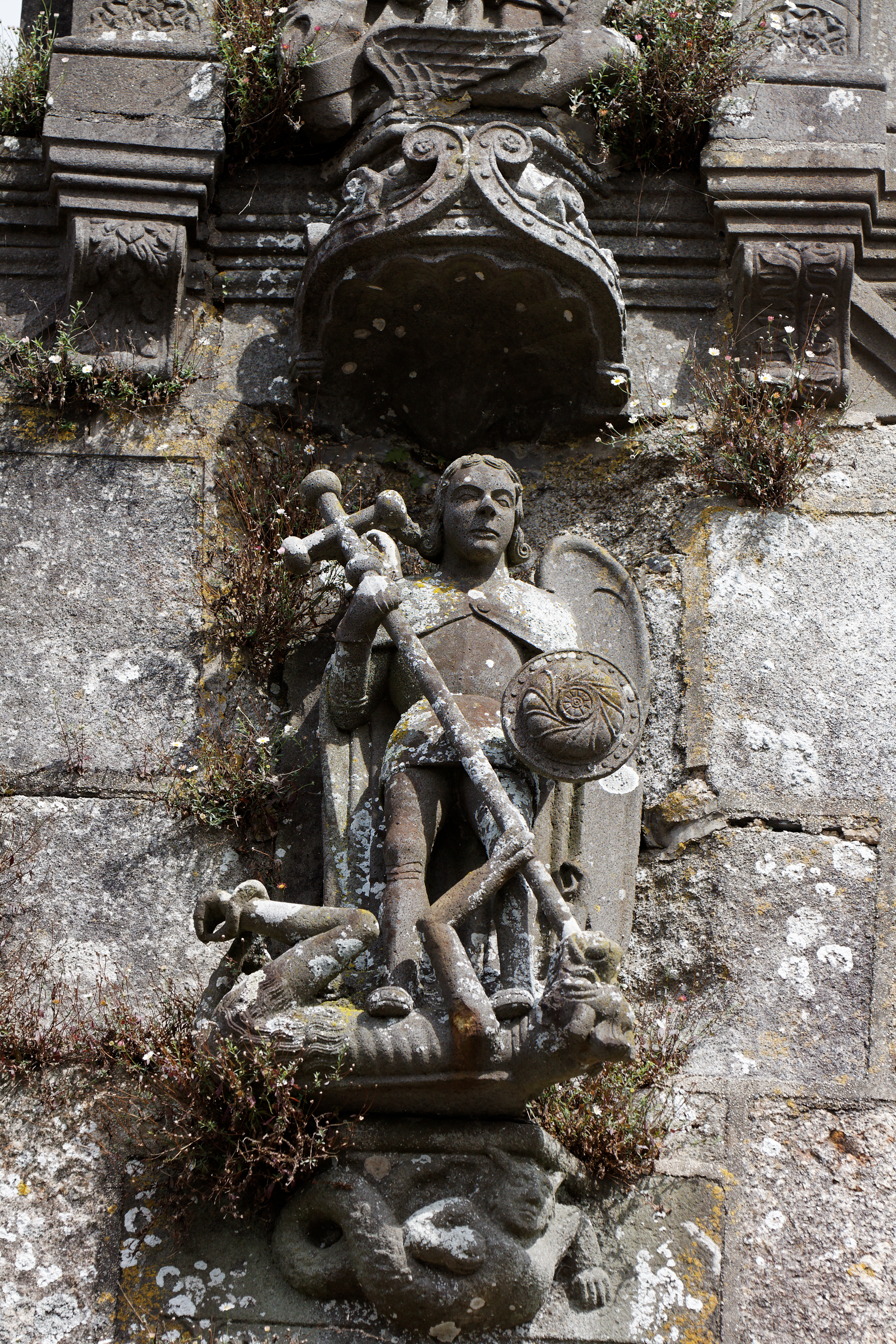
Saint Michael fighting the dragon by Bastien Prigent. The elaborate console or bracket beneath this sculpture depicting a form of sea monster is not by the Prigent atelier.

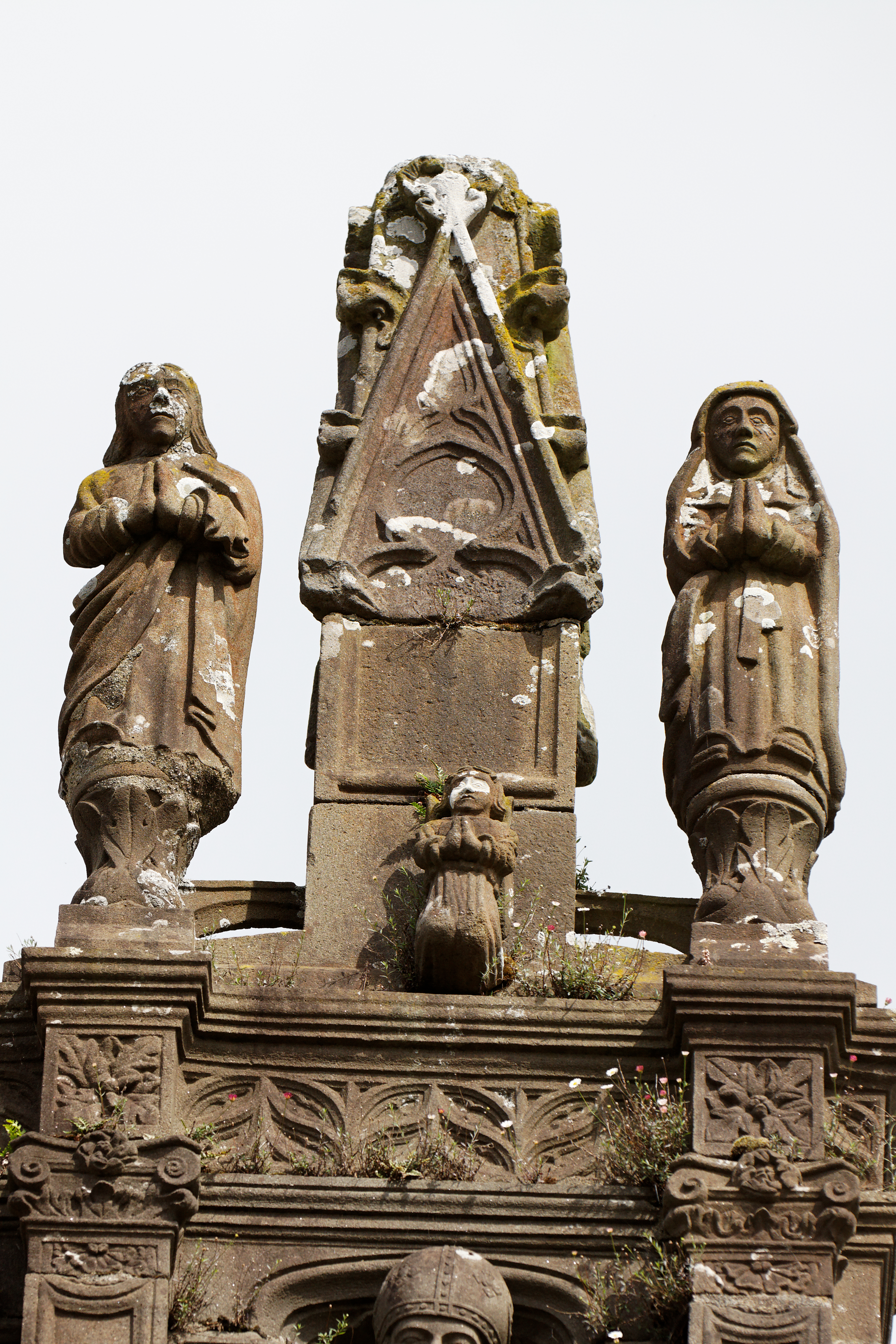
The Virgin Mary and Joseph at prayer-a work by Henry Prigent.

== The porch at Pencran ==
The porch's entrance arch is of the "basket handle" type ("anse de panier") and the external voussure immediately around the rim of the arch is decorated with vine leaves and grapes and small carvings of people eating grapes or at play and some dogs and a bird. These carvings start on the left side emerging from the mouth of a lion and end on the right side entering the mouth of a dragon. Around the interior voussure the same themes are repeated but a pig replaces the dragon. Above this arch a large tympanum contains what is left of a nativity scene with the Virgin Mary and Joseph, who have lost their heads, on either side of the baby Jesus, and the protruding heads of the ass and the cow. Around the central arch of the entrance, a further two bands of voussures and piédroits are elaborately decorated with scenes from both Old and New Testament. The piédroit is the stone at the bottom part of an arch up to the point when the arch begins to curve. The stones in the curved part of the arch are called voussures. The nine biblical scenes involves are thought to have been inspired by the Maître de Folgoët's porch at La Martyre. They start on the lower left side with the temptation of Eve, and we then move over to the right side and see an angel armed with a sword chasing Adam and Eve from the Garden of Eden. We continue to move from left to right and see Eve carrying the baby Abel in her arms whilst the baby Cain sleeps in a cot at her feet and then Adam at work in the fields. We next move to a scene showing Cain and Abel making their sacrifices. On the left Cain is not having great success and the smoke from his fire billows back into his eyes. His brother is having more success. We move next to a scene showing Cain murdering his brother. Next we see Noah's ark and Noah harvesting grapes and then fast a sleep having drunk too much wine. In the final scene from this sequence we see Cham trying to cover his father's nudity. After these biblical scenes there are depictions of the four Evangelists and their attributes. Mark and John are on the left and Luke and Matthew on the right. Finally the carvings are of a "heavenly" host of angels singing, praying and playing instruments; a celebration of the birth of Christ! Inside the porch the statues of the apostles are not by the Prigent atelier but the canopy is. There are also works by the Prigent atelier in niches in the buttress supporting the porch. A statue of Saint Anne teaching the Virgin Mary to read can be found in the right side niche of the right side buttress, a statue of Saint Suzanne can be found in the niche in the centre of the right side buttress and in a niche in the left side buttress is a statue of the Virgin Mary. By the west wall in the south transept there are the remains of a statue of Saint Sebastian attributed to the Prigent atelier and on the lawn a kneeling Mary Magdalene is by Bastien Prigent.

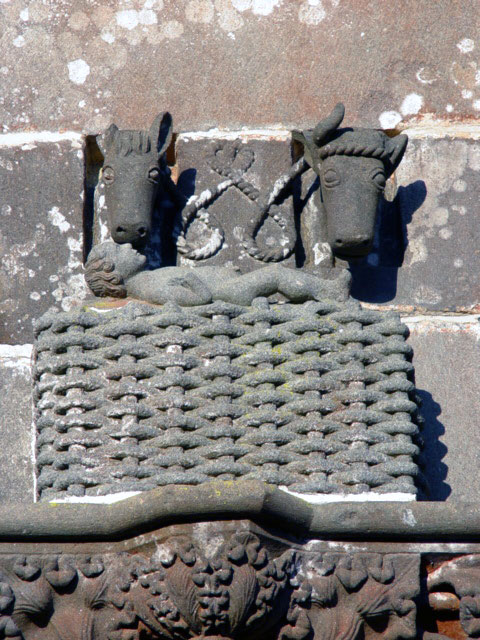
Part of the nativity scene in the Pencran porch tympanum.

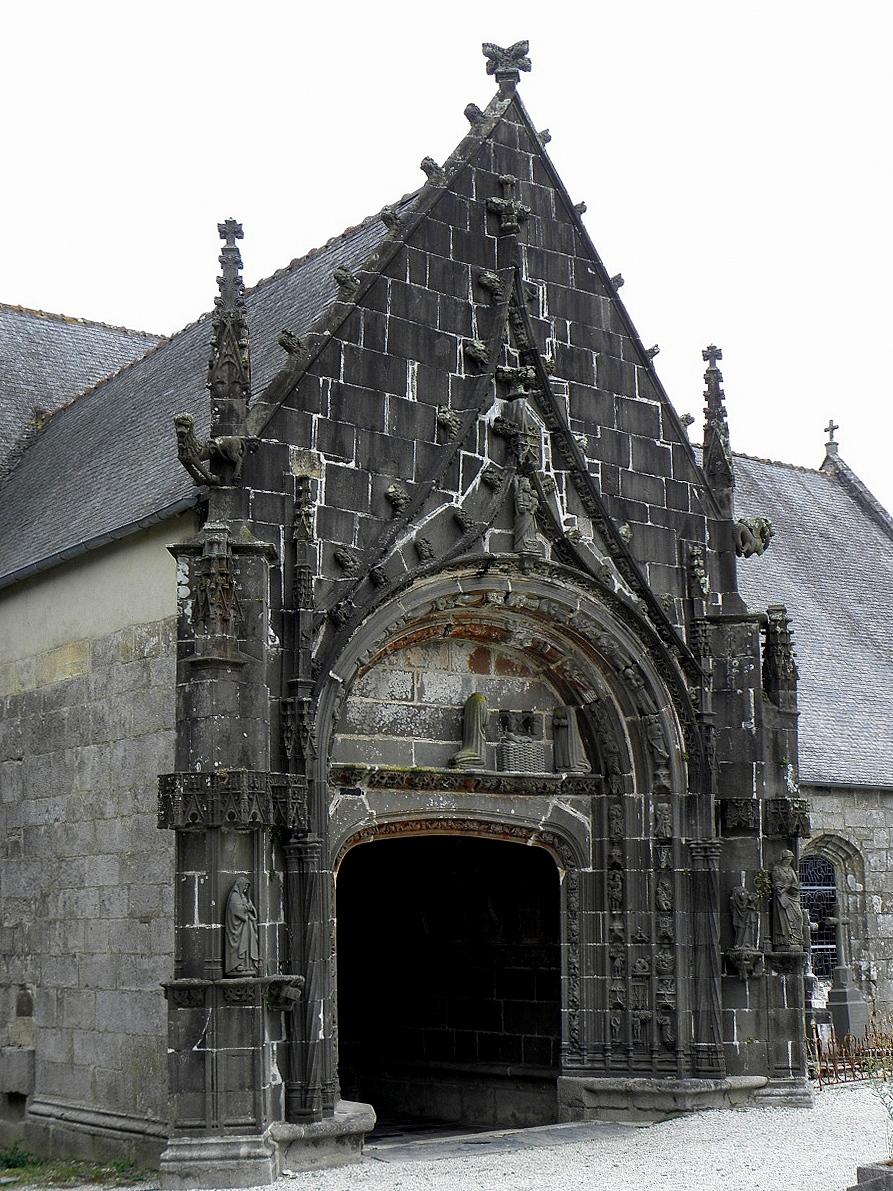
The south porch at Pencran

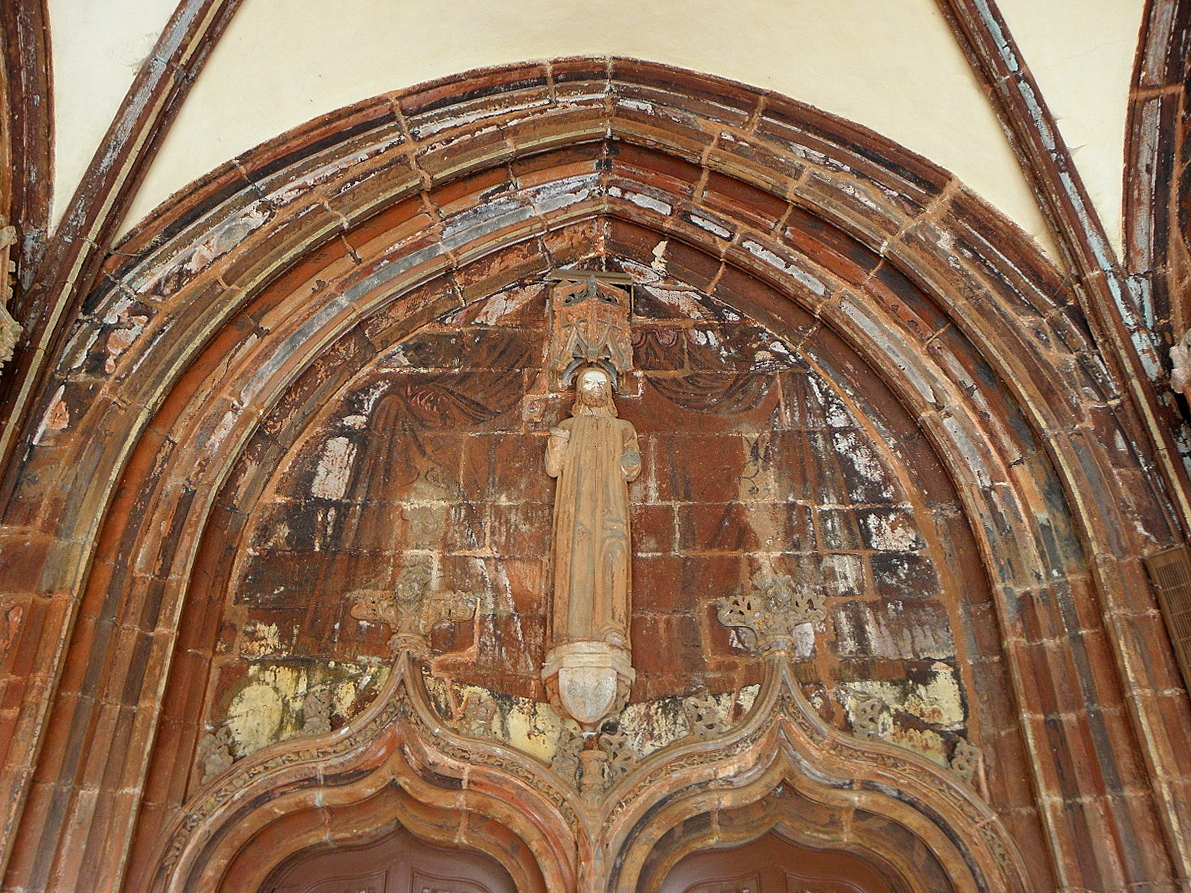
The sculpture in the porch interior and above the double entrance doors to the church

== The porches at Le Tréhou, Trémaouézan, Commana, Ploudiry and Quéménéven ==
Works attributed to the Prigent brothers can be found in other church porches in the Élorn valley. There are works by Bastien Prigent in Le Tréhou, Trémaouézan, Commana and Ploudiry and by Henry Prigent in Quéménéven. At Le Tréhou there is a statue by Bastien of Saint Pitère decorating the niche on the porch gable. The saint holds a book and a palm (see also Le Tréhou Parish close) It is at Le Tréhou that we can see Roland Doré's statues of the apostles in the porch interior.

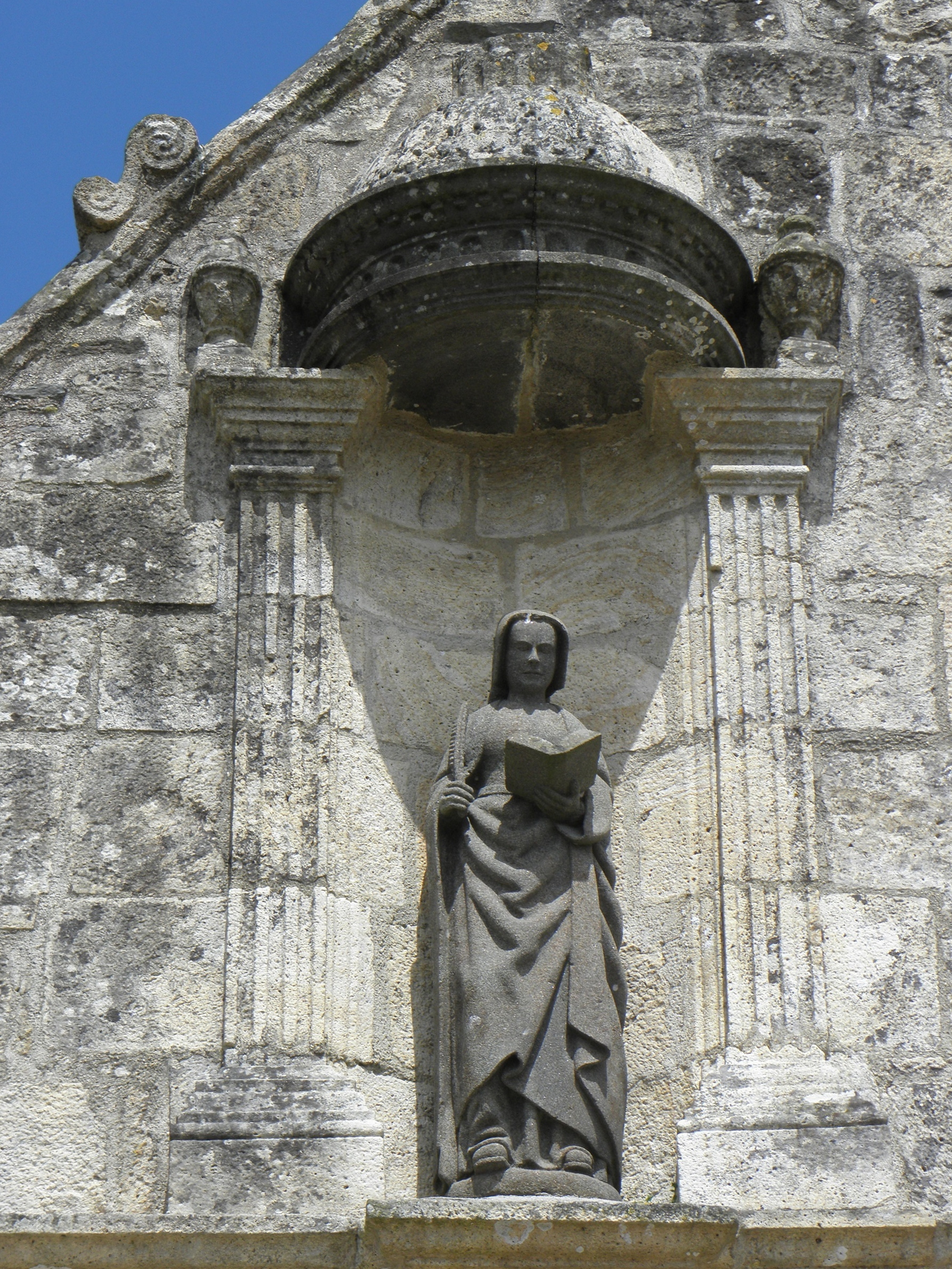
Bastien Prigent's statue of Saint Pitère

At Trémaouézan's Église Notre-Dame (see Trémaouézan Parish close) the statue of Saint Trinité in the right side niche in the porch buttress on the right side is attributed to Bastien Prigent. God the Holy Father is depicted sitting with the body of his dead son across his knees. At Commana, see Commana Parish close Bastien Prigent is attributed with the statues of the Virgin Mary (Vierge de la Nativitė) and Joseph (Saint Joseph de la Nativitė) placed on the porch buttresses. Joseph stands with his pilgrim's stick held across his chest. The Virgin Mary is depicted at prayer. At Ploudiry, see Ploudiry Parish close, Bastien Prigent was responsible for the statue of Saint Sebastian in the right side buttress.

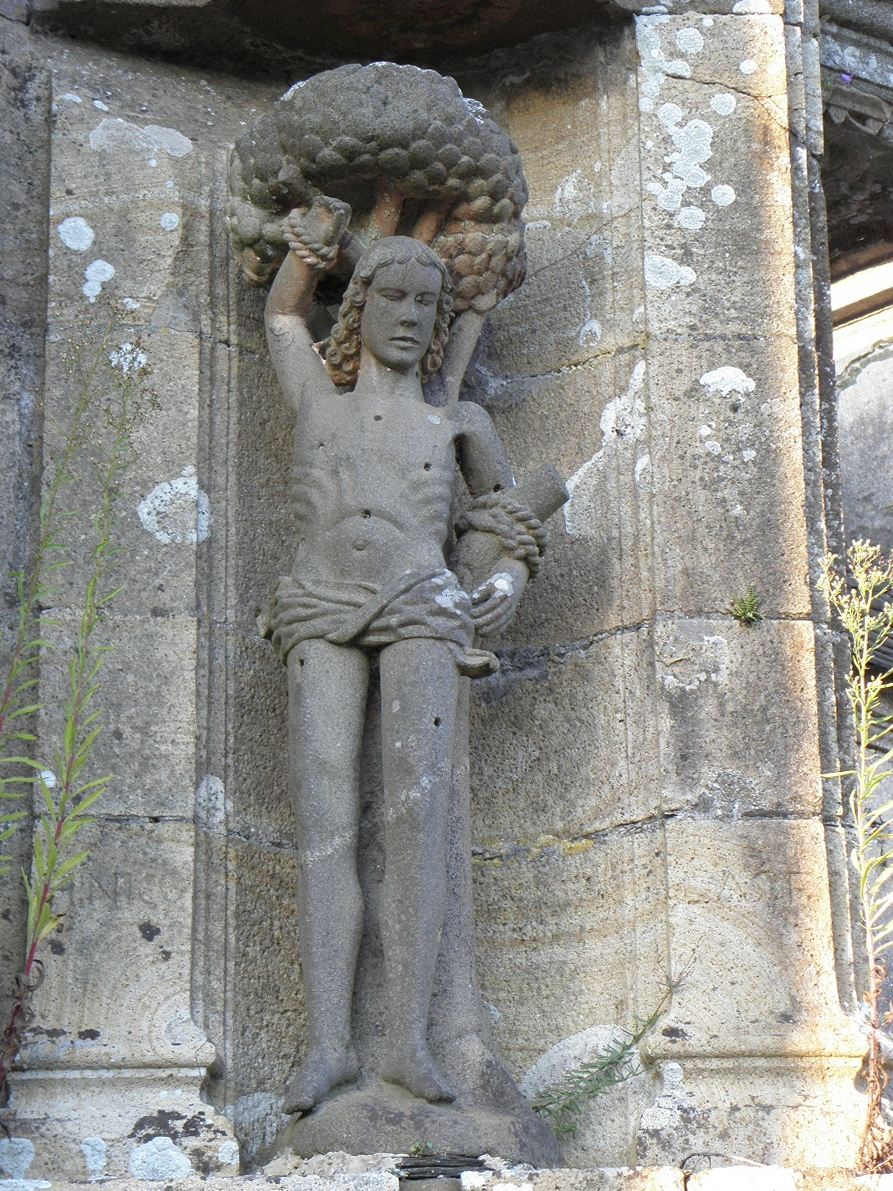
Bastien Prigent's statue of Saint Sebastian at Ploudiry

At Quéménéven, Henry Prigent was the sculptor of the statue of Saint Lawrence who carries a closed book and a gridiron to remind us of the nature of his martyrdom.

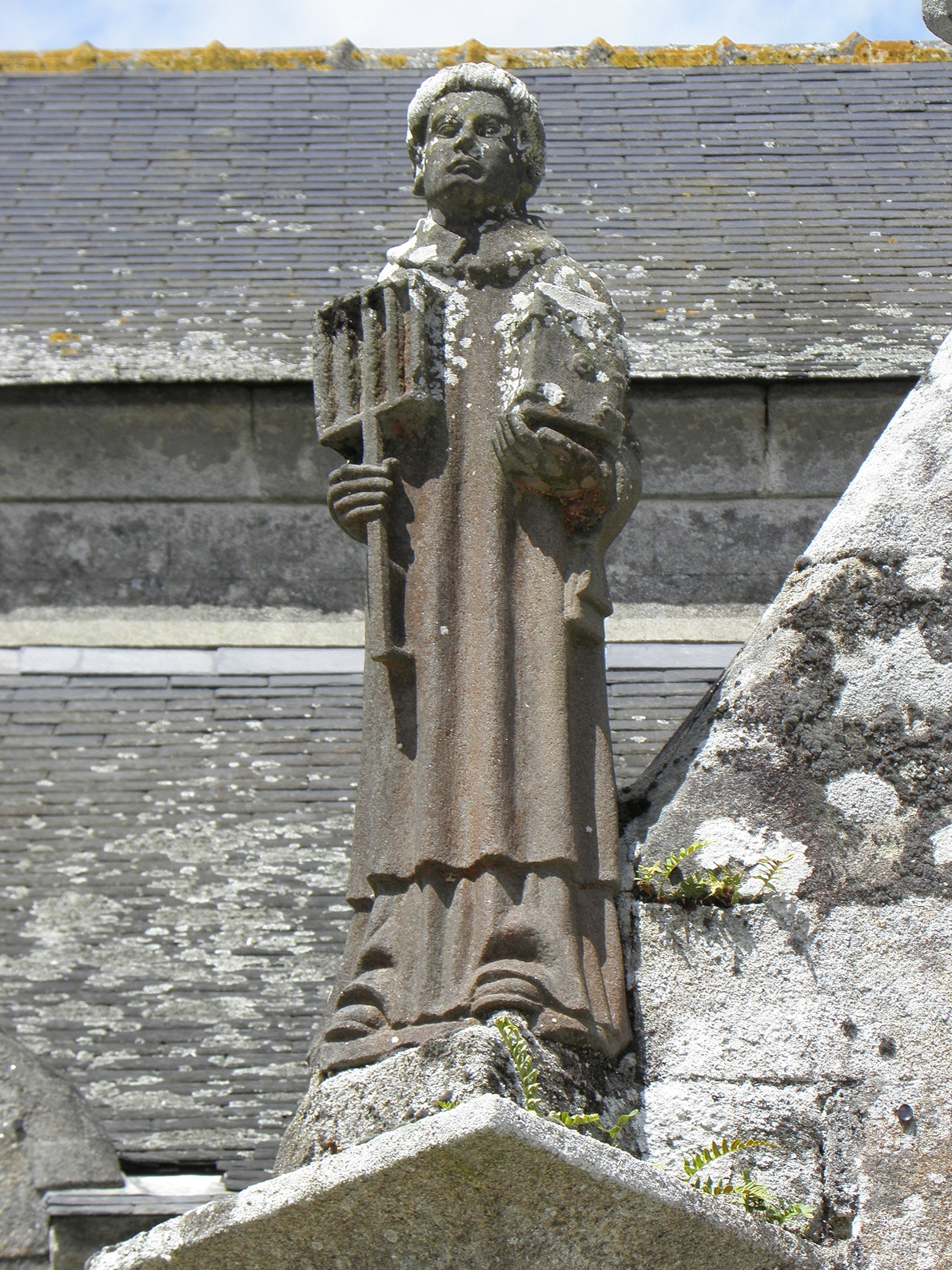
The Henry Prigent statue of Saint Lawrence at Quéménéven. He holds a gridiron

== Crosses and calvaries where parts are attributed to the Prigent atelier ==
Emmanuelle Le Seac'h reckons that there are 17 calvaries in the region that have been re-erected using sculptures from various workshops. Some of these are described below:-

Type of sculpture	Location	Description
The Croix-de-la-Vierge calvary	Landerneau	There is a Henry Prigent pietà mixed with other statues which date to 1681.
Church calvary	Lanneufret	Back to back statues from the Prigent atelier of the Virgin Mary paired with a "Christ liė", a pietà and John the Evangelist paired with a monk are mixed with a 20th-century crucifixion.
Church calvary	Plonevez-Porzay	The depiction of the crucified Christ and an angel carrying a titulus are attributed to the Prigent atelier. There are also statues depicting Saints Herbot and Miliau which date to 1925.
Chapel calvary	Pleyben	Outside the Saint-Laurent chapel, the calvary's Virgin Mary back to back with Saint Laurent, the depiction of the resurrected Christ and a back to back John the Evangelist paired with a bishop are all by the Prigent atelier.
Church calvaries	Ploudaniel	In the Saint Éloi chapel are the remains of two calvaries. There is a back to back statue of John the Evangelist and another saint and a "Christ aux outrages" (Jesus being mocked). Also outside Ploudaniel's Saint-Pėtronille chapel there is a calvary attributed to the Prigent atelier with statues of Saint Pėtronille and John the Evangelist by Bastien Prigent and by the shaft of the cross a Mary Magdalene attributed to the atelier.
Cross of Laguen	Guimiliau	The Prigent atelier are attributed with the depiction of the crucified Christ paired with the Virgin Mary with child.
Cemetery calvary	Bourg-Blanc	The Prigent atelier were responsible for the statues of the rich man back to back with John the Evangelist, Mary Magdalene back to back with Saint Yves and the Virgin Mary back to back with a poor man as well as the crucified Christ and a "Christ liė".
Church calvary	Saint-Derrien	Here there is a calvary where statues of the Virgin Mary, the crucifixion paired with a pietà and a statue of John the Evangelist are attributed to the Prigent atelier as are statues of the Virgin Mary, John the Evangelist and Saint Derrien on horseback.
Church calvary	Quimper	In the cloister garden of Quimper's Église Notre-Dame de Locmaria there are the remains of a calvary and the Prigent atelier are attributed with a back to back statue of Saint Peter paired with the Virgin Mary.
The calvary at Brondusval	Plouider	Little is left of the calvary but the statues of Saint Yves, Saint Fiacre and an unidentified saint are attributed to the Prigent atelier.
Calvary of the "Maison du sculptor Quillivic"	Plouhinec	This is a contemporary calvary where the image of the crucified Christ is replaced by the top section of the frame of a Gothic window. The calvary does have back to back statues of the Virgin Mary paired with Saint Yves and John the Evangelist paired with Francis of Assisi, all four being the work of Bastien Prigent.
The Lambader chapel calvary	Plouvorn	The calvary has statues of the Virgin Mary and Mary Magdalene by the Prigent atelier who also carved the blason of the Audren de Kerdrel and the emblem of the "Cinq-Plais" (the five wounds of Christ) which decorate the calvary
Calvary in church cemetery	Guissény	The calvary is inscribed "J. Habasc gouver(neur) 1555" and the statues are attributed to Henry Prigent. The calvary was originally located at the Saint Yves chapel at Kervézennec but after the 1920 pilgrimage ("mission") it was erected at Guissény by the restorer Donnart. The calvary has a depiction of the Virgin Mary back to back to a depiction of Saint Yves, the crucified Christ reversed with a "Christ lié" and John the Evangelist backed with a depiction of a bishop. The head of John the Evangelist has disappeared and the head of the bishop is not the original head.^^
Calvary of the Chapelle Pol	Brignogan-Plages	The calvary at the Pol chapel is carved from kersanton stone. The calvary is 4.50 metres high and the crosspiece has a praying angel in the centre and back to back statues of the Virgin Mary paired with an apostle and Saint Nicolas paired with a female saint. Of this calvary only the depiction of the crucified Jesus and the praying angel are by Henry Prigent. Further statues by Prigent which were originally part of the calvary can be seen in the chapel itself with a back to back depiction of Saint Paul Aurelian and an unidentified saint as well as a depiction of Saint Nicholas in the choir area, a pietà on the east wall and a "Christ ressuscitė" on the south wall.
Calvary of the Église Sainte Marie Madeleine	Dinéault	Only the pedestal supporting the calvary has work by the Prigents with Bastien Prigent carving a depiction of Mary Magdalene, her head looking up to Jesus on the cross and John the Evangelist standing, his head bowed and with furrowed brow whilst Francis of Assisi is depicted at the foot of the shaft of the cross and on the front of the pedestal a bas-relief depicting a monk holding out a cloth on which a holy face is carved. These worke date to 1550. The photograph shown to the right is of Bastien Prigent's John the Evangelist. The statues on the crosspiece are not by the Prigent workshop, but date to 1696 and depict back to back statues of the Virgin Mary paired with Saint Sébastien, a bishop backed with a pietà, a depiction of Mary Magdalene on her knees and lifting the lid from her pot of ointment and John the Evangelist paired with Saint Peter whilst the sculpture of the crucified Jesus reversed with a "Christ aux liens" are attributed to the Roland Dorė workshop. This calvary is 6.00 metres high. Further Prigent sculptures can be seen in the Église Sainte Marie Madeleine itself.
The calvaries at la Croix-Neuve and Kersaingilly.	Guiclan	There are two calvaries in the Guiclan area. Of the sculpture involved with the Croix-Neuve calvary only the statue of Saint Veronica and the Virgin Mary with infant are by the Prigent atelier. The calvary is a simple one with statues of Saint Veronica and the Virgin Mary with child positioned on either side of the depiction of the crucified Christ. The Kerrsaingilly calvary features depictions of Saint Yves, the crucified Christ reversed with the Virgin Mary with child and Saint Gilles and the Prigent workshop only worked on the statue of Saint Yves. Bastien Prigent is attributed with the work. Saint Yves is depicted in the robe of a lawyer. This statue came from La Roche-Maurice and was added to the calvary when in 1889 it was restored by Yan Larhantec.
Calvary of the Église Notre Dame	Le Folgoët	In many instances calvaries in Brittany were restored or reconstructed using works by separate sculptors or ateliers, which can make attribution difficult. The 6-metre-high (20 ft) Le Folgoët calvary is an example of this with the Prigent workshop's pietà on the west face of the calvary being mixed with a depiction of Cardinal de Coëtivy by the Maître du Folgoët and a crucifixion attributed to the Maître de Plougastel. The nearby musée du Doyenné has remains of a calvary on the lawn, this attributed to Fayet.
Calvary in cemetery	La Forest-Landerneau	In the upper section of La Forest-Landerneau's cemetery are the remains of an old calvary, the three pieces involved being attributed to the Prigent workshop. The sculptors have captured perfectly the grief and the sense of loss felt by those depicted. One piece depicts the Virgin Mary back to back with Mary Magdalene and another pairs John the Evangelist with an unidentified saint. They stand on either side of a pietà. All have tears rolling down their cheeks. John the Evangelist places a hand on his chest and the unidentified saint behind him opens his hands in a gesture of powerlessness. In the lower part of the same cemetery is a 6-metre-high (20 ft) calvary involving a back-to-back work depicting the Virgin Mary and a female martyred saint, a depiction of the crucified Christ backed with a pietà and John the Evangelist depicted back to back with a bishop and at the base of the cross is a depiction of a kneeling Mary Magdalene, her pot of ointment on the ground at her side, her face racked with grief. Attribution of these works is unclear, but the kneeling Mary Magdalene has been attributed to the Prigent workshop. The calvary also bears the coats of arms of both France and Brittany, a reference to a "mission" or pilgrimage of 1887 and the date 1762, probably a date when the calvary underwent some restoration. The remains of a calvary in La Forest-Landerneau's cemetery
The Croix de Saint Sauveur	Kerlouan	The Croix de Saint Sauveur was destroyed during the Second World War but Bastien Prigent's "Holy Trinity" has survived although scarred by chiseling. The Holy Father sits on a throne and wears a crown and a dove emerges from his mouth.
The Calvary de Lambader	Plouvorn	The Prigent atelier carved the back to back statue of the Virgin Mary reversed to Mary Magdalene which is part of this calvary.
The Croix de Brondusval	Plouider	There are two Prigent sculptures of Saint Yves and Saint Fiacre on the calvary.
Calvary	Quimper	At Quimper's Église Locmaria is part of a calvary thought to have belonged to the priory. A Prigent atelier statue of the Virgin Mary back to back with Saint Peter has been preserved.

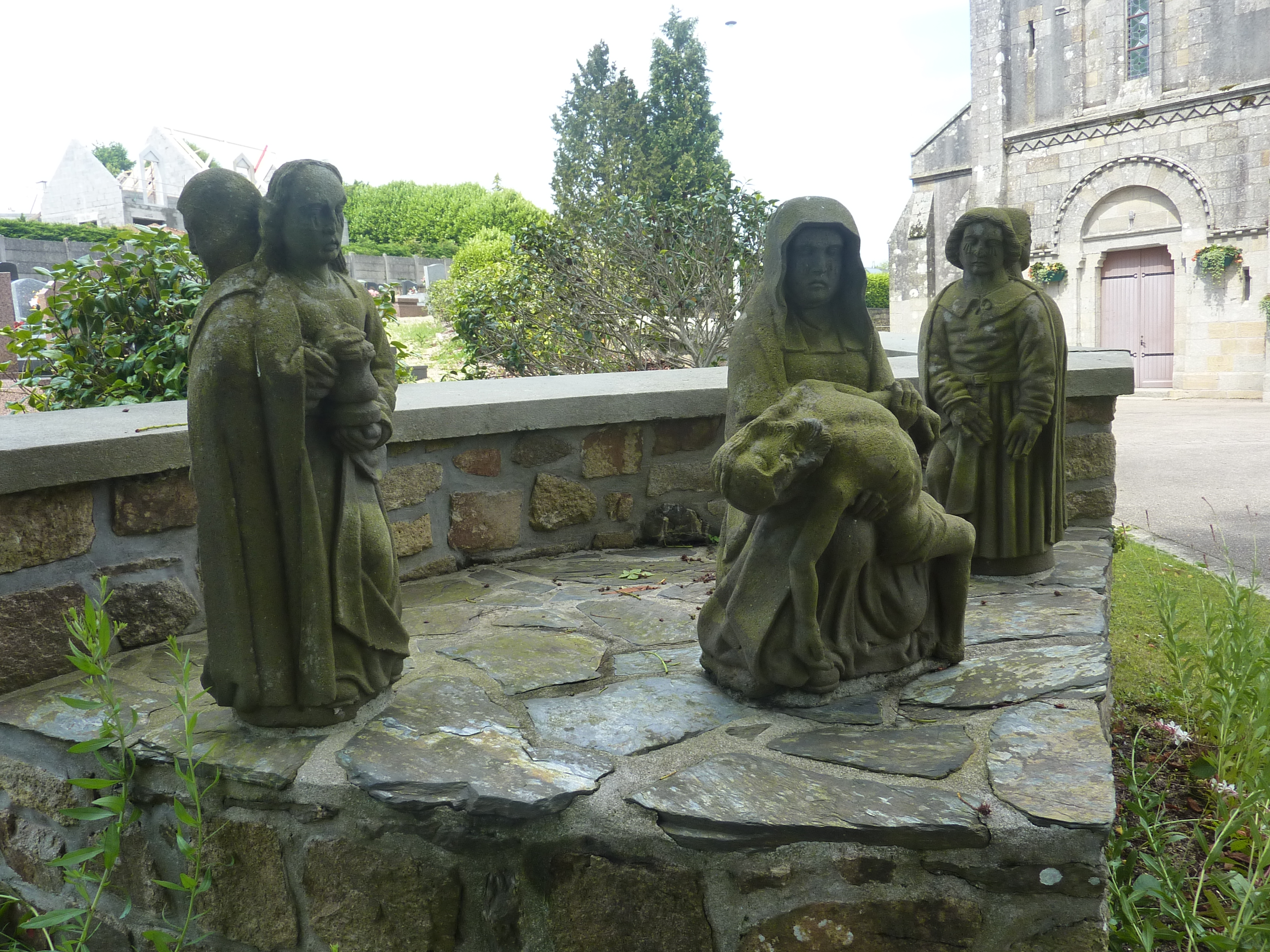
The remains of an old calvary stand in the grounds of La Forest-Landerneau's cemetery. See details above

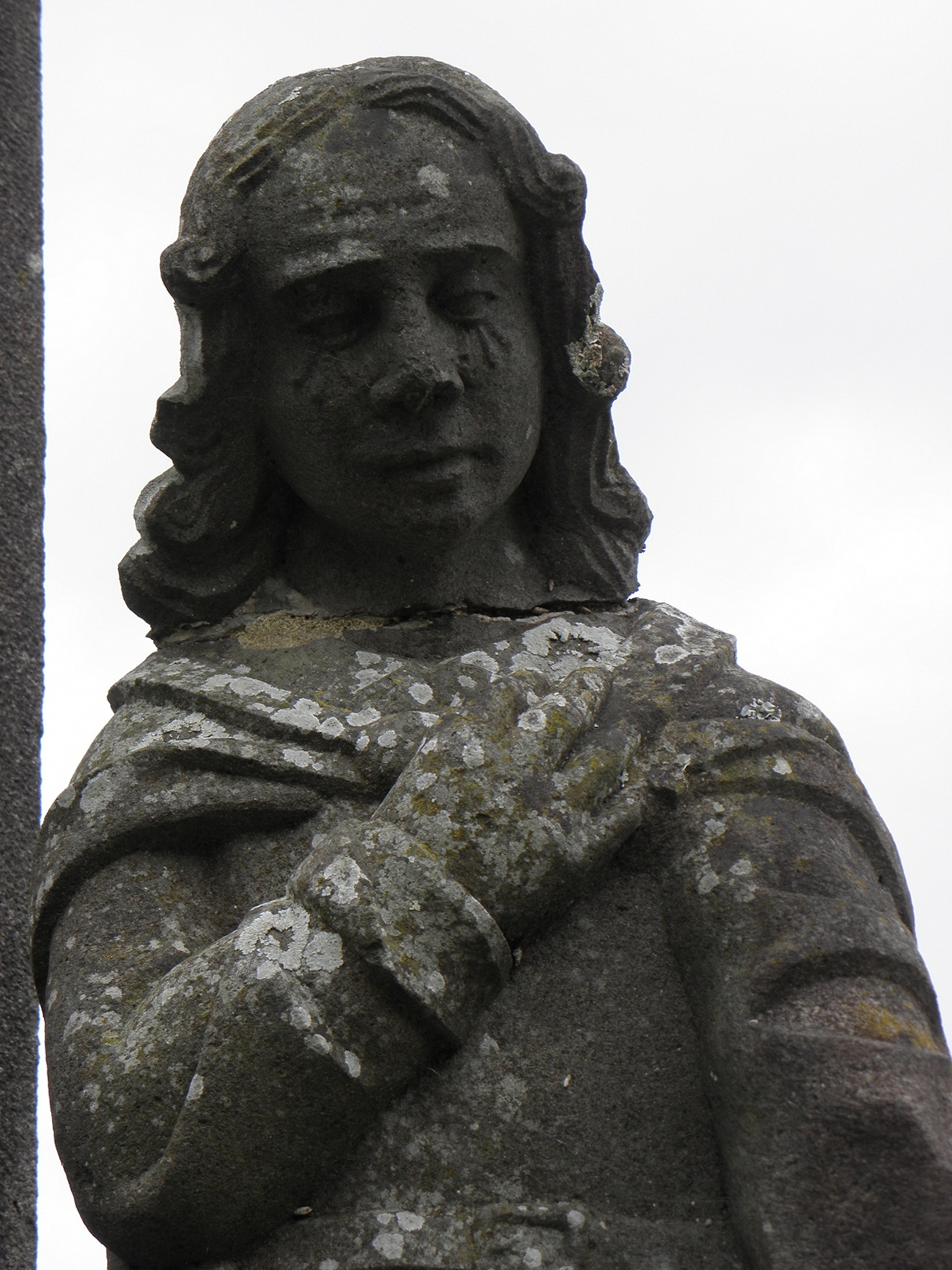
The calvary at Dinéault-John the Evangelist

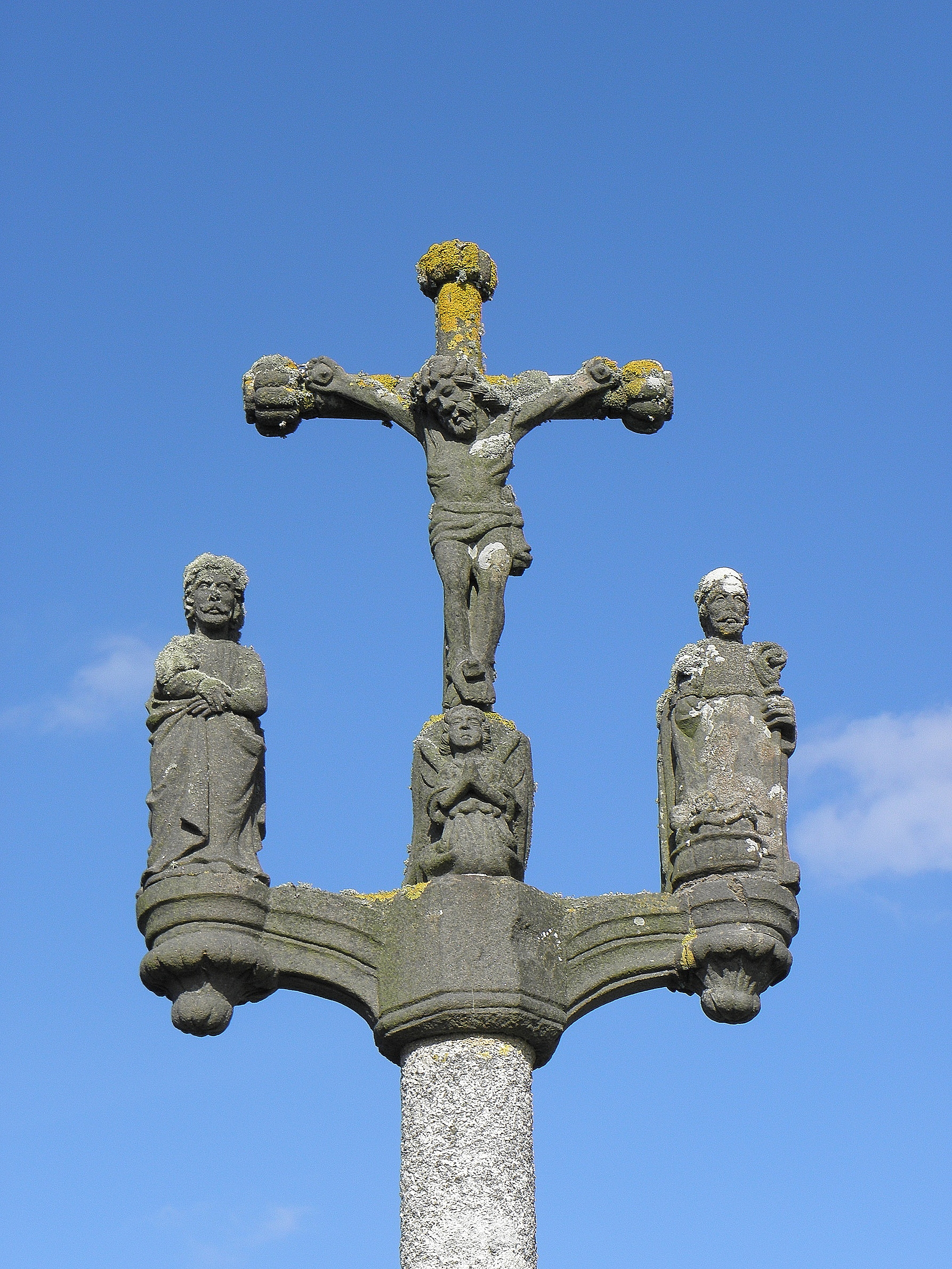
The calvary at Brignogan-Plages

== Miscellaneous ==
Type of sculpture	Location	Description
The gisant of Laurent Richard	Plouvien	The gisant of Laurent Richard can be seen at Plouvien in an arcade in the south side of the nave of Joseph Bigot's church of 1856, the église Saint Pierre et Saint Paul. The tomb was brought to Plouvien from the chapel of the Manor of Tariec which had been destroyed. The tomb is carved from kersanton stone and the base has six panels on each side and two panels at the top and bottom sides. Each panel contains a depiction of a person in mourning ("pleureuse"). Laurent Richard was the canon of Nantes cathedral and the rector of Cintré. There are two angels positioned by Richard's head and he lays full length, his hands clasped together in prayer. At his feet is the sculpture of an animal. It has lost its head but is thought to have been a deer. The gisant itself is attributed to the Prigent atelier but not the base with its sixteen carved panels.
Sculptures depicting the Virgin Mary with child	Basilique Notre-Dame du Folgoët	Bastien Prigent is attributed with two statues of the Virgin Mary with child which are located in the Basilique Notre-Dame du Folgoët. The first is positioned on the central console (bracket) in the tympanum over the entrance to the south porch. The Virgin Mary holds the baby Jesus in her left arm. The second statue is located to the left of the last window on the south façade. The Virgin Mary holds the baby Jesus and at her feet is a horned sea monster who she has clearly slain. Another statue of the Virgin Mary with child can be seen in the interior of the Locmaria-Lan chapel in Plabennec. This is attributed to Henry Prigent. There are also statues attributed to the Prigent atelier on the wall surrounding the Plabennec Parish close. These are of Saint Éloi and Saint Fiacre. Bastien Prigent's statue of the Virgin Mary in the tympanum over the entrance to the south porch of the Basilique Notre-Dame du Folgoët^^
The pietà	Plourin, Saint-Nic and Saint-Renan	Several pietà are attributed to the Prigent atelier. One stands in front of the Église Saint-Budoc at Plourin-Ploudalmézeau and involves six people. In the centre is the Virgin Mary seated and with her hands clasped together. On the extreme left of the group, John the Evangelist supports Christ's head. On the extreme right a female saint touches Christ's feet and in front of her is a pot of ointment. Mary Magdalene stands between the Virgin Mary and this female saint and wears a turban and on the other side of the Virgin Mary, the third Mary is praying. Bastien Prigent is thought to be the sculptor. All five people looking down at Christ's body have tears running down their cheeks. The pedestal carries the coat of arms of the Pilguen family of Keruzaouen. A second pietà can be seen at Saint-Nic in the ėglise Saint-Nicaise. Here John the Evangelist is kneeling, his hands clasped in prayer whilst the Virgin Mary holds her son's body in both hands. A female saint is to her left, in tears, and Mary Magdalene on the extreme right holds her pot of ointment. A third pietà is to be seen at Truro Cathedral in Cornwall and another in the gardens of the Le Jeune hospital at Saint-Renan
Sculptures depicting female saints	Brasparts, Dinéault, Logonna-Daoulas and Plouguerneau	Apart from the statue of Sainte Apolline at Pencran (the first work to be signed and dated by Henry Prigent, the date being 1555) and Sainte Pitère at Le Trehou, Henry and Bastien Prigemt are attributed with four other statues of female saints. The first is at Brasparts and is another statue of Sainte Apolline. It stands on a pedestal by the southern facade of the church. The saint holds an open book in her left hand. The statue is the work of Bastien Prigent. Statue of Saint Apolline by Bastien Prigent at Brasparts In the south transept of Dinéault's église Sainte Marie-Madeleine is a Henry Prigent statue of Sainte Marguerite. She kneels over a dragon she has slain. Henry Prigent is also attributed with the statue of Sainte Elizabeth at Logonna-Daoulas's Saint-Jean-Baptiste chapel. Finally at Plouguerneau's chapel Notre-Dame du Traon is a Henry Prigent statue of Saint Suzanne. Note: The French are very precise and indeed helpful in that female saints are described as "sainte" and male saints as "saint"
Sculptures depicting the Annunciation	Chateaulin and Pleyben	At Chateaulin's chapel Notre-Dame is a Henry Prigent depiction of the annunciation. It is carved from kersanton stone and still has traces of red ochre paint. In this composition the Virgin Mary is standing in front of a desk at prayer and next to her the angel ("Ange de l'Annonciation") is raising her right hand and carries a banner reading "AVE GRATIA PLENA". At the église Saint-Germain in Pleyben the bell-tower porch has a "Vierge de l'Annonciation" on the left of the porch's central niche and an "Ange de l'Annonciation" on the right of that niche. On the phylactery held by the angel is the inscription "AVE.MARIA.GR(ATIA>PLENA". The central niche contains a statue of Saint Germain and the inscription "EN L'HONNEUR DE DIEV ET DAE ET MONSIEVR S GERMAIN CESTE CROIX FVST COMECE 1555". Saint Germain and the annunciation statues are attributed to the Prigent atelier. See also Pleyben Parish close
Sculptures of monks	Lanarvily, Kernilis Plouguerneau and Irvillac	The Prigent atelier have been attributed with three statues depicting monks. At Lanarvily and Kernilis the statues are both in niches in the south transept; of the église Saint-Gouesnou in Lanarvily and the église Sainte-Anne in Kernlis. The statue of the monk in the église Sainte-Anne stands in a niche on the right side of the exterior of the south transept. The monk holds a book and a baton. The statue of the monk at Lanarvily (Possibly Saint Gouesnou) is located in a niche on the gable of the south transept. The third statue of a monk is to be seen on the west façade of the Notre-Dame de Lorette chapel at Coat-Nan in Irvillac. He holds a chalice. The pedestal is inscribed with the date 1566. At Plouguerneau's Notre-Dame-du Traon chapel there is a statue of a kneeling monk this from the Prigent atelier. The monk at Irvillac
Sculptures of individual male saints	Various	Several individual statues of male saints are attributed to the Prigent atelier. At the Trévarn chapel at Saint-Urbain on a plinth at the entrance to the "placitre" (a patch of grass next to the church) there is a statue depicting the hermit Saint Antoine. He carries a pilgrim's staff and a book. This work has been attributed to Henry Prigent. Statues of the same saint can be seen at Dirinon's ėglise Sainte-Nonne and Dinéault's ėglise Sainte-Marie-Madeleine, these attributed to Bastien Prigent. At Lopérec on the west façade of the Église Saint-Pėrec there is a statue of Saint Pérec. He strokes a doe with his left hand and holds an open book in the other. The attribution is to Henry Prigent. At Irvillac's ėglise Saint-Pierre the main door on the western side of the church has a statue of James the Greater, also attributed to Henry Prigent. At the Le Folgoët Église Notre-Dame a depiction of a group includes Saint Yves in the right side buttress of the west entrance, a rich man and a pauper known as Salaũn ar Foll, this on the first buttress on the south west of the west entrance. All three statues are attributed to Bastien Prigent. At Plogonnec there is a statue of Saint Thurlau over the west entrance of the ėglise Saint-Thurien attributed to the Prigent atelier as is the statue of Saint Éloi at the chapel of Locmaria-Lan at Plabennec. At Plouguerneau there is a statue of Saint They in the Notre-Dame de Traon chapel. He is depicted in the dress of an abbot with closed book and pilgrim's stick. This is a very early work by the atelier being dated 1527. Another statue of Saint Yves can be seen at Guipavas in the Saint Yves chapel. It is 1.05 metres high and also attributed to Bastien Prigent. Note: Saint Thuriau is also known under the name Thuriaf, Thurian, Thurien, Thuriave, Thivisien and Thivisian and was a bishop of Dol-de-Bretagne between 733 and 749. In the diocese of Quimper there are three parish churches dedicated to Saint Thuriau, those at Landivisiau, Plogonnec and Saint-Thurien. There is a commune of Saint-Thuriau in Morbihan, a Saint-Thurial in the Ille-et-Vilaine, and a Saint-Thurien in the Eure. Salaũn ar Foll at the ėglise Notre-Dame at Le Folgoët
Depictions of Jesus Christ (Apart from the depictions of the crucifixion on calvaries)	Le Folgoët	At the Basilica at Le Folgoët (ėglise Notre-Dame) there is a "Christ liė" by Bastien Prigent (the composition known as "Christ liė" is a depiction of Christ after he is condemned to be crucified. He either sits or stands alone, hands tied, awaiting the journey to Golgotha. He wears a crown of thorns). The sculpture here, with Jesus standing, is on a bracket to the left of the part of the stained glass window nearest to the west of the basilica. The piece exudes pathos. At Landerneau in a niche on the building known as the Sėnėchaussėe is a statue depicting the resurrected Christ. He is showing Saint Thomas his wounds which Thomas wanted to see with his own eyes having doubted the events at Golgotha
Stoup at Saint-Guėvroc chapel	Tréflez	This stoup ("bėnitier") was the first piece signed and dated by Bastien Prigent. The date was 1545.

== Note on the sculptor Fayet ==
Apart from "Le compagnon de Pleyben", who worked with the Prigent brothers on the monumental calvary at Pleyben, the sculptor known as Fayet also worked in the Prigent atelier and is best known for his work on the Calvary at Lopérec. Fayet worked with the atelier from 1552 to 1563. His style of sculpting was so similar to the Prigent brothers that it is sometimes difficult to tell their work apart. Like the two brothers he often added three tears to the faces of his subjects and their faces were oval in shape as were those of the Prigents.

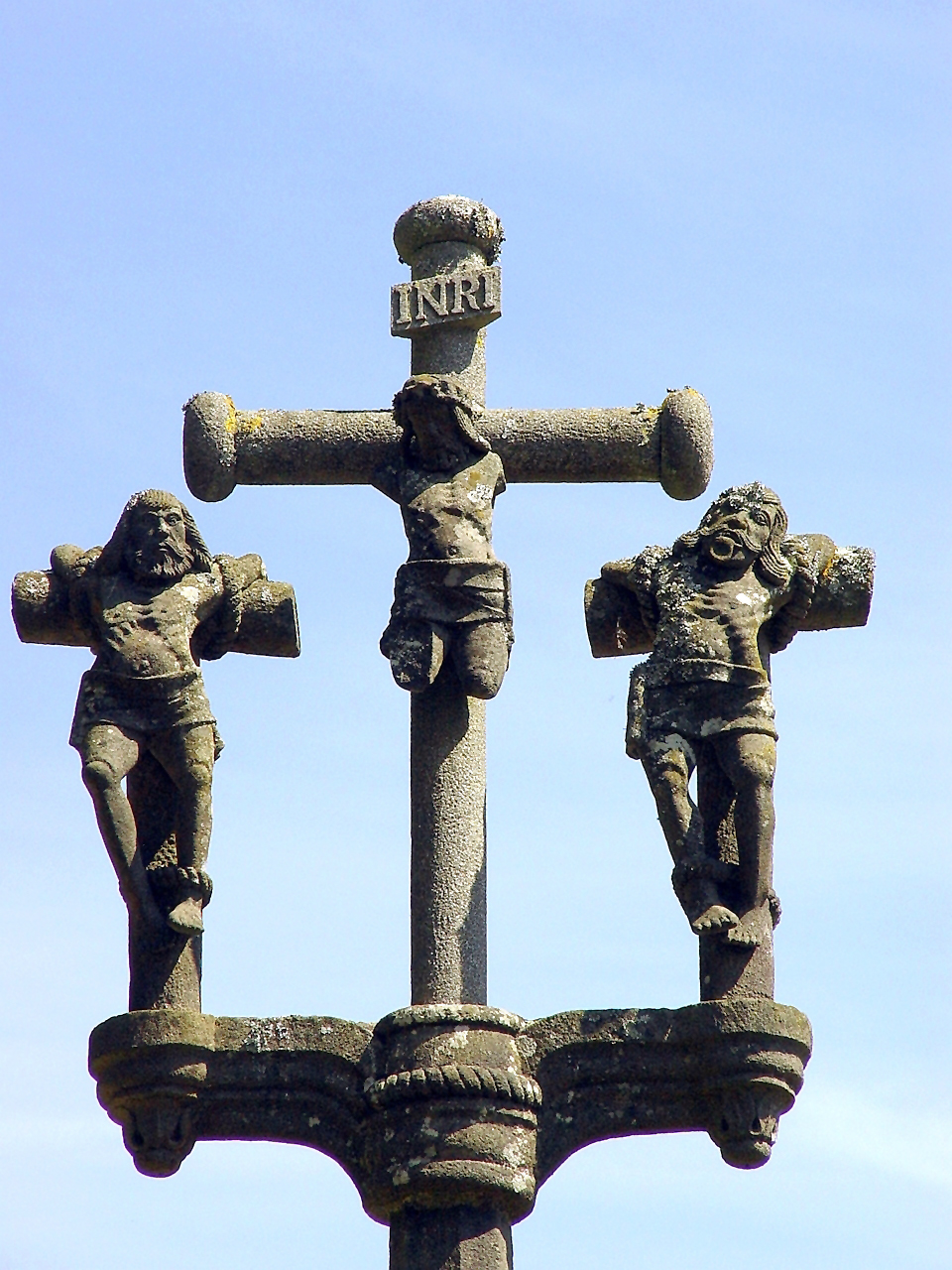
Fayet's limbless Christ at Irvillac

Other works by Fayet include those listed below.

Type of sculpture	Location	Description
Monumental Calvary	Pleyben	Fayet completed eight of the scenes depicted on the Pleyben calvary in sandstone (grés feldspathique).
Remains of a calvary	Le Folgoët	The remains of a calvary on the lawn of the Musée du Doyenné are attributed to Fayet. The sculpture is of Christ on the cross. He has lost arms and legs below the knee.
Remains of a calvary	Irvillac	The Coat-Nant calvary by the chapel Coat-Nant Notre-Dame de Lorette has the mutilated figure of Christ which is attributed to Fayet. The calvary is positioned over a fountain and is known as one of Roland Dorė's finest works. Fayet's statue of the crucified Christ has neither arms nor legs and was placed on the calvary in 1935.
Remains of a crucifix	Landerneau	The remains of a crucifix on the gable of the École du Trumeur is thought to be by Fayet. The figure of Christ, which could have come from a cross or a calvary, has lost both arms and legs below the knee.
Calvary in cemetery	Laz	Fayet was responsible for the back to back statues depicting the crucified Christ and an "Ecce Homo" and the banner on the shaft reading "Ecce Homo 1563".

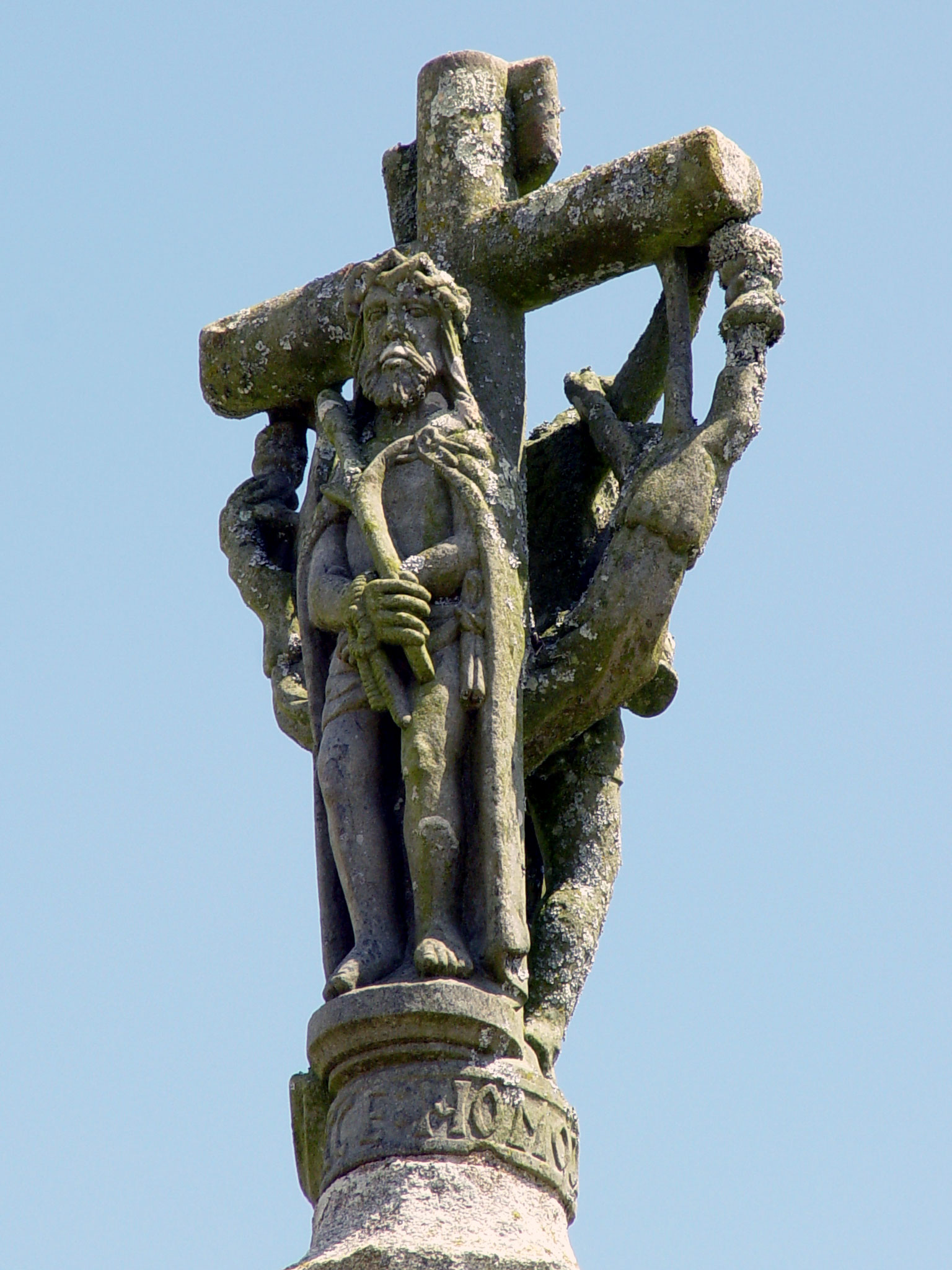
Fayet's "Ecce Homo" at Laz

Fayet also executed several sculptures of angels with their wings spread ("anges aux ailes dėployėes") which were positioned on either side of the crucified Christ and were collecting his blood into chalices. Examples are at Briec-de-l'Odet for the Saint-Adrien calvary, at Landudal, in the cemetery at Plounéour-Ménez, the Sainte-Barbe chapel at Ploéven, the ėglise at Plozévet and on the Kernaliou cross in Trégourez.
