= Saint-Nic =

Saint-Nic Sant-Vig
- Commune
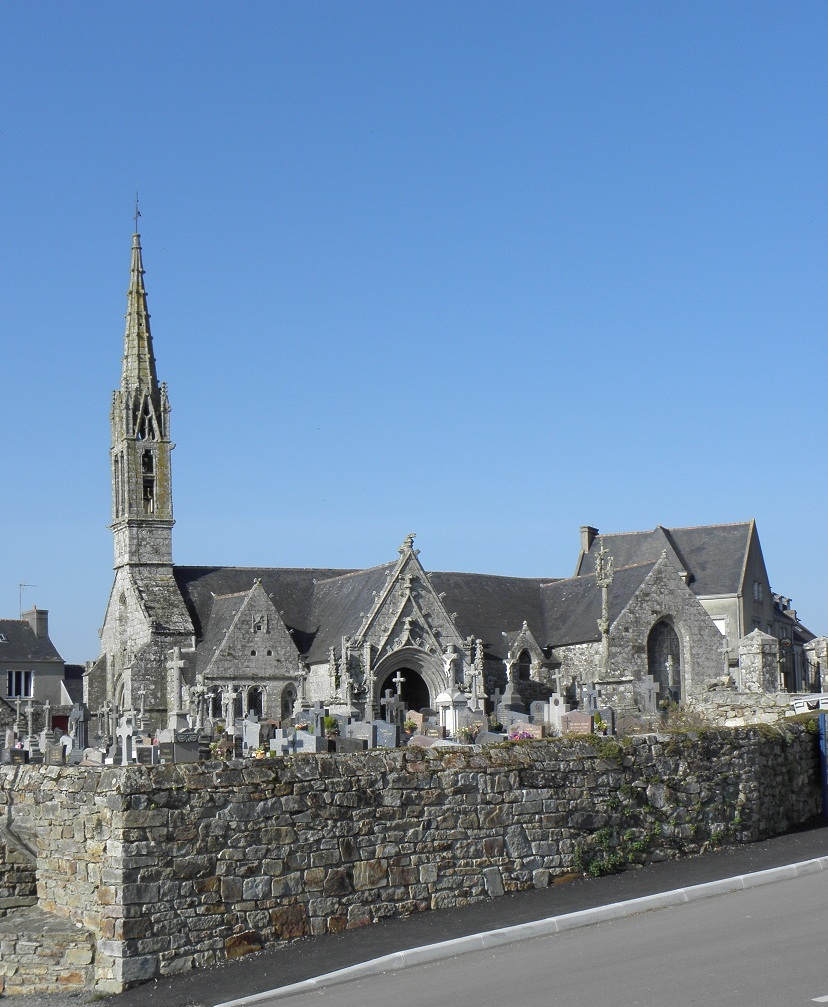
- The parish church in Saint-Nic
- Location of Saint-Nic
- Location within France Location within Brittany
- Coordinates: 48°12′11″N 4°16′53″W
- Country: France
- Region: Brittany
- Department: Finistère
- Arrondissement: Châteaulin
- Canton: Crozon
- Intercommunality: Pleyben-Châteaulin-Porzay

Government
  - Mayor (2020–2026): Annie Kerhascoet
- Area^{1}: 18.03 km^{2} (6.96 sq mi)
- Highest elevation: 299 m (981 ft)
- Lowest elevation: 0 m (0 ft)
- Population (2023): 753
  - Density: 41.8/km^{2} (108/sq mi)
- Time zone: UTC+01:00 (CET)
  - Summer (DST): UTC+02:00 (CEST)
- INSEE/Postal code: 29256 /29550
- ^{1} French Land Register data, which excludes lakes, ponds, glaciers > 1 km^{2} (0.386 sq mi or 247 acres) and river estuaries.

Saint-Nic (French pronunciation: [sɛ̃ nik]; Breton: Sant-Vig) is a commune in the Finistère department of Brittany in north-western France.

== Population ==
Inhabitants of Saint-Nic are called in French Saint-Nicais.

== See also ==
- Communes of the Finistère department
- List of the works of Bastien and Henry Prigent
