= List of the works of the Maître de Plougastel =

This is a listing/"catalogue raisonné" of the works of the Maître de Plougastel and his workshop between 1570 and 1621. The work includes calvaries and crosses, church decoration and some miscellaneous items. His best known work is the Calvary at Plougastel-Daoulas. He worked using kersanton stone. Little is known of the man himself. His work can be seen in the diocese of Léon, the northern part of the diocese of Cornouaille and in the Cap-Sizun area. His three main works are the Plougastel-Daoulas calvary erected between 1602 and 1604 and entirely his work, part of the porch at Guimiliau, and the calvary at Locmélar apart from the pietà and the statue of the Virgin Mary reversed with Mary Magdalene.

== Church decoration ==
| Type of sculpture | Location | Description|Notes |
|---|---|---|
| West façade | Confort-Meilars | The Maître de Plougastel and his atelier are attributed with the statues of the twelve apostles adorning the Église Notre-Dame's western façade. It was unusual for statues of the apostles to be place on the exterior of a church. Normally they were placed inside the porch. The western front of the Église Notre-Dame |
| Stoup (bėnitier) | La Martyre | An elaborate stoup can be found inside La Martyre's Église Saint-Salomon. Beneath the washbasin is a depiction of an angel surrounded by Corinthian columns. She holds a holy-water sprinkler in each hand. At the very top of the stoup Saint Michael is shown fighting the dragon. The stoup is inscribed with the date 1601. There is another stoup attributed to the atelier inside the south porch. This is decorated with an ankou holding a head. The atelier also decorated the outside of the ossuary with a depiction of Saint Paul-Aurėlien and a small angel kneeling. See also La Martyre Parish close. Both stoups are attributed to the Maître de Plougastel. The stoup inside the south porch |
| Porch decoration | Bodilis | The Maître de Plougastel and his atelier are attributed with work on the south and south west porches of the Église Notre-Dame. See also Bodilis Parish close. The work includes an "Angel of Annunciation" (The archangel Gabriel) in the left niche in the right side buttress of the exterior of the south porch and the Virgin Mary with child in the central niche of the same buttress. The Virgin Mary with child in a niche in the south porch buttress |
| West façade and other decoration | Primelin | The atelier added statues of the four evangelists to the west façade of the chapel Saint-Tugen, the statue of Saint Tugen to the south porch, five apostles to the gable, six apostles to the church interior, statues by the entry porch depicting Sainte Anne, God the Saviour and the Virgin Mary with child. They also executed a statue of Saint Jude in the sacristy, a "Christ liė" for the Arc de triomphe and a statue of Saint Tugen dressed as a bishop for the fountain. John the Evangelist at the Saint-Tugen chapel, Primelin |
| Porch decoration | Guimiliau | The atelier worked on the south porch of the Église Saint-Miliau. They executed the first four scenes in the porch piėdroits, all the angels in the voussure and the scene depicting Joseph asleep and the three masks in the architrave as well as fourteen masks decorating the buttress. In the porch interior they executed the two "termes gainės" (sculpture where only the upper section depicts head and bust and the lower section in not in human form but is effectively a carved pedestal) and the two busts, the stoup and the apostles Saint Peter and John the Evangelist. See also Guimiliau Parish close |
| Church statues | Saint-Thégonnec | The atelier are credited with the statues of Saint Thėgonnec and Saint Nicolas in niches in the bell-tower porch exterior of the Église Notre-Dame and a statue of Saint Peter inside the bell-tower porch. See also Saint-Thégonnec Parish close Statue of Saint Thėgonnec |
| Church statue | Tréguennec | The Maître de Plougastel is attributed with the statue depicting the Virgin Mary with child in the Église Notre-Dame. It is placed in a niche in the west façade. |
| Church statue | Saint-Urbain, Finistère | The Maître de Plougastel worked on a statue of a saint/bishop in the north transept of Saint-Urbain's church. |
| Church statue | Plogoff | For the Église Saint-Collodan, the Maître de Plougastel executed a statue of an apostle which is placed in a niche on the western façade of the church. Statue of apostle in niche at the Plogoff Église Saint-Collodan |
| Church statue | Landerneau | The Maître de Plougastel executed a statue of James the Greater for Landerneau's Église Saint-Houardon. He wears the pilgrim's hat with sea-shell as decoration. |
| Ossuary decoration | Saint-Servais, Finistere | The atelier are credited with a statue of John the Evangelist in a niche in the left buttress of the ossuary façade. See Saint Servais Parish close |
| Statue in chapel | Plougastel-Daoulas | There is a statue of Luke the Evangelist by the Maître de Plougastel on the north wall of the Saint-Trémeur chapel. Luke holds a closed book under his left arm and on his right shoulder is a phylactery which is no longer readable. He is accompanied by his attribute the bull. This statue was the only one by the atelier to be completely polychromed. The atelier also executed the bracket/shelf upon which the statue is placed, this decorated with the image of an angel. The atelier also executed a statue of the Virgin Mary with child in the Saint-Adrien chapel. |
| Altar decoration | Plouvorn | In the "Chapelle de Lambader" is an altar decorated by the atelier with three heads and on the outside of the "Chapelle Saint-Trėmeur du Manoir de Keruzoret" are two niched statues by the atelier, one depicts Saint Christopher and the other Saint Peter. |
| Statues inside church | Le Folgoët | The Maître de Plougastel is attributed with two statues in the Église Notre-Dame. One is the statue of the Virgin Mary with child called "Notre-Dame du Folgoët". This is located in the south transept on the east wall between the wooden altar on the left and the "Autel des Anges" on the right. It is in a richly canopied niche. The other statue is a "Christ aux liens" located in the nave south west of the jube. See also List of the works of Bastien and Henry Prigent and List of works of the two Folgoët ateliers Notre-Dame du Folgoët |
| South porch statue | Lanneuffret | In a niche in the gable of the south porch of the Église Saint-Guėvroc there is a statue of Saint-Guévroc. He holds a closed book close to his chest. He is dressed as a monk. |

== Calvaries and crosses ==
Apart from the grand calvary at Plougastel-Daoulas, see Calvary at Plougastel-Daoulas, the Maître de Plougastel is attributed with four crosses and over twenty calvaries. The first of the four crosses can be seen in Morlaix. This is in the Saint-Charles cemetery and has three statues but the atelier only carved the crucifix. For two further crosses they added just the crucifix and the Virgin Mary with child and these are located at Saint-Thėgonnec to the south west of Kerorven and at Plougasnou at Kerangroas-Saint-Georges. The fourth cross is located at La Motte in Sizun and this involves the crucifix reversed with Saint Andrew. On this cross the two statues of the Virgin Mary and a deacon are not by the atelier. Details of some of the many calvaries are given below.

| Type of sculpture | Location | Description|Notes |
|---|---|---|
| Church calvary | Saint-Thégonnec | The Maître de Plougastel is credited with the crucifix and the statue of the Virgin Mary with child on the "Croix de Kerorven" known as "the Croas-ar-Garnisson". |
| Cemetery calvary | Saint-Sauveur | Only the angels praying and carrying chalices are by the Maître de Plougastel. On Saint-Sauveur's Croas de Pen-ar-Menez, the atelier executed the statues of a bishop reversed with the Virgin Mary and Mary Magdalene reversed with John the Evangelist. |
| Church calvary | Le Relecq-Kerhuon | The Maître de Plougastel executed the statues of John the Evangelist, the crucifix and the Virgin Mary. |
| Cemetery cross and others | Plougastel-Daoulas | The Maître de Plougastel is credited with work on the calvary in the cemetery. All the statuary is by them except for Roland Doré's crucifix. The atelier also worked on the calvary at the Saint-Adrien chapel, the calvary of the Sainte-Christine chapel and the calvary of the chapel Saint-Trémeur. Some calvary remains attributed to the atelier can also be seen in the Plougastel-Daoulas Musée de la Fraise. |
| Cemetery cross | Morlaix | On this cross in the Saint-Charles cemetery the atelier are attributed with the crucifix. |
| Church cakvary | Locmélar | The Maître de Plougastel is attributed with part of the statuary on the Locmélar church calvary, namely the resurrected Jesus and John the Evangelist reversed with Saint Peter and the good robber, the horse riding Longin, the crucifix, the "Christ lié" and the horse riding Stéphaton, apart from his head. He also carved the angels carrying chalices. The pietà, the Virgin Mary reversed with Mary Magdalene, the head of Stéphaton and the bad robber are by another workshop. See also Locmélar Parish close. The "Christ lié" at Locmélar |
| Calvary | Kersaint-Plabennec | Of the statues on the "Calvaire de Laven", the atelier were responsible only for the statues of Saint Yves and Saint Etienne as well as the pietà. The pietà has lost its head. Pietà on Calvaire de Laven" |
| Church calvary | Le Folgoët | Of the Notre-Dame Église's calvary only the crucifix is by the atelier and a blazon on the node. |
| Church calvary | Le Drennec | The statues on the church calvary depicting "Christ lié" and Mary Magdalene are not by the atelier but they are credited with the Le Drennec calvary's crucifix, the Virgin Mary reversed with Saint Yves, a pietà and John the Evangelist reversed with Saint Francis. There is a second calvary at the Locmazé chapel which involves Saint Yves reversed with John the Evangelist, the crucifix reversed with the Virgin Mary with child and Saint Nicolas reversed with the Virgin Mary. This dates to 1615 and is attributed to the atelier. |
| Church calvary | Plougar | The Kroas-Hir calvary has only an angel holding coats of arms by the Maître de Plougastel. |
| Church Calvary | Primelin | Some remains of an earlier calvary are to be found in the Primelin enclos and the Maître de Plougastel was also attributed with the angels bearing chalices on the entrance arch as well as the "Christ lié". |
| Church calvary | Guipronvel | The Maître de Plougastel was responsible for the statue of a priest reversed with John the Evangelist and Saint Peter reversed with the Virgin Mary as well as the Virgin Mary with child and the four evangelists, one positioned by the shaft of the cross and the others in niches in the pecestal. The crucifix is modern and what is left of the original crucifix is kept in a niche in the porch. |
| Chapel calvary | Le Drennec | The Maître de Plougastel is credited with the calvary at the "Chapelle de Locmazé". The statues are of Saint-Hervé reversed with John the Evangelist, the crucifix reversed with the Virgin Mary with child and Saint Nicholas reversed with the Virgin Mary. The date 1615 is inscribed on the calvary. Also at Le Drennec the church calvary is mostly the work of other ateliers but the Maître de Plougastel is credited with the crucifix, the Virgin Mary, Saint Yves, a pietà, John the Evangelist and Saint Francis. They are also credited with a female but unidentified saint on the right of the calvary's shaft. |
| Calvary | Guimaëc | The Maître de Plougastel is attributed with the calvary at the "Chapelle Christ". They executed the crucifix, a statue of Christ in his robe, Mary Magdalene reversed with the Virgin Mary, a "Christ liė" reversed with John the Baptist and Saint Barbara reversed with John the Evangelist. Add usual croix de finistere link. There is another calvary in the Guimaëc cemetery and only the crucifix and the pietà are accredited to the atelier. The calvary at Guimaëc |
| Calvary in cemetery | Gouesnou | The Maître de Plougastel executed statues of the Virgin Mary and the crucifix reversed with Saint Margaret and John the Evangelist. |
| Calvary | Plougasnou | Of the Plougasnou "Croix de Kerangroas-Saint-Georges" the Maître de Plougastel is attributed with the crucifix reversed with the statue of the Virgin Mary with child and the depiction on the node below of Sainte Veronica with her veil, the five wounds suffered by Christ during the crucifixion and a priest with chalice, all dating to 1588. The shaft of the cross dates to 1422. The Maître de Plougastel also worked on the Corran calvary executing statues of John the Evangelist, the crucifix reversed with Saint Peter and the Virgin Mary. |
| Church calvary | Trézilidé | Most of the statuary on this calvary is by Roland Doré but the statue of John the Evangelist back to back with a bishop is attributed to the atelier. The calvary at Trézilidé. The Maître de Plougastel's depiction of a bishop can be seen on the left side of the pietà. John the Evangelist would be on the reverse side of this bishop |
| Calvary | Guiclan | Only the crucifix of the "Calvaire de Kerhervé" is by the Maître de Plougastel. |
| Calvary | Sizun | The Maître de Plougastel was the sculptor of the crucifix and Saint Andrew only. |

== Miscellaneous ==
| Type of sculpture | Location | Description|Notes |
|---|---|---|
| Part of crucifix | Guipronvel | In a niche in the porch interior of the Église Notre-Dame de Bonne Nouvelle are the remains of a crucifix attributed to the Maître de Plougastel. |
| Part of cross | Guipavas | In the church presbytery there is a statue of the Virgin Mary with child that came from a cross at Lestaridec. |
