= Guimaëc =

Guimaëc Gwimaeg
- Commune
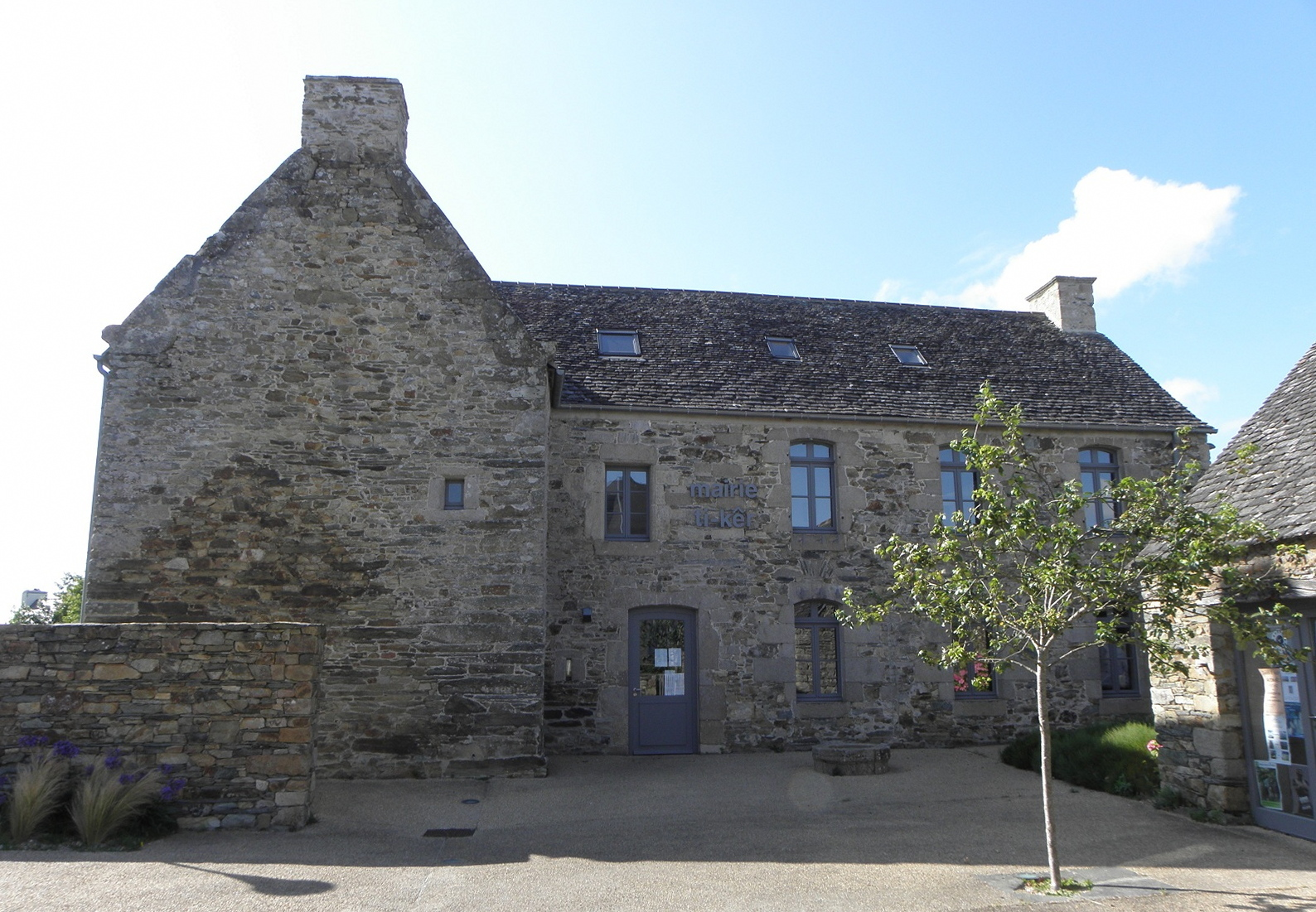
- The town hall in Guimaëc

- Coat of arms
- Location of Guimaëc
- Location within France Location within Brittany
- Coordinates: 48°40′04″N 3°42′27″W
- Country: France
- Region: Brittany
- Department: Finistère
- Arrondissement: Morlaix
- Canton: Plouigneau
- Intercommunality: Morlaix Communauté

Government
  - Mayor (2020–2026): Pierre Le Goff
- Area^{1}: 18.73 km^{2} (7.23 sq mi)
- Highest elevation: 117 m (384 ft)
- Lowest elevation: 0 m (0 ft)
- Population (2023): 982
  - Density: 52.4/km^{2} (136/sq mi)
- Time zone: UTC+01:00 (CET)
  - Summer (DST): UTC+02:00 (CEST)
- INSEE/Postal code: 29073 /29620
- ^{1} French Land Register data, which excludes lakes, ponds, glaciers > 1 km^{2} (0.386 sq mi or 247 acres) and river estuaries.

Guimaëc (French pronunciation: [ɡimaɛk]; Breton: Gwimaeg) is a commune in the Finistère department of Brittany in north-western France.

== Population ==
Inhabitants of Guimaëc are called in French Guimaëcois.

== Breton language ==
The municipality launched a linguistic plan concerning the Breton language through Ya d'ar brezhoneg on 22 December 2004.

== See also ==
- Communes of the Finistère department
- List of the works of the Maître de Plougastel
