= Plouvorn =

Plouvorn Plouvorn
- Commune
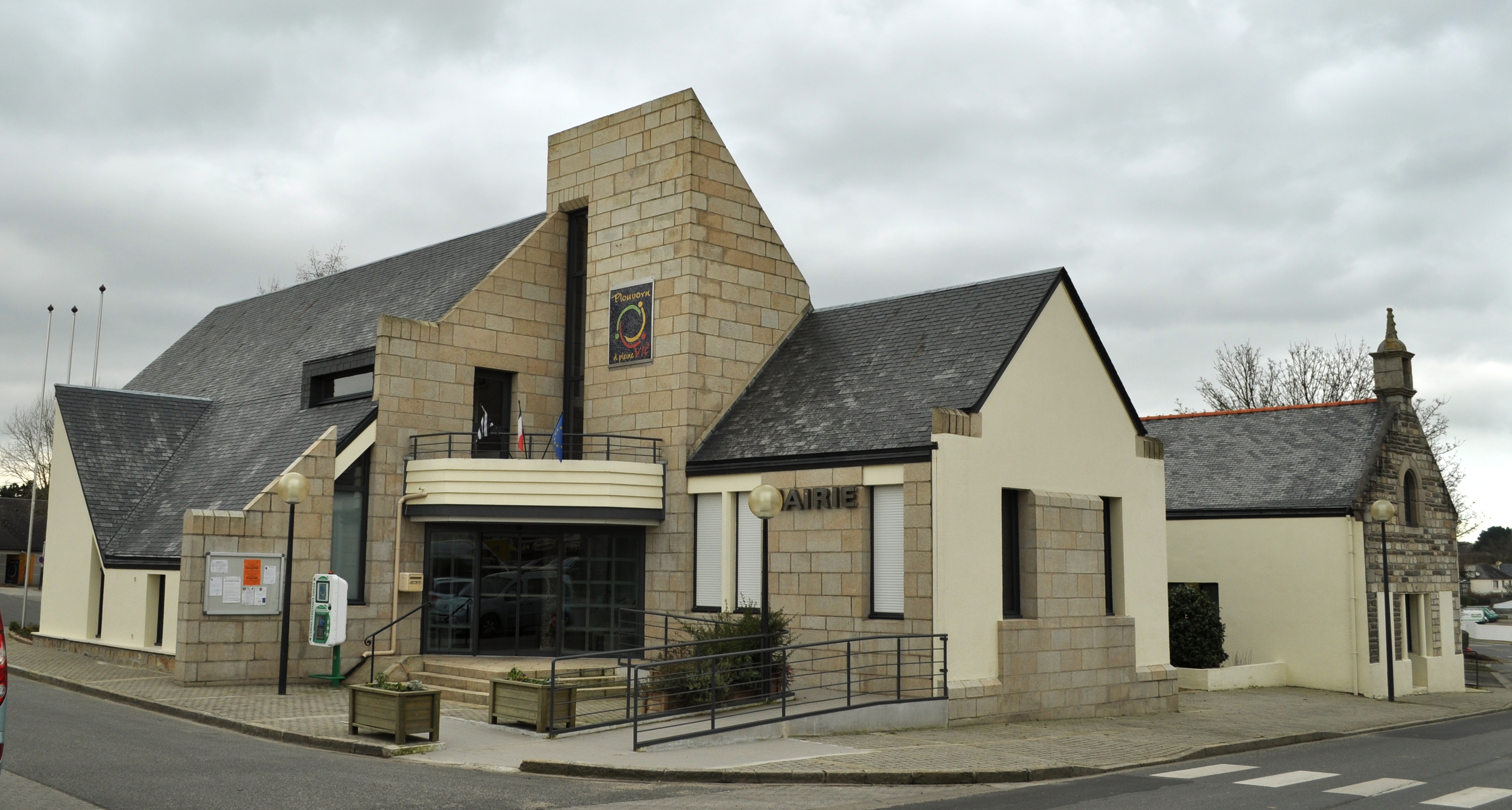
- Town hall
- Location of Plouvorn
- Location within France Location within Brittany
- Coordinates: 48°34′50″N 4°02′11″W
- Country: France
- Region: Brittany
- Department: Finistère
- Arrondissement: Morlaix
- Canton: Landivisiau
- Intercommunality: Pays de Landivisiau

Government
  - Mayor (2020–2026): Gilbert Miossec
- Area^{1}: 35.44 km^{2} (13.68 sq mi)
- Highest elevation: 126 m (413 ft)
- Lowest elevation: 29 m (95 ft)
- Population (2023): 2,916
  - Density: 82.28/km^{2} (213.1/sq mi)
- Time zone: UTC+01:00 (CET)
  - Summer (DST): UTC+02:00 (CEST)
- INSEE/Postal code: 29210 /29420
- ^{1} French Land Register data, which excludes lakes, ponds, glaciers > 1 km^{2} (0.386 sq mi or 247 acres) and river estuaries.

Plouvorn (French pronunciation: [pluvɔʁn]; Breton: Plouvorn) is a commune in the Finistère department of Brittany in north-western France.

== Population ==
Inhabitants of Plouvorn are called in French Plouvornéens.

Historical population
Year	Pop.	±% p.a.
1968	2,619	—
1975	2,525	−0.52%
1982	2,700	+0.96%
1990	2,584	−0.55%
1999	2,573	−0.05%
2007	2,760	+0.88%
2012	2,795	+0.25%
2017	2,870	+0.53%
2023	2,916	+0.27%
Source: INSEE

== Breton language ==
In 2008, 9.92% of primary-school children attended bilingual schools, where Breton language is taught alongside French.

== See also ==
- Communes of the Finistère department
- List of the works of the Maître de Plougastel
