= Calvary at Plougastel-Daoulas =

Coordinates: 48.3739°N 4.3701°W

The Calvary of Plougastel-Daoulas in the arrondissement of Brest comprises a raised octagonal pedestal made from the yellow granite of Logonna-Dāaoulas, flanked by four thick arched buttresses. All the sculptural work is by the Maître de Plougastel except the horseman on the left of the crucifix which is by Millet. It is a listed historical monument since 1889.

== Description ==
Below the top of the pedestal and running around it is a moulded cornice on which are placed a further series of statues carved from the bluish stone from Kersanton. Three crosses rise from the pedestal, the central cross having two crosspieces/bars and the crosses on the left and right bearing the two thieves crucified alongside Jesus. Around these crosses and on the surface of the pedestal are further statues. In total, there are 182 statues carved from Kersanton stone which are placed in groups to form 28 tableaux depicting scenes from the life of Christ. The Breton legend "Katell Kollet" features in one tableau when she is shown as one of those unfortunate souls writhing in the mouth of hell.

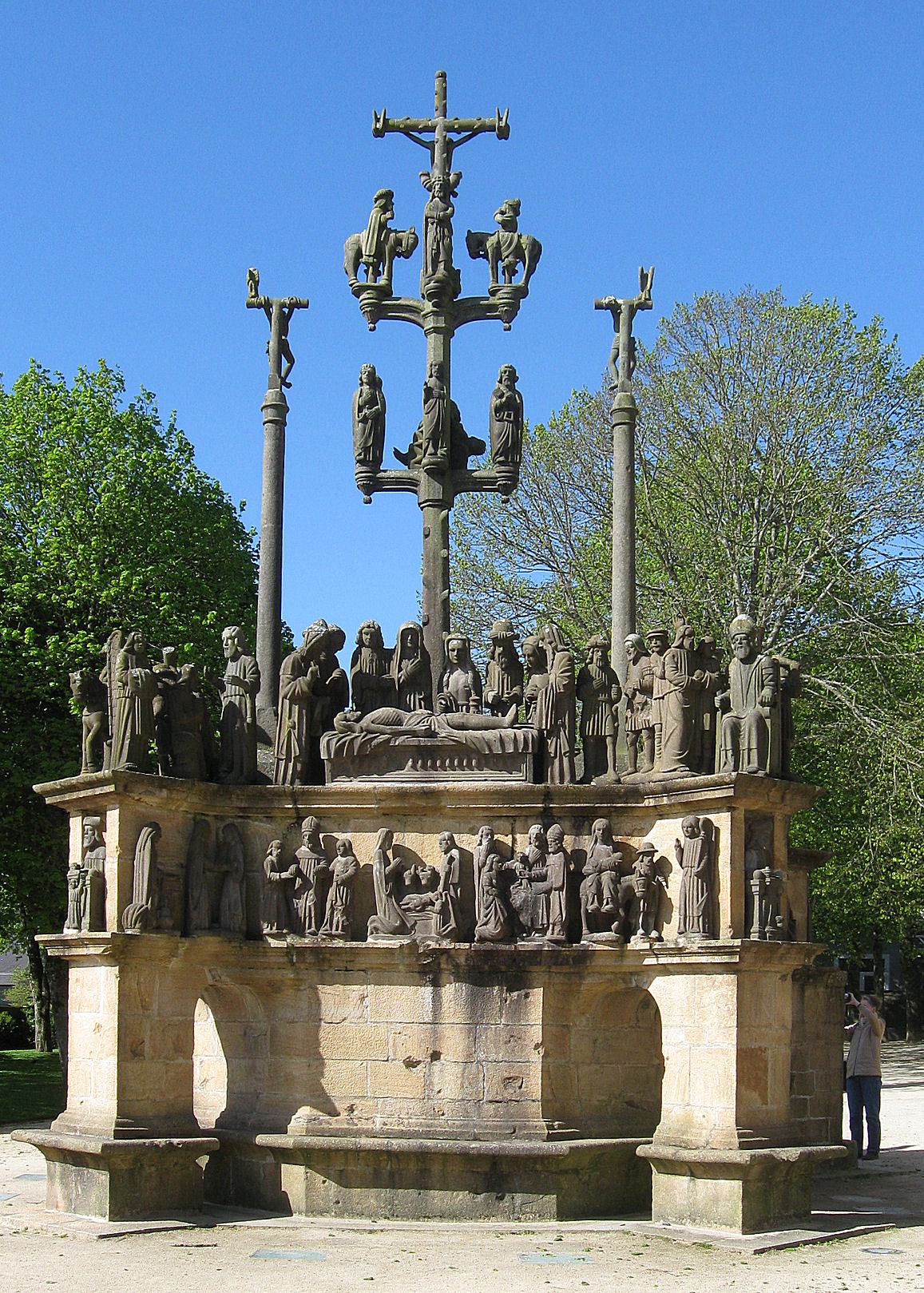
The Calvary at Plougastel-Daoulas seen from the eastern side. In the centre of the pedestal's upper surface, Christ is being prepared for burial (the "mise au tombeau") with Nicodemus, Joseph of Arimathea, Mary Cléophas and Gamaliel in attendance. A man stands holding a linen shroud. The Virgin Mary, disturbed by what she sees before her, is being supported by John the Apostle and Mary Magdalene holds her pot of oil. On the left of the "mise au tombeau" we see the Angel of the Annunciation followed by Jesus being baptized. Then to the right of the "mise au tombeau" we see a soldier and a Jew following Jesus into the presence of a High Priest. On the cornice below we can see from left to right the Angel of the Annunciation knelt at a prie dieu, the Visitation (Christianity), Mary and Joseph's marriage, the Nativity of Jesus, Jesus' circumcision and the flight into Egypt. Note the two arched buttresses with Matthew the Apostle and his angel on the left side buttress and Mark the Evangelist and his lion on the right side buttress. We are seeing the reverse side of the three crosses

== History of the calvary ==
What was an "enclos paroissial" was hit by bombing during the 1944 Liberation of France and the Calvary is really all that is left. The parish church of Saint-Pierre, which had been built in 1870 to replace the existing 17th-century church, was left in ruins and ultimately rebuilt in 1950. The Calvary had been built between 1602 and 1604 to mark the end of the bubonic plague epidemic of 1598 and has been classified as a "monument historique" since 1889. The Calvary stands in the centre of Plougastel-Daoulas, just by the parish church. The name of the Calvary in Breton translates as the "Cross of the Plague".

It was on 23 August 1944 that the area was bombarded by the American forces as they advanced towards Brest. Several of the statues on the Calvary were badly damaged, as were the three crosses. John D. Skilton, an Army Officer and a curator at the Washington Museum in civilian life, was in Plougastel-Daoulas at the time of the bombing, saw the damage done and resolved to restore the Calvary. When back in the USA, he formed the "Plougastel Calvary Restoration Fund Inc" to raise the funds needed for the Calvary's restoration and, sufficient funds having been raised, the restoration started in 1949 under the direction of the Ministère des Beaux-Arts et des Monuments Historiques who used the services of the sculptor Millet.

Further restoration was carried out between 2003 and 2004. The Calvary is 10 metres high. The various scenes depicted are arranged along the lines of the cardinal points. The scenes relating to the birth of Christ and his burial are grouped on the eastern side, whilst on the northern side are scenes dealing with Christ's suffering. On the southern side the scenes deal with Passover, (the "Last supper"), Jesus' washing of Peter's feet and the "chemin de croix" (the path to Calvary). On the western side we encounter scenes of Christ's death and resurrection.

== The depictions of the four apostles on the buttresses ==
In the niches on the face of each of the four buttresses are statues of the four evangelists. They sit in armchairs writing at desks and three wear barettas or the hats worn by doctors. Each is accompanied by their traditional attribute. Matthew the Apostle appears with an angel, Mark the Evangelist with a lion, Luke the Evangelist an ox and John the Evangelist an eagle.

== The west face of the Calvary ==
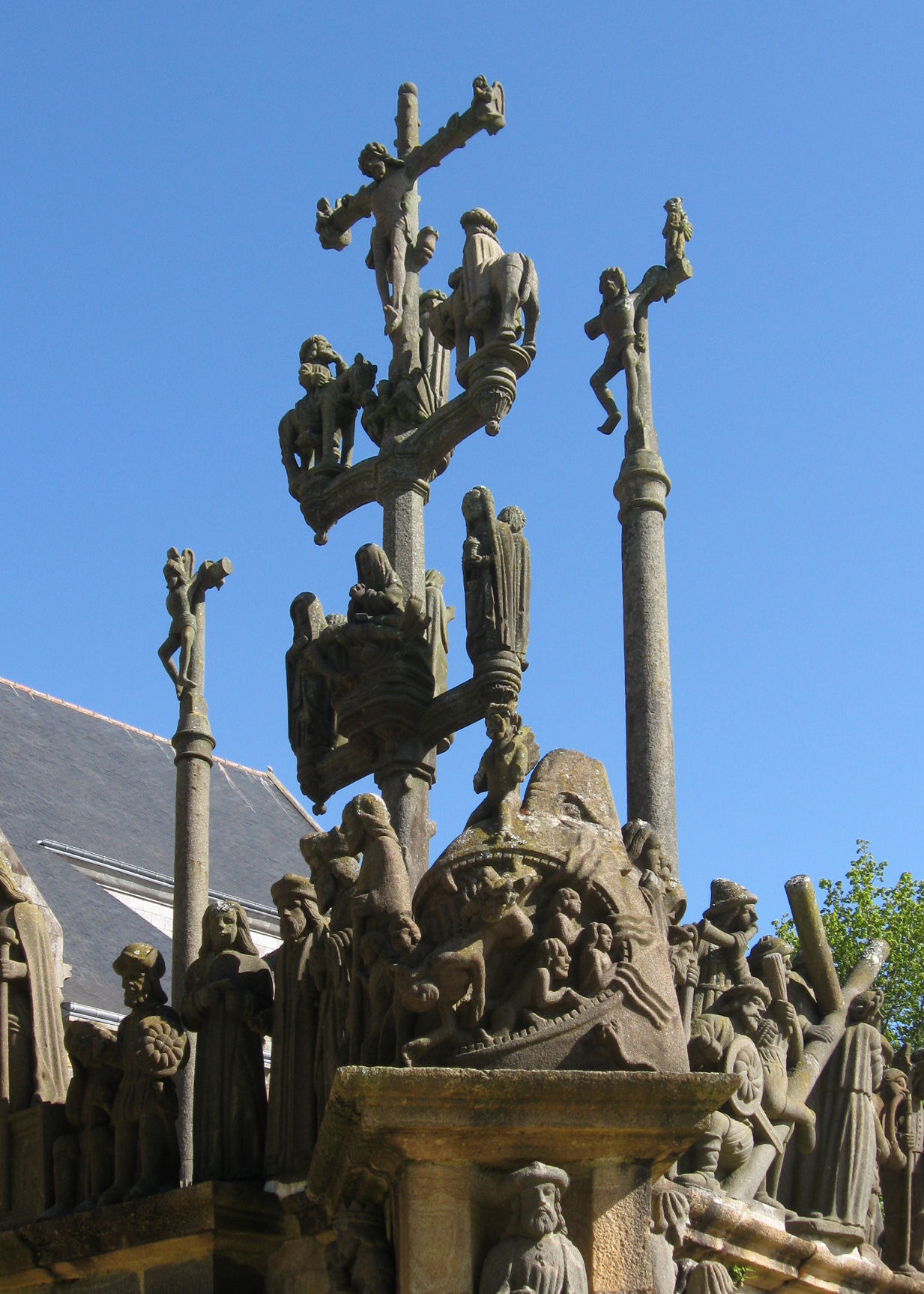
The mouth of hell has already taken several lost souls as Jesus leads away two that he has rescued.

The west face of the Calvary deals with the "résurrection".

The western face is slightly larger and higher than the other three faces. It is dominated by a depiction of the resurrected Christ which is placed above a large arch with pillars on either side in which there is a form of altar. This arch interrupts and divides the cornice and to the left of this part of the Calvary there is a stairway leading up to the pedestal's platform. Priests would use this stairway to access the platform and deliver sermons. Another feature of this face of the Calvary is that there is extra space over each buttress so that individual statues can be placed on them.

The west facing cornice is in two sections, divided by the arch. On the left-hand side of the arch, after a statue of a bishop and Saint John and his attribute the eagle on the buttress, we have a scene showing Jesus' entry into Jerusalem. On the right hand side of the arch we have a depiction of the Adoration of the Magi.

- The entry into Jerusalem. Jesus rides on an ass and is accompanied by five of his disciples, one of whom holds a book. A small figure emerges from the nearby tower and lays a rug in Jesus' path whilst another, his hands clasped together, stands in the door of the fortress of Jerusalem, here represented by a small crenelated tower.
- The adoration of the Magi. The Virgin Mary sits holding the baby Jesus and Joseph is behind her. The first king is on his knees, has placed his crown on the ground and offers his present in a sort of square chalice. The other two kings stand, their crowns on their heads and hold vases containing their gifts. One's costume is completed by a small cross and type of coif whilst the other has a cord around his shoulders from which a cross is suspended. The cow and the ass are at Joseph's side.

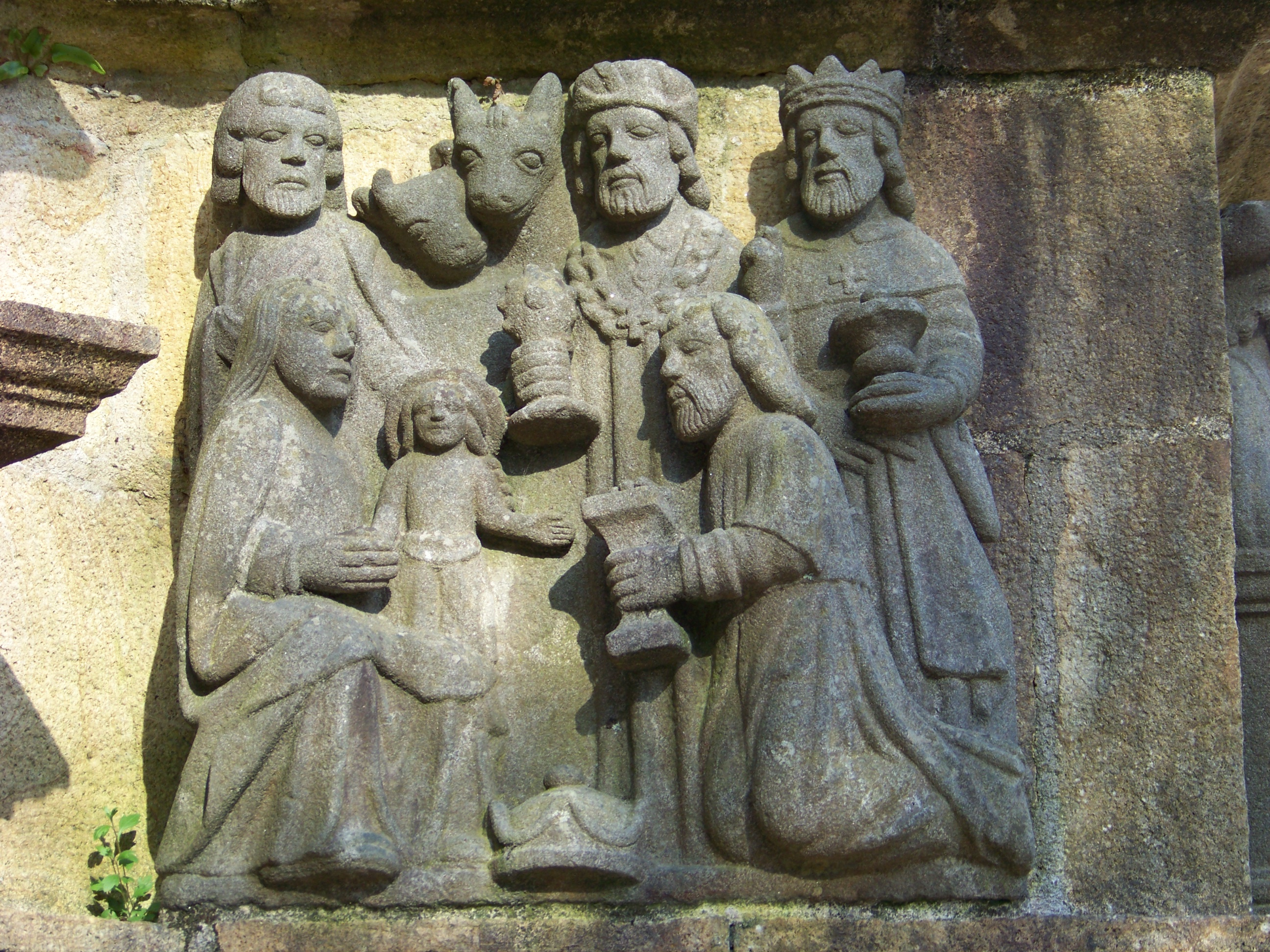
The three wise men present their gifts with Mary and Joseph looking on. The two cattle remind us that the birth has taken place in a stable.

On the surface of the west face of the pedestal and from left to right we first see the devil himself, a frightening figure. He is trying to tempt Jesus who is appearing before Pontius Pilate. Next, we are shown the resurrected Christ who has emerged from the tomb. Here the date 1604 is inscribed. Next, we see the young Jesus engaged in discussions with the two lawyers. Then Jesus is shown holding the hands of two lost souls who he has rescued from the open mouth of hell ("Abandon all hope ye who enter here") from which flames emerge and other lost souls writhe in agony, including the legendary Kattell Gollet. A demon sits above the mouth orchestrating proceedings and another with horns is with the others in the mouth itself.

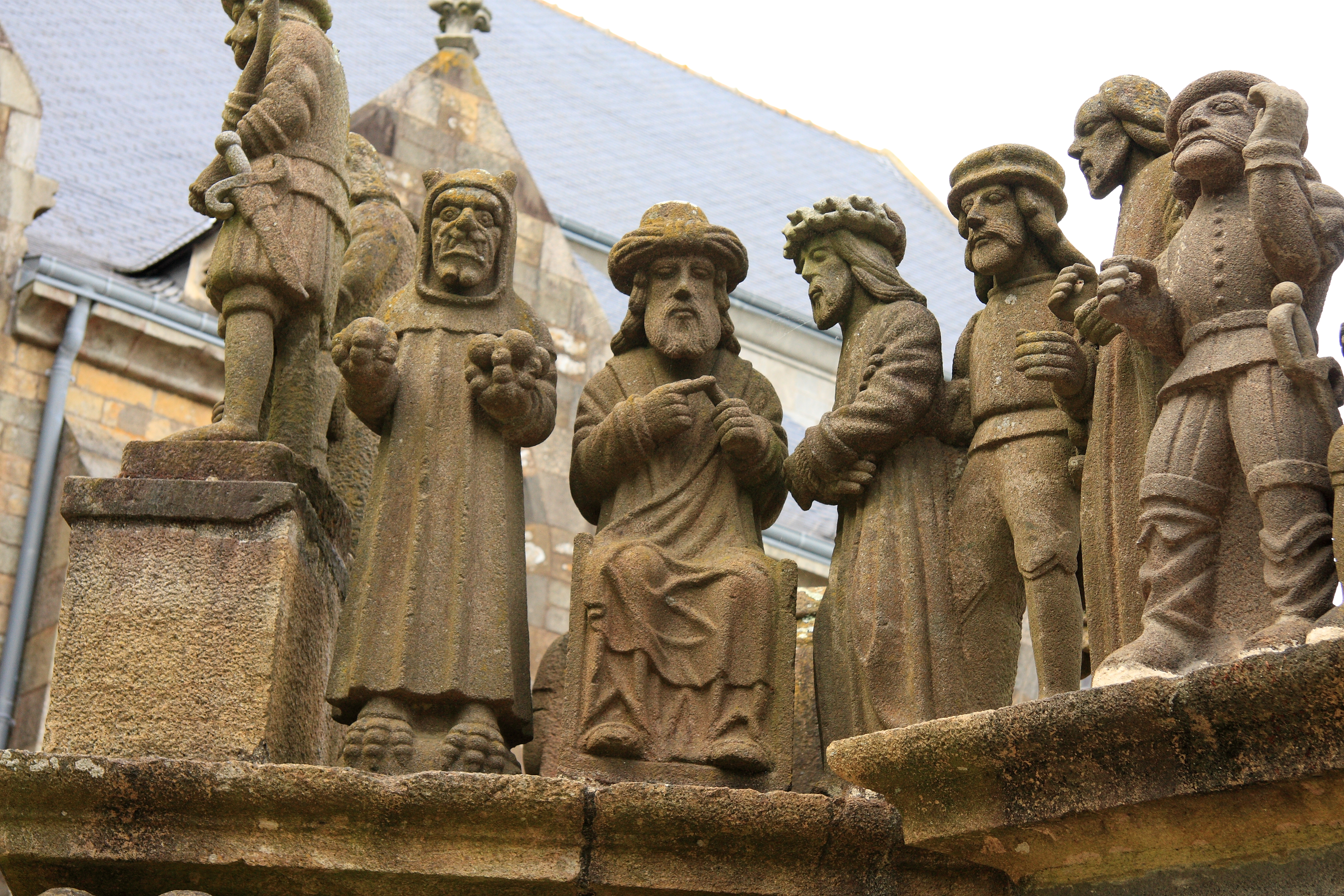
Jesus is led before Pontius Pilate by a soldier. Pilate is asking questions as shown by the fact that he touches his thumb with his left index finger. On the left is the devil himself and next to the soldier the figure of Jesus without the crown of thorns. The image of the devil and of Jesus are best seen as apparitions looking in on the scene of Jesus before Pontius Pilate.

- The devil, dressed in a monk's habit and with fearsome teeth, holds out some stones in his left hand and a globe in his right hand. He teases Jesus asking him to turn the stones into bread and telling Jesus, with reference to the globe, that he could be the ruler of the entire world if he chose to be so. Between the devil and the second image of Jesus we see Jesus wearing the crown of thorns, his hands bound and held by a soldier. He is appearing before Pontius Pilate who is seated and wears a turban. He touches his thumb with his left index finger to show that he is speaking. Then we see a second image of Jesus but without the crown of thorns. To understand this scene it is best to see the image of the devil and the image of Christ without the crown of thorns as apparitions and speaking across Pontius and that group.

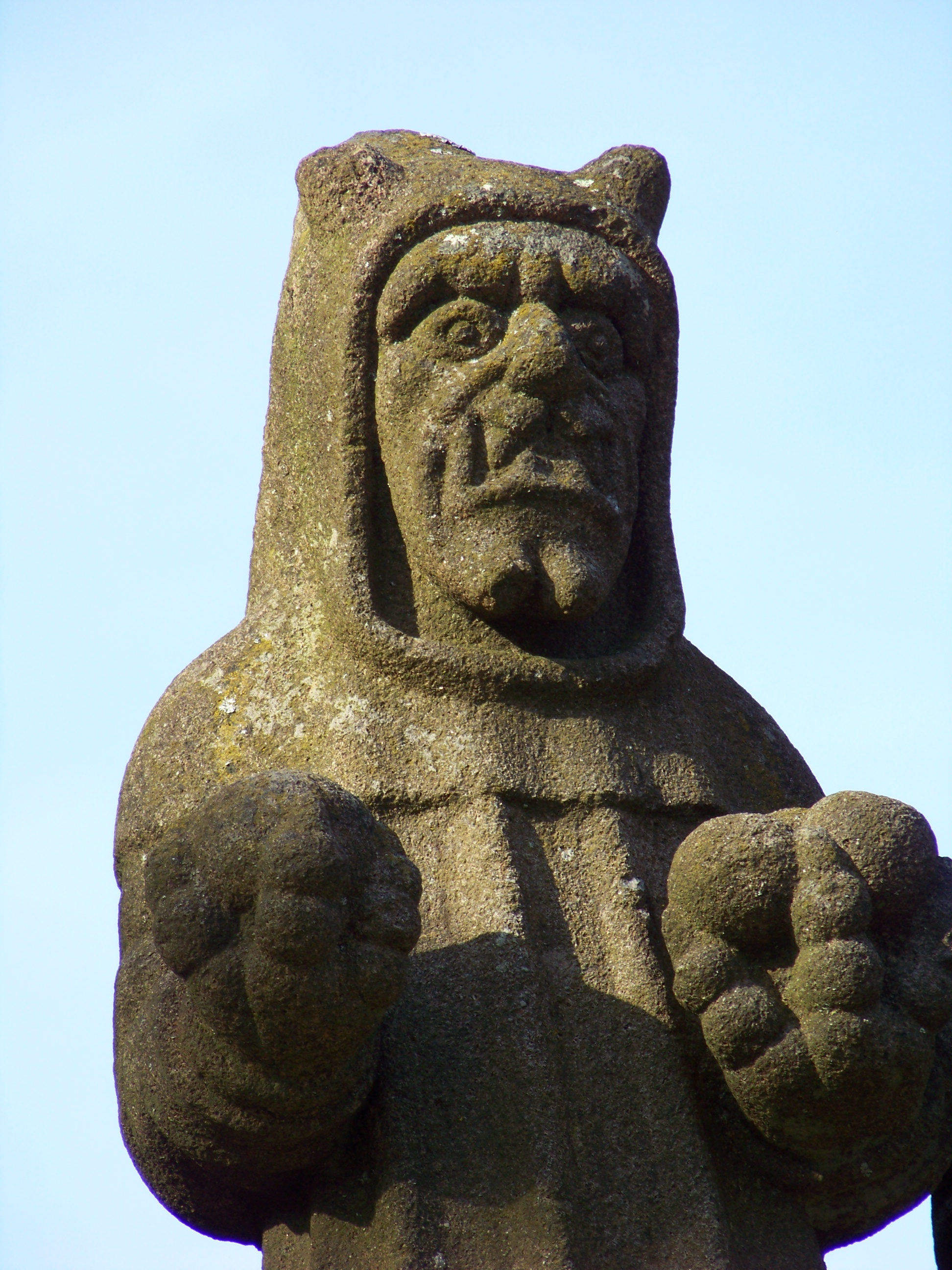
The devil himself.

- The risen Christ. By the simple device of making Jesus Christ's statue much taller than the surrounding statues, the sculptor underlines Christ's importance. He emerges from the tomb with a "pilgrims's staff" in his hand whilst he gives a blessing with the other. He is surrounded by four guards, two seated and two standing. All four are asleep. The arch contains an altar and statues of Saint Peter, Saint Sebastian and Saint Roch. Sebastion and Roch were regarded as saints who specialised in warding off disease so their veneration was important. The people feared another epidemic and wanted it avoided. Peter holds his key, Sebastian is depicted with arrows whilst St Roch prays on his knees. On the buttress to the right is Saint Luke and his attribute the ox.

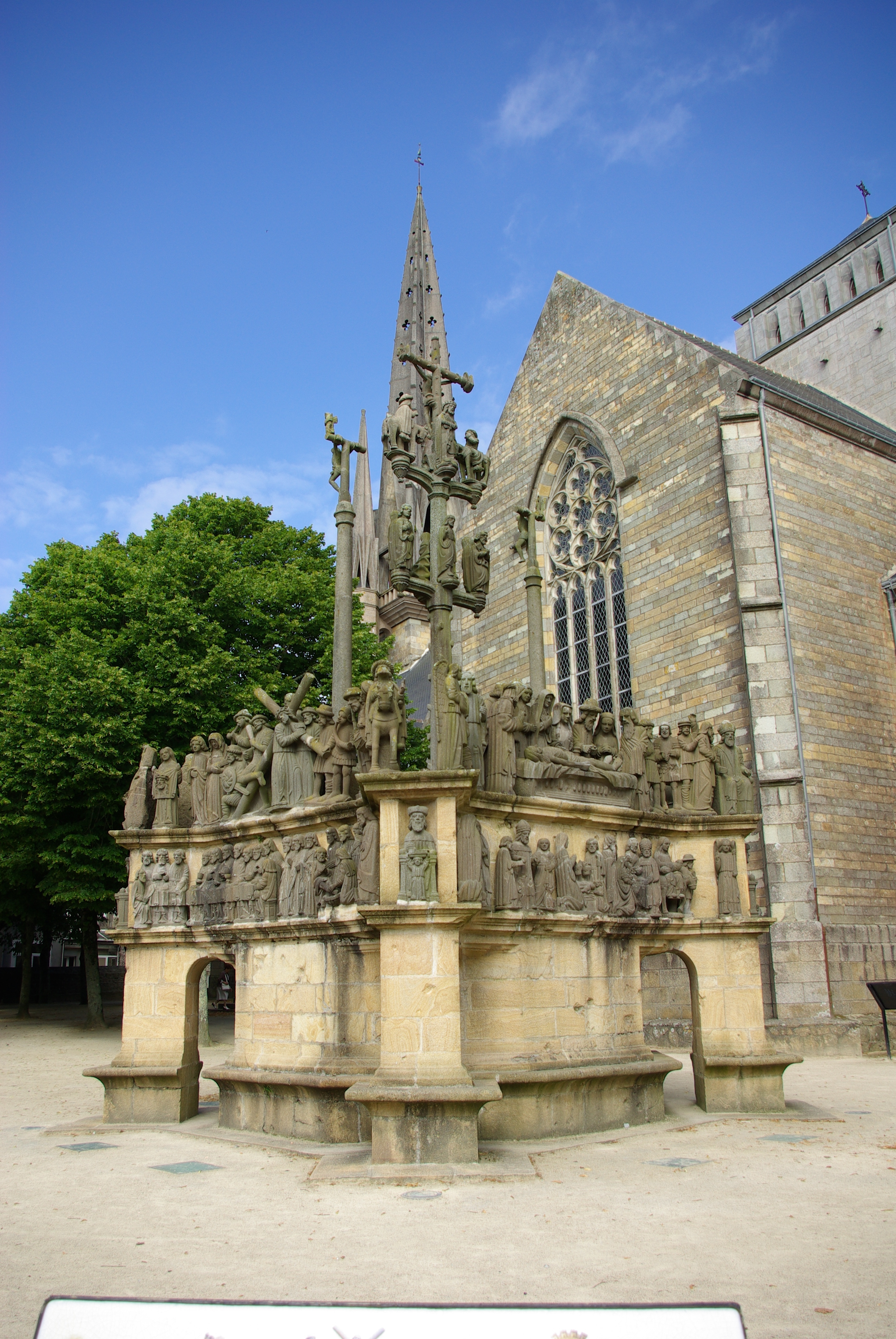
View of the Calvary. To the left of the buttress bearing the depiction of Saint Matthew we see depictions of Jesus' journey to Calvary carrying the cross and on the cornice below the Last Supper and the washing of Jesus' feet. On the right of the buttress, we see the "Mise au tombeau" preceded by John the Baptist baptizing Jesus, with an angel in attendance who is holding Jesus' robe, followed by Jesus being brought before the High Priest. Along the cornice we see the Annunciation with the Virgin Mary sat at a prie-dieu, the visitation, the marriage of Mary and Joseph, the circumcision, the flight to Egypt and the Archangel Gabriel, the Angel of the Annunciation.

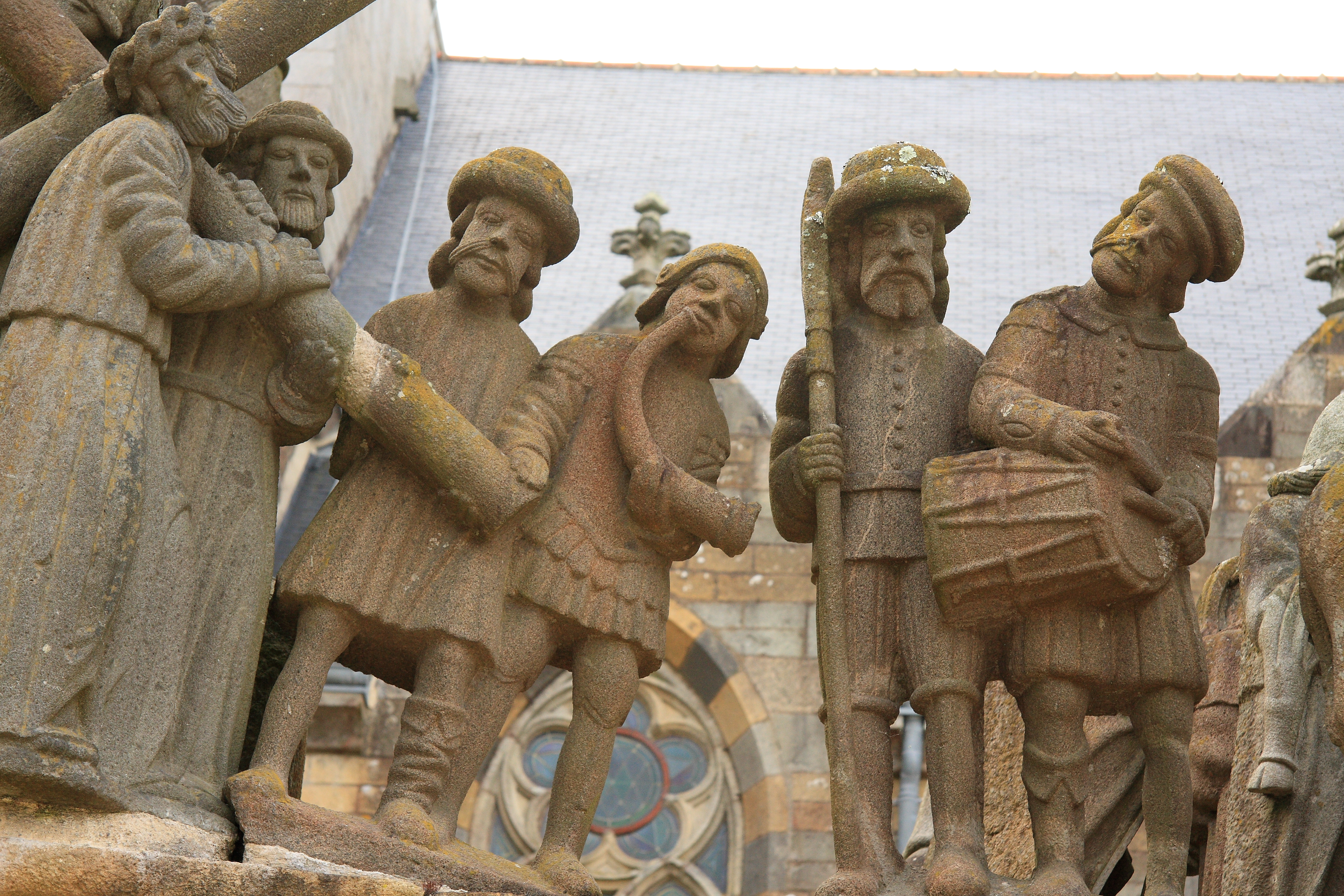
Christ is shown carrying the Cross.

== The south face of the calvary ==
On the south facing surface of the pedestal fourteen statues cover aspects of Jesus' journey carrying the cross to Calvary, the "Chemin de Croix" (Stations of the Cross). These are, from left to right, St Veronica holding up her veil which now bears Jesus' image, Saint John and the Virgin Mary following Jesus carrying the cross, Christ surrounded by soldiers two of whom are blowing horns, Jesus is helped by Simon of Cyrene, a man beating on a Tabor (instrument) and finally heading the cortège is a man on horseback. Along the cornice beneath these figures, and from left to right, the scenes deal with the Last Supper and Saint Peter washing Christ's feet watched by the other disciples. One soldier rests his leg on the cross pushing it down and adding to the weight which Jesus has to carry

- Jesus carrying the cross. Looking closely at the six soldiers, the one near the bottom of the cross where it is dragging on the ground holds a shield and sword. Then the man with his leg straddling the cross and seeming to add to Christ' difficulty in lifting the cross, has a piece of rope in his right hand and in his left hand what appears to be a form of maraca to add to the rhythm of the music being played. The sixth soldier also appears to be pushing the cross down to add to the weight.
- The Last Supper. Jesus sits at the table with the apostles. Judas Iscariot sits at one end of the table holding a purse. One of the apostles holds a cup and another a knife. In the case of three of the apostles, the sculptor uses the device to show they are speaking by showing them placing the index finger of their right hand on the thumb of their left hand.
- The Washing of Feet. Jesus washes Saint Peter's feet whilst the other apostles look on and await their turn, their demeanor expressing a mixture of admiration and astonishment. Judas has now left the gathering.
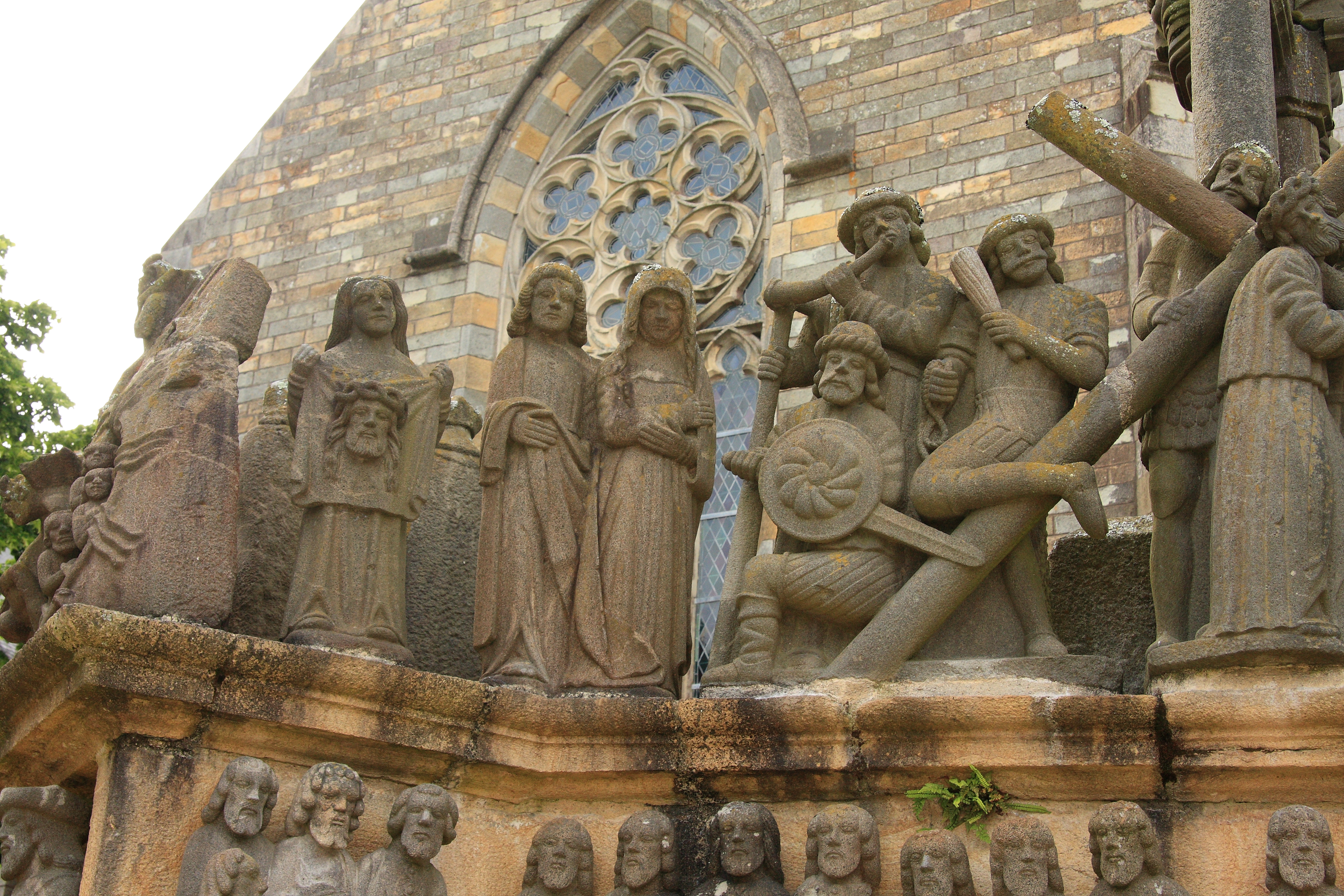
Veronica holds up her veil bearing Jesus' image, Saint John and the Virgin Mary follow Jesus carrying the Cross, assisted by Simon and between them and Jesus three soldiers play instruments.

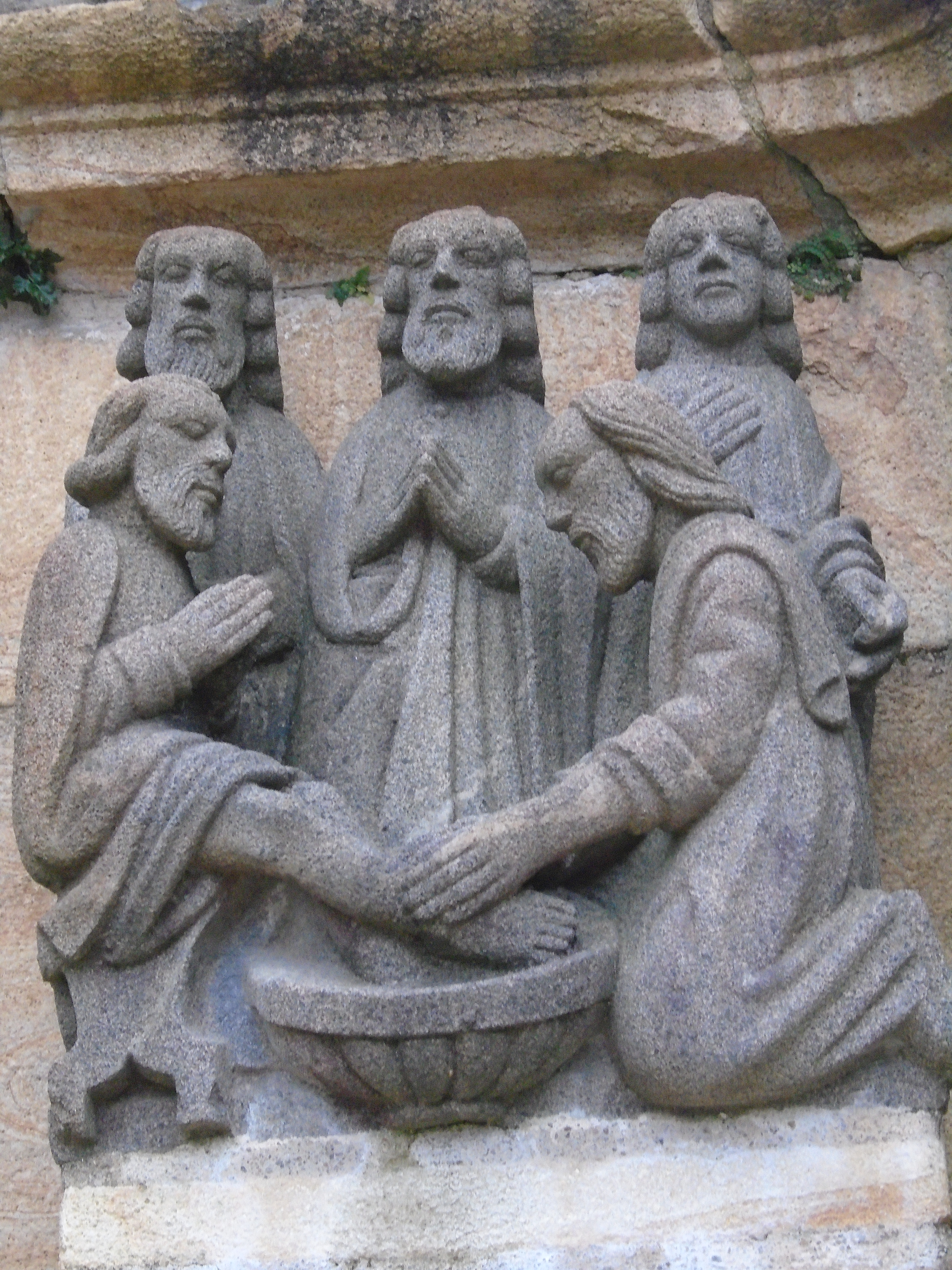
Jesus washing Peter's feet

== The east face of the calvary ==
This face of the Calvary deals with aspects of the birth and the death of Jesus. On the eastern cornice and after the buttress with the niche containing the depiction of Saint Matthew, we start with the Virgin of the Annunciation kneeling in prayer. Normally the Archangel Gabriel would appear in front of her but in this case, the sculptor places five further scenes before Gabriel appears. The Annunciation is thus interspersed with the visitation, Mary's marriage to Joseph, the nativity with Jesus being crowned, the circumcision and the flight into Egypt of Mary, Joseph and Jesus and finally the Archangel Gabriel completing the Annunciation story. He holds a flowered sceptre, the symbol of a celestial mission. He also holds a banner reading " Ave gratia plena". We then have the buttress with Saint Mark depicted along with his lion.

- The Virgin of the Annunciation. Mary kneels at a prie-dieu her right hand resting on a book, her left hand resting on her chest. A vase of lilies is by her side.
- The Visitation. The Virgin Mary and her cousin Elizabeth face each other and hold hands in greeting. They discuss the miracles God has worked with them both.
- Mary's marriage to Joseph. A priest dressed in surplus, cappa magna and wearing a mitre takes the hands of Mary and Joseph whilst they take their vows. Joseph holds his staff in his left hand and it has miraculously sprouted flowers.
- The nativity. The baby Jesus lies between Mary and Joseph who are both kneeling. A small angel joins the two admiring parents whilst the cow and ass seem to be warming Jesus with their breath.
- The flight into Egypt. The Virgin Mary sits side-saddle on a donkey, her feet resting on a suspended board which has created a large stirrup. Jesus is on her knee wrapped in swaddling clothes. Joseph wears a hat and carries a baton.
- The Archangel Gabriel. When he finally appears he holds out a lily in his left hand and is raising the other hand.

Above this cornice and on the surface of the eastern face of the pedestal we start with a depiction of an angel and then Jesus being baptized. Then we see the "Mise au tombeau"; Jesus being prepared for burial, with Nicodemus, Joseph of Arimathea, Mary Cleophas and Gamaliel in attendance. A man stands holding a linen shroud. Mary is being supported by John and Mary Magdalene holds her pot of oil. Finally, we see Jesus being taken before Annas the father in law of Caiaphas. Annas does not want to get involved and sends the accused to appear before Caiaphas.

- The baptism. John the Baptist is dressed in an animal skin and pours water from the Jordan on Jesus' head and next to Jesus an angel stands holding the Holy Robe/Seamless robe of Jesus.
- The "Mise au tombeau". The body of Jesus is prepared before being placed in a sepulchre here carved to replicate the type of sepulchre that would have been used in antiquity. Mary accompanied by John the Evangelist, Mary Magdalene and another female figure are in deep despair and cannot take their eyes of the body. Nicodemus and Joseph of Arimathea stand at Jesus' head and feet and there is a third person present, probably Abibon or Gamaliel.
- The appearance before Caiaphas. Jesus is guarded by two soldiers. Caiaphas' servant has one hand on Jesus' shoulder and raises the other hand as if to hit him. A third soldier wears a turban and seems to be in charge of the other two. According to the Gospel of John (the event is not mentioned in other accounts) Jesus was first brought before Annas and after a brief questioning of him (John 18:19-23) was sent to the home of Caiaphas where some members of the Sanhedrin were gathered and the first trial of Jesus took place (Matt. 26:57-68).

== The north face of the Calvary ==
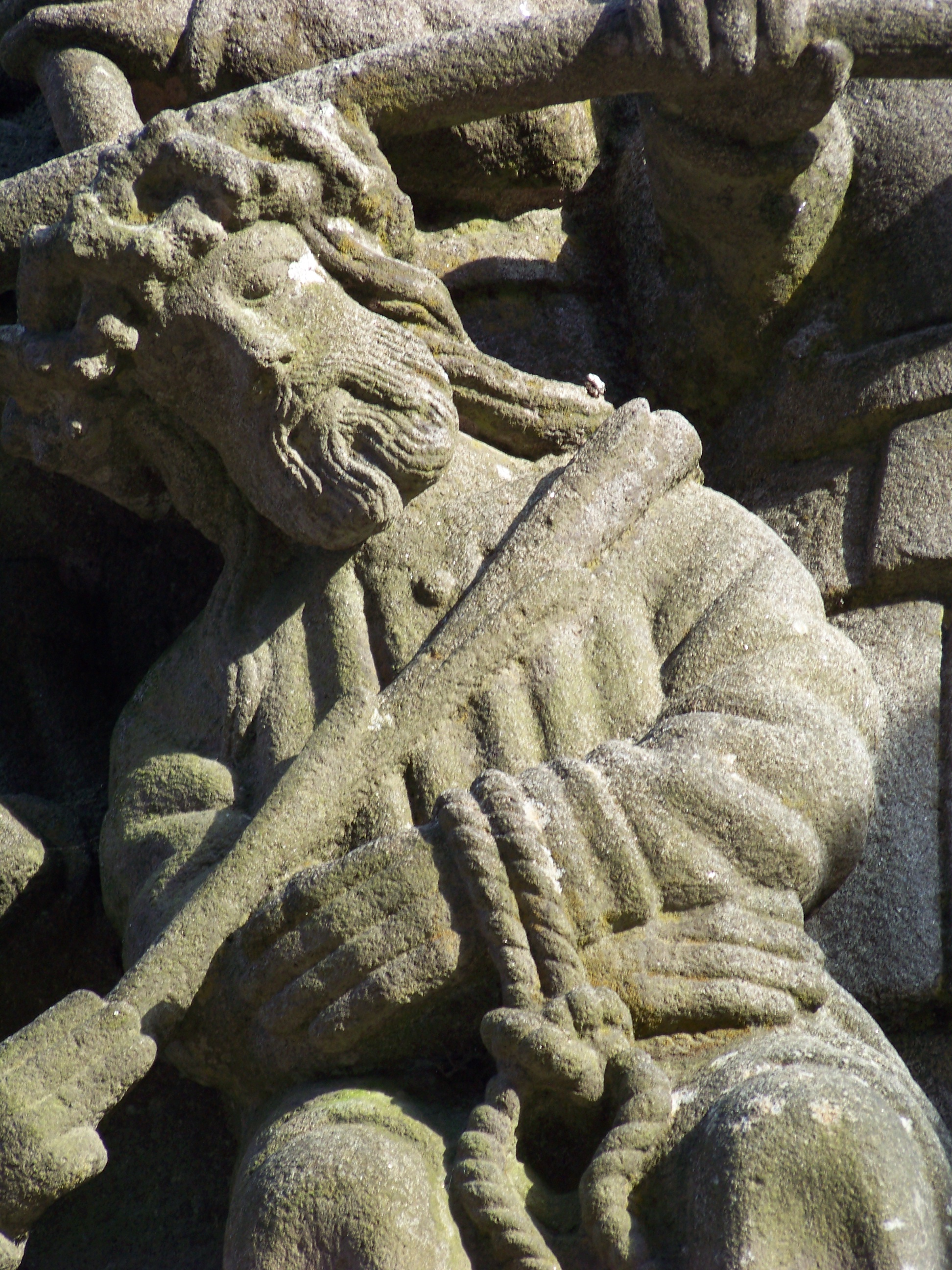
A soldier taps Jesus on the chest with a reed, the reed he will eventually hold in his right hand.

Here we deal with the north facing cornice and the statues ranged above it as well as the scene depicted above the north west buttress. This section of the Calvary deals with Christ's suffering-"La souffrance"

On the north facing cornice and from left to right are depictions of Jesus praying in Gethsemane with Saint John next to him, Saint Peter and James, son of Zebedee, a guard restraining Saint Peter who holds the sword with which he has just cut off the ear of Malchus, Jesus and Judas with Malchus on the ground before them. Next, come statues depicting the three soldiers who helped with the arrest of Jesus and a fourth who holds a rope this followed by Jesus' being brought before Caiaphas. Above the frieze we firstly see some soldiers carrying whips, then Jesus tied to a column with two more soldiers in attendance. The scene is set for his flagellation. Next the crown of thorns is pressed on to Christ's head whilst at his feet, a soldier taps him with a reed. Jesus is now presented to Pontius Pilate and a Jew who stands to Jesus' right and makes his accusations.

- In the garden of Gethsemane, Jesus is depicted on his knees in prayer. Saint John is at his side and in a deep sleep, his head cupped in his left hand. Saint Peter and Saint James are also fast asleep.
- Jesus' arrest. Eight statues tell the story of Jesus' arrest. First, we have a helmeted guard in armour who holds a rope in his hand and to his left is Saint Peter brandishing the sword with which he has cut off Malchus' ear. Then we see Jesus and Judas and at their feet Malchus who has fallen backward to the ground after being struck by Saint Peter and has dropped the lantern he was carrying. He tries to steady himself by holding on Jesus' arm. Judas stands close to Jesus holding the purse no doubt containing the reward for his treachery. He has either kissed Jesus or is about to do so. Then we have three other guards who will make the arrest. The one in the middle holds a sword. Jesus is then led before Caiaphas who is seated and holds a sceptre and wears a crown, symbols of his power.
- The Flagellation scene. In the flagellation scene, we start with two soldiers standing holding whips then see two soldiers who have tied Jesus to a column.
- The crown of thorns. Three soldiers put much effort into pushing the crown down on Jesus' head using a long bar which is lain across the crown and then pushed down. A fourth soldier kneels by Jesus' side and taps his chest with a reed.
- The appearance before Pontius Pilate. Jesus' hands are tied and he still wears the crown of thorns and in his right hand holds the reed. Pilate wears a turban and his hands are spread open as he addresses those who have brought Jesus before him. One soldier opens Jesus' cloak. On his right, another soldier prepares the towel he will give Pilate to wash his hands. The last of the soldiers carries a jug of water.

On the space over the north east buttress, we see Jesus being mocked and ridiculed by five guards ("Christ aux outrages"). He sits on a stool. His hands are bound and he is blindfolded. A soldier standing on the left holds a whip ready to start the flogging. Three soldiers stand behind Jesus and two have their hands raised ready as though to strike him. Another soldier kneels at Jesus' side taunting him and asking who has hit him.

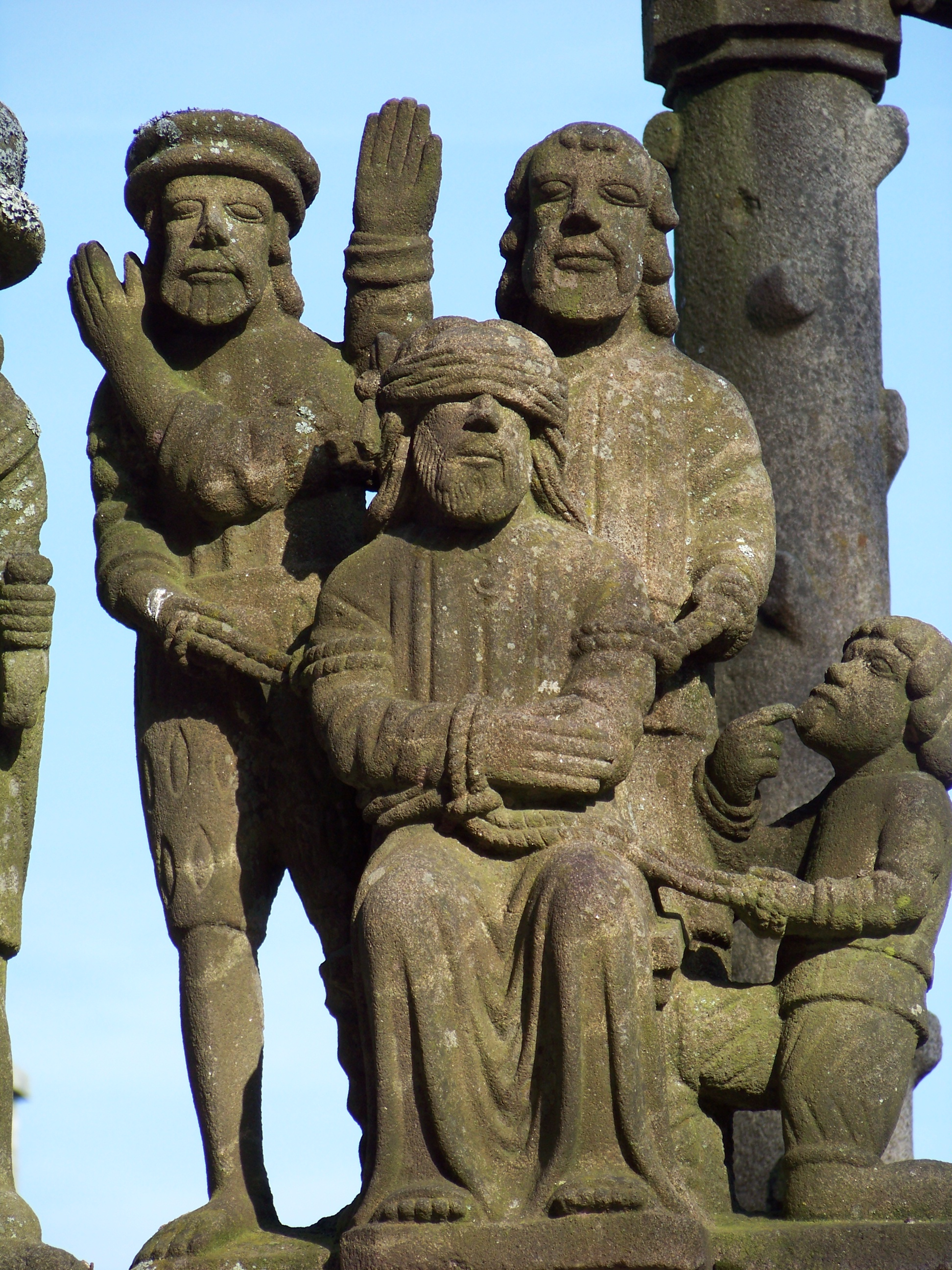
Jesus sits on a stool awaiting his flogging. He is bound and blindfolded. The soldiers mock him and one kneels in front of Jesus and makes fun of him. Two have raised hands with which they will hit Jesus who is blindfolded so is teased by the soldier on his kness who asks "who hit you?"

== The three crosses ==
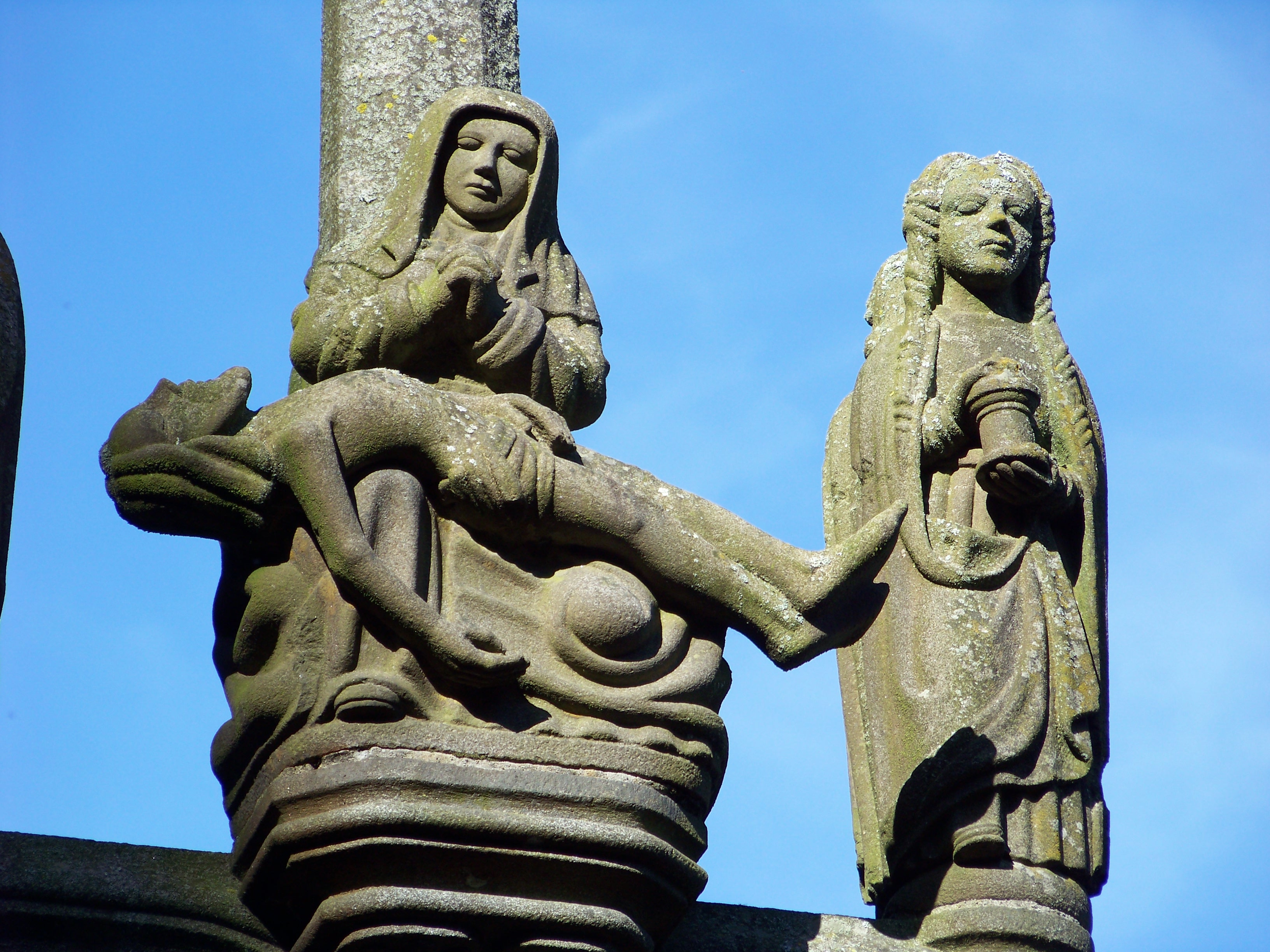
The Pieta. The Virgin Mary holds the body of her dead son whilst Mary Magdalene stands with her pot of ointment

The shaft of the central cross is covered in small lumps as was the case with all votive crosses erected to celebrate the end of an outbreak of the plague. These are thought by some architectural historians to mimick the boil like sores which were one of the symptoms of the bubonic plague. Dismas, the good thief, hangs from a cross to the right of Jesus and an angel stands near his right shoulder ready to carry off his soul. The bad thief hangs on the cross to Jesus' left and in his case it is the devil who will carry off his soul. Both the angel and the devil clutch small doll like sculptures no doubt depictions of the souls they will eventually carry off.

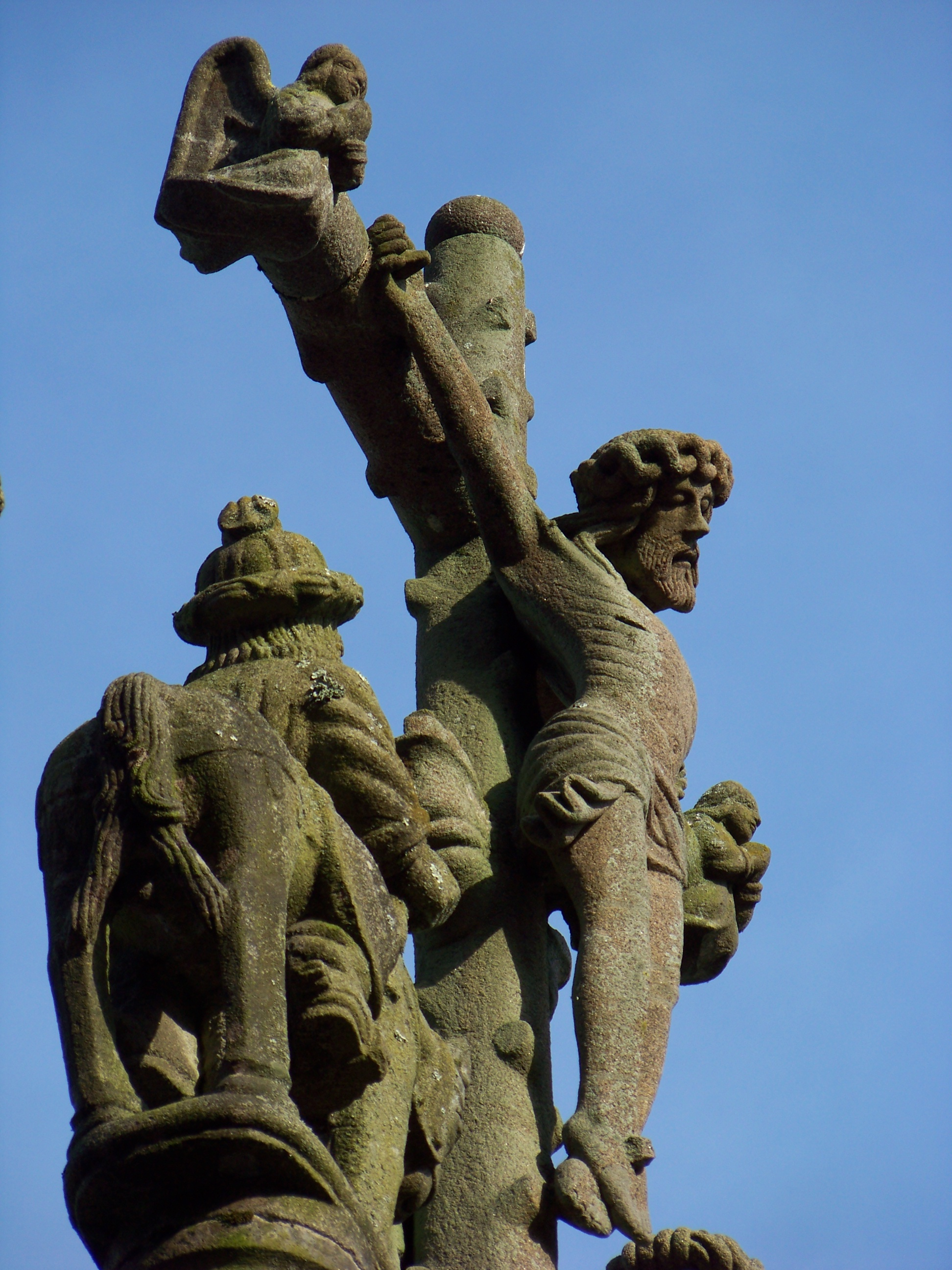
Jesus on the cross and one of the two horsemen on the upper crosspiece

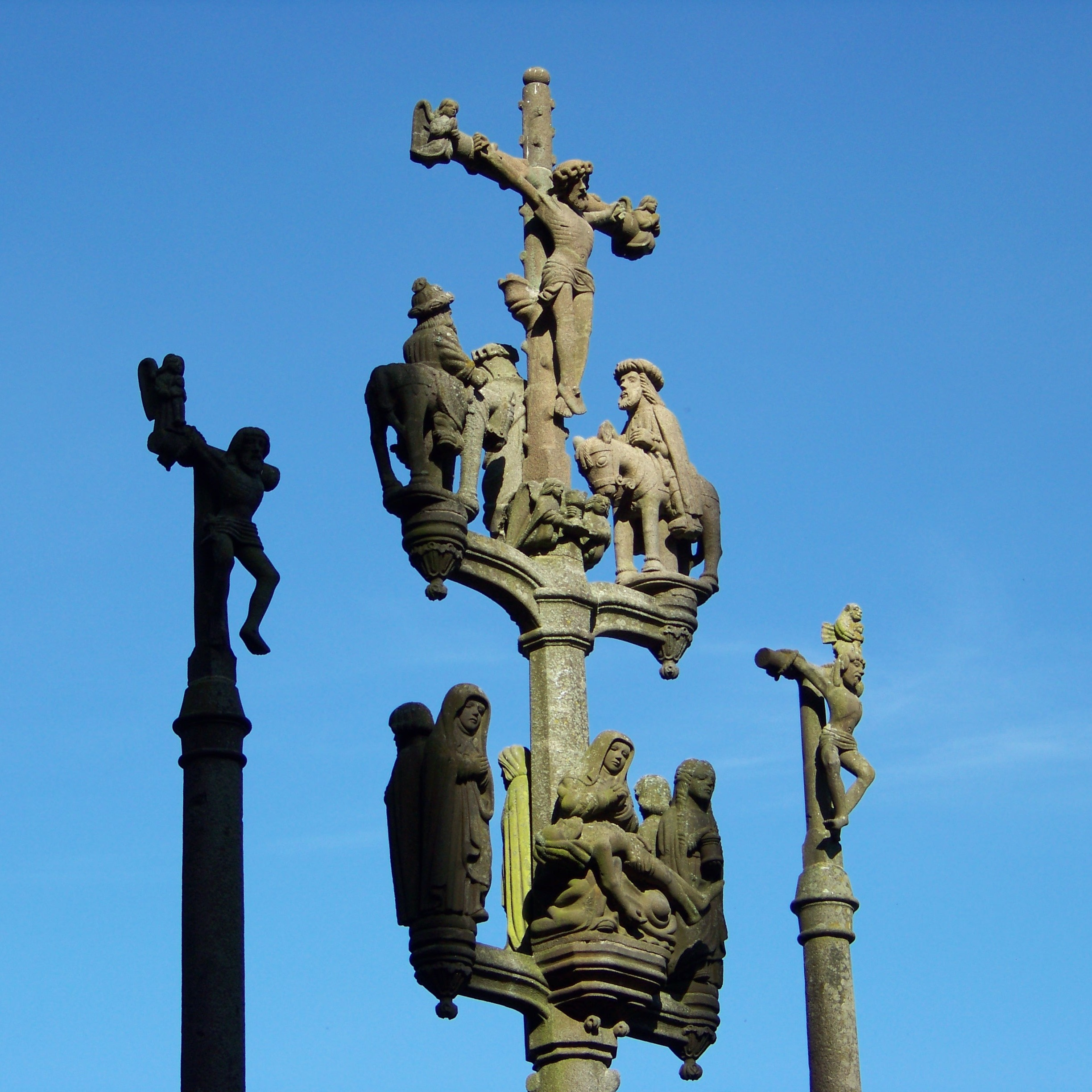
A view of the three crosses

On the lower crosspiece of the central cross are back to back statues (géminée) depicting Mary Cléophas, a piéta and Mary Magdalene on one side with Saint John, a statue of the risen Christ and Saint Peter on the other. On the upper crosspiece are two men on horseback, Saint Longinus and Stephaton, the two soldiers who were at the crucifixion. It was Longinus who pierced Jesus' side so he carries a lance whilst Stephaton carries a sponge as he was the soldier who gave Jesus a sponge soaked in vinegar. On the reverse side of the two horsemen is a depiction of Jesus tied with ropes ("Christ lié"). Jesus hangs from the central cross and is sculpted back to back with an Ecce Homo. The crucified Jesus is surrounded by four small angels who are collecting the blood running from his wounds. Note that Jesus was nailed to the cross but the two thieves were tied to their crosses with rope.

- The "Ecco Homo". Jesus, carrying the crown of thorns and the reed, is presented to the crowd.
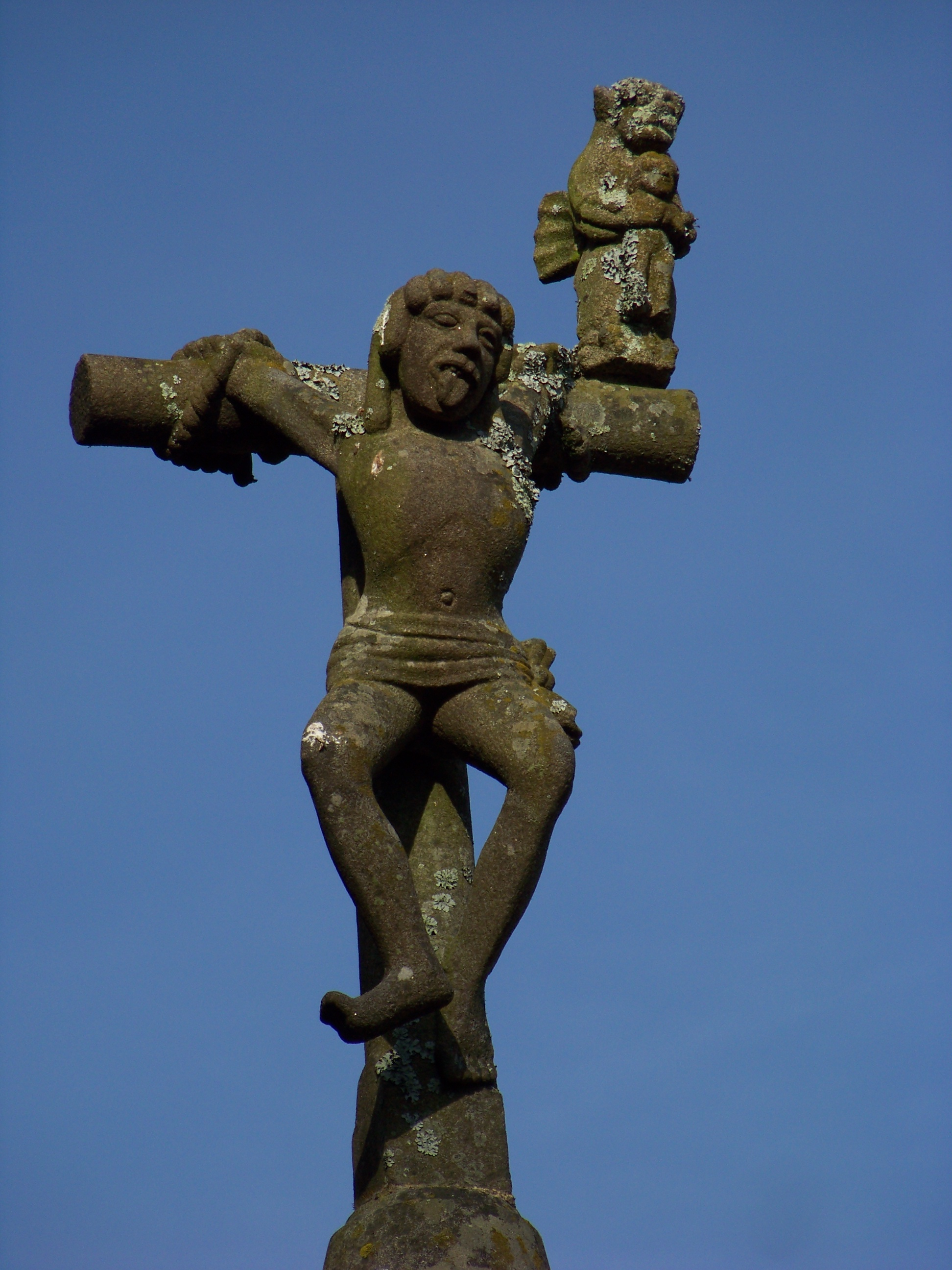
The "bad" thief, the devil at his shoulder waiting to whisk off his soul

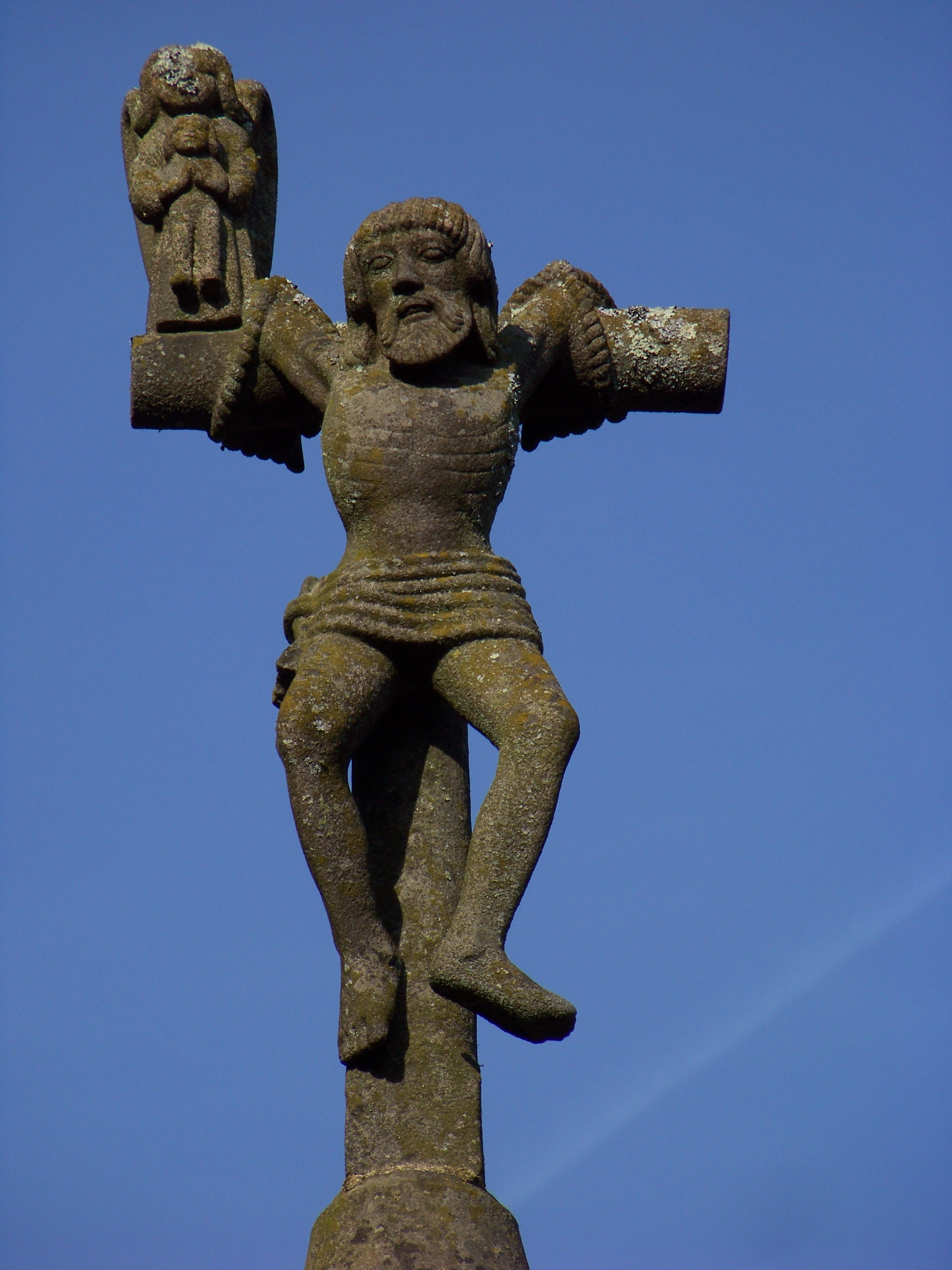
The "good" thief, an angel at his shoulder waits to carry off his soul

== Notes ==
1. All the people portrayed wear the dress worn at the time the Calvary was built rather than the dress appropriate to the time of Christ's life. This was a common trait with 17th-century Breton sculptors.
2. In 1904 Honorary Canon J.M. Abgrall wrote a paper entitled "Le Calvaire de Plougastel-Daoulas." This gives a full description of the Calvary and, being written at the beginning of the 20th century, it covers the work before the 1944 bombing and shows the changes made to the actual order of the statues. This paper can be read on line at http://gallica.bnf.fr/ark:/12148/bpt6k207669n/f239-Page 182 to 190.

== Gallery ==
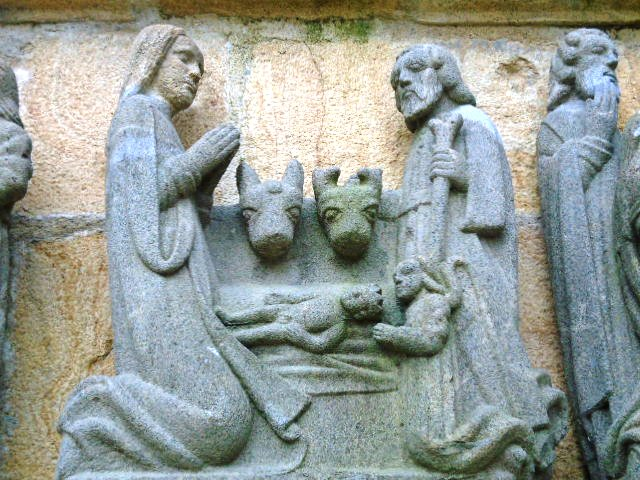
The newly born Jesus in the manger

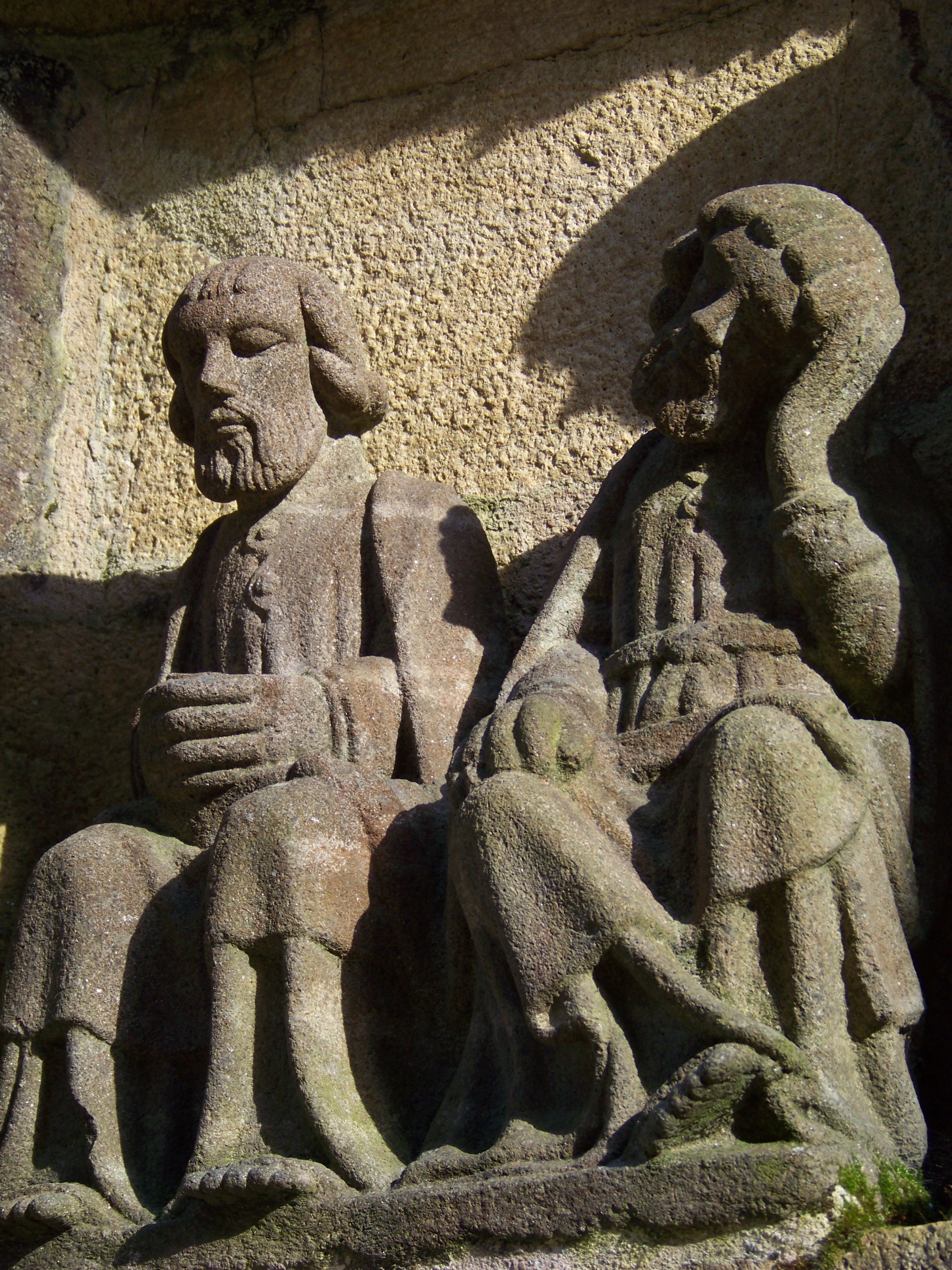
Two of the disciples fast asleep in the garden of Gethsemane

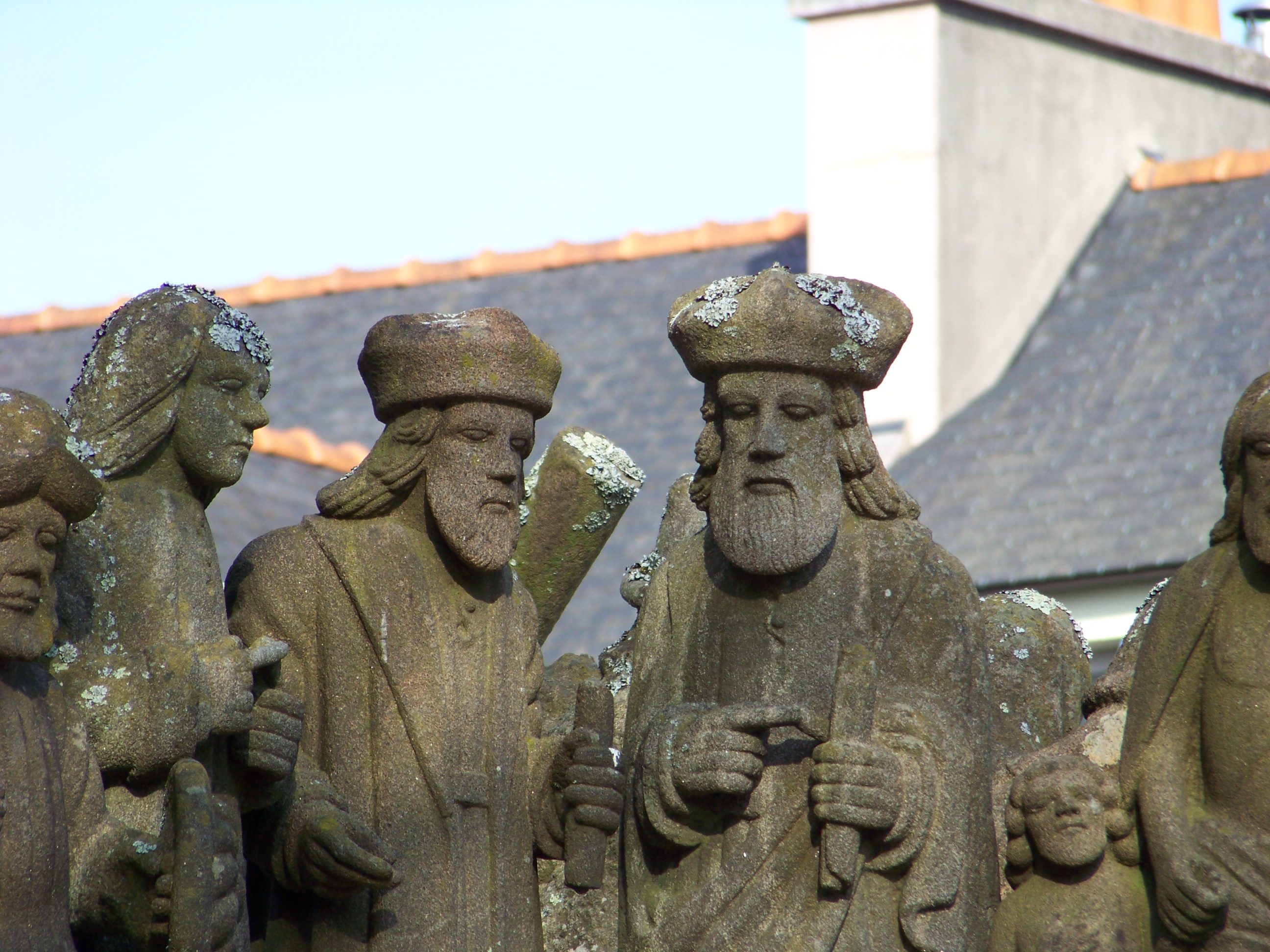
Jesus holds discussions with two lawyers

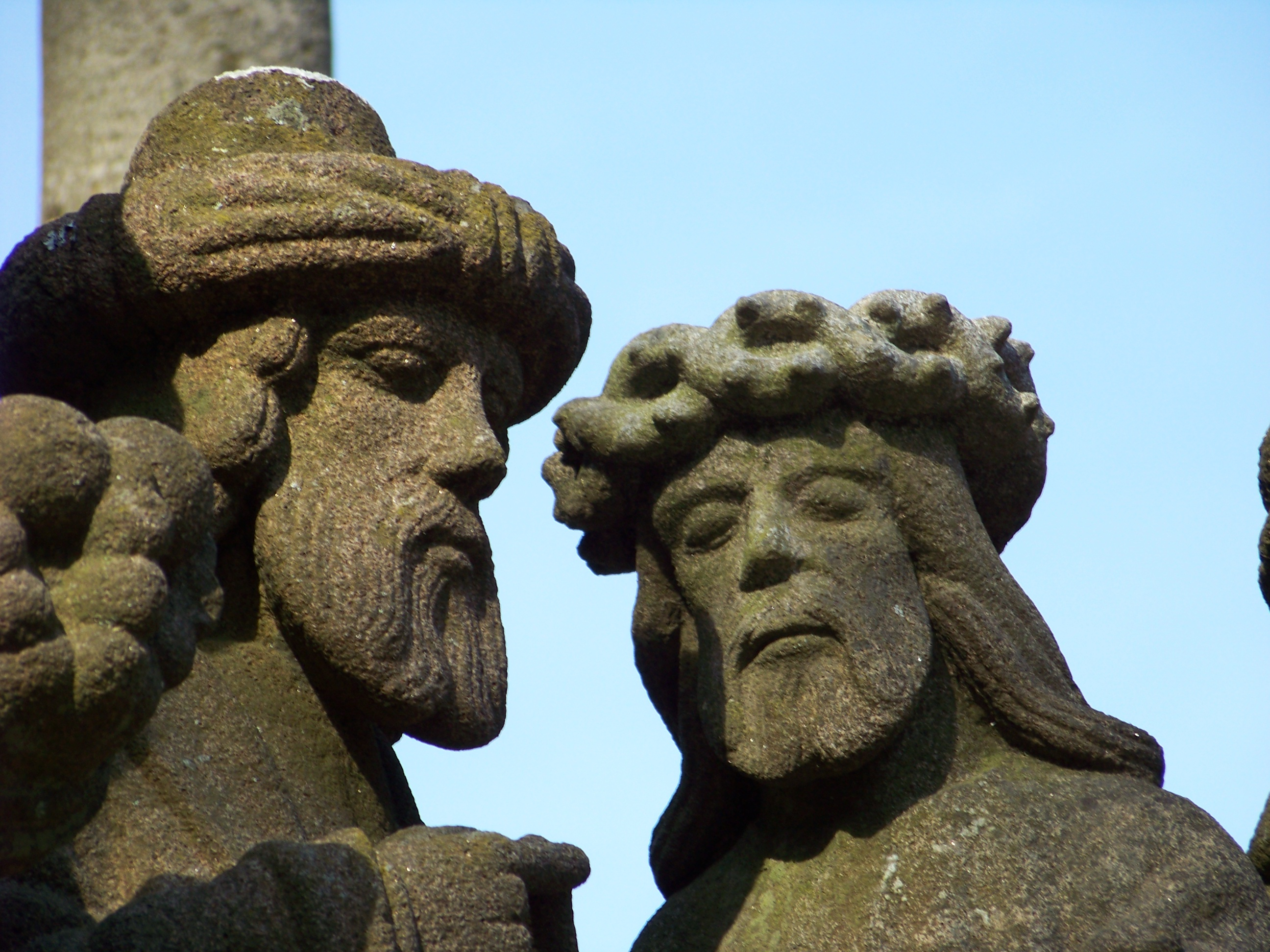
Jesus appears before Pontius Pilate

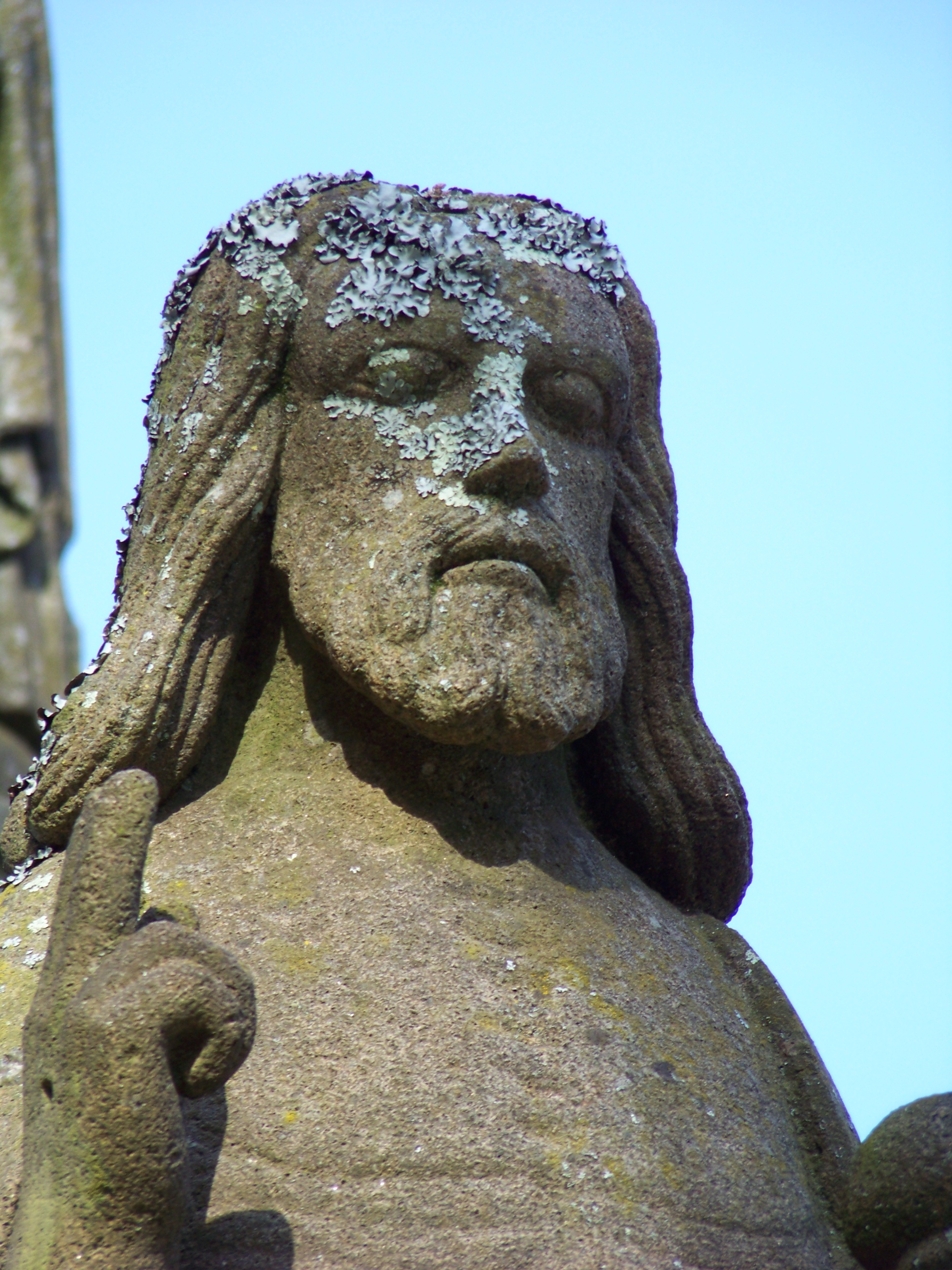
The "Risen Lord" has emerged from the tomb and gives a blessing

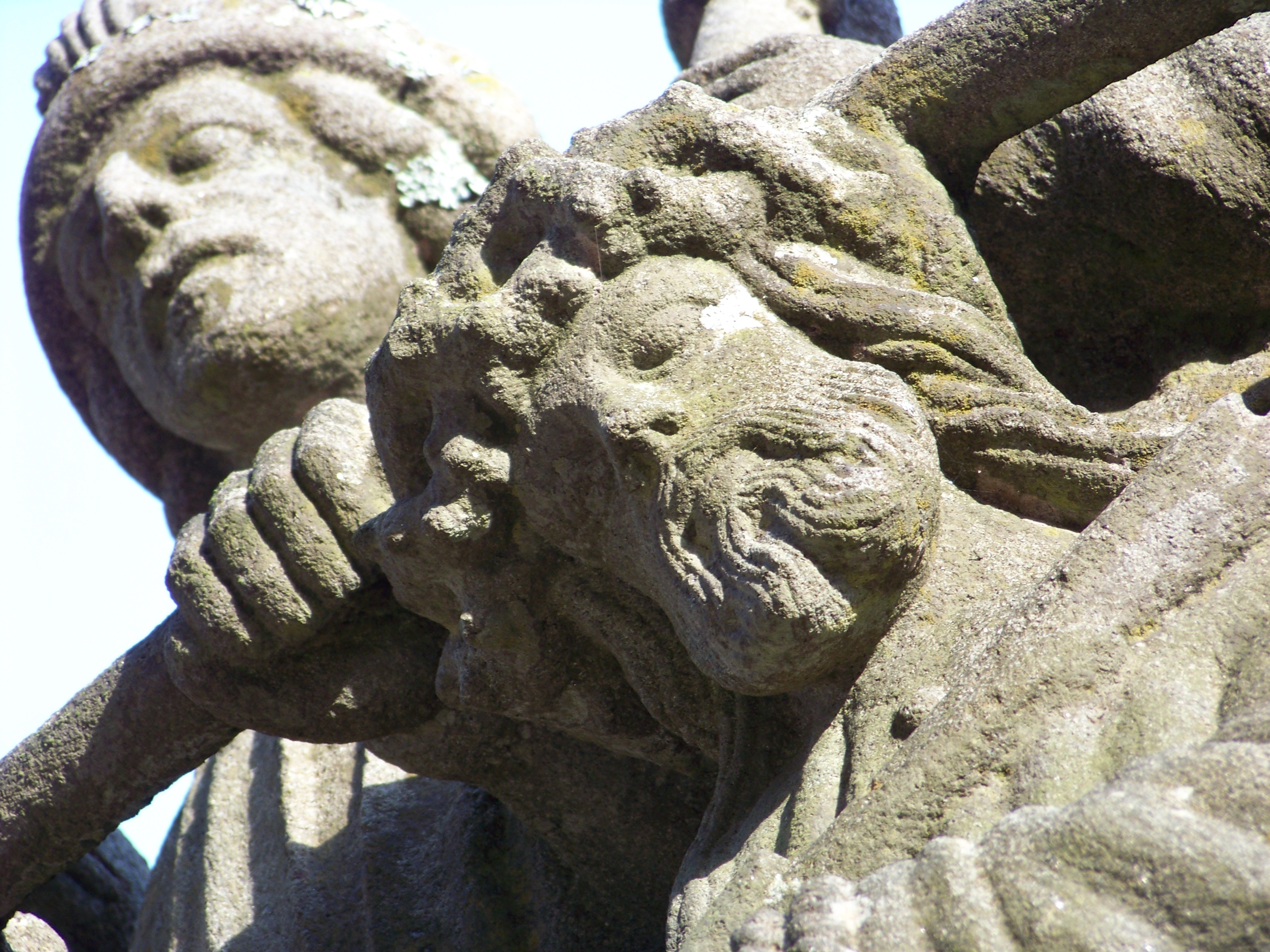
A rod is pressed down on the crown of thorns so that it pierces Jesus' flesh

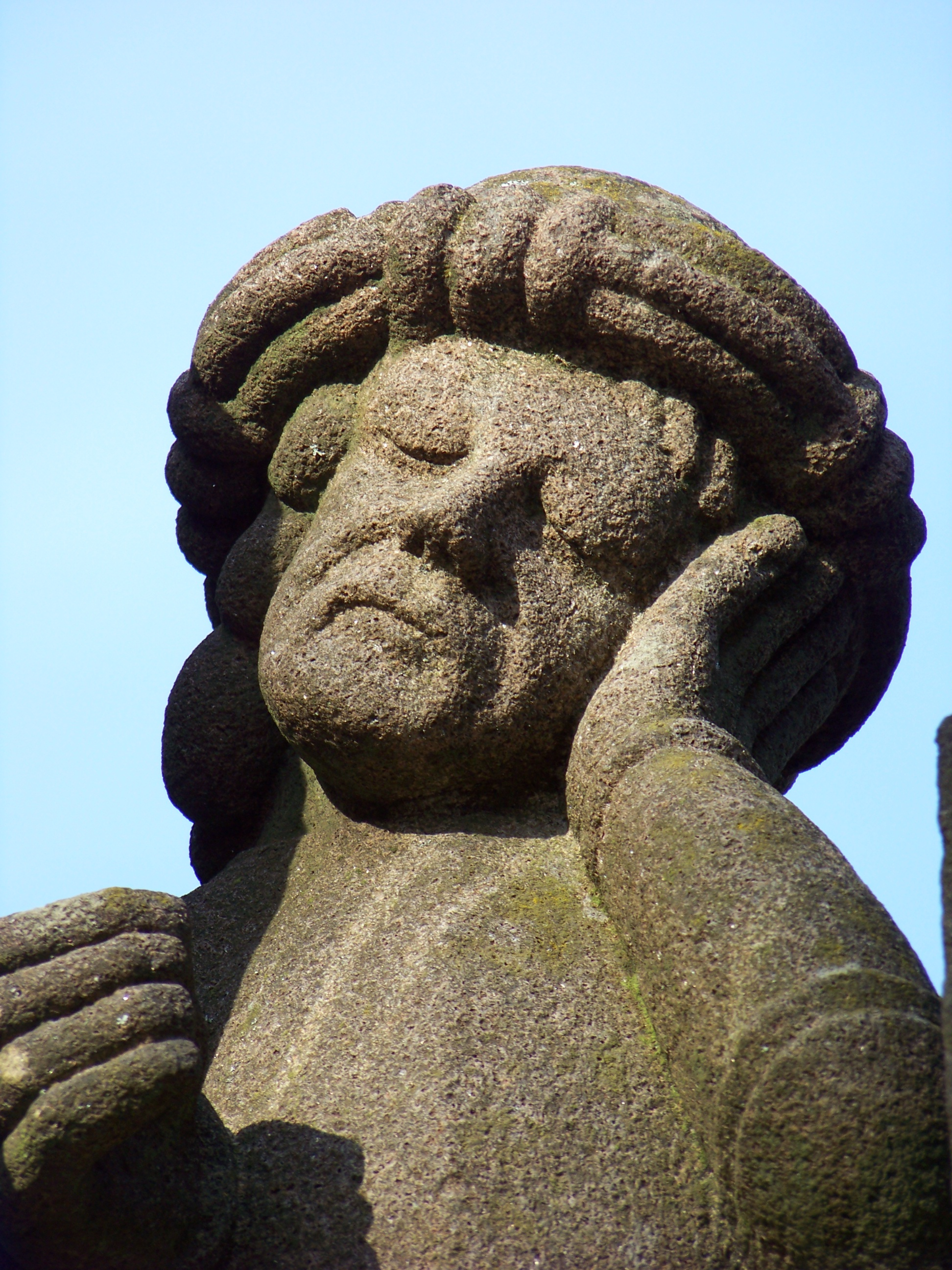
One of the guards stands at the side of the "Risen Lord" his eyes closed as though sleeping

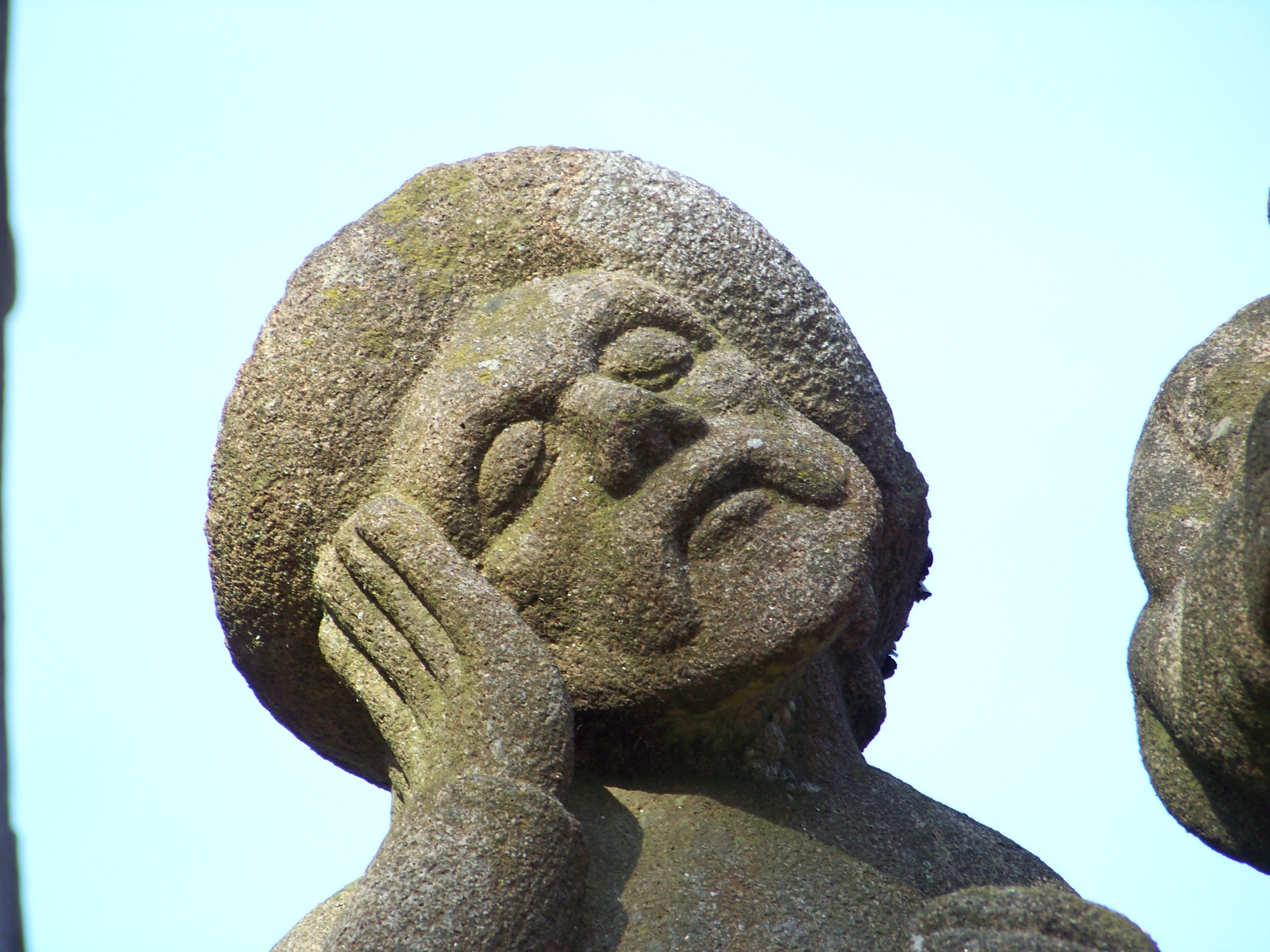
As does the second standing guard

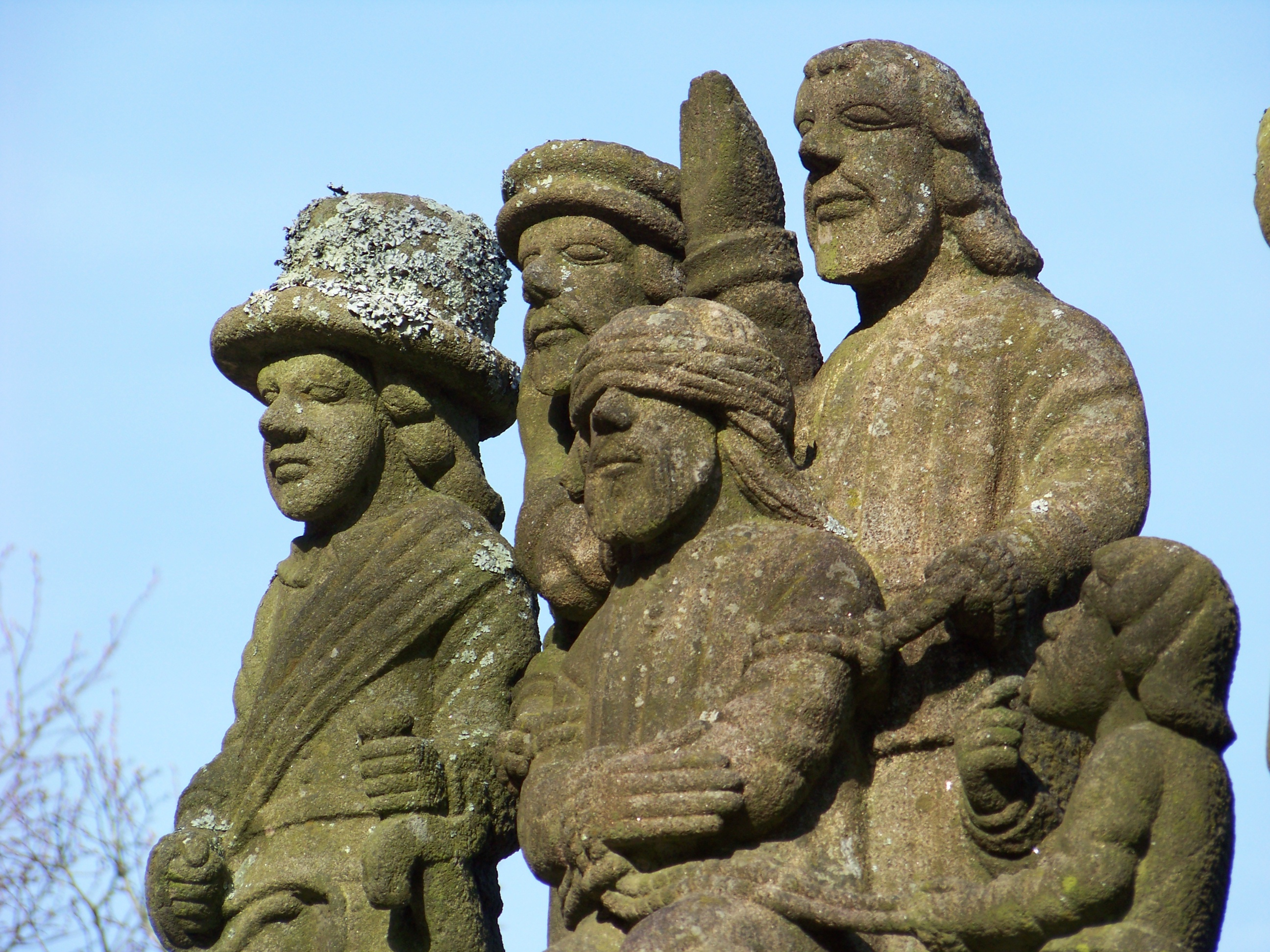
Jesus is mocked and humiliated. The figure kneeling to Jesus' left taunts him asking "Who hit you?"

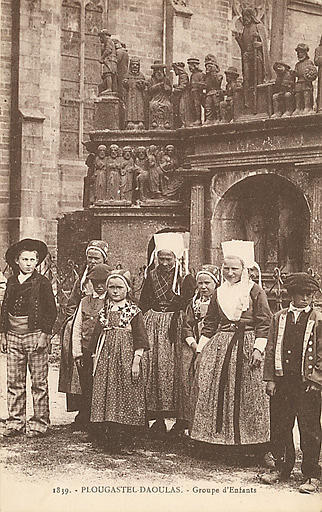
1859 photograph of Bretons standing before the Calvary

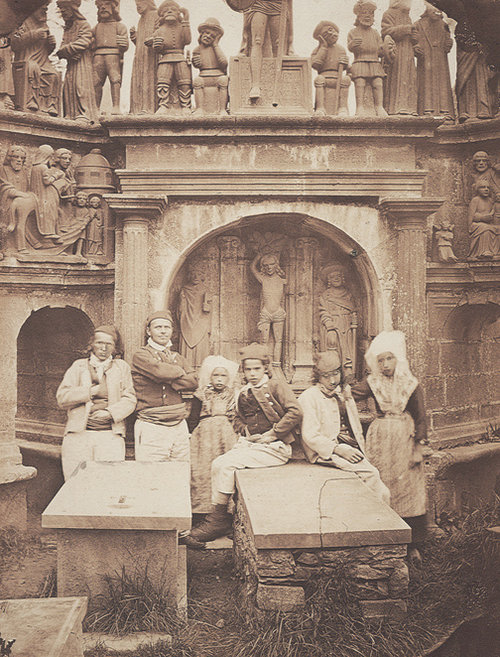
An 1856 photograph showing Bretons in front of the arched recess which contains statues of saint Peter, saint Sebastian and saint Roch

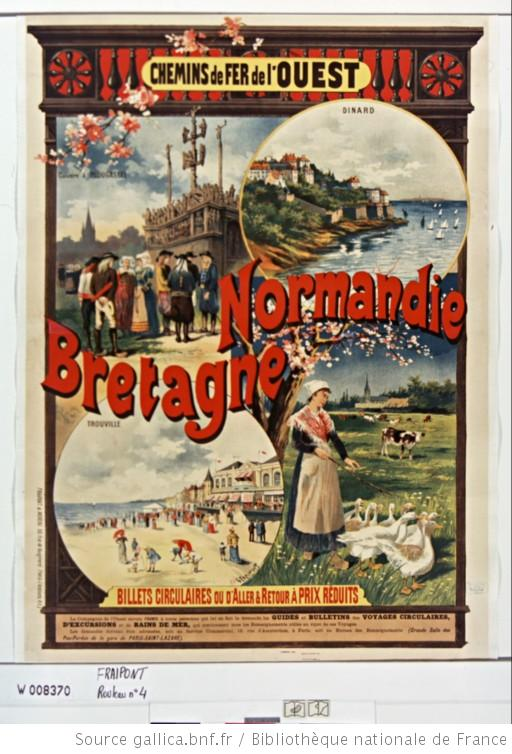
Old railway poster includes image Plougastel-Daoulas calvary
