= Saint-Thonan =

Saint-Thonan Sant-Tonan
- Commune
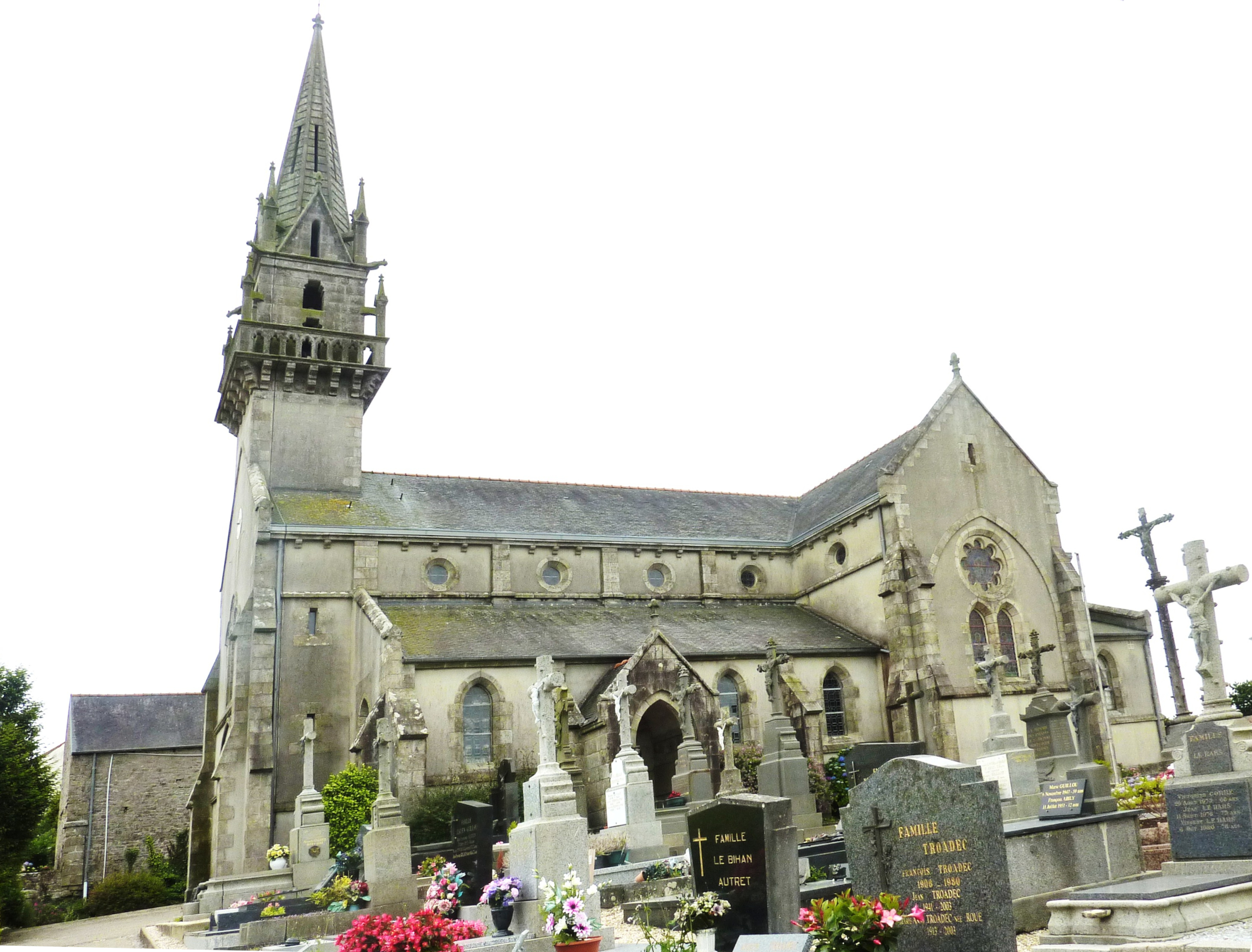
- The parish church in Saint-Thonan
- Location of Saint-Thonan
- Location within France Location within Brittany
- Coordinates: 48°28′47″N 4°20′04″W
- Country: France
- Region: Brittany
- Department: Finistère
- Arrondissement: Brest
- Canton: Landerneau
- Intercommunality: CA Pays de Landerneau-Daoulas

Government
  - Mayor (2020–2026): Marc Jézéquel
- Area^{1}: 11.29 km^{2} (4.36 sq mi)
- Highest elevation: 116 m (381 ft)
- Lowest elevation: 34 m (112 ft)
- Population (2023): 1,956
  - Density: 173.3/km^{2} (448.7/sq mi)
- Time zone: UTC+01:00 (CET)
  - Summer (DST): UTC+02:00 (CEST)
- INSEE/Postal code: 29268 /29800
- ^{1} French Land Register data, which excludes lakes, ponds, glaciers > 1 km^{2} (0.386 sq mi or 247 acres) and river estuaries.

Saint-Thonan (French pronunciation: [sɛ̃ tɔnɑ̃]; Breton: Sant-Tonan) is a commune in the Finistère department of Brittany in north-western France.

== Population ==
Historical population
Year	Pop.	±% p.a.
1968	556	—
1975	583	+0.68%
1982	769	+4.04%
1990	1,083	+4.37%
1999	1,165	+0.81%
2007	1,322	+1.59%
2012	1,485	+2.35%
2017	1,821	+4.16%
2023	1,956	+1.20%
Source: INSEE

Inhabitants of Saint-Thonan are called in French Saint-Thonanais.

== See also ==
- Communes of the Finistère department
