= Canton of Landerneau =

Coordinates: 48.45°N 4.25°W

The canton of Landerneau is an administrative division of the Finistère department, northwestern France. Its borders were modified at the French canton reorganisation which came into effect in March 2015. Its seat is in Landerneau.

It consists of the following communes:

1. La Forest-Landerneau
2. Landerneau
3. Lanneuffret
4. Pencran
5. Plouédern
6. La Roche-Maurice
7. Saint-Divy
8. Saint-Thonan
9. Trémaouézan
