= Lanneuffret =

Lanneuffret Lanneured
- Commune
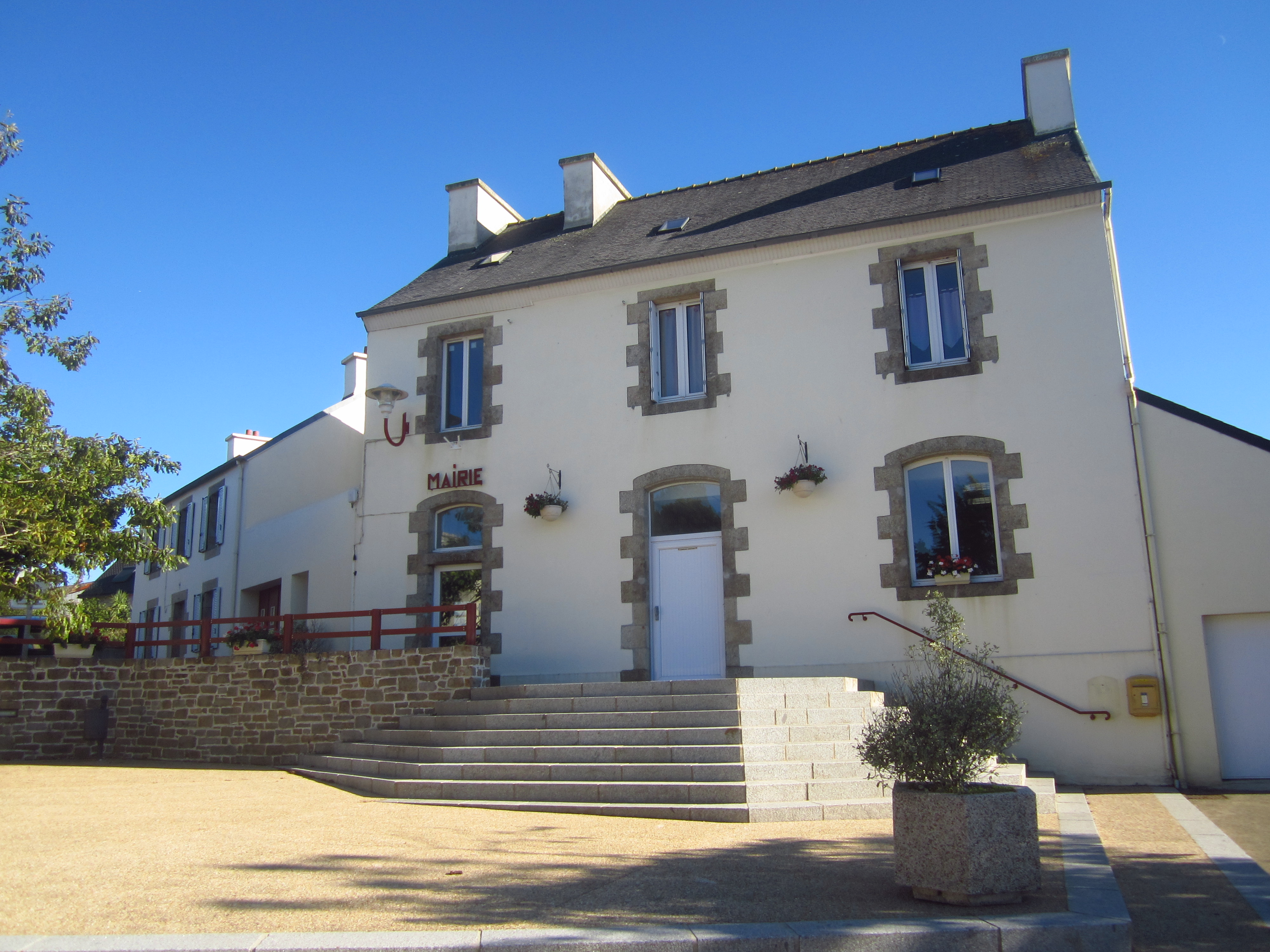
- The town hall in Lanneuffret

- Coat of arms
- Location of Lanneuffret
- Location within France Location within Brittany
- Coordinates: 48°29′54″N 4°12′05″W
- Country: France
- Region: Brittany
- Department: Finistère
- Arrondissement: Brest
- Canton: Landerneau
- Intercommunality: CA Pays de Landerneau-Daoulas

Government
  - Mayor (2020–2026): André Sergent
- Area^{1}: 2.24 km^{2} (0.86 sq mi)
- Highest elevation: 106 m (348 ft)
- Lowest elevation: 46 m (151 ft)
- Population (2023): 158
  - Density: 70.5/km^{2} (183/sq mi)
- Time zone: UTC+01:00 (CET)
  - Summer (DST): UTC+02:00 (CEST)
- INSEE/Postal code: 29116 /29400
- ^{1} French Land Register data, which excludes lakes, ponds, glaciers > 1 km^{2} (0.386 sq mi or 247 acres) and river estuaries.

Lanneuffret (French pronunciation: [lanœfʁɛt]; Breton: Lanneured) is a commune in the Finistère department of Brittany in north-western France.

== Population ==
Inhabitants of Lanneuffret are called in French Lanneuffretois.

== See also ==
- Communes of the Finistère department
- Lanneuffret Parish close
- List of the works of the Maître de Plougastel
