= Plouédern =

Plouédern Plouedern
- Commune
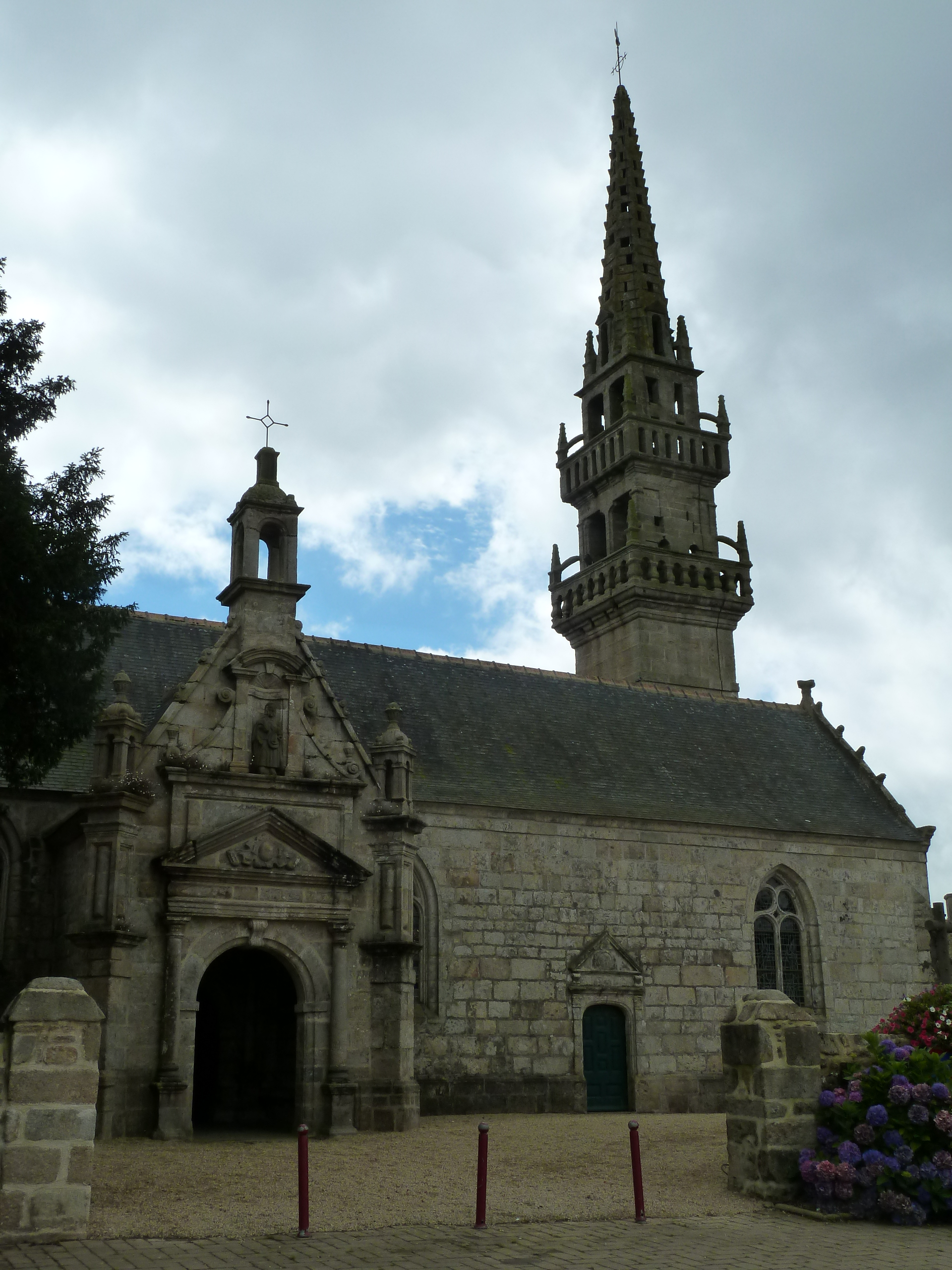
- The church in Plouédern
- Location of Plouédern
- Location within France Location within Brittany
- Coordinates: 48°29′09″N 4°14′39″W
- Country: France
- Region: Brittany
- Department: Finistère
- Arrondissement: Brest
- Canton: Landerneau
- Intercommunality: CA Pays de Landerneau-Daoulas

Government
  - Mayor (2020–2026): Bernard Goalec
- Area^{1}: 19.62 km^{2} (7.58 sq mi)
- Highest elevation: 116 m (381 ft)
- Lowest elevation: 1 m (3.3 ft)
- Population (2023): 3,103
  - Density: 158.2/km^{2} (409.6/sq mi)
- Time zone: UTC+01:00 (CET)
  - Summer (DST): UTC+02:00 (CEST)
- INSEE/Postal code: 29181 /29800
- ^{1} French Land Register data, which excludes lakes, ponds, glaciers > 1 km^{2} (0.386 sq mi or 247 acres) and river estuaries.

Plouédern (French pronunciation: [pluedɛʁn]; Breton: Plouedern) is a commune in the Finistère department of Brittany in north-western France.

== Population ==
Inhabitants of Plouédern are called in French Plouédernéens.

Historical population
Year	Pop.	±% p.a.
1968	1,814	—
1975	2,252	+3.14%
1982	2,586	+2.00%
1990	2,537	−0.24%
1999	2,558	+0.09%
2007	2,692	+0.64%
2012	2,792	+0.73%
2017	2,813	+0.15%
2023	3,103	+1.65%
Source: INSEE

== See also ==
- Communes of the Finistère department
