= Pencran Parish close =

Coordinates: 48.4371°N 4.2353°W

The Pencran Parish close (Enclos paroissial) is located at Pencran in the arrondissement of Brest in Brittany in north-western France. The Notre-Dame church, the sacristy, the two calvaries, the ossuary and the surrounding wall are a listed historical monument since 1990. Records show that there has been a religious building in Pencran since the 14th century, and in 1353 there was mention of a chapel dedicated to the Virgin Mary. Until the French Revolution the parish of Ploudiry covered an area from Loc-Eguiner to Pencran, but it was in 1801 that Pencran became an independent parish.

== The porch at Pencran ==
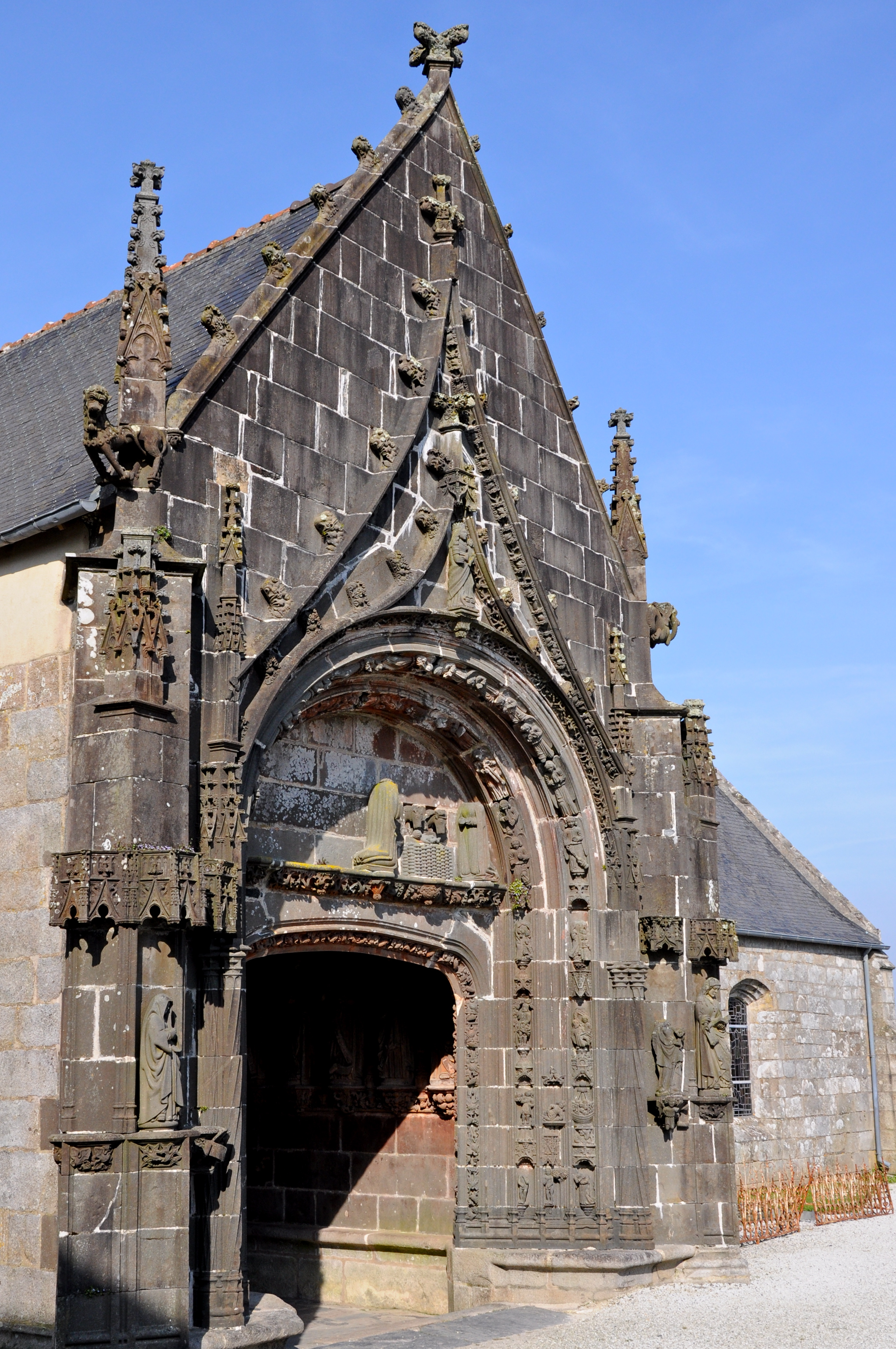
View of the south porch. In the tympanum we see the Nativity scene and we can see Adam and Eve's expulsion from the Garden of Eden in the first piédroit on the entrance's right.

This dates to 1553 and is decorated with an angel who holds a banner inscribed

LE 15 JOVR DE MARS L'AN 1553 FVT FONDE CESTE CHAPELLE AU NO(M)DE DIEV ET DE MADAME SAI(N)CTE APPOLINE DE PAR HERVE K(ER)JAHES ET GVILL(AVME)E BRAS FABRIQVES DE LAD.CHAPEL

According to local records Hervé Kerahès and Guillaume Bras were local builders. The porch comprises an entrance arch decorated with vine leaves and bunches of grapes as well as carvings of small animals and people eating grapes and playing a trumpet. In the external voussure of the entrance arch, the carvings start on the bottom left with a lion and, after the floral decoration, ends on the right with a dragon. In the centre there is a human head, wearing a hat and nibbling at grape seeds. In the interior voussure, the sculptors repeat the same pattern but a pig replaces the dragon. A large tympanum is located over the arch, with a nativity scene depicting the Virgin Mary and Joseph on either side of the baby Jesus who lies on a bed of straw whilst above him the heads of a cow and a donkey protrude from the wall. This group is situated to the right hand side of the tympanum suggesting that there had been another sculpture on the left side perhaps depicting another part of the nativity scene. (The piédroit is the stone at the bottom part of an arch up until the point when the arch starts to curve; the stones in the curved part of the arch are called voussures and it was common practice at the time to carve both stones.) The double band of piédroits and voussures in the Pencran porch arch portray scenes from the Book of Genesis. In the first nine stones and alternating between left and right we see a depiction of the temptation of Adam and Eve with a tree around which is a coiled snake who offers Eve the forbidden fruit. Move to the right hand side and we see an angel brandishing a sword and throwing the couple out of Paradise which is symbolised by a tree laden with leaves. In other scenes we see Cain and Abel lighting sacrificial fires. Cain fails to get his fire burning and the smoke blows back into his eyes which he shields with his right hand. Abel is more successful with his fire. We also see Cain murdering his brother. In other piédroits, there is a depiction of Noah's ark carrying Noah and his family and animals and of Noah picking grapes. He lifts his tunic to create a fold so that he can carry as many grapes as possible. A smaller carving shows Noah intoxicated having overdone the sampling of his wine! The outside of the porch is decorated in the Flamboyant Gothic style, the buttresses topped with pinnacles. After the biblical scenes from the Book of Genesis, there are depictions in the final two piédroits of the four evangelists with their usual attributes, with Mark and John on the left and Luke and Matthew on the right. We then have the voussures and in the double band are twenty one carvings depicting angels playing a variety of instruments; a veritable "Heavenly Host". Above the tympanum there is a small statue of the Virgin Mary with child. The remaining statuary can be found in the buttress niches. In the niche to the far left of the left buttress, there is a small version of the Virgin Mary before the cross. Her hands are clasped in prayer and she wears a veil. The right side buttress has Saint Suzanne in the central niche with another Virgin Mary and child in the first niche. Saint Suzanne reads a book and holds a folded scroll. In the final niche we have a depiction of Saint Ann teaching the Virgin Mary to read. Inside the church porch are statues of Christ and each of the apostles stood on a richly decorated domed dais.

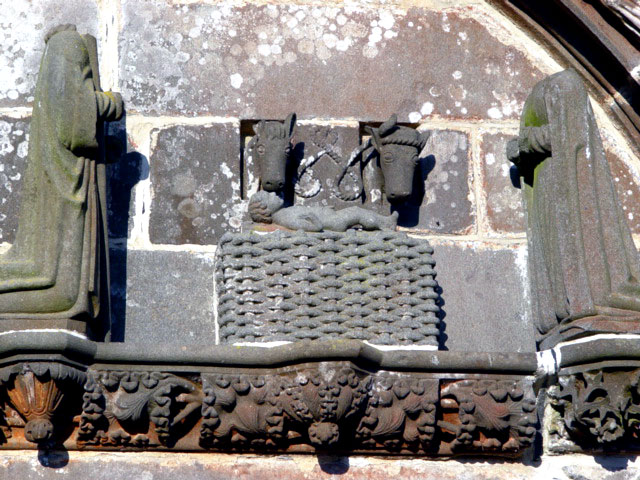
The Nativity scene in the tympanum above the entrance.

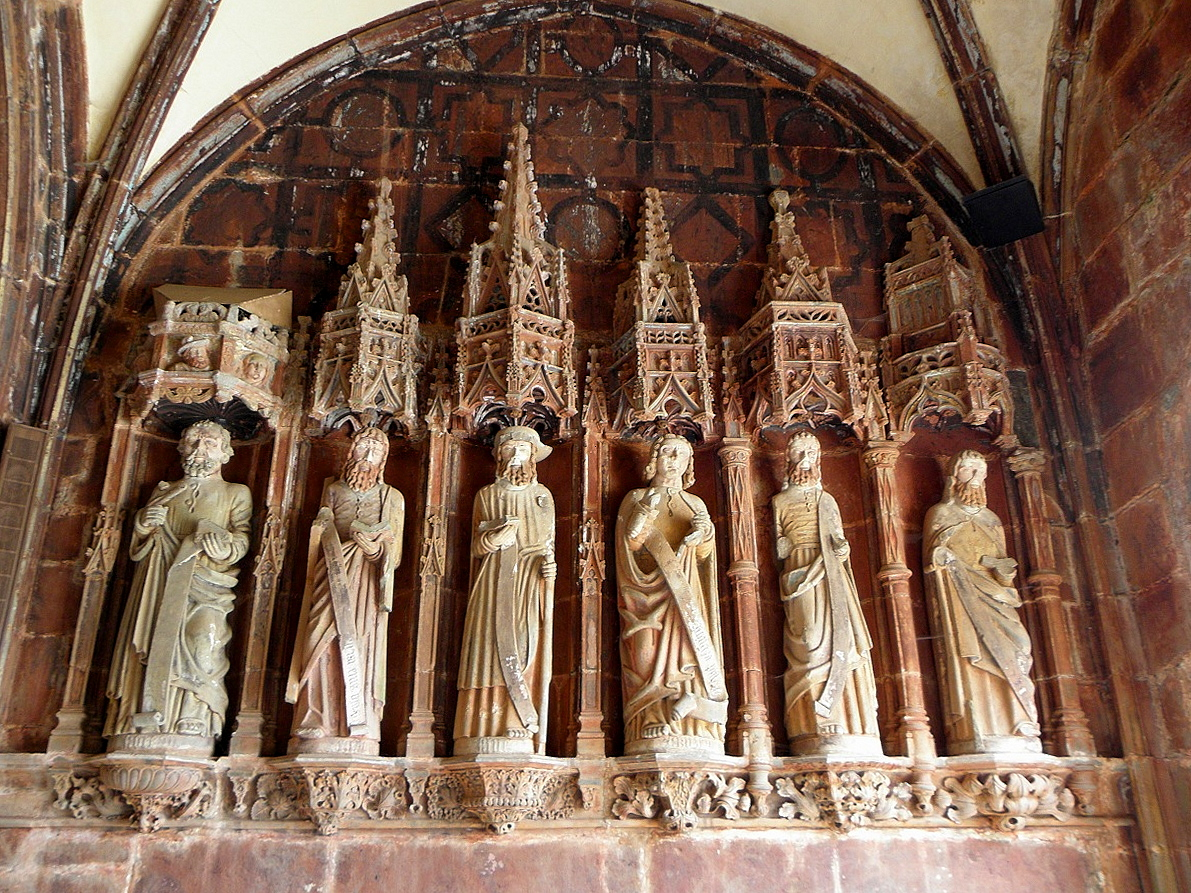
Inside the south porch are these statues depicting Saint Peter, Saint Andrew, Saint James the Greater, Saint John, Saint Thomas and Saint James the Lesser

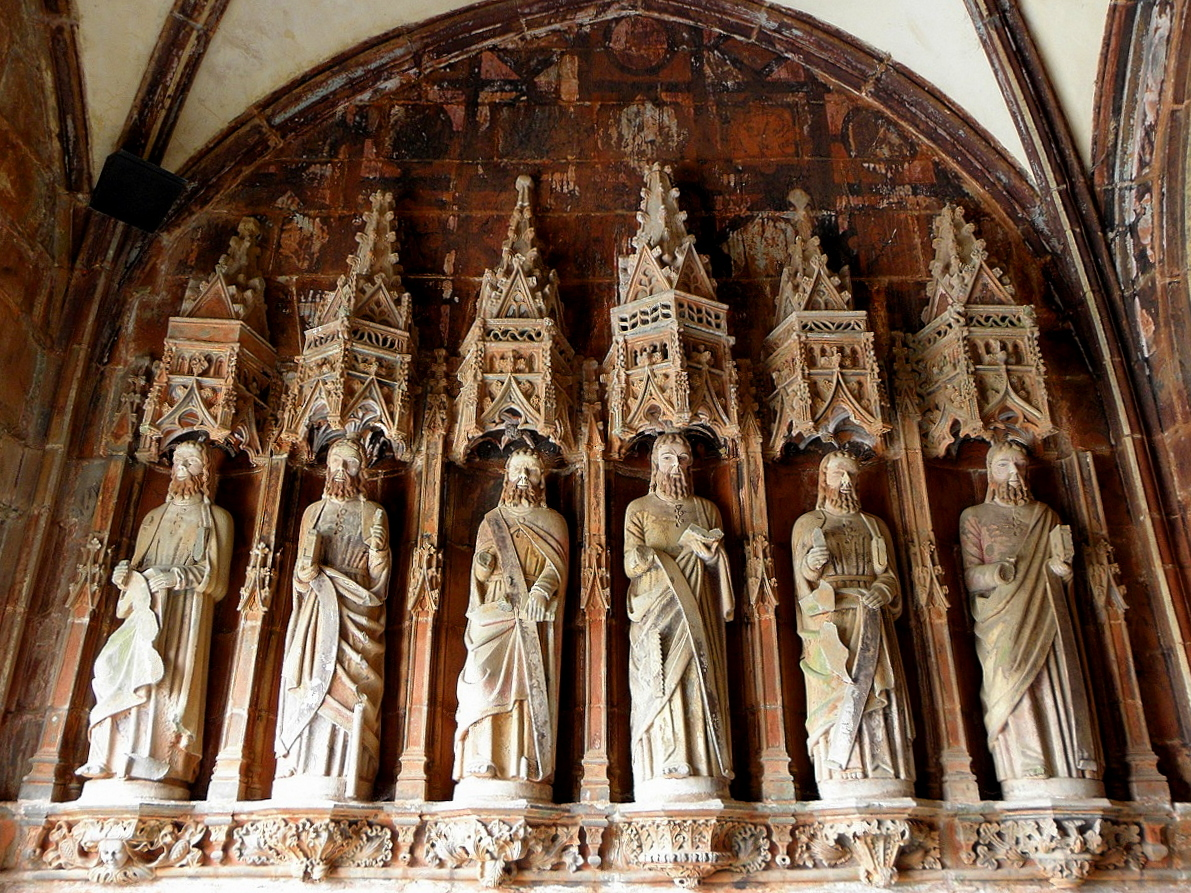
The statues of Saint Phillip, Saint Bartholomew, Saint Matthew, Saint Simon, Saint Thadeus and Saint Mathias

== The ossuary ==
The Renaissance style Pencran ossuary, with its triangular pediment and windows separated by ionic columns, dates to 1594 and an inscription in Breton announces that the Saint Eutrope chapel is there to receive the bones of the people ("CHAPEL.DA .SA : ITOP : DA : LAKAT : ESKERN : AN : POBL"). Today the ossuary is the private property of the Rosmorduc family.

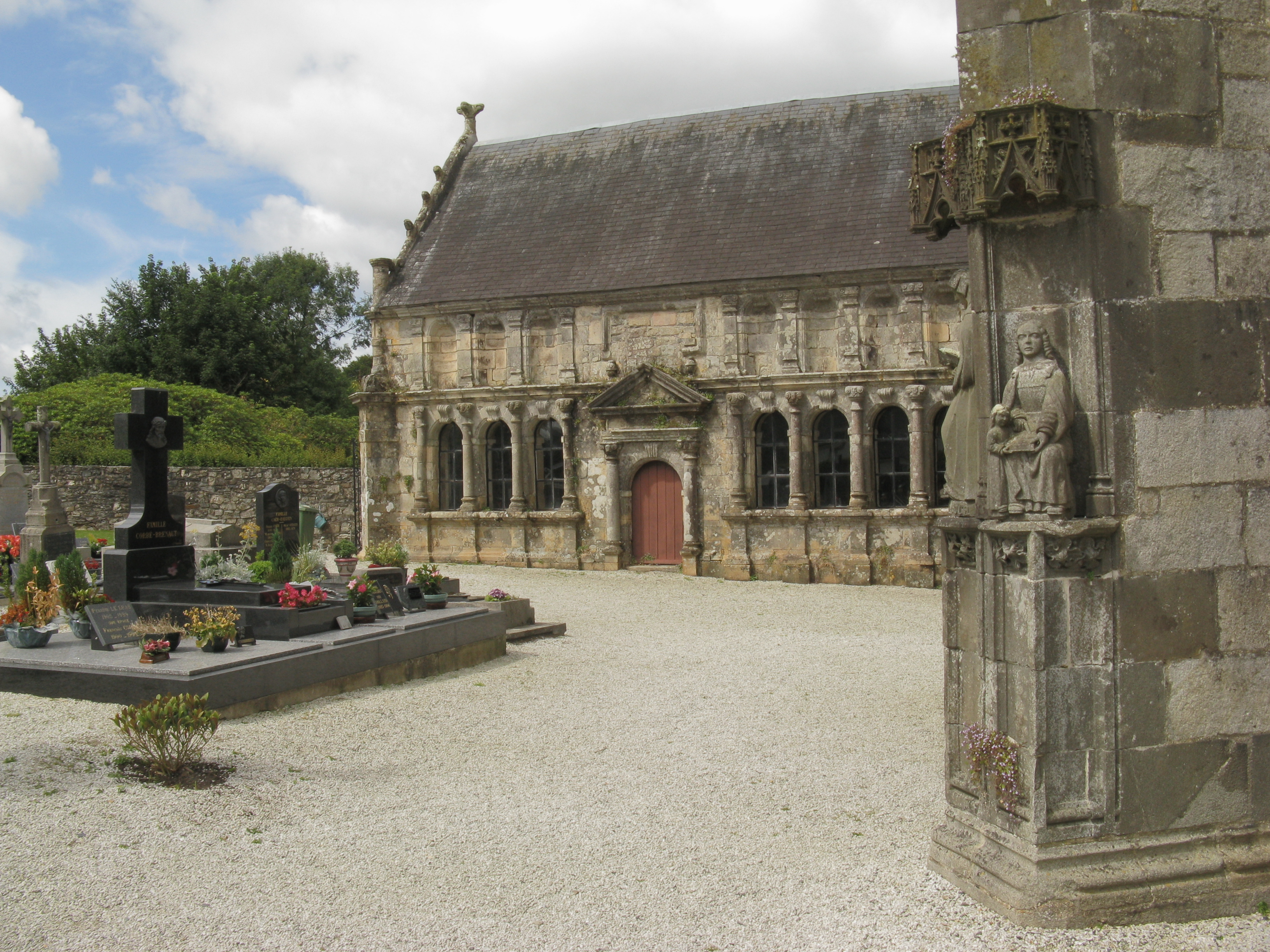
View of the Pencran ossuary with the triangular pediment over the entrance and ionic pillars on either side of each of the six windows

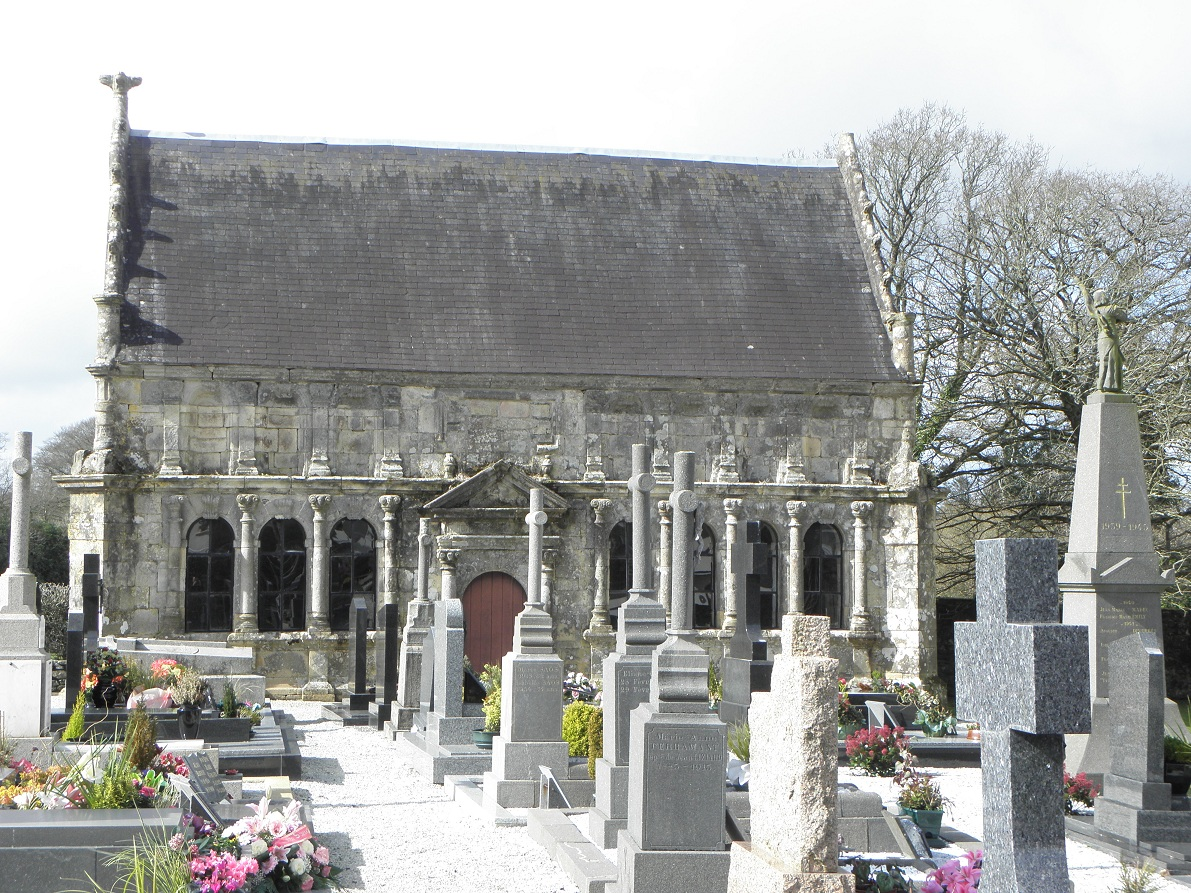
Another view of the ossuary

== The calvaries at Pencran ==
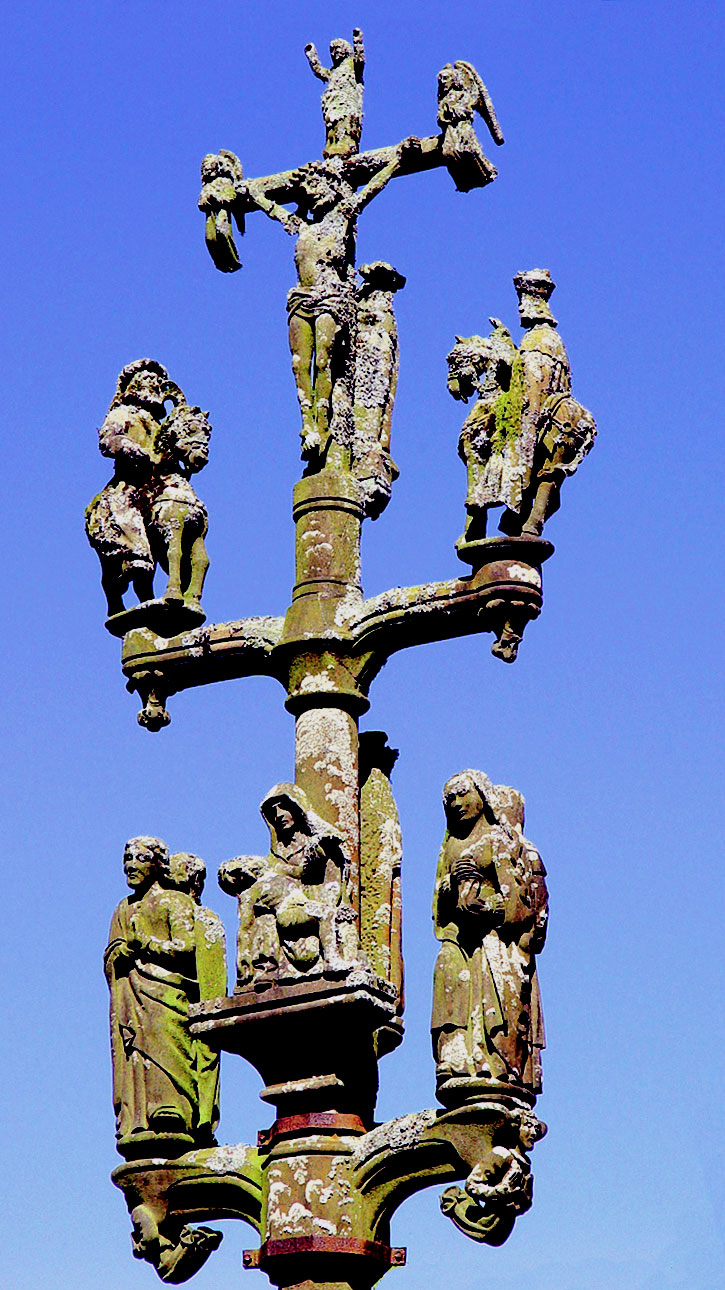
The cross at Pencran. On the lower crosspiece back to back statues depict Mary Magdalene reversed with Saint Yves and Saint John reversed with Saint Peter. The latter are on either side of Yann Larhantec's piéta. On the upper crosspiece two cavaliers on horseback turn their heads towards Christ. At the very top of the cross a small angel holds the soul of Jesus which she will take up to heaven. On the reverse of Jesus on the cross there is a sculpture depicting Jesus awaiting the crucifixion process

There are two calvaries at Pencran. That set back on the grass by the entrance to the enclosure set into the cemetery wall dates to 1521 and has a height of 7 metres. There are three crosses involved and the second and third crosses bearing the two robbers stand at either side of the entrance. The main cross can be accessed by stairways on either side and on one there is an inscription reading

AU MOYS DE MAY MIL VC VINGT UNG FURENT CESTES CROIX E MASSE FOUNDEES PAR JEHAN LE CAM, YVES LE JEUNE ET YVON CRAS PROCUREURS DE LA CHAPELLE DE CEANS E. R.

At the base of the central cross there is a sculpture depicting Mary Magdalene on her knees in prayer and looking up towards Jesus. Above Jesus a small angel waits to take his soul off to heaven. On the lower crosspiece we have back to back statues ("statues géminées") of Mary Magdalene with Saint Yves and John the Evangelist with Saint Peter. Between Mary Magdalene and Saint Yves there is a "Vierge de Pitié" sculpted by Yann Larhantec and between Saints John and Peter there is another depiction of the Virgin Mary. On the upper crosspiece are statues of two cavaliers on horseback both looking up at Jesus. On the reverse side of Jesus hanging on the cross there is an "Ecce Homo" or "Christ lié". A cast of this central cross was made in 1934 and can be seen in the Paris Musée des monuments français.

The second and smaller calvary is 6 metres high and is located in the south of the enclosure. It bears the inscription "MISSION 1869" and also has a statue depicting Mary Magdalene praying at the base of the cross. This cross has back to back statues of Saints John and Paul and the Virgin Mary and Saint Peter along with a sculpture depicting the Virgin Mary with child.

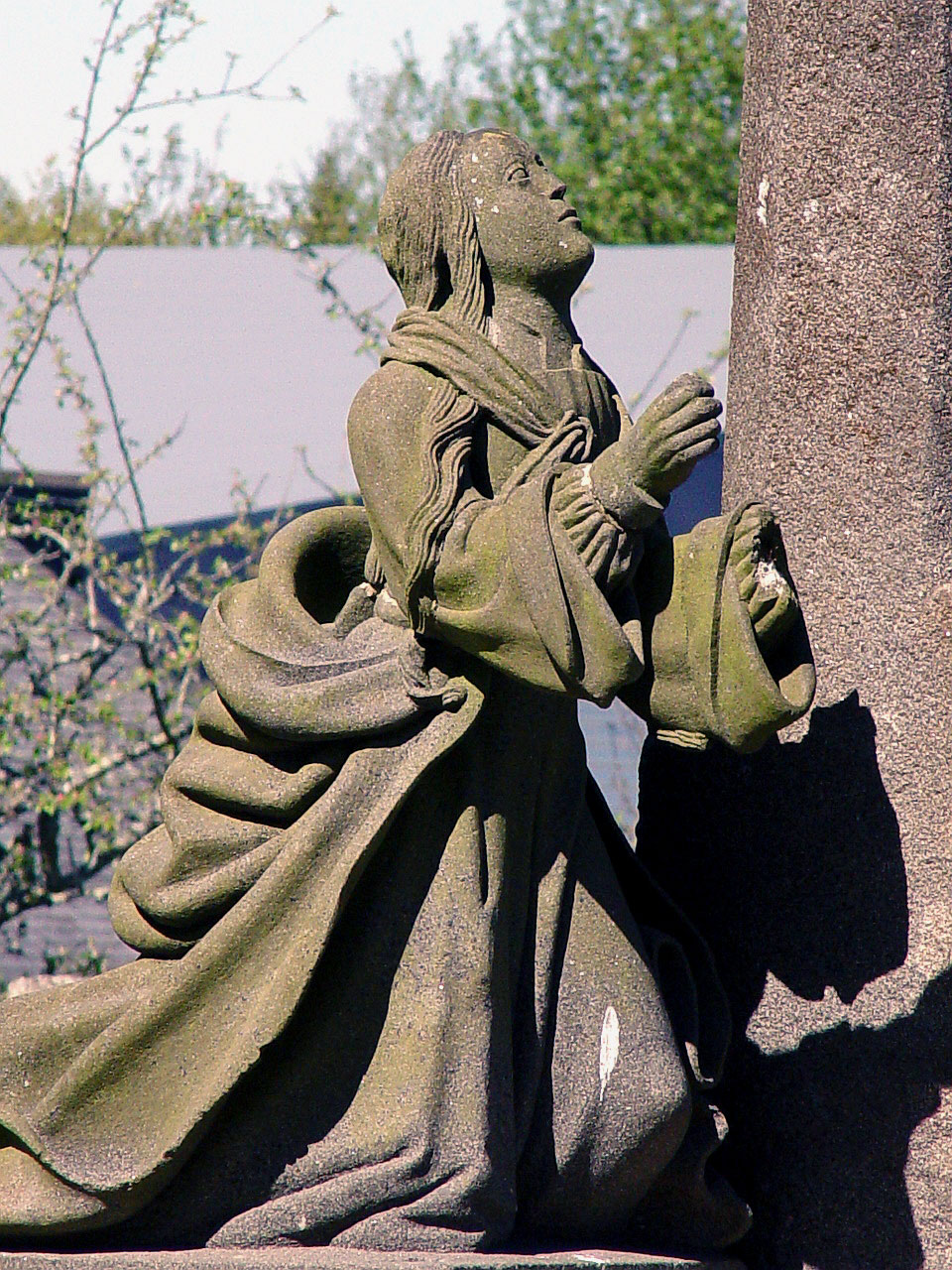
Mary Magdalene kneels in prayer at the foot of the cross

== Other statues outside the church ==
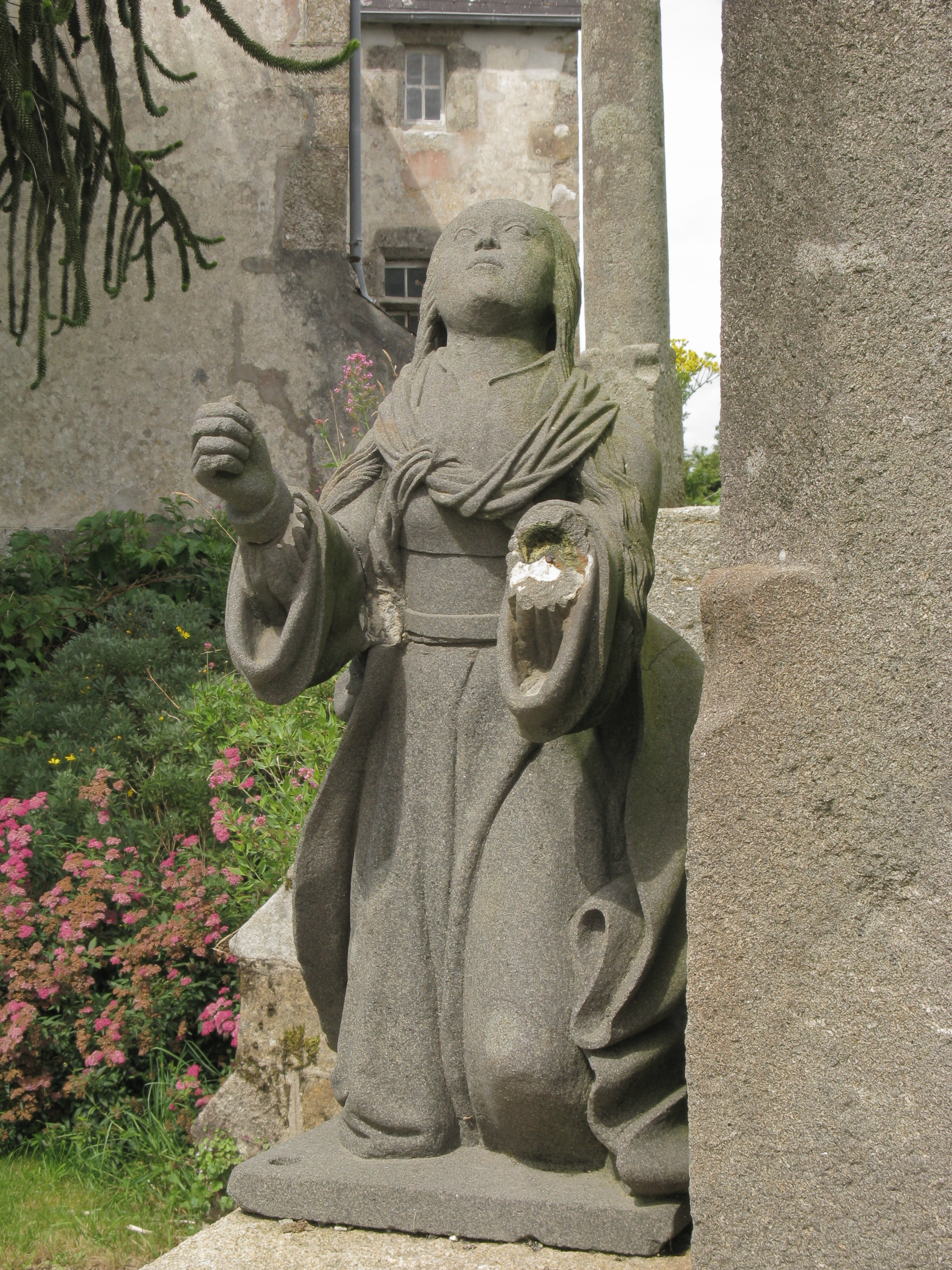
Statue of Mary Magdalene outside the Pencran church

On the grass on the north side of the church there is a statue of Mary Magdalene. She kneels and lifts her arms. Her head leans backwards and we can discern three tears running down her face. This statue has been attributed to Bastien Prigent.

== "The descent from the cross" altarpiece and other works inside the church ==
The interior of the church has benefited from much restoration. The church's nave is divided into three sections divided by a double row of ogive arches. The church has a 16th-century wooden altarpiece in high relief depicting the Lamentations with the Virgin Mary and others grouped around the body of Jesus which had just been brought down from the cross. The Virgin Mary is the centre of the composition with the body of Jesus stretched across her lap. She is accompanied by Saint John and Mary Magdalene. At their rear are various people including Joseph of Arimathea and Nicodemus and two servants who carry the crown of thorns. There is an inscription near the work reading "MIL V CEST XVII CENT FUST S DOUGUEL VROY IS". The church is rich in statues including Saint Hyacinthe, Saint Roch, Saint Maudit, Saint Herbot and Saint Eloi. Additionally there are statues of Saint Francis, Saint Yves and Saint Corentin. There is also a statue of Saint Appolline, the church's patron saint and another of St. Paul-Aurélien tethering his dragon with chains.

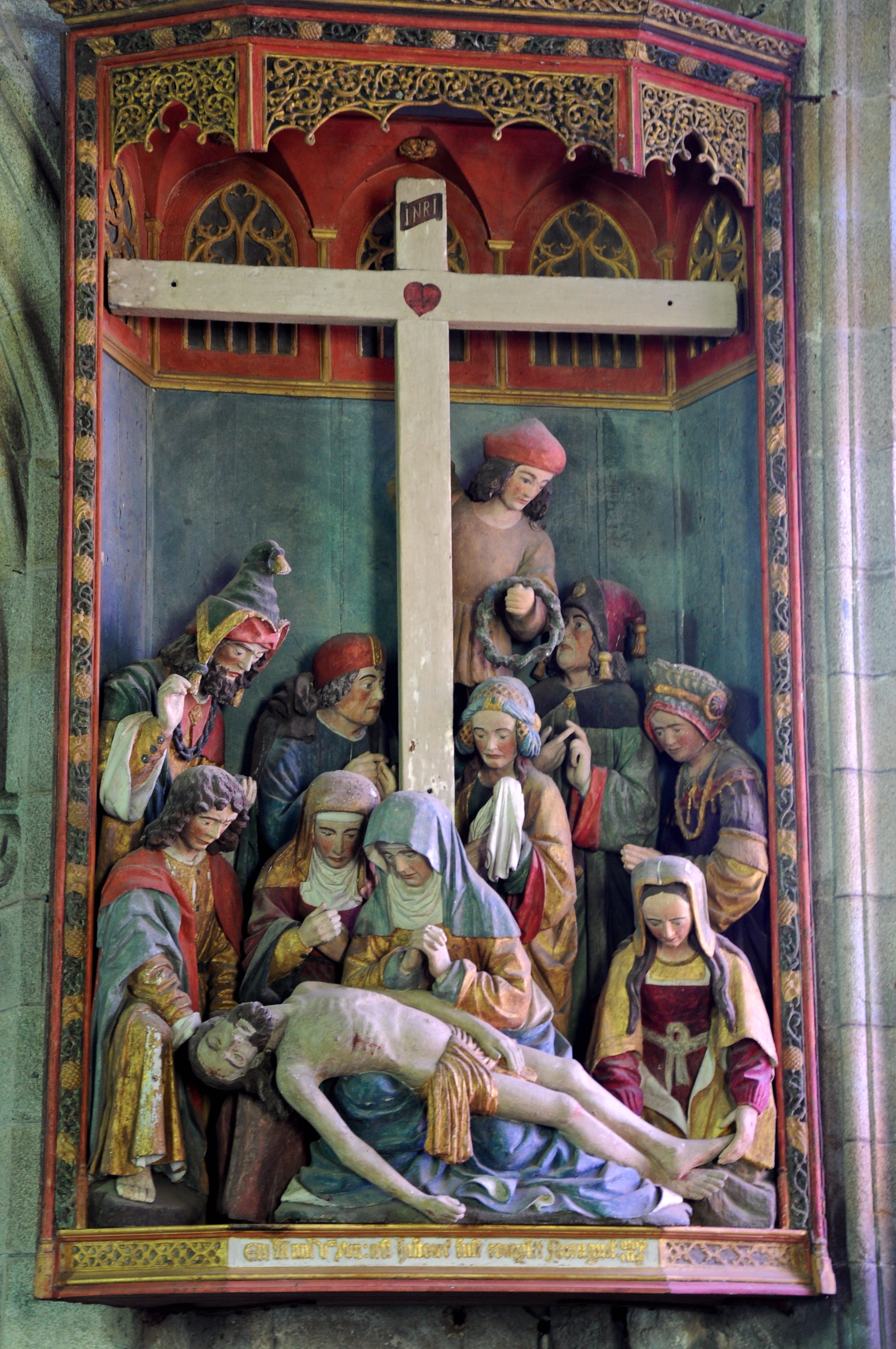
The descent from the cross.

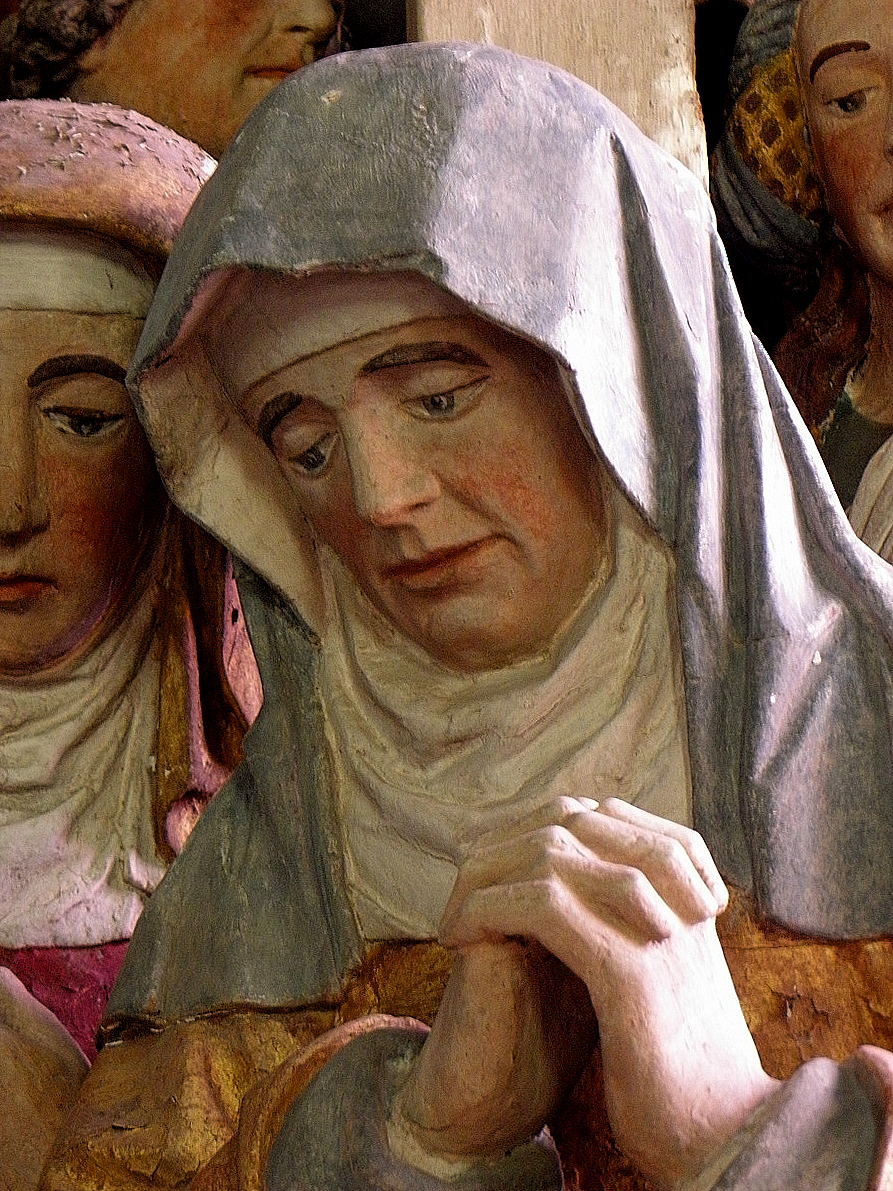
Study from the descent from the cross or the "déploration"

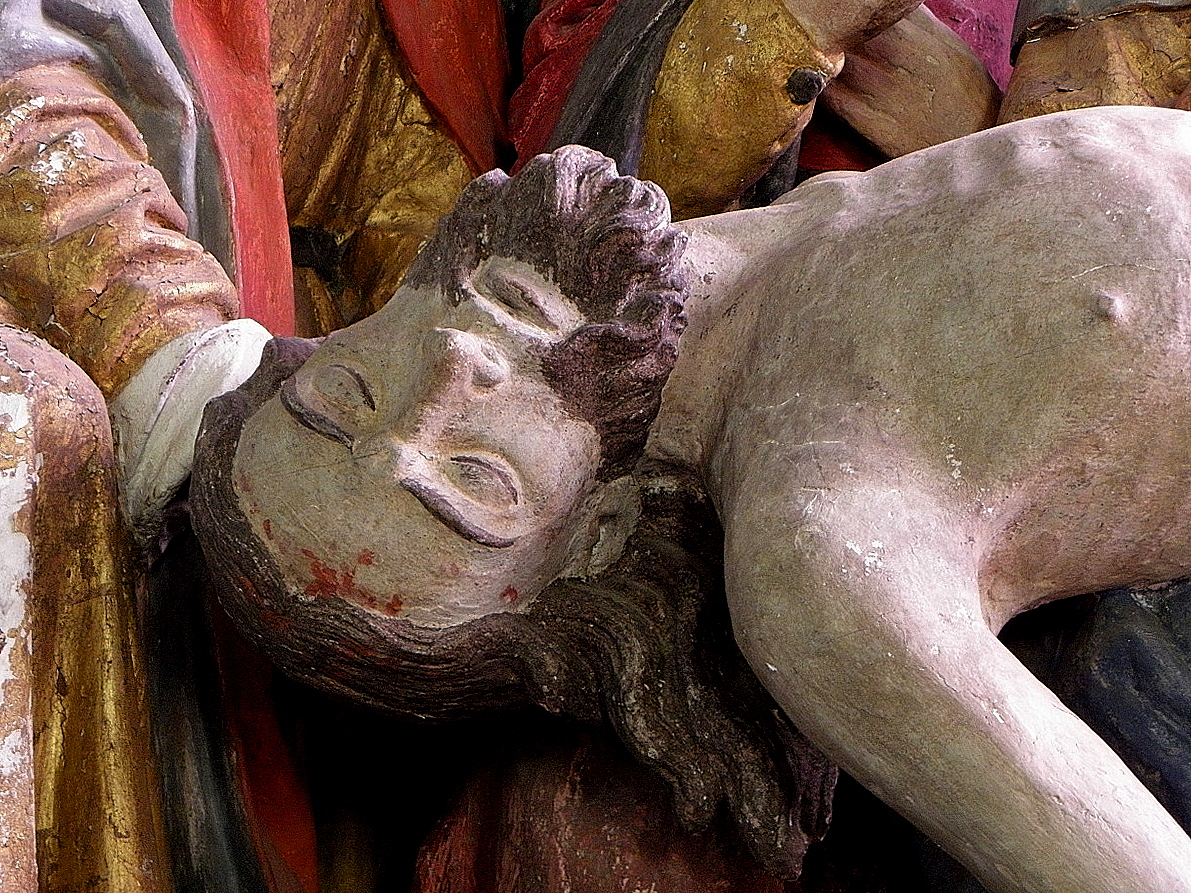
Study from the descent from the cross or the "déploration"

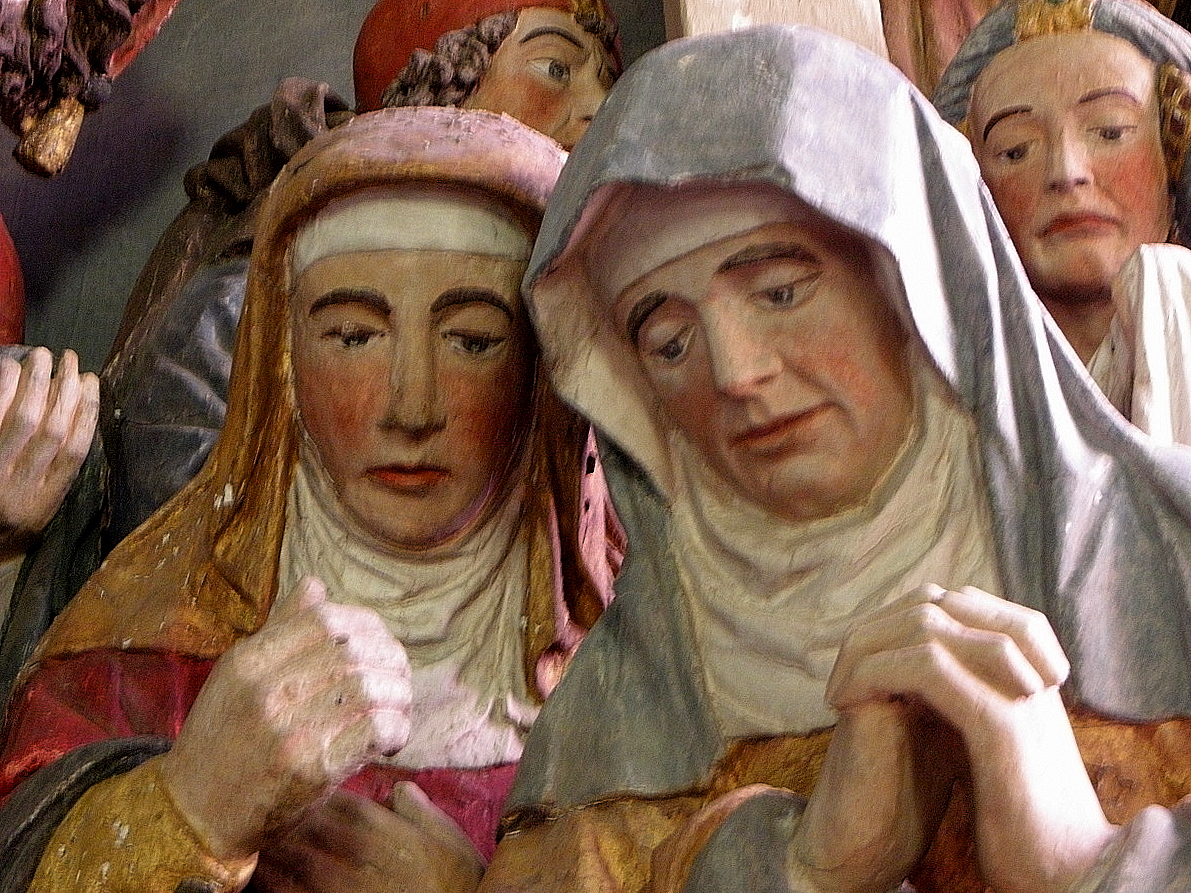
Study from the descent from the cross or the "déploration"

== See also ==
- List of the works of Bastien and Henry Prigent
