= Trémaouézan =

Trémaouézan Tremaouezan
- Commune
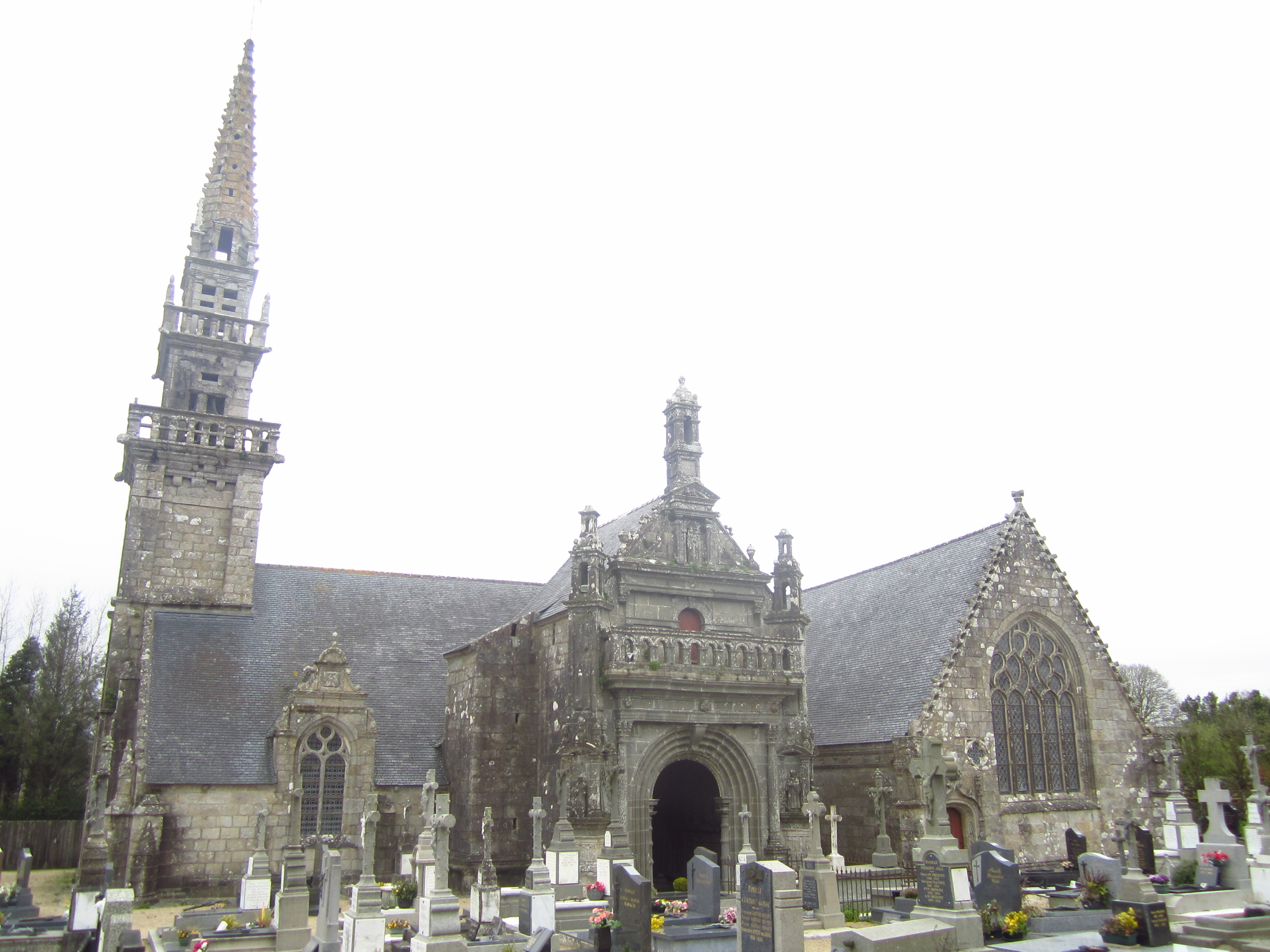
- The church of Our Lady, in Trémaouezan
- Location of Trémaouézan
- Location within France Location within Brittany
- Coordinates: 48°30′21″N 4°15′13″W
- Country: France
- Region: Brittany
- Department: Finistère
- Arrondissement: Brest
- Canton: Landerneau
- Intercommunality: CA Pays de Landerneau-Daoulas

Government
  - Mayor (2020–2026): Hervé Liegeois
- Area^{1}: 8.30 km^{2} (3.20 sq mi)
- Highest elevation: 102 m (335 ft)
- Lowest elevation: 77 m (253 ft)
- Population (2023): 483
  - Density: 58.2/km^{2} (151/sq mi)
- Time zone: UTC+01:00 (CET)
  - Summer (DST): UTC+02:00 (CEST)
- INSEE/Postal code: 29295 /29800
- ^{1} French Land Register data, which excludes lakes, ponds, glaciers > 1 km^{2} (0.386 sq mi or 247 acres) and river estuaries.

Trémaouézan (French pronunciation: [tʁemawezɑ̃]; Breton: Tremaouezan) is a commune in the Finistère department of Brittany in north-western France.

== Population ==
Inhabitants of Trémaouézan are called in French tréviens.

== See also ==
- Communes of the Finistère department
- List of the works of Bastien and Henry Prigent
- Trémaouézan Parish close
