= Pencran =

Pencran Penn-ar-C'hrann
- Commune
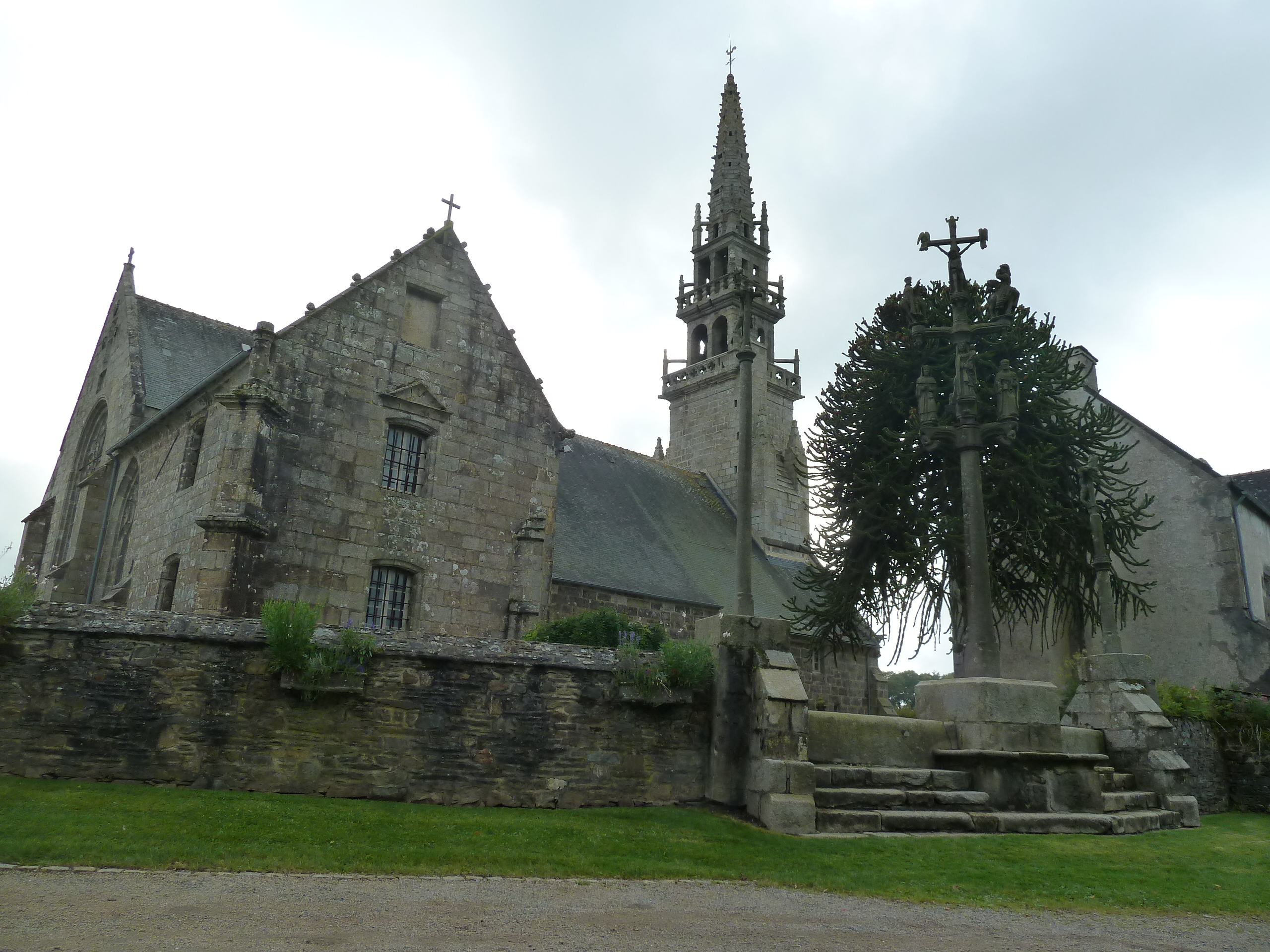
- The church in Pencran

- Coat of arms
- Location of Pencran
- Location within France Location within Brittany
- Coordinates: 48°26′19″N 4°14′01″W
- Country: France
- Region: Brittany
- Department: Finistère
- Arrondissement: Brest
- Canton: Landerneau
- Intercommunality: CA Pays de Landerneau-Daoulas

Government
  - Mayor (2020–2026): Stéphane Hervoir
- Area^{1}: 8.93 km^{2} (3.45 sq mi)
- Highest elevation: 175 m (574 ft)
- Lowest elevation: 1 m (3.3 ft)
- Population (2023): 2,234
  - Density: 250/km^{2} (648/sq mi)
- Time zone: UTC+01:00 (CET)
  - Summer (DST): UTC+02:00 (CEST)
- INSEE/Postal code: 29156 /29800
- ^{1} French Land Register data, which excludes lakes, ponds, glaciers > 1 km^{2} (0.386 sq mi or 247 acres) and river estuaries.

Pencran (French pronunciation: [pɛ̃kʁɑ̃]; Breton: Penn-ar-C'hrann) is a commune in the Finistère department of Brittany in north-western France.

== Geography ==
=== Climate ===
Pencran has an oceanic climate (Köppen climate classification Cfb). The average annual temperature in Pencran is 11.6 °C (52.9 °F). The average annual rainfall is 1,465.0 mm (57.68 in) with December as the wettest month. The temperatures are highest on average in August, at around 17.3 °C (63.1 °F), and lowest in January, at around 6.8 °C (44.2 °F). The highest temperature ever recorded in Pencran was 35.6 °C (96.1 °F) on 9 August 2003; the coldest temperature ever recorded was −8.1 °C (17.4 °F) on 2 January 1997.

Climate data for Pencran (1981–2010 averages, extremes 1992−2011)
Month	Jan	Feb	Mar	Apr	May	Jun	Jul	Aug	Sep	Oct	Nov	Dec	Year
Record high °C (°F)	15.2 (59.4)	18.2 (64.8)	23.9 (75.0)	25.7 (78.3)	28.2 (82.8)	31.5 (88.7)	34.8 (94.6)	35.6 (96.1)	29.3 (84.7)	28.2 (82.8)	19.0 (66.2)	15.2 (59.4)	35.6 (96.1)
Mean daily maximum °C (°F)	9.3 (48.7)	10.0 (50.0)	12.1 (53.8)	14.0 (57.2)	17.0 (62.6)	19.9 (67.8)	21.2 (70.2)	21.7 (71.1)	19.7 (67.5)	16.1 (61.0)	12.1 (53.8)	9.5 (49.1)	15.2 (59.4)
Daily mean °C (°F)	6.8 (44.2)	7.1 (44.8)	8.6 (47.5)	10.0 (50.0)	12.8 (55.0)	15.5 (59.9)	17.0 (62.6)	17.3 (63.1)	15.4 (59.7)	12.7 (54.9)	9.3 (48.7)	6.8 (44.2)	11.6 (52.9)
Mean daily minimum °C (°F)	4.3 (39.7)	4.2 (39.6)	5.0 (41.0)	6.0 (42.8)	8.6 (47.5)	11.1 (52.0)	12.7 (54.9)	13.0 (55.4)	11.1 (52.0)	9.3 (48.7)	6.5 (43.7)	4.1 (39.4)	8.0 (46.4)
Record low °C (°F)	−8.1 (17.4)	−4.5 (23.9)	−4.1 (24.6)	−1.0 (30.2)	1.0 (33.8)	5.2 (41.4)	6.5 (43.7)	7.3 (45.1)	4.9 (40.8)	−2.0 (28.4)	−3.0 (26.6)	−5.8 (21.6)	−8.1 (17.4)
Average precipitation mm (inches)	170.9 (6.73)	135.5 (5.33)	100.2 (3.94)	109.9 (4.33)	103.9 (4.09)	71.7 (2.82)	85.0 (3.35)	81.8 (3.22)	104.9 (4.13)	144.5 (5.69)	174.4 (6.87)	182.3 (7.18)	1,465 (57.68)
Average precipitation days (≥ 1.0 mm)	17.8	14.7	13.7	13.7	12.2	9.3	12.2	10.2	10.2	15.2	18.1	17.8	165.1
Source: Meteociel

== Population ==
Inhabitants of Pencran are called in French Pencranais.

Historical population
Year	Pop.	±% p.a.
1968	538	—
1975	757	+5.00%
1982	1,060	+4.93%
1990	1,182	+1.37%
1999	1,253	+0.65%
2007	1,475	+2.06%
2012	1,823	+4.33%
2017	1,970	+1.56%
2023	2,234	+2.12%
Source: INSEE

== Notable Pencranais ==
Paul Le Guen, former football player and former Rangers F.C manager

== See also ==
- Communes of the Finistère department
- Pencran Parish close
