= Trémaouézan Parish close =

Parish close in Trémaouézan, Brittany, France

Coordinates: 48.5042°N 4.2547°W

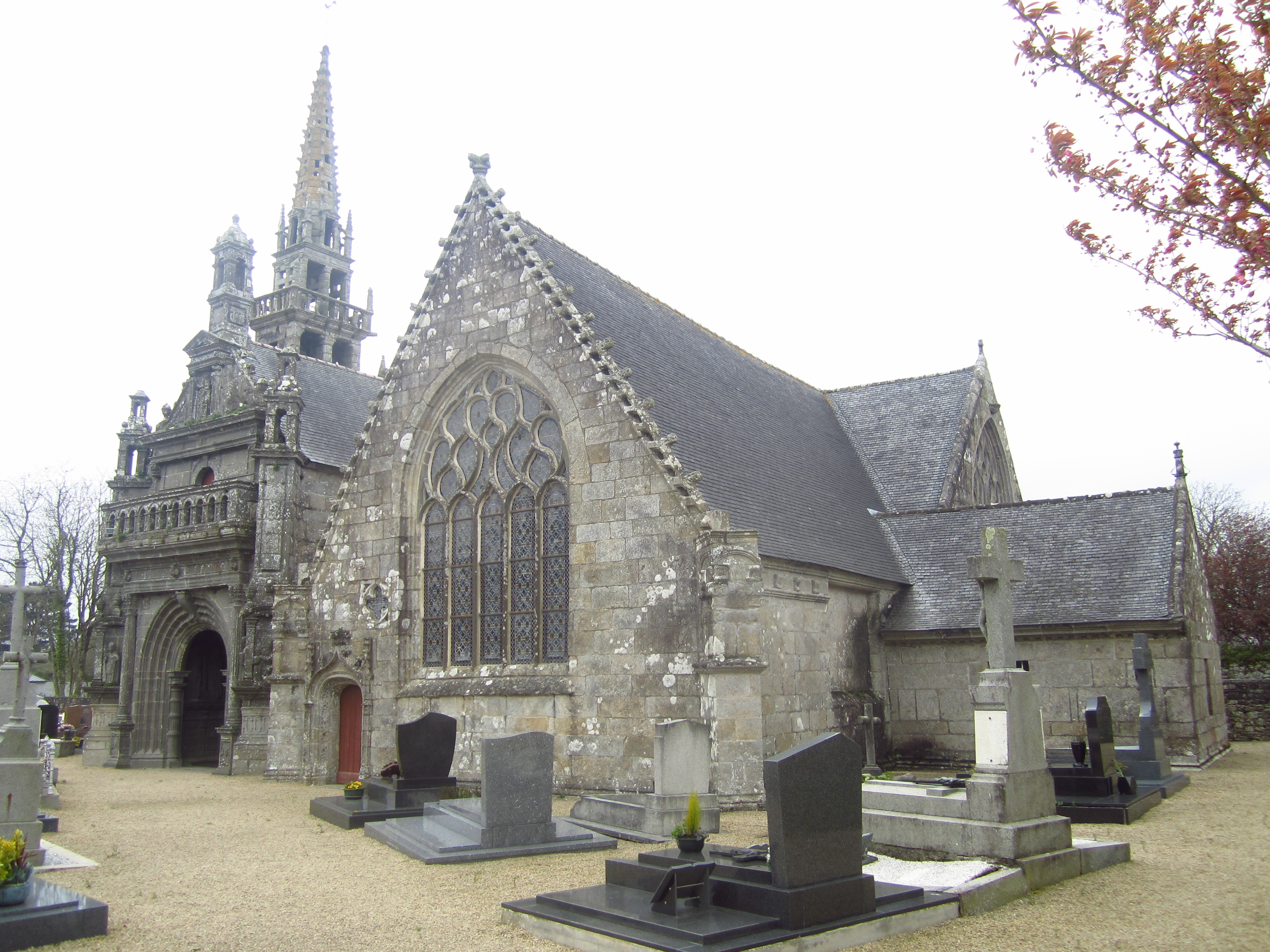
View of the church at Trémaouézan

Trémaouézan Parish close (Enclos paroissial) is located at Trémaouézan in the arrondissement of Brest in Brittany in north-western France. The enclosure includes the Notre-Dame church, ossuary, and calvary. The church was built in the 15th Century and much enlarged in 1597 when the chapel was added. The Renaissance porch, located on the south side of the church, was added in 1610 with statues of the apostles. The calvary separates the church from the ossuary. Inside the church are a notable baptismal font and a number of wood carvings dating to the 17th century. The bell tower is of the "léonard" style. It was hit by lightning in 1702 but restored in 1714. There is a note in the church archives dated 1713, recording that many women sold their rings to help fund the reconstruction. It is a listed historical monument.

== Ossuary ==
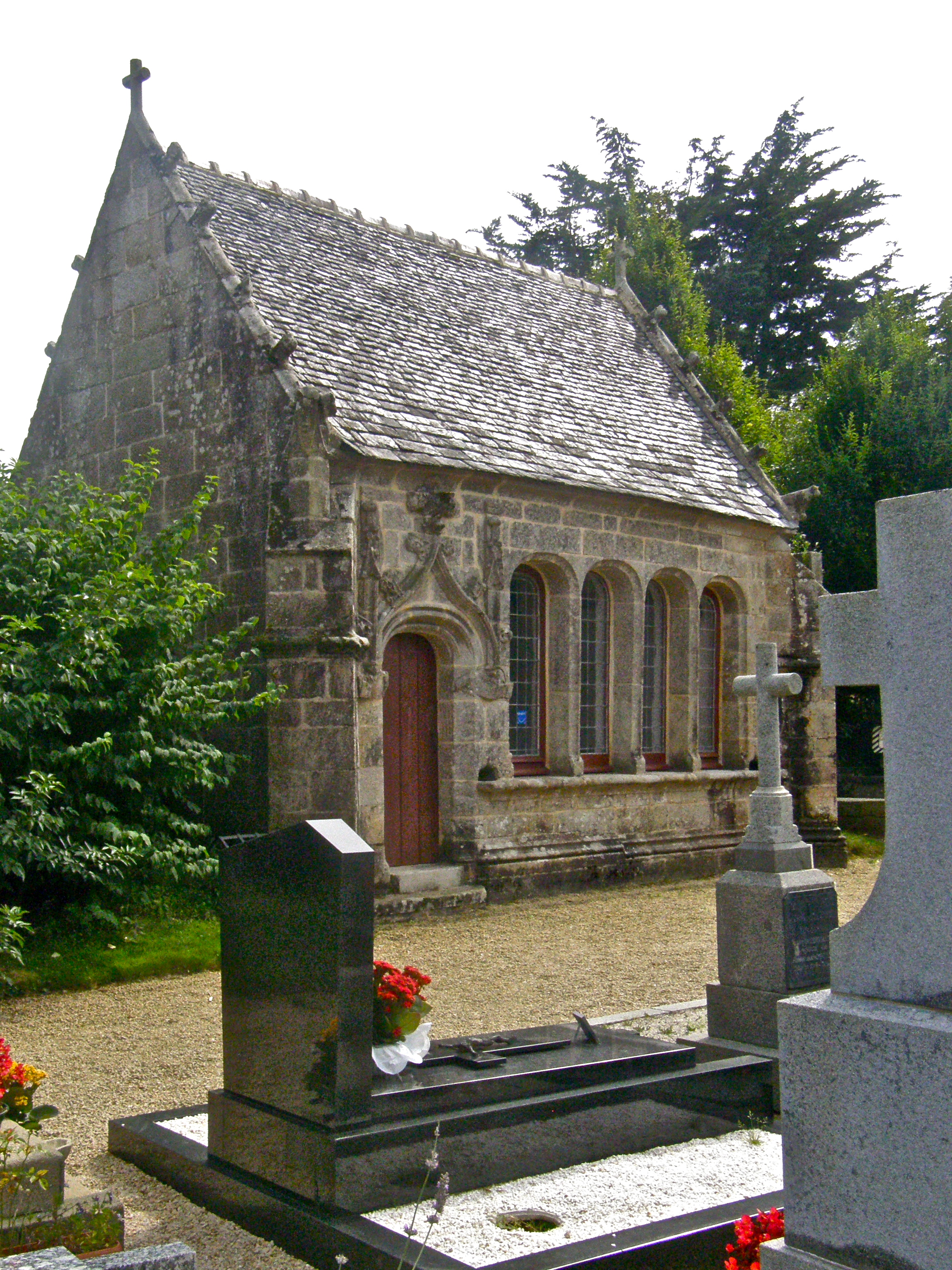
The ossuary at Trémaouézan

This Gothic style building has an elegant door decorated with two angels bearing inscriptions, one in French, the other in Breton. This translates as "Cursed be those who speak ill and

== Main altar and stained glass window ==
The choir was redesigned on two occasions in the 20th century. The stained glass window depicts scenes from Pentecost in the central panel and in the side panels, the Annunciation and the Nativity on one side and the Resurrection and the Assumption on the other. The tabernacle on the main altar is the work of the sculptor Yves Rolland.

== Baptistry ==
The font is surmounted by a baldachin supported by six Corinthian columns. It comprises a spectacular dome with niches in which are statues of the apostles and to the rear of the whole structure are three statues recreating the scene of Jesus' baptism. Jesus himself is shown with John the Baptist whilst an angel stands to Jesus' rear holding his cloak. A font in rose-coloured marble replaced the original font in 1860.

== Saint Sebastian altarpiece ==
The altarpiece, one of a total of five in the church, features a painting depicting Saint Sebastian and Saint Roch. Both were saints invoked as protection against the plague and appear frequently in the decoration in parish closes of the Élorn valley. The tree to which Saint Sebastian is tied, whilst pierced by arrows, carries the growths, called "bubons", which were one of the symptoms of the plague. In his left hand he holds a palm, the symbol in religious art of martyrdom. In the painting Saint Roch, who died from leprosy, lifts his cloak to show the sores on his leg. When he lived as a hermit, legend has it that a dog brought him his daily bread, and the painting includes a dog.

== Saint Anne altarpiece ==
Saint Anne sits with a book of holy writings on her lap. She rests her right hand on the book and with one finger of the other hand she touches the finger of Jesus. Next to her the Virgin Mary has Jesus on her lap. He stands with open arms and above him is a dove with open wings. The baroque surrounding depicts Saint Pol at the top slaying a dragon and features an angel blowing a trumpet. The altarpiece also has a 1560 statue of Saint Germaine of Auxerre. The Saint Anne altarpiece is the work of Hervé and Jacques Le Roux, painters and sculptors.

== "Notre-Dame" altarpiece ==
This altarpiece includes a statue of the Virgin Mary with child and on the pedestal is a sign reading "Notre Dame du Mont Carmel". There is also a statue of Saint Joseph, also holding a baby and an "Ecce Homo".

== Altar of the dead ==
The baroque altar is shaped like a tomb and is decorated with skull and crossbones. A painting depicting purgatory stands between two sculptures. In the painting an angel flies beneath Jesus whilst two women raise their hands upwards and another two look up at him. In the centre a man seems to be calling to the onlooker to take note of what he is seeing.

== South porch ==
The porch here is a fine example of the great south porches of the parish enclosures. It was built in 1610 and greets visitors with the words "DOMVS : MEA : DOMVS : ORATIONIS : VOCABITVR" or "My house will be called the house of prayer". The facade is a splendid example of Renaissance architecture and a statue of the Virgin Mary is positioned over the entrance. There is a campanile at the very top.

== Statues in the south porch ==
The Holy Father wearing a papal crown holds in his hands the still body of his son, a variant on the more usual pietà where Jesus is held by his mother. By his side are statues of Saint Vincent Ferrier and Saint Gouesnou. The fourth statue is of Saint Fiacre, the gardener monk with his large ears, such ears said to be essential for the good gardener.

== Porch interior ==
The porch interior is as remarkable as the façade with Roland Doré statues of the apostles each on a dais surmounted by the carving of a crescent moon. Two doors framed by a Gothic arch then give access to the church itself and above them is a statue of the Virgin Mary with child.

== Other images ==
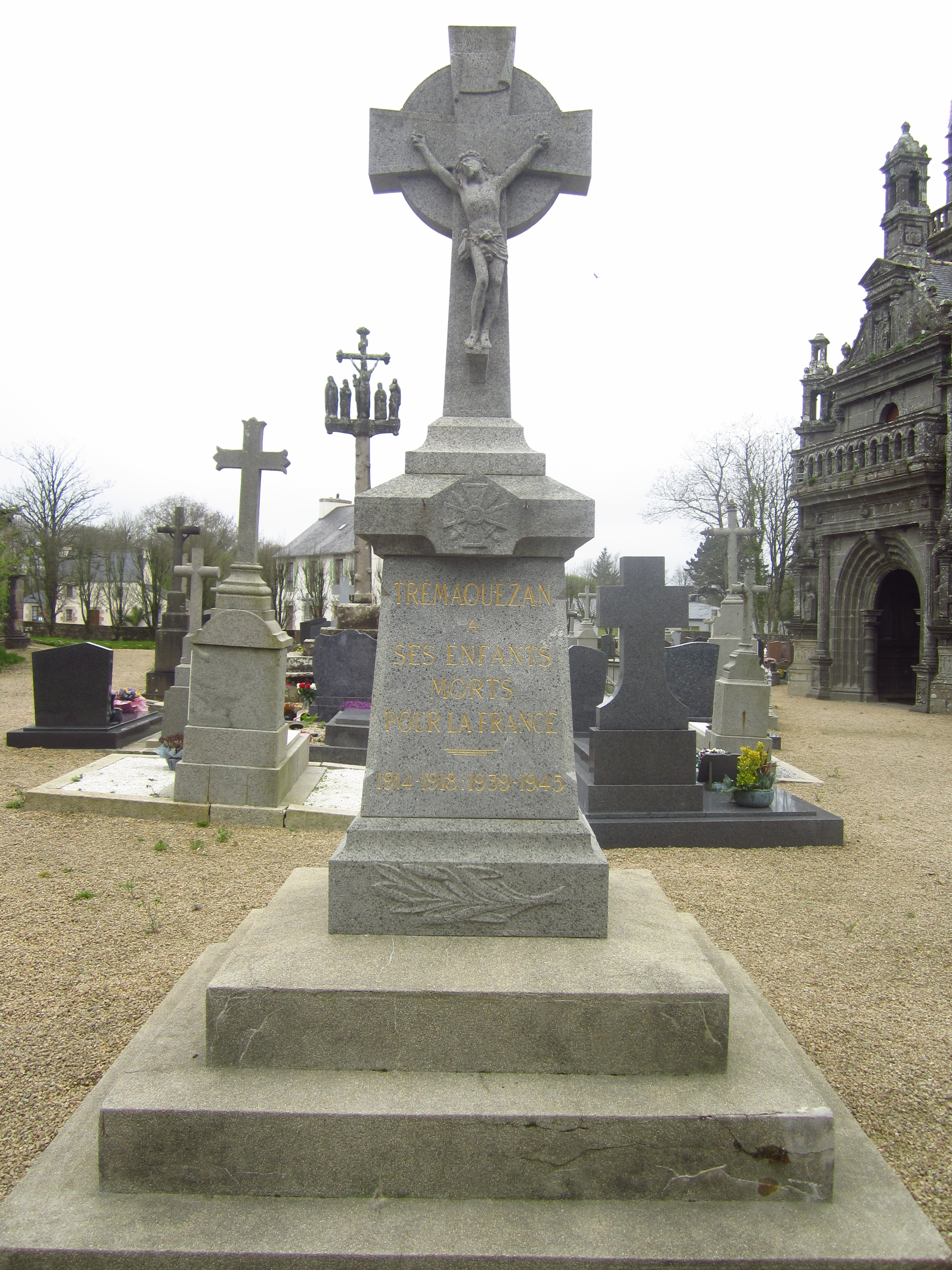
War memorial with distant view of calvary

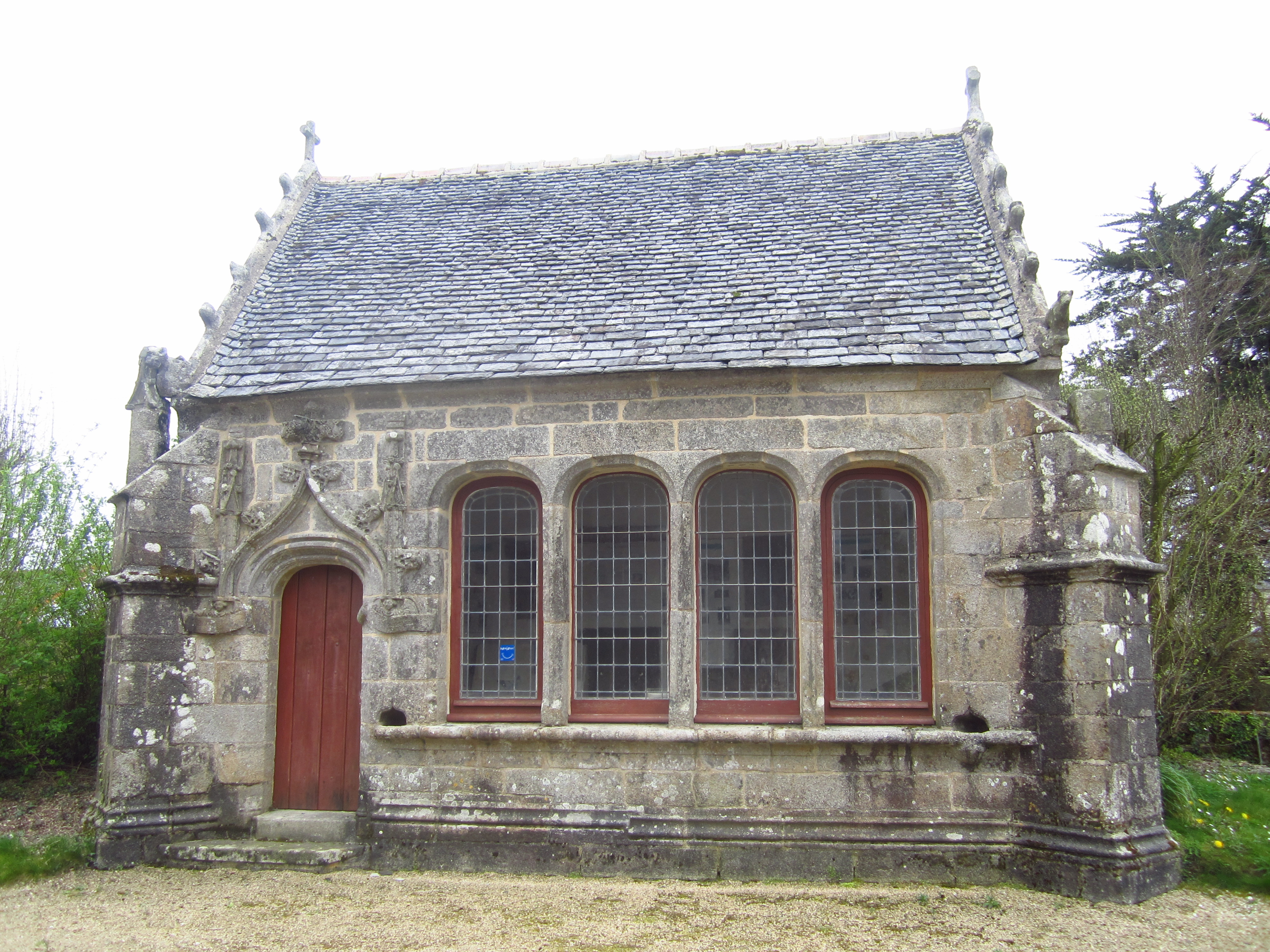
Another view of the ossuary

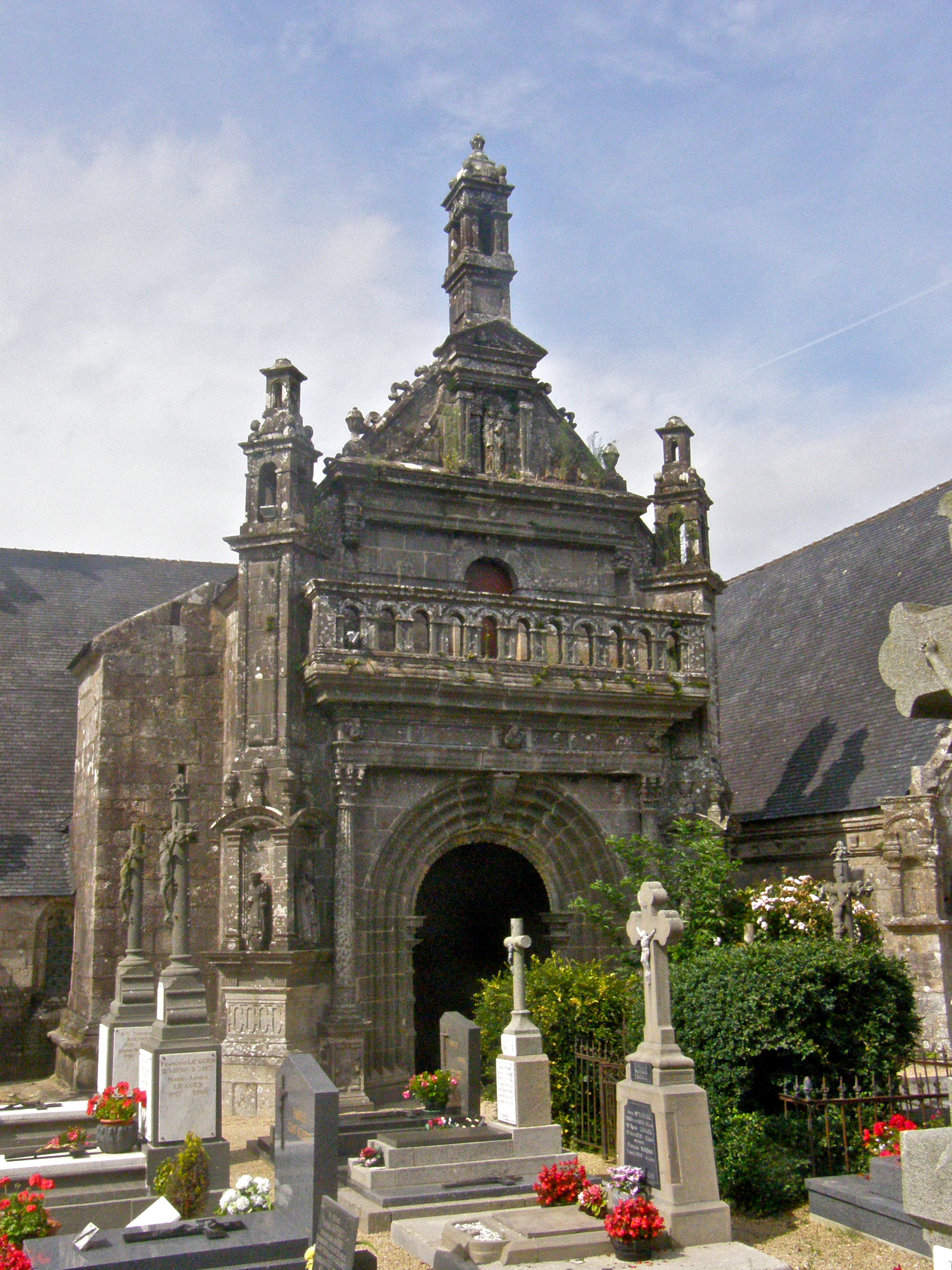
The south porch
