= Lanneuffret Parish close =

Coordinates: 48.4982°N 4.2041°W

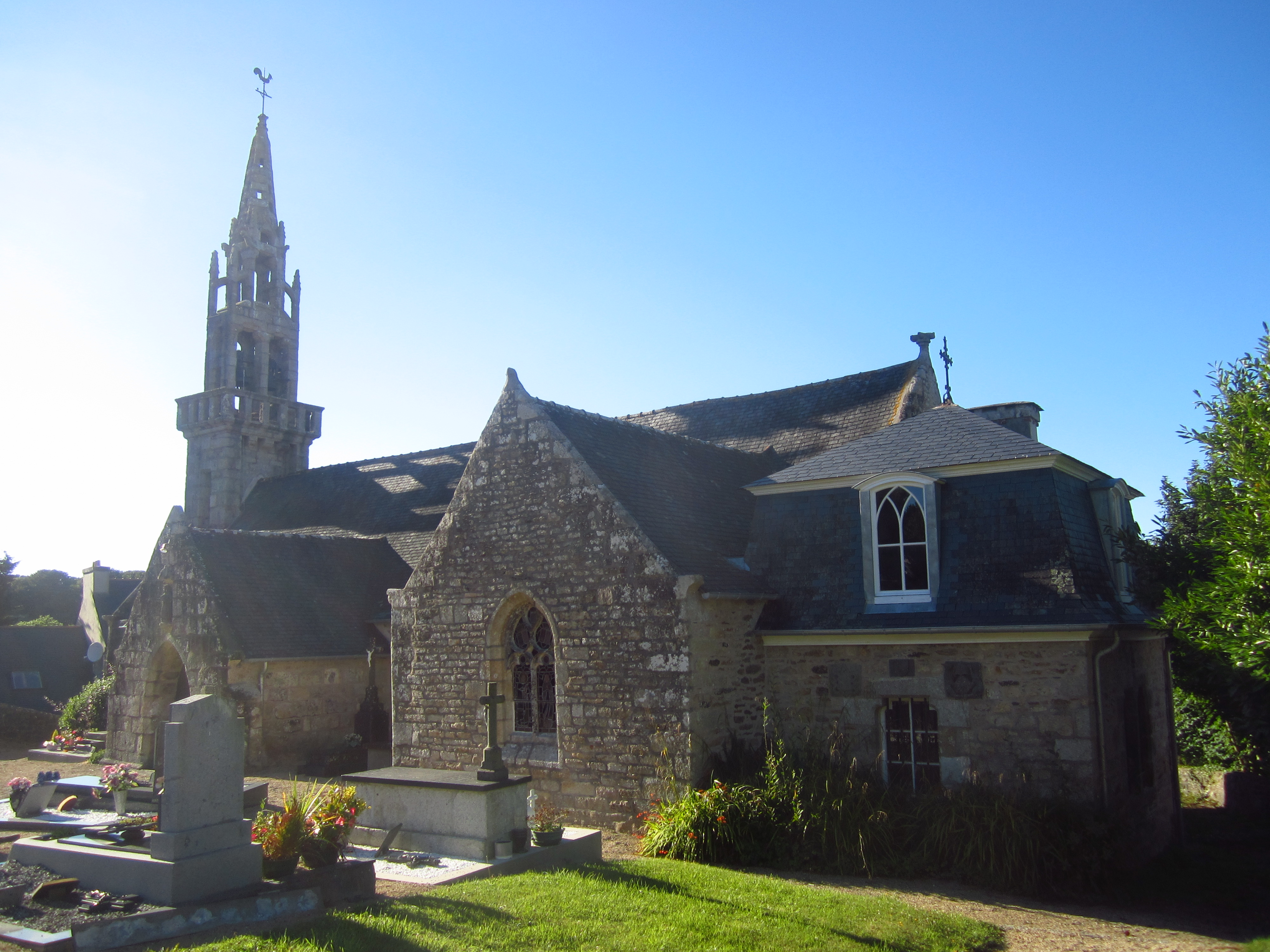
The parish church at Lanneuffret

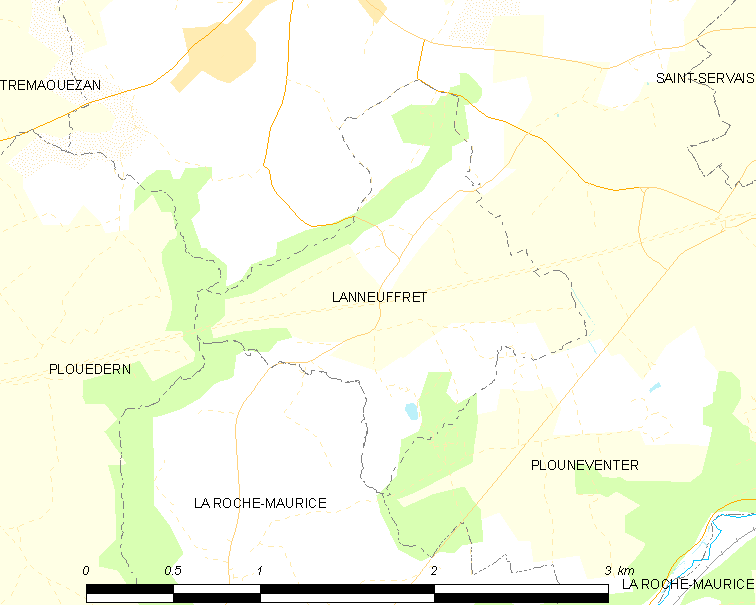
Map showing location Lanneuffret

The Lanneuffret Parish close (Enclos paroissial) is located at Lanneuffret in the Brest arrondissement in Brittany in north-western France. The enclos comprises the T-shaped church of Saint Guévroc which dates to 1585 and a calvary in the cemetery. At a later date the sacristy was added to the church's chevet. The enclosure is accessed by a gateway decorated with two crosses.

== The porch ==
In a niche on the façade of the porch is a statue of a monk, probably the patron of the church, Saint Guévroc. He holds a book to his chest.

== Rood screen ==
The church has a rood screen ("poutre de gloire") with a depiction on it of the crucified Christ.

== The calvary ==
This is made from Kersanton stone and stands in the cemetery. The depiction of Christ on the cross faces to the east and on the reverse side is a Pietà. The "reversed" figures (géminées) are the Virgin Mary and Saint Guévroc and Saint John backing to a "Ecce Homo".

== Other architectural features ==
The tracery on the window at the south of the nave replicates the Fleur de Lis. This is unusual in Léon. The pulpit has medallions depicting the four evangelists. There are many statues in the church including a 1.25 metre stone depiction of a bishop or abbot possibly Saint Guévroc, a seated Saint Anne teaching the Virgin Mary to read and an "Ecce Homo". The baptismal font is inscribed "QVI : CREDIDERIT : ET : BAPTISATVS : FVERIT : SALVUS : ERIT" (Latin for "whoever believes and is baptised shall be saved", from Mark 16:16), and the door of the altar's tabernacle depicts an open book with a lamb laying across it. In a field just by the enclosure, the Saint-Guévroc fountain has a little sculpture of Saint-Guévroc.
