= List of Breton saints =

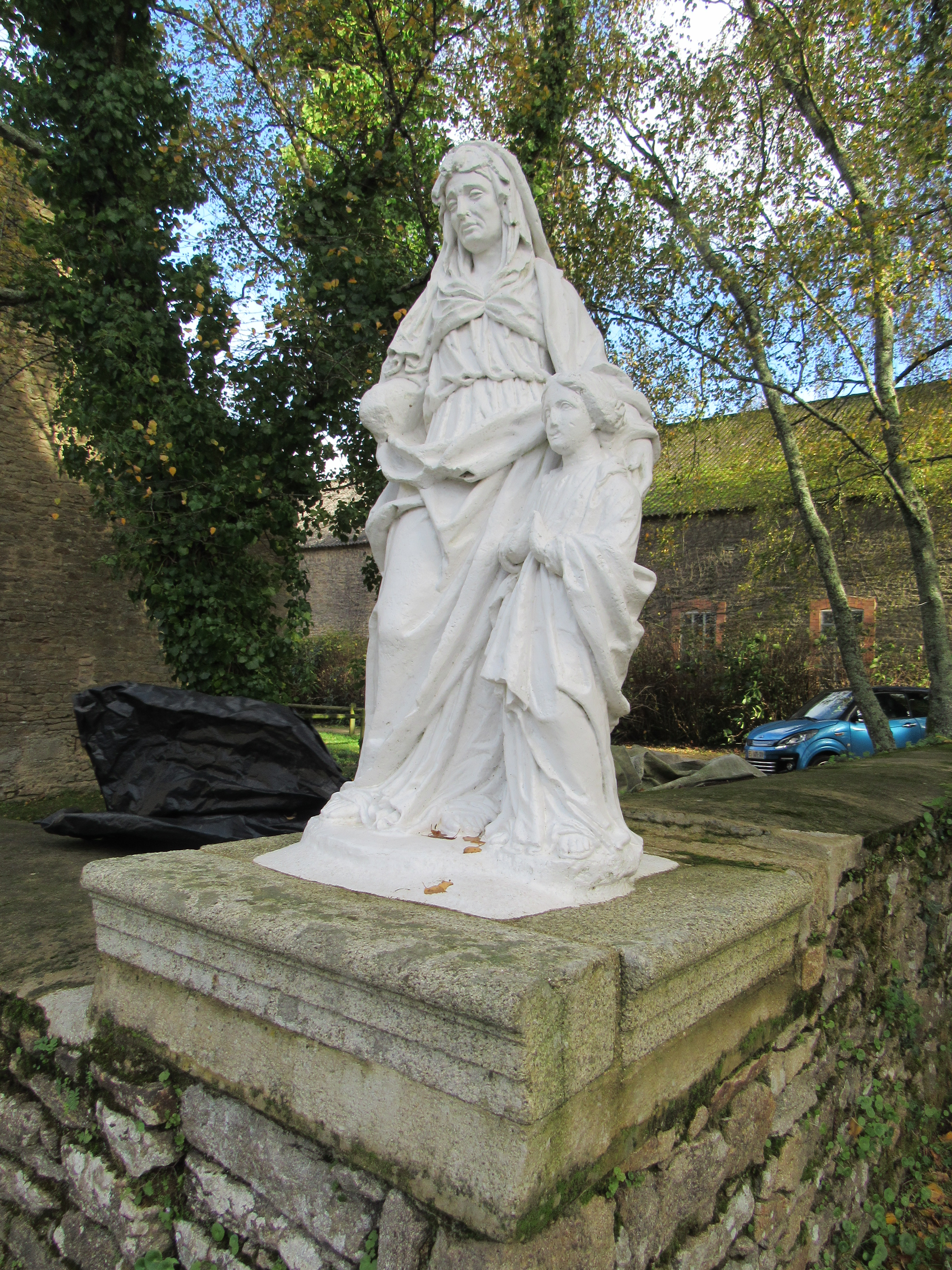
Sainte Anne, Sainte-Anne-d'Auray

Breton saints refers to both the innumerable people who lived, died, worked in, or came to be particularly venerated in the nine traditional dioceses of Brittany (Cornouaille, Dol, Léon, Nantes, Rennes, Saint-Brieuc, Saint-Malo, Tréguier, Vannes) who were accepted as saintly before the establishment of the Congregation of Rites (now the Congregation for the Causes of Saints), and those saints, blesseds, venerables, and Servants of God who have come to be recognized since that time.

== Armorican saints ==
Before the Bretons came, the land now known as Brittany was known as Armorica within the Roman province of Gallia Lugdunensis. The earliest saint associated with this region is Anne, mother of Mary (mother of Jesus), who purportedly appeared to Yves Nicolazic and spoke to him in Breton. Saint Anne is the patroness of Brittany.

After her, the earliest saints in what is now Brittany have dates which are sometimes unclear, but tradition holds they go back to the earliest days of the church. Maximinus, said to have been sent to preach among the Gauls, was made the first Bishop of Rennes. Pope Linus, the second Bishop of Rome, sent Clair and Adeodatus. Clair became the first Bishop of Nantes around AD 280 and died early in the third century; Adeodatus preached primarily in the area of Vannes. Other Armorican saints include Similien, the third Bishop of Nantes, who converted the brother-martyrs Donatian and Rogatian. Palladius may also have had an Armorican connection.

== The Seven Founders ==
The Bretons, coming from the British Isles, brought Christianity with them. With the coming of the Bretons, the seven ancient dioceses were established by the seven founding saints.

- Tudwal founded Tréguier
- Pol Aurelian founded Saint-Pol-de-Leon
- Brioc founded Saint-Brieuc
- Malo founded Saint-Malo
- Patern founded Vannes
- Corentin founded Cornouailles
- Samson founded Dol

The other two dioceses of Brittany were founded by Clair de Nantes and Maxime de Rennes.

== Medieval saints ==
=== Monarchs ===
- Darerca, Queen of Brittany
- Judicael, Breton king
- Salomon, King of Brittany

=== Bishops ===
- AEmilien, Bishop of Nantes
- Alain, 4th Bishop of Quimper
- Alori, Bishop of Quimper
- Amand, Bishop of Rennes
- Amandus, Bishop of Maastricht, born near Nantes
- Armand, 5th Bishop of Vannes
- Armel, 6th Bishop of Dol
- Aubin (or Albinus), Bishop of Angers (529–550), born near Vannes
- Bilius I, 16th Bishop of Vannes
- Bilius II, 33rd Bishop of Vannes (891–908)
- Budoc, 3rd Bishop of Dol
- Budoc, 12th Bishop of Vannes
- Catuodus, 15th Bishop of Vannes
- Clement, 3rd Bishop of Vannes
- Didier, Bishop of Rennes
- Dominius, 2nd Bishop of Vannes
- Enogat, 7th Bishop of Saint-Malo
- Felix, sixth century Bishop of Nantes
- Gaud, Bishop of Évreux
- Germanus of Man, first Bishop on the Isle of Man
- Genevee, 4th Bishop of Dol
- Gobrien,21st Bishop of Vannes (720–725)
- Goennoc, Bishop of Quimper
- Gouesnon, Bishop of Leon
- Goulven de Léon, Bishop of Leon
- Guenin, 10th Bishop of Vannes
- Hinguethen, 13th Bishop of Vannes
- Ignoroc (or Vigorocus), 11th Bishop of Vannes
- Jumael, 7th Bishop of Dol
- Justoc, 22nd Bishop of Vannes
- Magloire, 2nd Bishop of Dol
- Maelmon, Bishop of Aleth
- Melaine, Bishop of Rennes
- Meldroc, 17th Bishop of Vannes
- Meriasek, 14th Bishop of Vannes (650–666)
- Moran, Bishop of Rennes
- Oudoceus, Bishop of Llandaff
- Pasquier, 20th Bishop of Nantes
- Pergat, 3rd Bishop of Treguier
- Restoald, 5th Bishop of Dol
- Ruelin, 2nd Bishop of Treguier
- Saturnin, 6th Bishop of Vannes
- Tenenan, Bishop of Leon
- Turian, 8th Bishop of Dol

=== Others ===
- Aaron of Aleth
- Abran
- Alanus de Rupe
- Armel
- Arnoc
- Austol
- Baglan
- Benedict of Masserac
- Branwalator
- Briag
- Cadfan
- Cadoc
- Cadou
- Canna
- Cenydd
- Columba of Cornwall (not Breton, but patroness of a Breton village)
- Conwoïon
- Creirwy
- Edern
- Efflamm
- Elwen
- Felix of Rhuys
- Friard d'Indret
- Gildas the Wise
- Gildas the Albanian
- Gilduin, canon of Dol
- Goeznovius
- Goustan (or Sulstanus), lay brother, died c. 1009
- Guénolé
- Guirec
- Gurthiern
- Guyomard, martyr at Ploudery in 499
- Gwen Teirbron
- Gwenhael
- Gwinear
- Herbot
- Hermeland d'Indre
- Herve
- Illtud
- Jacut de Landoac
- Judoc
- Justinian of Ramsey Island
- Kea
- Lunaire
- Magloire
- Martin of Vertou
- Maudez
- Maurice, a Cistercian and first abbot of Carnoet (1117-1191)
- Mawgan
- Mechell
- Méen
- Melor
- Miliau
- Non
- Osmanna, seventh century Irish princess
- Rivoare
- Ronan of Locronan
- Sadwrn
- Secondel, companion of Friard d'Indret
- Senara
- Sithney
- Tanguy
- Tanwg
- Tecwyn
- Tremeur, sixth century martyr
- Trillo of Wales
- Twrog
- Tysilio or Suliac
- Tudy of Landevennec
- Urfol
- Urielle
- Vouga
- Viaud
- Victor of Cambon
- Winnoc
- Winwaloe
- Yben

== Modern saints ==
The "modern" in modern saints refers to the process, not the person, and groups those whose status has been recognized by Rome.

=== Saints ===
- Benedetto Menni, priest, canonized in 1999
- Gohard of Nantes, Bishop, canonized in 1096
- Louis de Montfort, priest, canonized in 1947
- Marie of the Cross (Jeanne Jugan), religious, canonized in 2009
- Mother Theodore, religious, canonized in 2006
- Vincent Ferrer, Dominican priest, canonized in 1455
- William Pinchon, Bishop, canonized in 1247
- Yves Helory, priest, canonized in 1347
- Of the One Hundred Twenty Martyrs of China
  - Marie of Saint Natalie (Jeanne-Marie Guerguin)
  - Marie of Saint Just (Anne-Françoise Moreau)

=== Blesseds (by beatification) ===
- Cassien of Nantes, Capuchin, beatified in 1905
- Charles of Blois, duke, beatified in 1904
- Julian Maunoir, Jesuit priest, beatified in 1951
- Marcel Callo, layman, beatified in 1987
- Mary of the Passion, religious, beatified in 2002
- Marie-Louise-Élisabeth de Lamoignon, religious, beatified in 2012
- Pierre-Rene Rouge, Vincentian priest, beatified in 1934
- Of the Twenty Martyrs of Capuchin Tertiary Fathers and Brothers of Our Lady of Sorrows in Spain, beatified in 2001
  - Carmen Marie Anne Garcia Moyon
- Of the Fifteen Martyrs of the Daughters of Charity of Saint Vincent de Paul and the Ursulines of Valenciennes (of the Martyrs of the French Revolution, beatified in 1920
  - Therese-Madeleine Fantou
- Of the One Hundred Ninety-One Martyrs of the September Massacres, beatified in 1926
  - Charles-Francois le Gue
  - Claude-Antoine-Raoul Laporte
  - Francois-Hyacinth le Livec de Tresurin
  - Henri-August Luzeau de la Mulonniere
  - Jean-Charles-Marie Bernard du Cornillet
  - Joseph Becavin
  - Louis-Laurent Gaultier
  - Mathurin-Nicolas de la Villecrohain le Bous de Villeneuve
  - Nicolas-Marie Verron
  - Rene-Joseph Urvoy
  - Rene-Julien Massey
  - Rene-Marie Andrieux
  - Vincent-Joseph le Rousseau de Rosencoat
  - Yves-Andre Guillon de Keranrun
  - Yves-Jean-Pierre Rey de Kervisic
- Of the Fifteen Martyrs of Laos
  - Jean-Baptiste Malo
  - Joseph Boissel
  - Vincent L'Henoret
- Of the Nineteen Martyrs of Algeria
  - Alain Dieulangard
  - Celestin Ringeard
  - Michel Fleury

=== Blesseds (by confirmation of cult) ===
- David, cult confirmed in 1120
- Françoise d'Amboise, cult confirmed 1863
- John of the Grating, Cistercian Bishop, cult confirmed in 1517
- Yann Divotou, Franciscan priest, cult confirmed in 1989
- Ralph de la Futaye, unclear when cult confirmed

=== Venerables ===
- Alain-Marie Guynot de Boismenu, religious Bishop, proclaimed in 2014
- Jean-Marie Robert de la Mennais, religious priest, proclaimed in 1966
- Marie-Amelie Fristel, religious, proclaimed in 1976
- Michel le Nobletz, priest, proclaimed in 1915

=== Servants of God ===
- Louis-Marie Leveil
- Louis de Goesbriand
- Alano Maria du Noday
- Catherine de Francheville
- Claude-Francois Poullart des Places
- Francois-Marie-Benjamin Richard de la Vergne
- Jacques Cathelineau
- Jean of Saint Samson
- Marie-Yvonne-Aimee of Jesus
- Pauline-Louise Pinczon du Sel
- Pierre Quintin
- Pierre-Joseph Picot de Cloriviere
- Robert of Arbrissel
- Simon Brute
- Victor Lelievre
- Yves Nicolazic (Ivon Nikolazig in Breton)
- Of the Fifty Martyrs of France of the Apostolate Within the Service du Travail Obligatoire
  - Eugene Lemoine
  - Maurice-Philippe Bouchard
  - Roger (Paul) le Ber
- Of the Thirty-Eight Martyrs of the Revolutionary Tribunal of Paris
  - Francois-Georges Cormaux
  - Therese Guillaudeu du Plessis
  - Victoire Conen de Saint-Luc
- The Eighty-Five Martyrs of Rennes of the French Revolution

== Other saintly Bretons ==
- Corentin Cloarec, killed by the Nazis
- Joachim Nio, killed by the Gestapo

== See also ==
- List of Welsh saints, many of whom shared Breton connections.
- List of saints of the Canary Islands

== Sources ==
- "Hagiography Circle"
- M. de Garaby, Vie des bienheureux et des saints de Bretagne, éd. J.-M. Williamson, Nantes, 1839. Réédition 1991.
- P.T. de S. Luc, C. L'Histoire de Conan Mériadec Qui Fait le Premier regne de l'histoire generale des souverains de la Bretagne Gauloise, dite Armorique. Paris, 1664.
