= Saint Ténénan =

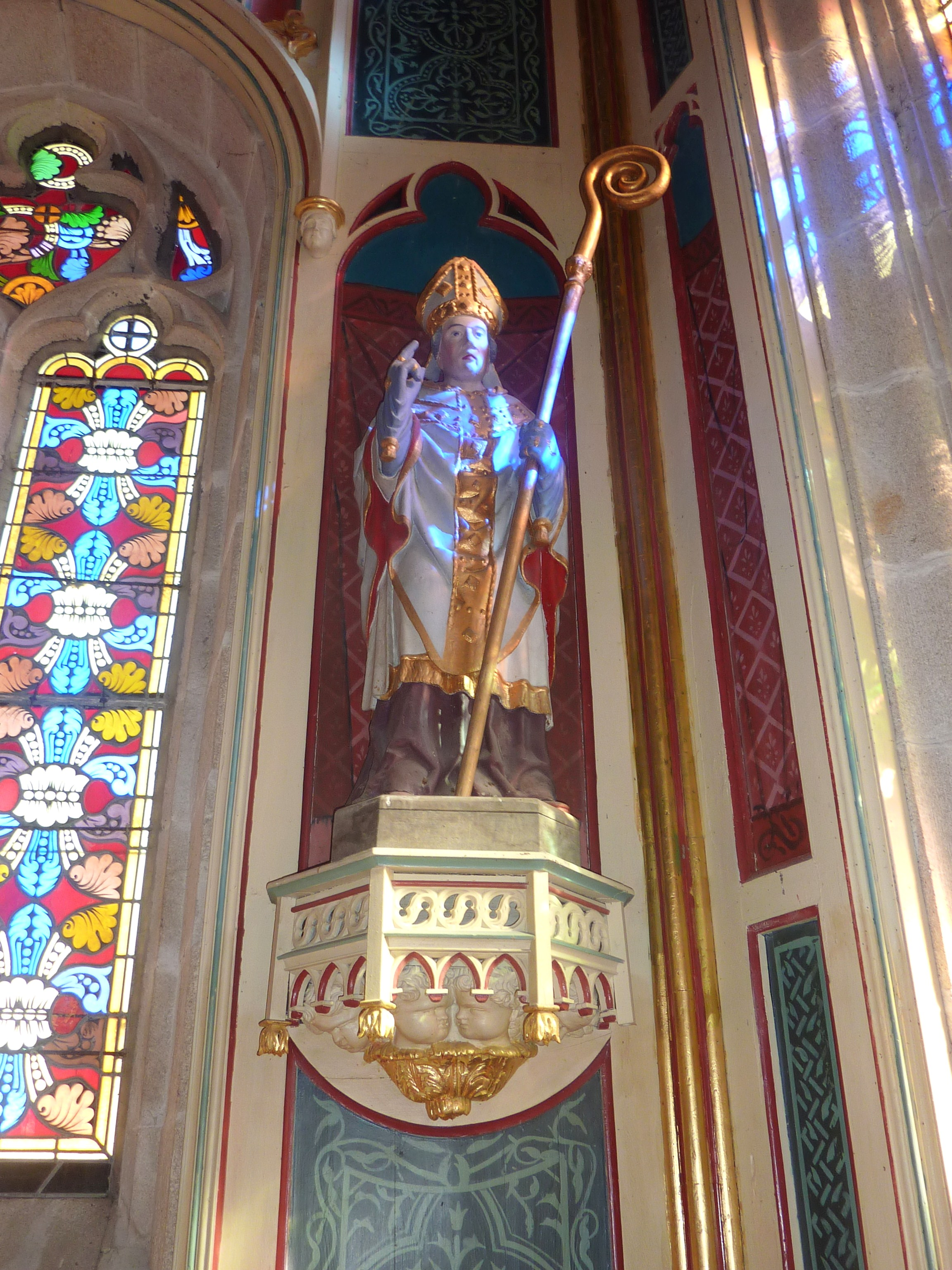
Statue de Saint Ténénan

Saint Ténénan (or Saint Thénénan) is one of the mythical Breton saints of Armorica. He is known as Tudogilus (or Saint Tudon or Saint Thudon), as the father of Saint Gouesnou, Saint Majan and a girl named Tudona. Records suggest Saint Ténénan and Saint Tudon immigrated to Brittany at the same time, frequented the same places and therefore may be one individual.

== Early life ==
The life of Ténénan is so poorly known that Albert Le Grand wrote that at least three saints may have been confused: the first, of Irish origin (Hibernia at the time) lived in the fifth century as a contemporary of Saint Patrick, the patron saint of Ireland; the second "Ténénan-Tinidor"; and a third who lived at the time of the Norman invasions.

Ténénan or Tinidor was born in Wales; he was at first a brilliant young man attending the noble courts. According to Albert Le Grand, he was the son of Tinidor (whose name is wrongly attributed to him) and the nephew of Saint Jaoua.

As a teenager, he was so handsome that the Countess d'Arondel's daughter wanted him for her husband. Desiring to flee worldliness and having decided "to keep his virginity, he prayed, begging the Divine Majesty to make him so ugly and so deformed that no one would want him any more, promising, in return, to keep perpetual chastity, if God did him this favor. It was granted, and in a moment the whole surface of his body was covered with leprosy, so that he horrified all who looked upon him."

== Career ==
Ténénan entered the monastery directed by Saint Carantec in Hibernia (present-day Ireland); the latter cured him of leprosy by plunging him into a bath, "his skin became clear and white like that of a little child," and sent him to preach in Armorica.

An angel appeared to him, telling him to go to the flock that Saint Paul Aurelian had shepherded. Coming from overseas, Ténénan came to Leon by the Goulet and the Élorn. After disembarking at Joyeuse-Garde, he built his hermitage in the forest at Lan-Tinidor (not far from Landerneau). Then, penetrating further into the forest, he settled near Gallo-Roman ruins at Plabennec.

In 615, on the death of Saint Goulven, bishop of Leon, Tenenan was elected to replace him and deputies went to Ploubennec to bring him the news. Tenenan answered them "that he felt his shoulders too weak to bear a burden so heavy," but yielding to their petitions, finally accepted. He was consecrated bishop in the cathedral of Dol by Saint Guennou.

After serving as bishop of Leon, Ténénan returned to Plabennec, where he died around 650. He was buried in his cathedral. According to Dom Lobineau, only one relic of the saint remained in the early eighteenth century, in the church of Trégarantec, under the name of St. Ternoc.

Saint Ténénan is sometimes confused with Saint Arnoc and some historians believe that he is in fact the same saint.

== Legacy ==
A single parish undoubtedly bears the name of Saint-Ténénan according to the old form: Saint-Thonan; but the church is today dedicated to Saint Nicolas.

Saint Ténénan is the patron saint of Guerlesquin, La Forest-Landerneau and Plabennec where his relics were once located. There used to be a kind of tromenie of Saint Ténénan in Plabennec, and whose starting point was, until its ruin, the Saint-Ténan chapel in Lez-Kélen.

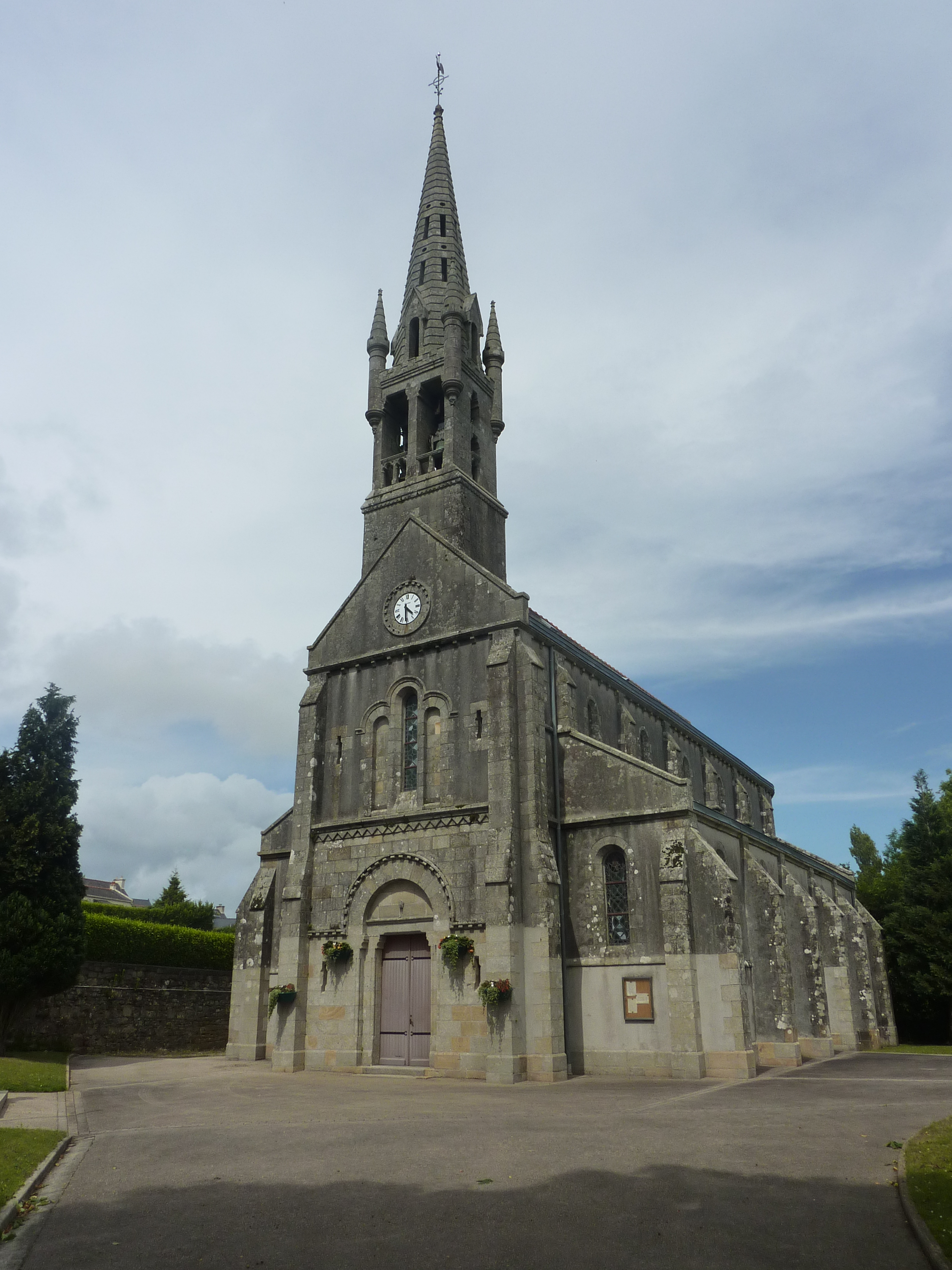
l'église de Saint-Ténénan, La Forest-Landerneau

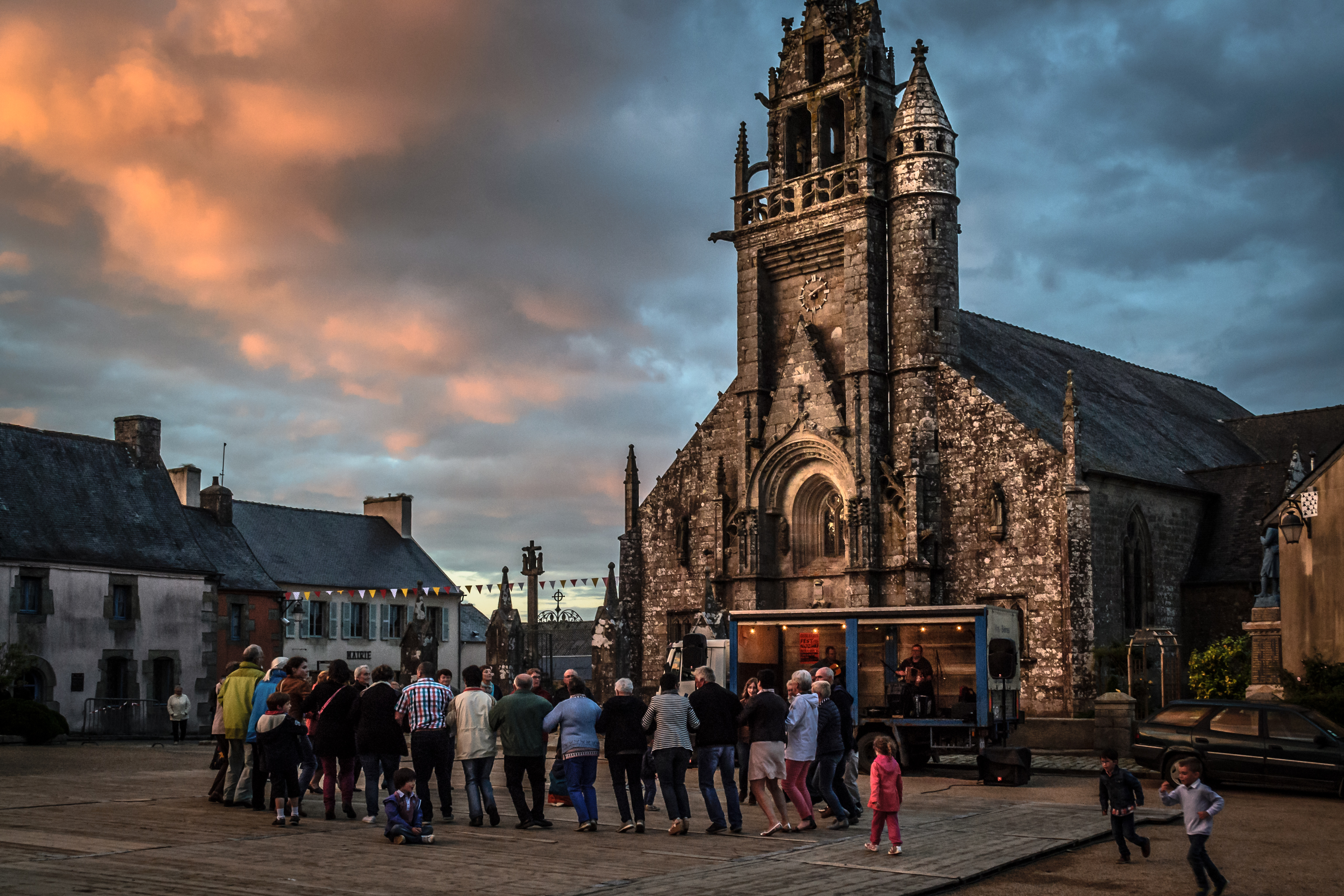
Église Saint-Ténénan de Guerlesquin

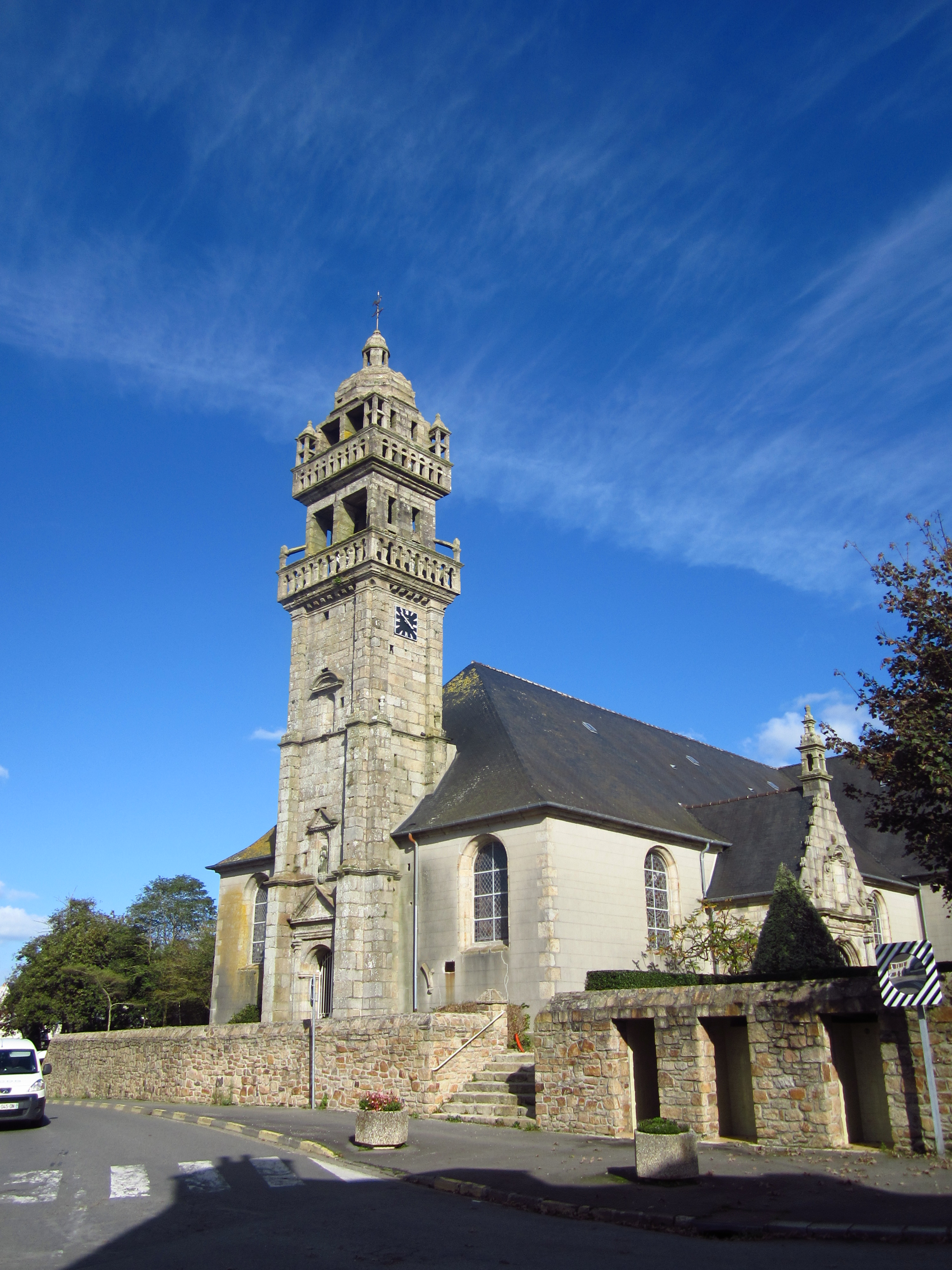
Église Saint-Ténénan à Plabennec

== Sources ==
- Vita S. Tenenani, cited in : Albert Le Grand, Les vies des saints de la Bretagne Armorique : ensemble un ample catalogue chronologique et historique des evesques d'icelle... et le catalogue de la pluspart des abbés, blazons de leurs armes et autres curieuses recherches... (5e éd.), J.Salaün, Quimper
