= Urfol =

Saint Urfol (also known as Saint Urfold, Saint Urphoed or Saint Wulphroëdus) is a Breton saint from Armorica. His Feast Day is September 17.

Urfol was born at the manor of Lannriou in Landouzan in the parish of Le Drennec at the beginning of the 6th century and would have received his religious training at the monastery of Ac'h (or Ack). He was the brother of Saints Rivanone and Rivoare. via his relation to Rivanone, Urfol was also the uncle of Saint Herve. Urfol lived as a hermit in the forest of Dunan (Duna in Breton means "deep"), which extended from Saint-Renan to Plouvien, probably on the site of the current town of Bourg-Blanc, probably at location of the chapel Saint-Urfold, living apart from society and his family in a state of penance and contemplation. According to Albert Le Grand, he was a "character of rare holiness and doctrine which lived in a small monastery in the Archdeaconry of Ac'h".

His nephew, Saint Herve, had by revelation knowledge of the death of Saint Urfol and set out for his uncle's oratory. He prostrated himself to pray, and during his prayer the ground trembled so much that all who were with him were thrown to the ground; the earth opened, and from this opening came a sweet and odoriferous odor. Saint Hervé, having, by this miracle, known and found the tomb of his uncle, the place became the setting for miracles.

== Bibliography ==
- Albert le Grand, Les vies des saints de la Bretagne Armorique : ensemble un ample catalogue chronologique et historique des evesques d'icelle... et le catalogue de la pluspart des abbés, blazons de leurs armes et autres curieuses recherches..., 5e édition, 1901, revue et corrigée par Guy Autret
