= Ethbin =

6th-century Breton saint

Yben
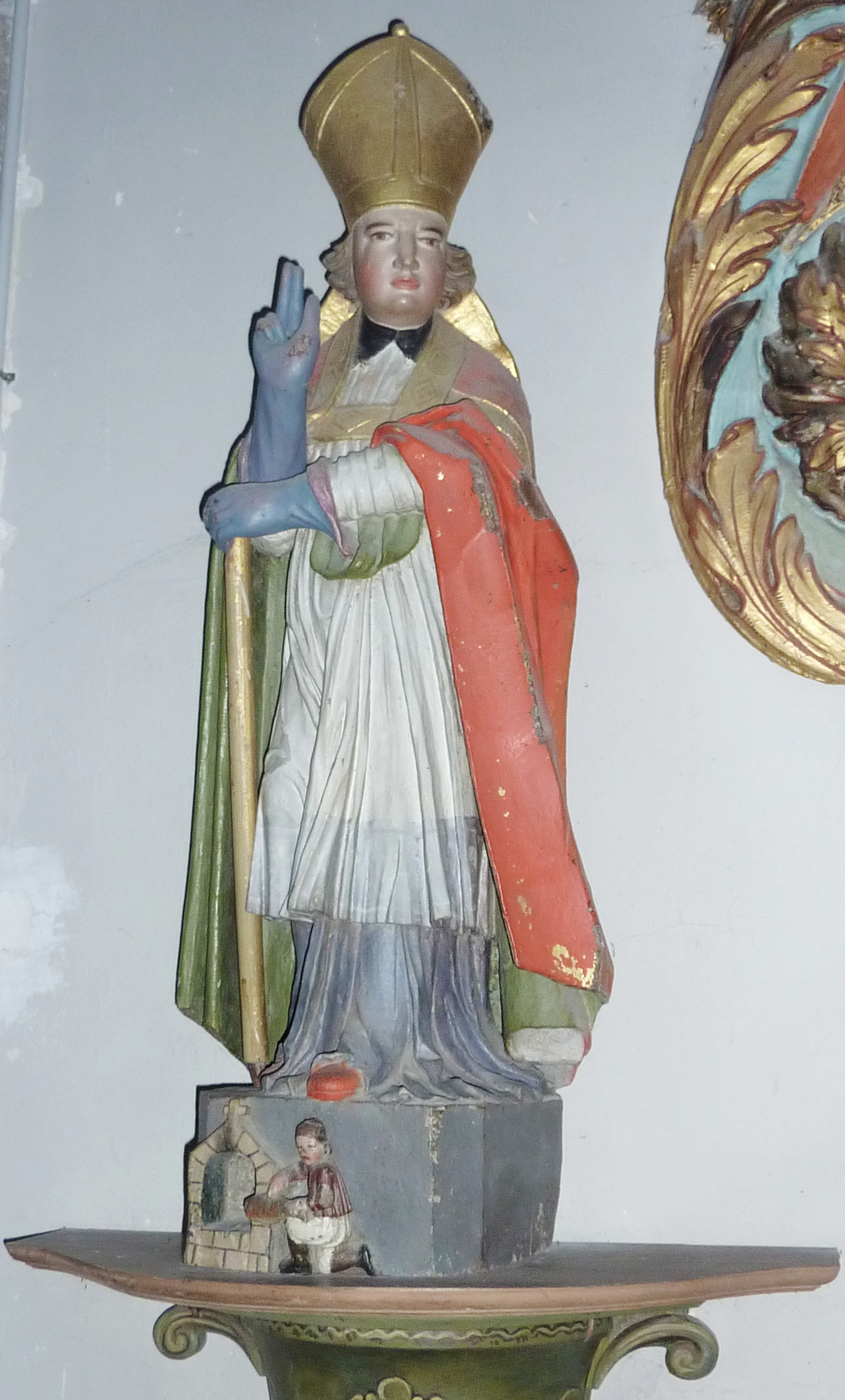
- Born: sixth century Armorica
- Died: c. 600; Ireland
- Venerated in: Roman Catholic Church
- Feast: 19 October

Saint Yban, also known as Saint Ethbin, saint Iboan, saint Diboan, saint Diboen, saint Iben, saint Ibe, saint Abibon, saint Languis, saint Langui, saint Idunet, saint Ivinec, is one of a number of semi-legendary Breton saints from Armorica who are recognized by the Catholic Church. He was a disciple of Saint Winwaloe. He founded a priory which is today the city of Châteaulin.

The local church remembers him as a deacon. He was invoked for a good apple crop, and offerings of cider were made to him. After his monastery at Taurac was destroyed by the Franks he went to live in seclusion in the woods, first in Brittany and later in Ireland. He died on 14 November aged 83.

== Bibliography ==
- Albert le Grand, Les vies des saints de la Bretagne Armorique : ensemble un ample catalogue chronologique et historique des evesques d'icelle... et le catalogue de la pluspart des abbés, blazons de leurs armes et autres curieuses recherches..., 5e édition, 1901, revue et corrigée par Guy Autret. "La vie de Saint Ethbin" Pages 510-513. books.google.com/books?id=vycJoXdW_RIC&pg=PA510
- Sylvette Denefle, Hagiographie sans texte : le culte de saint Diboan en Cornouaille armoricaine, in « Les Saints et les stars : le texte hagiographique dans la culture populaire » par Jean Claude Schmitt, Éditions Beauchesne, 1983, p. 135-143
- Butler, Albin. The Lives of the Fathers, Martyrs, and Other Principal Saints, Volume 10. Pages 418-419. books.google.com/books?id=_JJjAAAAMAAJ&lpg=PA418
