= Rivoare =

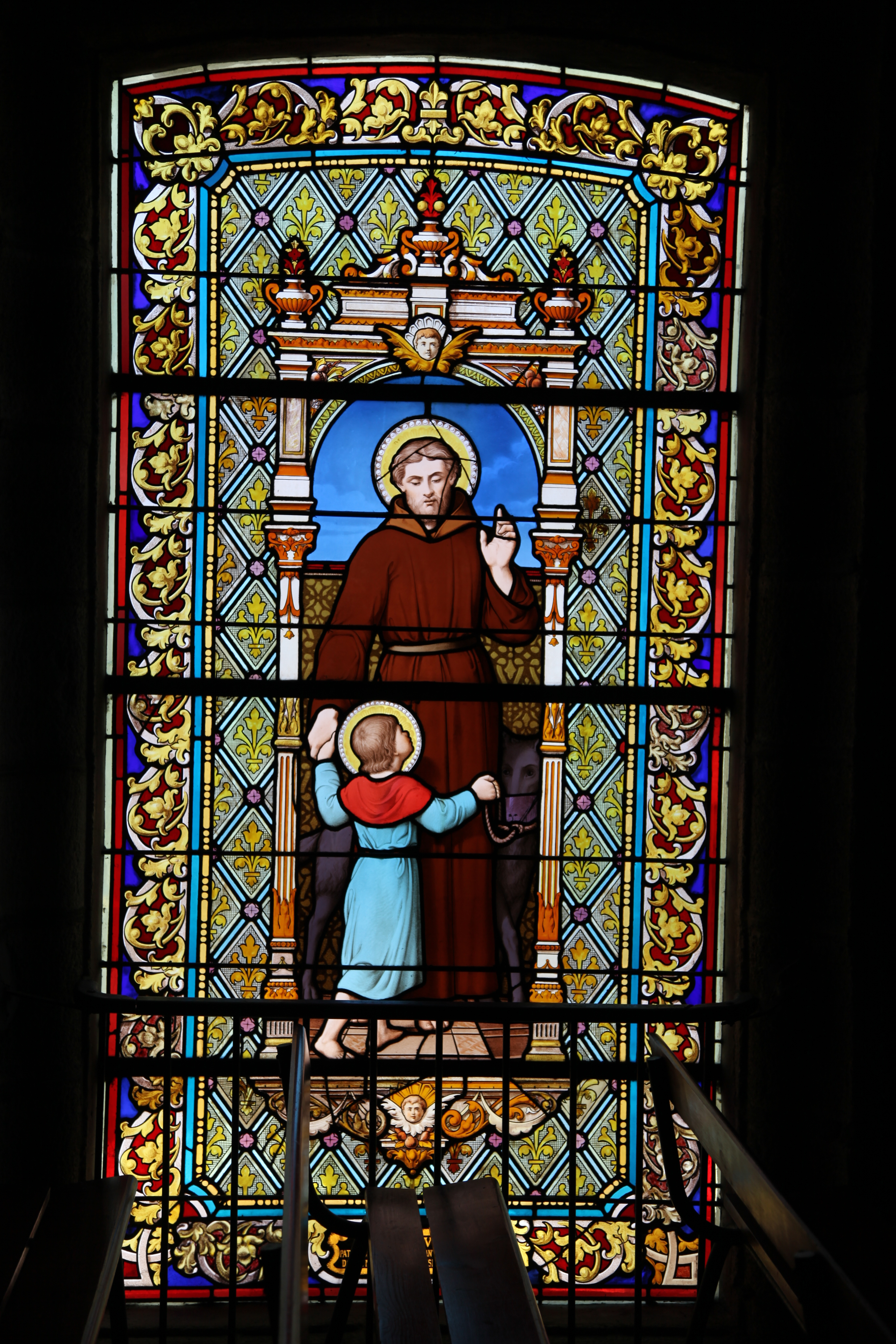
- Born: fifth century
- Died: sixth century
- Venerated in: Roman Catholic Church
- Feast: 19 September

Saint Rivoare, also known as Saint Riware, Saint Riwall, Riware, Rivoal, Rioual or Rivoaré, is one of a number of semi-legendary Breton saints from Armorica. His feast is 19 September.

He was a sixth-century priest, uncle to Saint Herve. Rivoare is called "the first emigrant priest on the continent". The Latin term which designates it -- "antistes" -- implies an ecclesiastic power. Only after his arrival in Armorica would monasteries and bishoprics be established. The previous bishops or abbots who evangelized the region were often designated as itinerant, coming from the British Isles without being fixed on the continent.

== Sources ==
- Albert le Grand, Les vies des saints de la Bretagne Armorique : ensemble un ample catalogue chronologique et historique des evesques d'icelle... et le catalogue de la pluspart des abbés, blazons de leurs armes et autres curieuses recherches..., 5e édition, 1901, revue et corrigée par Guy Autret.
