= July 16 (Eastern Orthodox liturgics) =

Day in the Eastern Orthodox liturgical calendar

Eastern Orthodox liturgical calendar
| July 15 | July 16 | July 17 |
July 16 O.S. ≍ July 29 N.S. July 16 N.S ≍ July 3 O.S.

An Eastern Orthodox cross

July 16 in Eastern Orthodox liturgical calendars is a feast day and a day of commemoration of saints and martyrs. Although some Orthodox churches use the Revised Julian Calendar and others use the traditional Julian calendar, the fixed commemorations for their respective July 16 are broadly the same, no matter which calendar is used. (Note: Despite the dates being the same, the days to which they refer typically differ by 13 days. The notation Old Style or O.S. is sometimes used to indicate a date in the traditional Julian Calendar (the "Old Calendar"). The notation New Style or N.S. indicates a date in the Revised Julian calendar (the "New Calendar").)

== Saints ==
- Saint Kyriakos the Executioner (Cyriacus), who had beheaded the martyr Antiochus of Sulcis, then converted to Christ and was beheaded (c. 110) (see also: December 13)
- Martyr Faustus, by crucifixion, under Decius (c. 249-251) (Note: "The same day, the birthday of St. Faustus, a martyr, under Decius. He lived five days fastened on a cross, and being then pierced with arrows, he went to heaven.")
- Martyrs Paul and his two sisters Chionia (Thea) and Alevtina (Valentina) at Caesarea Palaestina (308) (see also: July 18)
- Hieromartyr Athenogenes, Bishop of Heracleopolis, and his ten disciples (c. 311) (Note: "At Sebaste, in Armenia, the holy martyrs Athenogenes, bishop, and ten of his disciples, in the time of the emperor Diocletian.") (Note: The ten disciples are: (in Greek) Ριγίνος, Μαξιμίνος, Πατρόφιλος, Ἀθηνογένης, Ἀντίοχος, Ἄμμων, Θεόφραστος, Κλεόνικος, Πέτρος καὶ Ἠσύχιος.)

- Martyr Athenogenes, by fire.

- Martyr Antiochus of Sebaste, Physician (4th century)
- 15,000 Martyrs of Pisidia, who believed in Christ through Saint Marina, by the sword.
- Many Holy Women Martyred by the sword.
- Saint Anastasius I, Bishop of Thessaloniki, a father of the Fourth Ecumenical Council (via his representative) (451)
- Saint Auxitheus (or Eudoxius), Bishop of Thessaloniki, one of the great Fathers of the Fourth Ecumenical Council (458)

== Pre-Schism Western saints ==
- Saint Domnio, a martyr in Bergamo in Italy under Diocletian (c. 295) (Note: "At Bergamo, St. Domnio, martyr.")
- Saint Valentine of Trier, Bishop of Trier in Germany (or more probably Tongres in Belgium), under Diocletian (c. 305) (Note: "At Treves, St. Valentine, bishop and martyr.")
- Virgin-martyr Julia of Carthage, by crucifixion, at Corsica (c. 440) (Note: Born in Carthage in North Africa, she was sold into slavery by the Vandal conquerors. The ship on which she was being taken to Gaul stopped in Corsica. At that time heathen festival was being celebrated and when Julia refused to join in, she was immediately martyred by being nailed to a cross. She is the patroness-saint of Corsica.)
- Martyr Helier of Jersey (6th century) (Note: Born in Tongres in Belgium, he lived as a hermit on Jersey in the Channel Islands and was martyred by heathen whom he was trying to convert.)
- Saint Reineldis (Raineldis, Reinaldes) and Companions, martyred by the Huns (c. 680) (Note: Daughter of St Amelberg and sister of St Gudula. She was a nun at Saintes in Belgium where she was martyred together with two companions by the Huns.) (Note: "At Saintes, in France, the holy martyrs Raineldes, virgin, and her companions, who were massacred by barbarians for the Christian faith.")
- Saint Generosus, Abbot of Saint-Jouin-de-Marnes in Poitou in France (c. 682)
- Saint Ténénan, Bishop of Léon (7th century) (Note: Probably born in Wales, he became a hermit in Brittany and eventually Bishop of Léon. His relics were enshrined in Ploabennec.)
- Saint Vitalian of Capua, Bishop of Capua in Italy (7th century) (Note: "At Capua, St. Vitalian, bishop and confessor.")
- Saint Vitalian of Osimo, Bishop of Osimo in Italy (776)
- Martyr Sisenandus Córdoba, a Deacon in the church of St Acisclus in Córdoba in Spain, beheaded under Abderrahman II (851) (Note: "At Cordova, in Spain, St. Sisenandus, deacon and martyr, who was strangled by the Saracens for the faith of Christ.")
- Saint Irmengard (Irmgard of Chiemsee), Abbess of Buchau and then of Chiemsee in Germany (866)

== Post-Schism Orthodox saints ==
- Saint John of Vishnya and Mt. Athos, activist against Uniatism (c. 1630)
- New Martyr John of Turnovo (1822)
- Saint Theodotus, monk of Glinsk Hermitage (1859)

=== New martyrs and confessors ===
- New Hieromartyrs Nicholas of Tarsus (1917) and his son Habib of Damascus (1948)
- New Hieromartyrs Seraphim, Theognostus, and others of Alma-Ata (1921)
- Venerable Schema-Abbess Magdalena (Dosmanova) of New Tikhvin Convent in Siberia (1934)
- New Confessor Matrona Belyakova, Fool-for-Christ, of Anemnyasevo (1936) (Note: See: (in Russian) Матрона Анемнясевская. Википедии. (Russian Wikipedia).)
- New Hieromartyrs Jacob (Maskaev), Archbishop of Barnaul, (Note: See: (in Russian) Иаков (Маскаев). Википедии. (Russian Wikipedia).) and Priests Peter Gavrilov and John Mozhirin, and with them Monk-martyr Theodore (Nikitin) and Martyr John (1937)
- New Hieromartyr Ardalion (Ponamarev), Archimandrite, of Kasli (Chelyabinsk) (1938)

== Other commemorations ==
- Icon of the Mother of God of Chirsk-Pskov (1420)

== Icon gallery ==
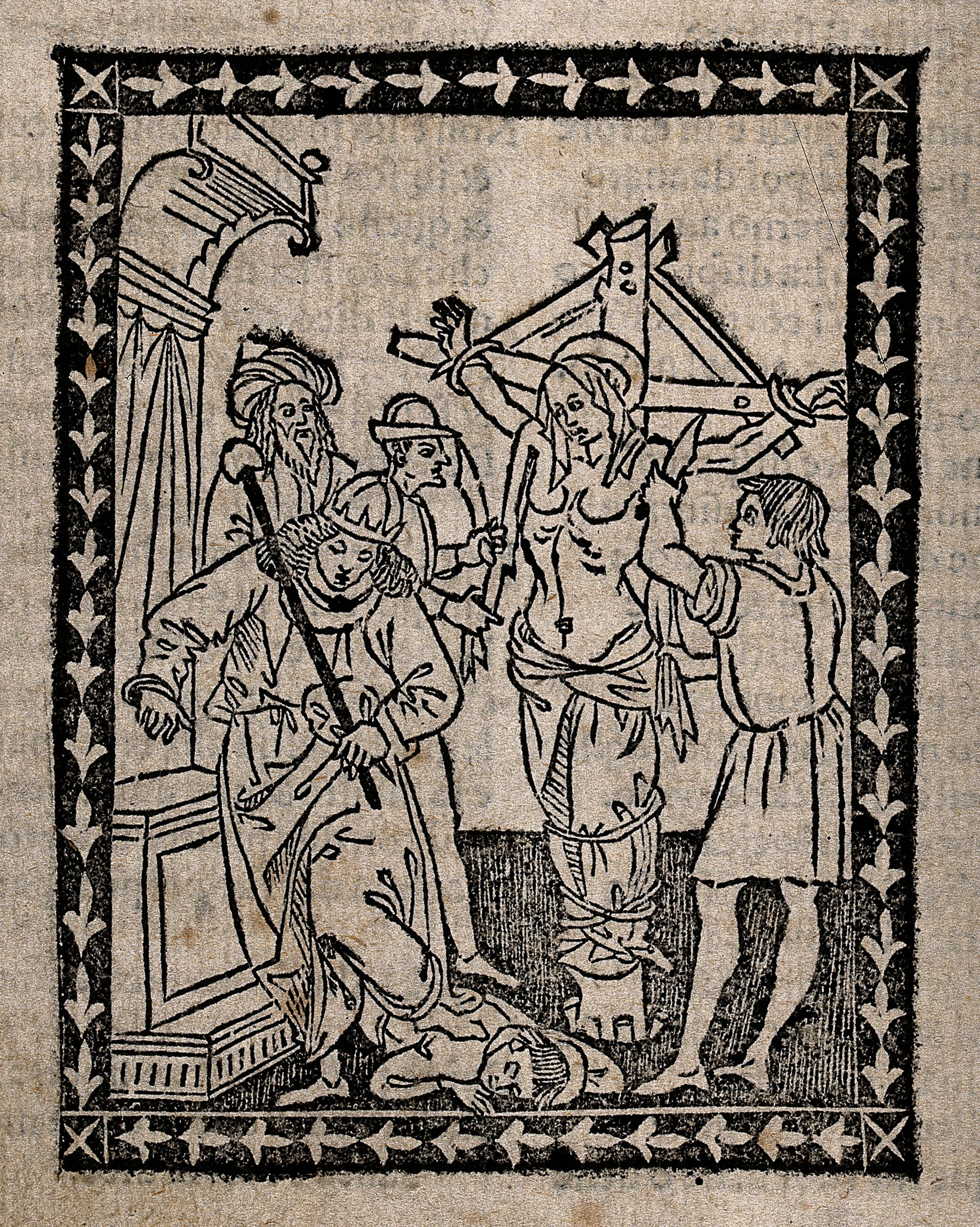
Virgin-martyr Julia of Carthage.

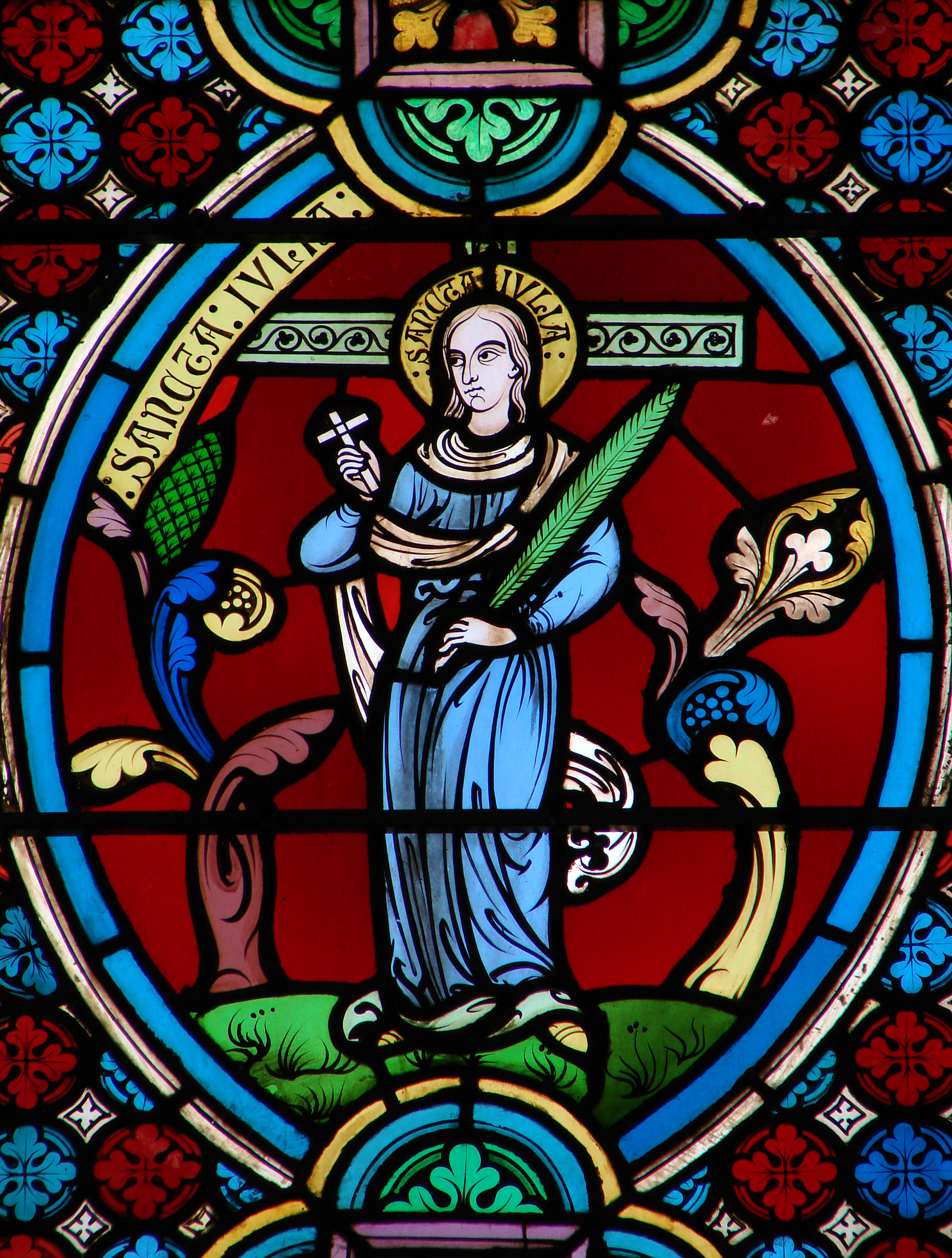
Virgin-martyr Julia of Carthage.

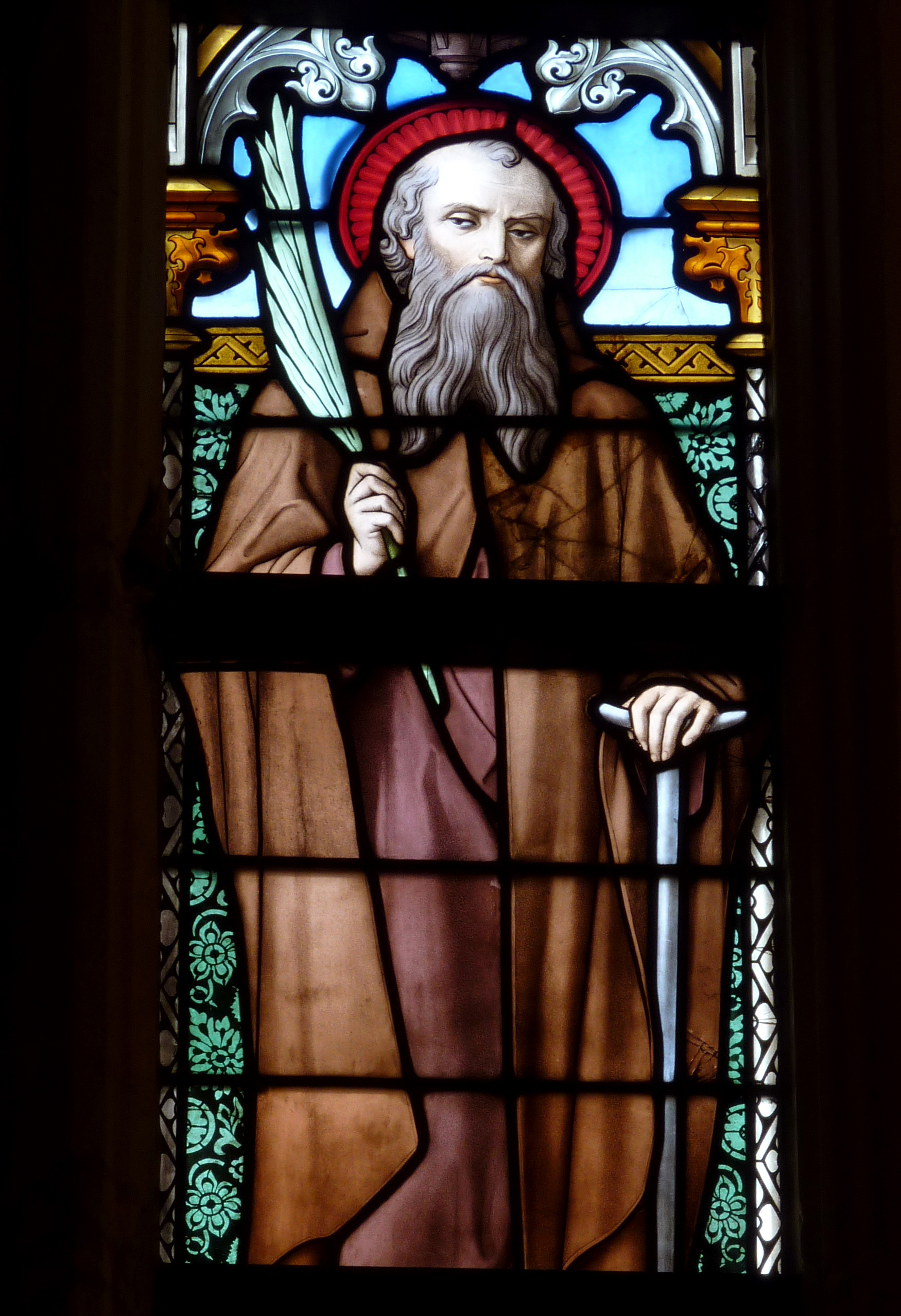
St. Helier of Jersey.

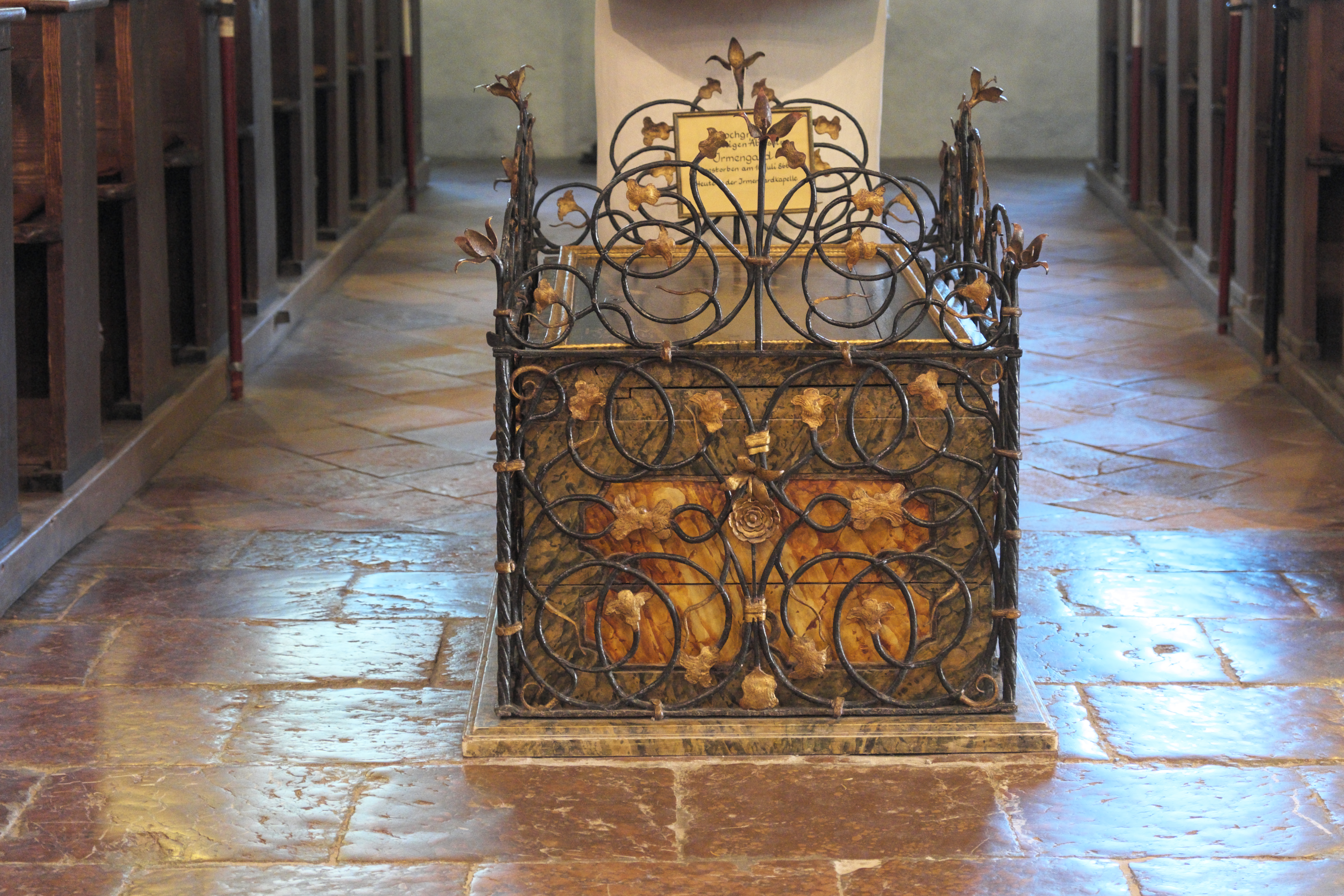
Reliquary of St. Irmengard of Chiemsee.

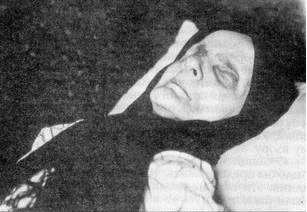
New Confessor Matrona Belyakova, Fool-for-Christ, of Anemnyasevo.

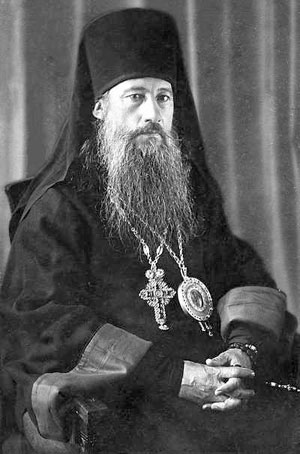
New Hieromartyr Jacob (Maskaev), Archbishop of Barnaul.

== Sources ==
- July 16/July 29. Orthodox Calendar (PRAVOSLAVIE.RU).
- July 29 / July 16. HOLY TRINITY RUSSIAN ORTHODOX CHURCH (A parish of the Patriarchate of Moscow).
- July 16. OCA - The Lives of the Saints.
- July 16. The Year of Our Salvation - Holy Transfiguration Monastery, Brookline, Massachusetts.
- The Autonomous Orthodox Metropolia of Western Europe and the Americas (ROCOR). St. Hilarion Calendar of Saints for the year of our Lord 2004. St. Hilarion Press (Austin, TX). p. 52.
- The Sixteenth Day of the Month of July. Orthodoxy in China.
- July 16. Latin Saints of the Orthodox Patriarchate of Rome.
- The Roman Martyrology. Transl. by the Archbishop of Baltimore. Last Edition, According to the Copy Printed at Rome in 1914. Revised Edition, with the Imprimatur of His Eminence Cardinal Gibbons. Baltimore: John Murphy Company, 1916. p. 209.
- Rev. Richard Stanton. A Menology of England and Wales, or, Brief Memorials of the Ancient British and English Saints Arranged According to the Calendar, Together with the Martyrs of the 16th and 17th Centuries. London: Burns & Oates, 1892. pp. 341–344.

Greek Sources

- Great Synaxaristes: (in Greek) 16 ΙΟΥΛΙΟΥ. ΜΕΓΑΣ ΣΥΝΑΞΑΡΙΣΤΗΣ.
- (in Greek) Συναξαριστής. 16 Ιουλίου. ECCLESIA.GR. (H ΕΚΚΛΗΣΙΑ ΤΗΣ ΕΛΛΑΔΟΣ).
- (in Greek) 16/07/2026. Ορθόδοξος Συναξαριστής.

Russian Sources

- (in Russian) 29 июля (16 июля). Православная Энциклопедия под редакцией Патриарха Московского и всея Руси Кирилла (электронная версия). (Orthodox Encyclopedia - Pravenc.ru).
- (in Russian) 16 июля по старому стилю / 29 июля по новому стилю. СПЖ "Союз православных журналистов". 2026.
- (in Russian) 16 июля (ст.ст.) 29 июля 2026 (нов. ст.). Русская Православная Церковь Отдел внешних церковных связей. (DECR).
