= Arnoc =

Breton saint from early Armorica

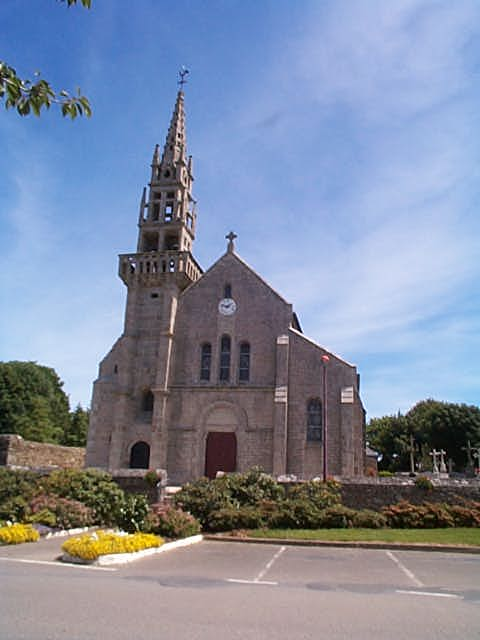
Eglise Saint-Théarnec, Finistère

Saint Arnoc or Ernoc or Arnec or Théarnec or Thernoc or Ternoc was a Breton saint from early Armorica. He is the patron of the parish of Trégarantec in Finistère.

== Biography ==
Arnoc was the son of Saint Judicael and Queen Morone. He embraced religious life under Saint Judoc, his uncle, with whom he lived for some time on the banks of the Canche in Ponthieu. Upon Judoc's death, Arnoc and another nephew, Winoc, inherited his hermitage, which later became the monastery of Saint Josse-sur-mer.

Arnoc returned to Leon, where he built on the banks of the Élorn a cell and a chapel which became famous under the name of Land-Ernoc, a name which has been preserved in the present city of Landerneau. Later, Arnoc became bishop in the canton of Illy. His bishopric contained only twenty households. During his episcopate, he built two churches in the parish of Ploudaniel and dedicated them to the two best friends of his father, one to Saint Méen, the other to Saint Eloi. Near him lived a holy hermit named Guenion, Guinien, or Vinien, who was the brother of Judicael, and to whom Arnoc ceded his bishopric. Guinien is the patron saint of Pleudaniel. The former little diocese of Illy was in the parish of Trégarantec, in the Lysien section, and contained seventeen villages. Arnoc is the patron of Trégarantec.

The parish church of Saint-Théarnec in Trégarantec preserves a relic of "Saint Ernoc".

== Source ==
- Albert le Grand Les vies des saints de la Bretagne Armorique: ensemble un ample catalogue chronologique et historique des evesques d'icelle... et le catalogue de la pluspart des abbés, blazons de leurs armes et autres curieuses recherches..., 5e édition, 1901, revue et corrigée par Guy Autret, pages 312-313.
