= Pergat =

Saint Pergat or Pergad or Pergobat or Bergat was a sixth-century Brenton bishop contemporary with Saint Ruelin. He is regarded as a saint in local Brenton calendars: His feast day is August 1st or August 3rd.

== Biography ==
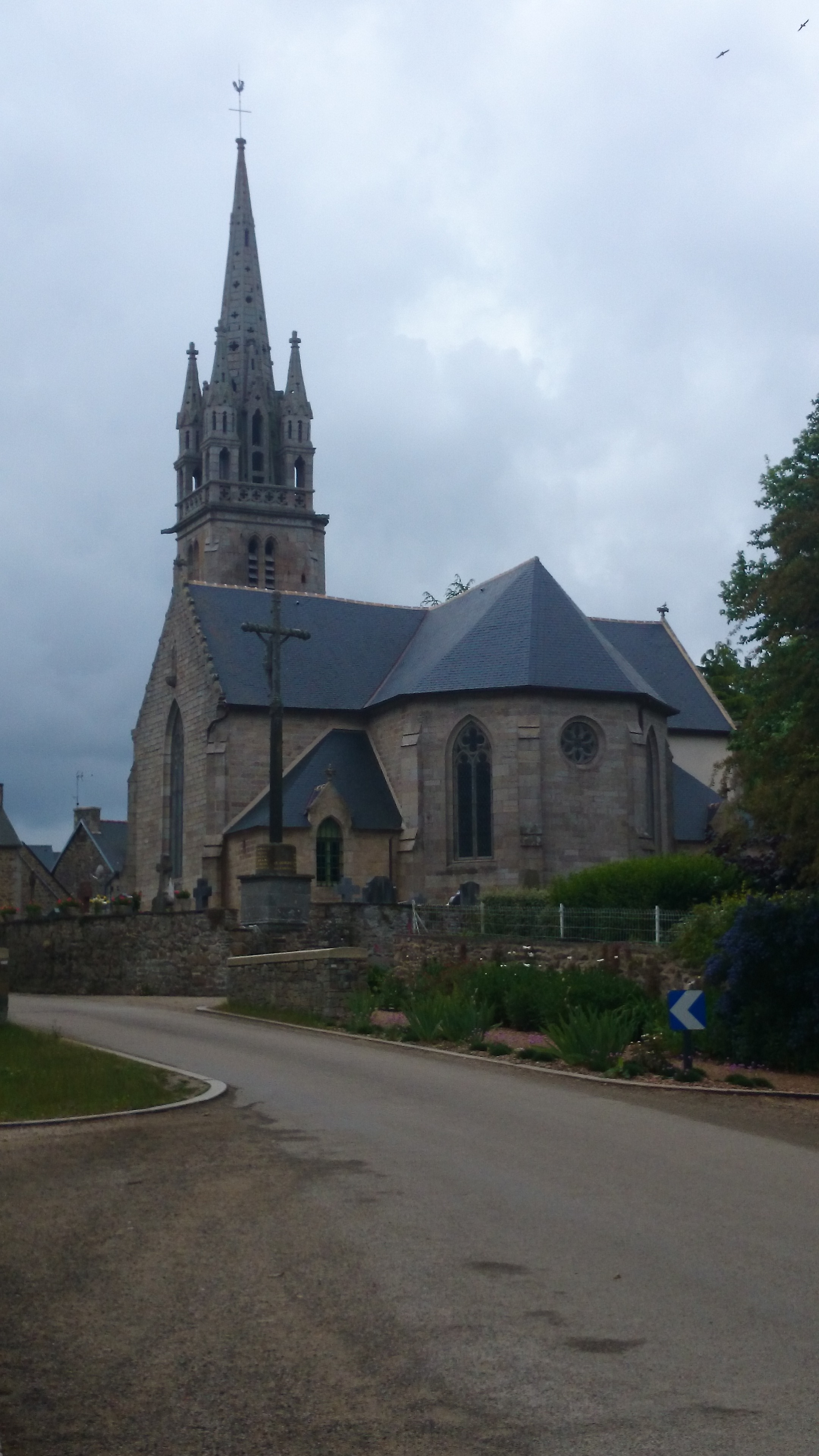
Église Saint-Bergat de Pouldouran

Pergat was born into a noble and wealthy family around 548. He was a student of the Breton monk Tugdual who established a hermitage on an island off the coast of North Wales. Pergat accompanied Tugdual when the latter returned to Brittany, probably settling at Yaudet near Lannion.

A good speaker, Pergat became Canon and Archdeacon of Tréguier. On the death of Tugdual, he contested the election of bishop Ruelin and, supported by a part of the people and clergy, was also elected. To settle this schism, a synod was summoned to Lexobia, marked by an apparition of Tugdual, who threatened Pergat with a terrible and rapid punishment if he did not withdraw. Pergat knelt down, begged pardon, and retired to Pouldouran, of which he is still the patron saint and where a fountain bearing his name exists. He ended his days by doing penitence as a hermit at Ty-Bergat. He died around 620.

The Saint-Bergat church in Pouldouran was built between 1859 and 1867.

== Sources ==
- Albert Le Grand, "Vie des saints de la Bretagne Armorique", 1636, réédition 1901, Quimper,
