= Victor de Cambon =

Saint Victor de Cambon
- Born: sixth century
- Died: sixth century near Nantes, Brittany
- Venerated in: Roman Catholic Church
- Feast: 31 August

Saint Victor de Cambon was a sixth-century hermit.

Victor was born in the parish of Cambon in 560. He lived on an island in the diocese of Nantes, near Pontchateau. A disciple of Saint Friard d'Indret, Saint Martin of Vertou or Saint Hermeland d'Indre. Although the Normans laid waste to his oratory in 878, it continued to be a place of miracles. His tomb was desecrated during the French Revolution and his relics are lost. His feast is 31 August.

== Source ==
- Paul Guerin. Les petits bollandistes
