= Ruelin =

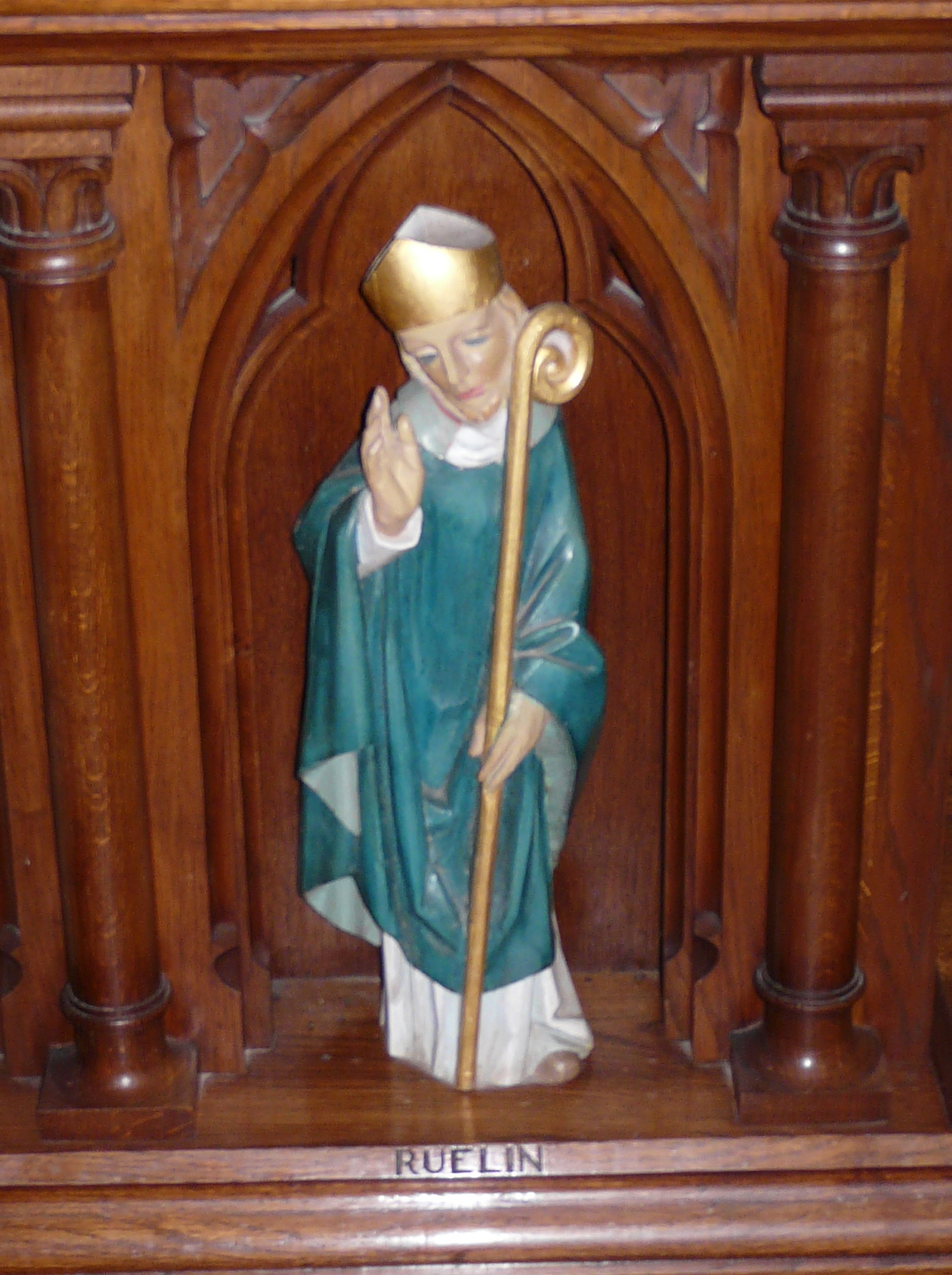
Saint Ruelin, church of St. Victor, La Grigonnais

Saint Ruelin (or Saint Rivelin) succeeded Saint Tudwal as Bishop of Tréguier. He died c. 650. His feast day is February 28.

== Life ==
Ruelin was a student of the Breton monk Tudwal who had established a hermitage on an island off the coast of North Wales.

Around 540, he emigrated with Tudwal to Armorica. Ruelin founded a hermitage, later a monastery, at present-day Châteauneuf-du-Faou. When Tudwal was dying, the priests asked him to select a successor, and he named Ruelin. His election was contested by Saint Pergat, canon and archpriest of Lexobie. who won a part of the clergy and the people to his cause. To remedy this schism, a synod was assembled at Lexobie, where the most skillful and learned ecclesiastics of the diocese were convoked to resolve the dispute. It took an appearance from Tudwal for Pergat to retire, ending his days in penance at Pouldouran.

== Legacy ==
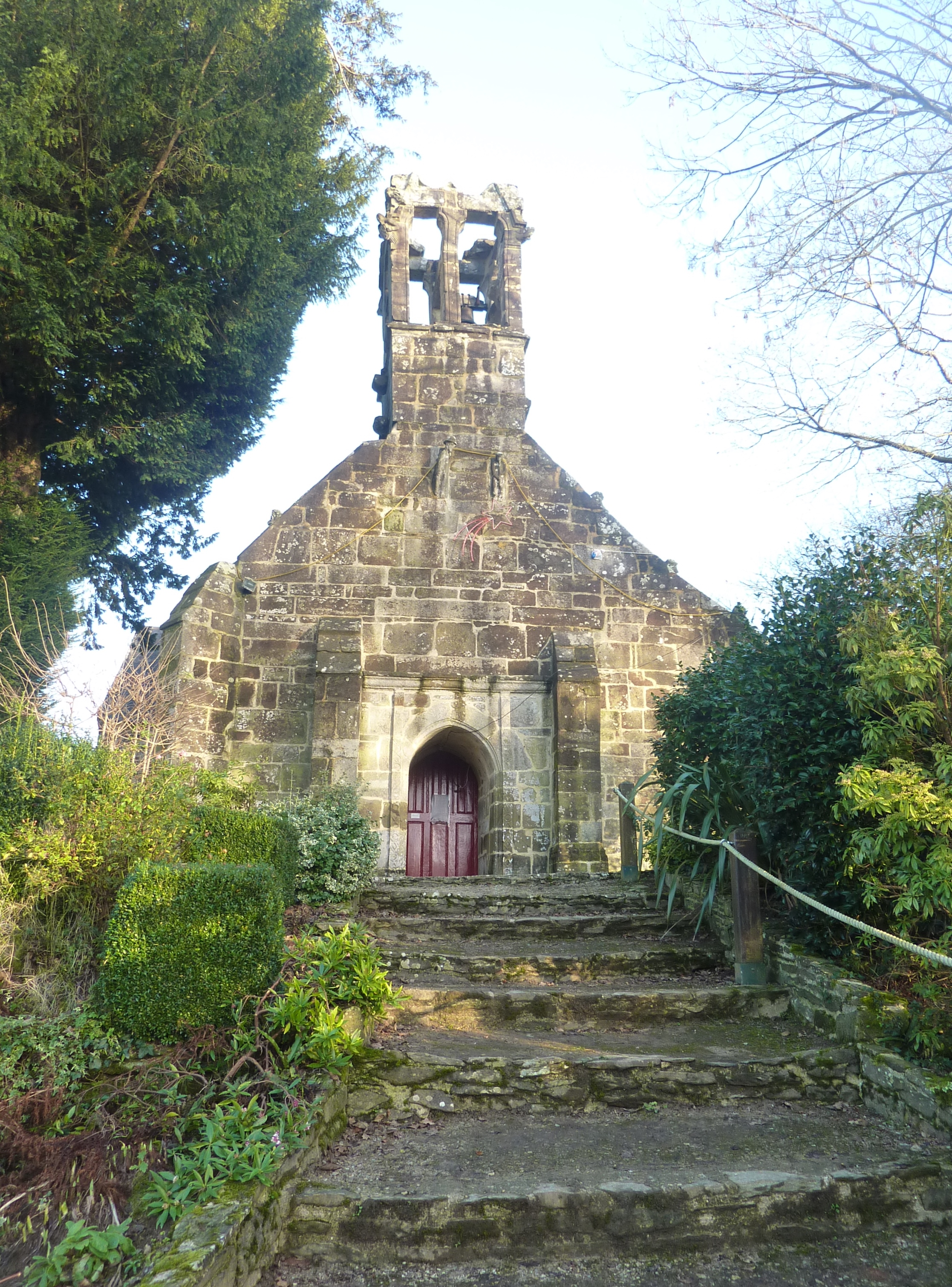
Chapelle Saint-Ruelin, Châteauneuf-du-Faou

Saint Maudez stayed at the monastery of Tréguier, and obtained permission from Abbot Ruelin to retire to a solitary place known today as Lanmodez.

According to Adolphe Guillou's Historical Essay on Tréguier, there used to be, in the center of rue Saint-Yves, an old chapel dedicated to Saint-Ruelin. In 2017, a statue of Saint-Ruelin, carved in walnut by sculptor Yann Toularastel, was installed in a niche at the bottom of rue Saint-Yves.

The village of Saint-Rivalain lies southeast of Melrand, at the confluence of the Sarre and the Blavet. There is a Saint Rivalain Street in the commune of Melrand.
