= Goulven of Léon =

Breton saint

Saint Goulven of Leon
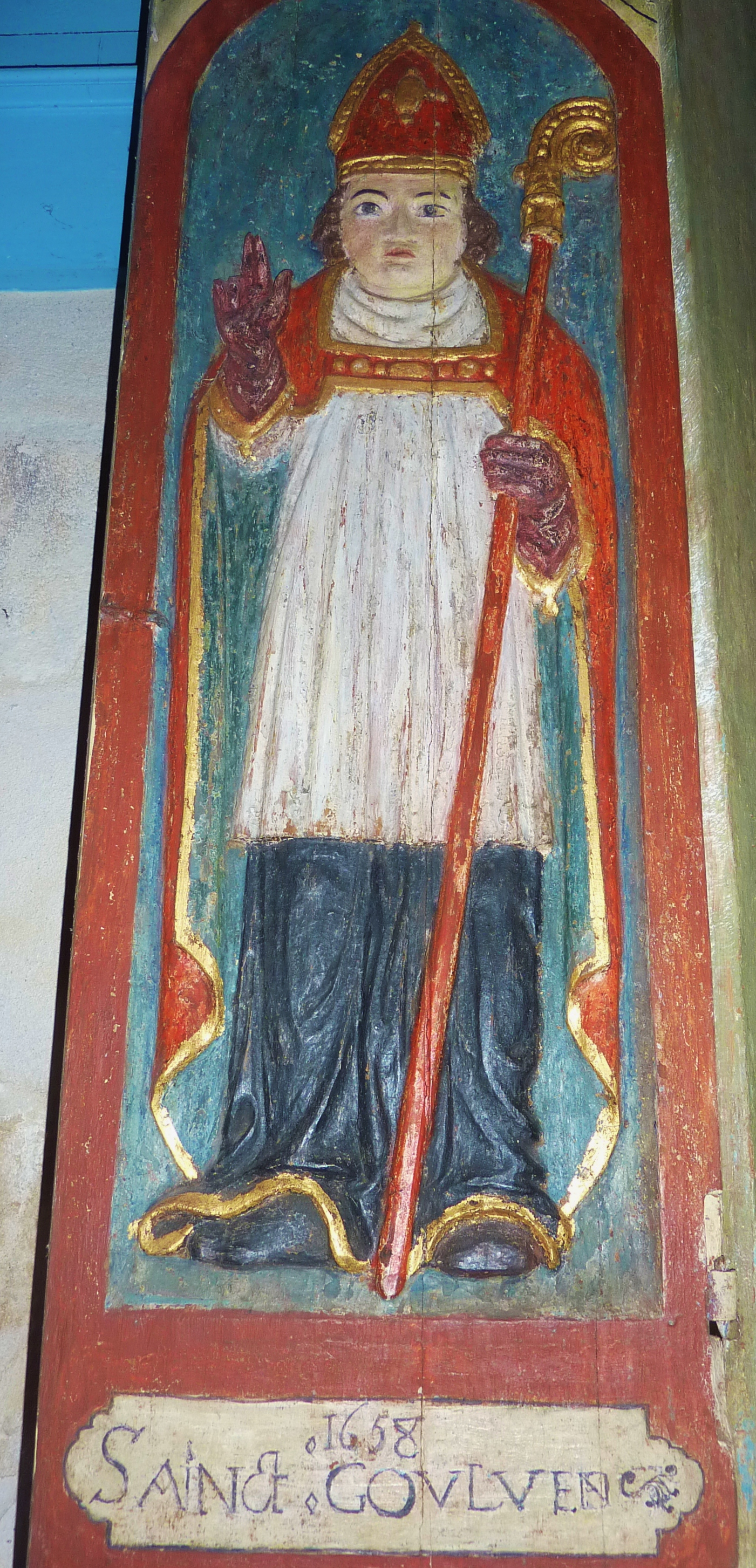

Bishop of Leon
- Born: sixth century Brittany
- Died: c. 616; Saint-Didier, Ille-et-Vilaine, Brittany
- Venerated in: Roman Catholic Church
- Feast: 1 July

Saint Goulven de Léon (also Golven, Golvinus, Golvenus) was a saint in Brittany in the 6th-7th century. Any knowledge of his life is derived from his vita, of which only a copy of a transcription of the original remains and whose historical accuracy is in question. According to that vita, he was the bishop of Saint-Pol-de-Léon in the seventh century, after having acquired a reputation as an ascetic and anchorite whose prayer and presence cured people and had helped fight off a Viking invasion. When he was elected as bishop, he tried to avoid that responsibility by going to Rome; after intervention by Pope Gregory I he returned and served for over a decade. He died in Rennes (on the other side of Brittany from Saint-Pol-de-Léon), where he was buried in the cathedral. He continued to be venerated in various parts of Brittany, most notably in the small commune of Goulven and other communes nearby in the Pays de Léon, the very western part of Finistère.

== Biography ==
According to his vita, collected by Albert Le Grand in the 1637 Lives of the Saints of Armorial Bretaigne, Saint Goulven was the son of immigrants from the British Isles who landed in 540 at Plouider. His father, Glaudan, and his pregnant mother, Gologuenn, landed in Plounéour-Trez Cove (also called Goulven Cove) in Brengorut when night fell; a local farmer, though he saw they were poor and in need, refused them lodging. That night Goulven was born, in a place called Odena. The next morning Glaudan asked at a nearby house for water to wash the child and refresh the mother but was rejected. A peasant gave him a bucket and showed him the way to a spring, but Glaudan lost his way in the forest and wandered around all day, until he found himself back with his wife and child. In agony, he prayed, and a spring with sweet water miraculously appeared. The spring (the Feunteun Sant Goulven), near which later the saint's church was built, was claimed to cure people miraculously.

After the news of the appearance of the spring became known, a rich man named Godian, a religious man without an heir, became the godfather and foster parent of the child. He named him and took care of his education; from his childhood Goulven practiced abstinence, living mostly on water and bread. Having finished his studies, Goulven retreated into the woods to continue his devotion to God. After his parents died, Godian offered to make him his heir, but Goulven declined, and built a little chapel near the coast, the Peneti Sant Goulven. The door opened to the north and, being always left open, thus exposed the interior to the cold north wind coming in from the ocean, but Goulven and his guests were as comfortable inside as if in a well-insulated manor.

Many visited him there, to learn from him and pray, or to find cures, but he would not allow any women in his hermitage or his chapel. He only took one meal a day, consisting of water and bread, and left his retreat only once per day, to take a daily journey to three stone crosses where he would pray at the foot of each one. When Vikings threatened the area, a local count named Even (a legendary figure, for whom the commune of Lesneven is named) visited Goulven and asked him to pray for him and his men; they were victorious in fighting off the invaders. In return, Goulven asked Even to give him some land to start a monastery on, and Even consented. As Goulven walked along the boundaries of the area, the land was miraculously raised on either side of him, creating a boundary that no one could violate; the area was called Menehi Sant Goulven, and became abundantly fertile. He continued his religious life now in the company of a disciple named Maden, and Even had a monastery built, but Goulven remained a hermit and turned down the offer of becoming abbot. The people of Léon built a chapel dedicated to Goulven at Odena (where he was born), where many miracles happened.

One day he sent Maden to a rich peasant, saying the man should give him whatever he was holding in his hands: the man gave Maden the three lumps of earth he was holding. When Maden gave those to Goulven, the dirt turned into gold, from which Goulven ordered three crosses and three bells made. One bell and cross were kept in the church at Goulven, but were lost in subsequent wars; the other bells were kept at Lesneven and Rennes (with the saint's relics), and a fourth one at the church of Goulven in Cornouaille. All performed miracles and punished those who swore false oaths.

In 602, Goulven was unanimously elected Bishop of Léon, but chose to escape his election by going to Rome, where God revealed his reputation and purpose to Pope Gregory I. The people of Léon had to choose another to take his place, but also informed the pope, who anointed him as bishop himself. He returned to Brittany and assumed his duties with great diligence. A few years after business called him to Rennes, where God revealed to him that he was to die; he told his disciple Maden that his death was imminent, and that Maden would not be able to take his body back to Léon. He then fell sick, and died on 1 June 616. He was buried in Rennes' Saint-Melaine Abbey.

== Textual history of the vita; problems and inconsistencies ==
=== Textual history ===
A Latin vita was written likely in the 11th century, during a flurry of activity which was part of a monastic reform in Brittany under the supervision of the great Benedictine abbeys in the Loire Valley. This reform prompted the writing of a large number of vitae of Breton saints, many of which were written by bishops who produced hagiographies themselves in the absence of a monastic cadre. The Latin account is retained (only) in an 18th-c Benedictine transcription of a 17th-c text from an unknown legendary; a French translation of the 17th-c copy was published by Albert Le Grand for his Les vies des saints de la Bretagne Armorique, where he is listed for 1 July. Le Grand based his text on manuscripts he got from the Leon Cathedral; Arthur Le Moyne de La Borderie, a Breton historian, says he must have used the same manuscript on that same 17th-c text. Le Grand, in the 17th century, had access to a document that was followed by a list of fifteen miracles that occurred after the saint's death, and he added a summary of those to the life he published. The standard edition of the vita is by de La Borderie, published in 1891.

That the vita was the product of the community of Saint-Pol is made clear by a reference to "patronus noster", whom Julia Smith identifies as Paul Aurelian. The vita acknowledges that there is no written documentation or oral tradition on the reign of Goulven as a bishop, and is mostly concerned with the places associated with the saint—the spring (or fountain, fons Golvini) and the hermitage (his peniti, or cell, with the menihi, or surrounding land). The vita explains that his body was at Rennes, though a hand was brought to Léon; in the absence of relics, the cult of the saint was built on a number of objects associated with him: three golden crosses, a chalice, and three golden bells. The saint's original bell was stolen, but a golden crucifix was still performing miracles by the time the vita was written.

=== Problems and inconsistencies ===
The vita says that Goulven's hermitage was plebs Desiderii, but what that reference means is not clear. Charles de Calan, in a critique of the saint's account given by de La Borderie, notes the reference may apply to two possible locations named for Saint Didier of Rennes: one tradition places it in Rennes, the other in Léon—but these are on opposite sides of Brittany. De La Borderie aimed to reconcile these two, but de Calan says he did so without textual evidence. In fact, de Calan argues, it is entirely unlikely that a. Goulven's body, if indeed he had been bishop in Léon, would have been left in Rennes; and b. that Goulven was supposed to be a bishop in Léon in the first place, not in Rennes. De Calan finds no evidence of any ancient cult of Goulven in Léon (and he is not found in any of the litanies of the 11th century from the area): the vita appears to belong to a group of similar hagiographies written and redacted in the 13th and 14th centuries to promote Léon—this included the ferrying of material about Letavia (that is, Armorica) to Leonia, or Léon. Other errors, or geographical and etymological errors and problems, suggest that the entire vita be considered a fable, according to de Calan.

De Calan thinks likewise that the vita's explanation of the election of Goulven as bishop of the Léon diocese is unlikely, and serves no other purpose then to bring the tenure of Cetomerinus (whose historicity is accepted by scholars) in agreement with the vita's election of Goulven, whose initial refusal or hesitance to serve as bishop thus allowed the hagiography to be reconciled with the history of the bishopric. In reality, says de Calan, these machinations also suggest Goulven was simply inserted into the Léon history. He may have been bishop of Rennes or, possibly, may have been regarded as having been a bishop of Rennes since it was in the possession of the body of a man who led a saintly life.

A different kind of confusion was noted in 1971 by Donatien Laurent, in an article discussing the many varieties of the Breton poem Gwerz Skolan: Laurent claims that the main character of that poem became confused with Goulven. A gwerz is a Breton folk song with epic qualities, and the protagonist, Iannic Skolan (also Skolvan, and Gaulish Yscolan; they resemble Myrddin Wyllt, the source for the sorcerer Merlin), is a legendary murderer and rapist who seeks forgiveness from his mother after coming back from hell. Many versions of the song exist; Laurent heard a version sung by a woman from Plounévézel in which Skolan (named "Skolvam" in her version) and Golven had merged. In what Laurent calls the "Cornouaille tradition" of the song, when Skolvam's mother doubts his identity, a spring miraculously appears. This combined with a blessing for Skolvan by the pope in the Plounévézel version indicate, according to Laurent, a confusion between the saint and the legendary murderer which also gives rise to a number of local place names that combine elements of both: "Golven, Kolven, Golban, Eskolvenn, Skolvant, Stolvennig, Skoulvani".

== Cult and legacy ==
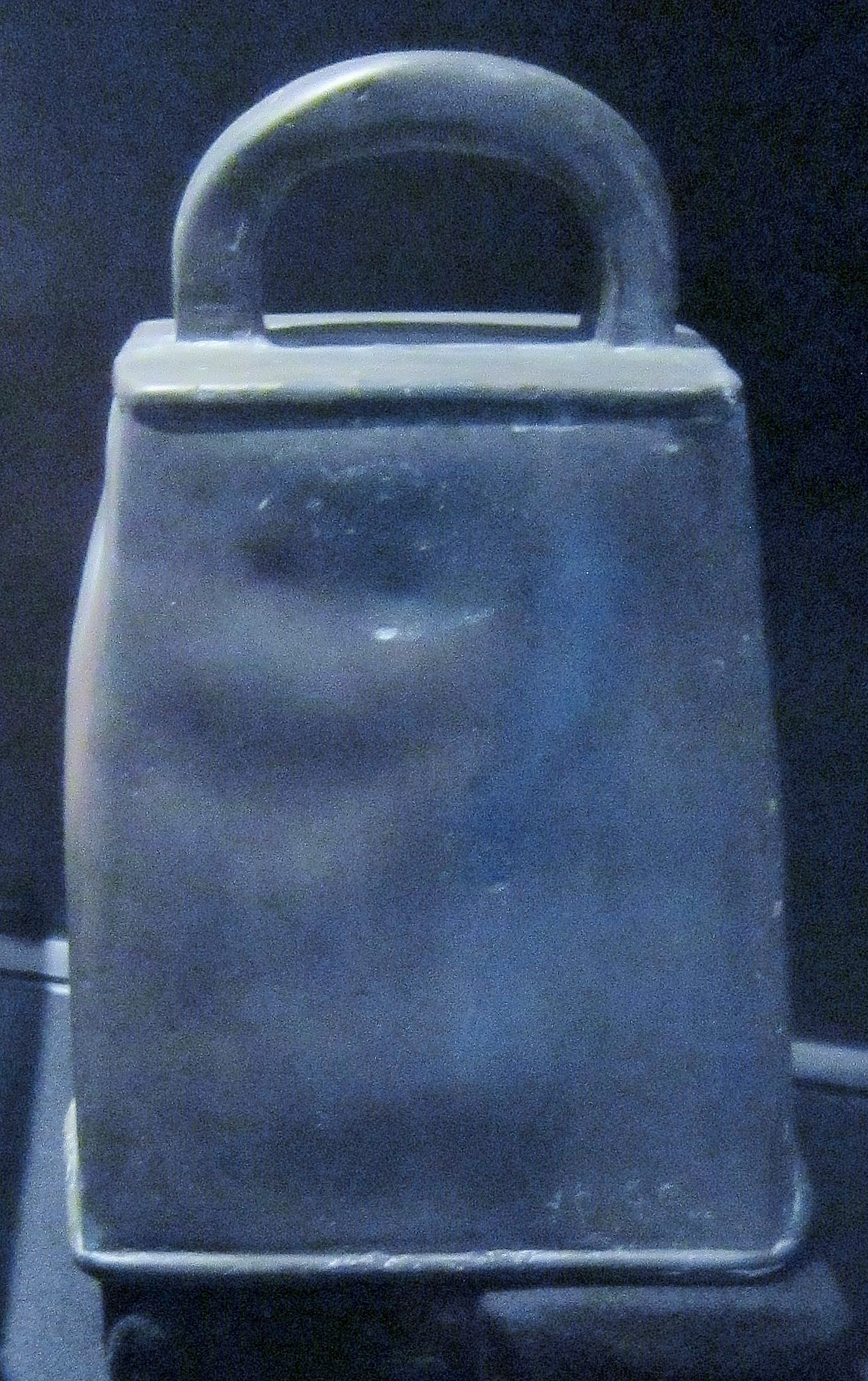
The saint's bell, in the Goulven parish church.

According to François Plaine, a Benedictine priest who wrote about Goulven's vita in 1889, Goulven's death led instantly to a cult in Rennes and the larger area of Léon which had witnessed "his life, his virtues, and his first miracles". Hervé Martin and Louis Martin, in a study of religious monuments and sacred spaces in Brittany, noted that the three stone crosses were still reported as in situ in the 19th century, but they consider it most likely that the crosses were part of a program from the Carolingian period designed to commemorate the saint.

Julia Smith notes that the miracles associated with the saint did not rely on primary relics, nor do they take place within an organized cult overseen by the clergy. Only one of them is a miraculous cure, which takes place at the saint's fountain. Smith notes also that Goulven's life, death, and cult, like those of Paul Aurelian (whose vita also featured a spring and crosses), show that the area's religious landscape is one "where features of the landscape and bells and crosses were the focal points for saints' cults, not bones and shrines." This lack of focus on relics is a particular feature of Breton hagiography, says Smith.

The cult of Goulven survived the Reformation and the French Revolution. He may have lost some of his status, but was retained in the calendars at Rennes and at Quimper, and he likewise retained the patronage of a number of places. Viking attacks in the area forced the monks of Saint-Melaine to move the body of their patron saint, Saint Melan, but they left Goulven's, which remained intact, in its coffin, until 1224, when the bishop of Rennes, Jean Gicquel, took off the head to place it in a separate reliquary. In 1336, under the episcopacy of Guillaume Ouvrouin, the cask that kept Goulven's body was renovated. In 1533, bishop Yves Mahyeuc removed an arm and gave it to the Goulven parish, and doubtlessly, according to Plaine, during this time many other unrecorded gifts of relics must have been made, because by 1743 only the head, divided in two parts, and a number of greater and smaller bones was left. The head disappeared during the French Revolution, but some larger bones were still in the Rennes Cathedral by 1889, and remained the center of Goulven's cult, whose celebration in the Rennes diocese culminates on 9 July.

Plaine, in 1889, described a lively cult in Rennes on the saint's feast day, all the more special since it is a double celebration: the Roman Liturgy celebrates Goulven with an octave beginning on 1 July, and his translation is remembered on 23 August. In public processions, his coffin was carried through the streets.

From early on, Goulven was also remembered with double celebrations in the dioceses of Saint-Pol-de-Leon and Quimper, which after the dissolution during the French Revolution were restored (through the Concordat of 1801) as the Roman Catholic Diocese of Quimper. By 1889, he was still the patron of two parishes in that diocese and the object of special veneration, according to Plaine: Goulven and Goulien. In Goulven a fountain is associated with him and the parish has a few small relics, but a femur, formerly thought to be the saint's and given to the parish in 1533, is no longer venerated since its authenticity could not be established. Goulien has a bell associated with the saint. Goulven has a reliquary consisting of an arm made of wood, which contains an arm made of silver, which in turn contains a relic of the saint.

=== Places named for the saint ===
Places named for the saint are found in the Breton communes of Lanvellec (St-Goulven), Caurel (St-Golven), Lanloup (St-Golven), Plouider (Keroulien), Taupont (St-Golvin), Feuillée (St- Voulc'hien), Bubry (Locolven), Inguiniel (Locolven), and Locmaria-Plouzané (Goulven). If Goulven is to be identified with the saint Gonvel or Gonval venerated in the commune of Landunvez, as seemed likely to Plaine, then 9 or 10 small chapels and altars there are also to be connected to Saint Goulven. The extensive Forêt de Quénécan in the middle of Brittany is sometimes named for him: lande de Saint Golven.

== Bibliography ==
- Baring-Gould, Sabine (1901). "A Catalogue of Saints Connected with Cornwall, with an Epitome of Their Lives, and List of Churches and Chapels Dedicated to Them, D-G". Journal of the Royal Institution of Cornwall. 14: 85–172.
- La Borderie, Arthur (1891). "Texte de la vie latine ancienne et inédite de Saint Goulven avec notes et commentaire historique". Société d'Émulation des Côtes du Nord Mémoires de l'année 1891 (in French): 214–250.
- Bourges, A.-Y. (1995). "Guillaume Le Breton et l'hagiographie bretonne aux 12th - 13th siècles". Annales de Bretagne et des pays de l'Ouest. 102 (1): 35–45. doi:10.3406/abpo.1995.3804.
- Le Breton, H. (1933). Un vieux saint breton: saint Goulven ou Golven, évêque de Léon. Rennes.
- De Calan, Charles (1908). "Mélanges Historiques". Revue de Bretagne (in French). 31: 121–27.
- Gendry, Mickaël (2010). "Les minihis en Bretagne entre le IXe et le XIIe siècle: des territoires monastiques sacralisés?". Annales de Bretagne et des Pays de l'Ouest. 117 (2): 25–55. doi:10.4000/abpo.1766. ISSN 0399-0826.
- Le Grand, Albert (1901). "La vie de Saint Goulven". Les vies des saints de la Bretagne Armorique : ensemble un ample catalogue chronologique et historique des evesques d'icelle (5 ed.).
- Laurent, Donatien (1971). "La gwerz de Skolan et la légende de Merlin". Ethnologie Française. New Series (in French). 1 (3/4): 19–54. JSTOR 40988167.
- Lobineau, Guy Alexis (1836). "S. Goulven, évêque de Léon". Vies des saints de Bretagne (in French). Méquignon Junior. pp. 323–29.
- Martin, Hervé; Martin, Louis (1977). "Croix rurales et sacralisation de l'espace: Le cas de la Bretagne au Moyen Age". Archives de sciences sociales des religions (in French). 43 (1): 23–38. doi:10.3406/assr.1977.2111. JSTOR 30120945.
- Oheix, André (1912). Les Évêques de Léon aux Xe et XIe siècles. Nantes: L. Durance.
- Plaine, François (1889). "Vie inédite de Saint Goulven Évêque de Saint-Pol-de-Léon (550?-614?)". Bulletin de la Société archéologique du Finistère (in French). 18: 24–33.
- Smith, Julia M. H. (1990). "Oral and Written: Saints, Miracles, and Relics in Brittany, c. 850-1250". Speculum. 65 (2): 309–343. doi:10.2307/2864295. JSTOR 2864295. S2CID 162747789.
- Smith, William B. S. (1940). "De la Toponymie Bretonne Dictionnaire Étymologique". Language. 16 (2): 3–136. doi:10.2307/522121. JSTOR 522121.
- Toscer, G. (1907). Le Finistère pittoresque: ptie. Pays de Léon et Tréguier. Le Finistère pittoresque: sites & monuments (in French). Vol. 4. A. Kaigre.
