= Viaud =

Viaud is a surname. Notable people with the surname include:

- Julien Viaud (1850–1923), French novelist and naval officer, wrote under the pseudonym Pierre Loti
- Laurent Viaud (born 1969), French writer
- Pierre Viaud, French writer

== See also ==
- Saint-Viaud, French commune
