= Victoire Conen de Saint-Luc =

French religious sister (1761–1794)

Blessed Victorie Conen de Saint-Luc
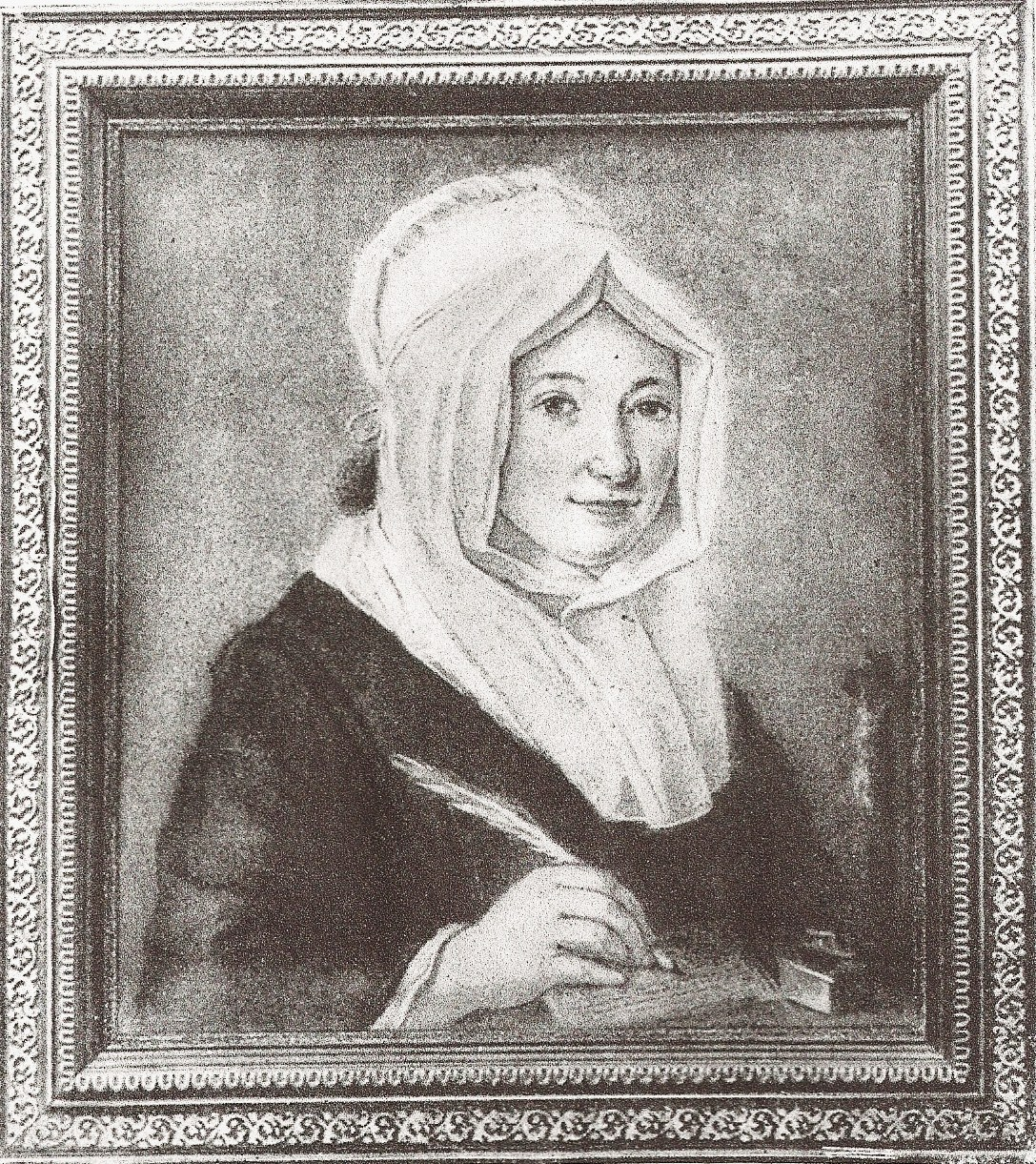
- Self-portrait in the religious habit of the Dames de La Retraite

Virgin martyr
- Born: 27 January 1761; Brittany, Kingdom of France
- Died: 19 July 1794; Place de la Nation, Paris, French First Republic
- Cause of death: Execution by Guillotine
- Resting place: Picpus Cemetery
- Beatified: 1919 by Benedict XV

Victoire Conen de Saint-Luc (27 January 1761 – 19 July 1794) was a French religious sister. She suffered martyrdom during The Terror, sentenced for allegedly supporting the War in the Vendée. A beatification process was instigated in 1919.

== Life ==
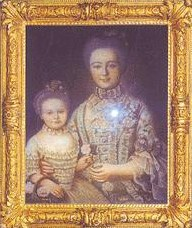
Portrait of Victoire Conen de Saint-Luc and her mother

Victoire Conen de Saint-Luc was born in Rennes on 27 January 1761, the daughter of the Breton noble and judge Gilles Conen de Saint-Luc and Françoise Marie du Bot. In February 1782, she became a religious sister of the Dames de la Retraite in Quimper. The convent specialized in offering retreats for women.

During the French Revolution, the convent was closed, and the community accept the hospitality of the Benedictines of Calvary in Quimper (on the site of the current Lycée Chaptal). In June 1792, Victoire returned to her family, residing at the castle of Bot, Quimerc'h, where her father had settled in 1775 after resigning his office in the Parliament of Brittany. Practicing devotion to the Sacred Heart, she had painted pictures and insignia like those worn by many Vendée insurgents, and which she had also given to a sympathizer of the rebellion. This incriminated her as a rebel sympathizer, and she was suspected for knowingly having contact with the rebels and for being a supporter of the uprising. In 1793, she was arrested and interned in Carhaix prison, where she spends her time in prayer, consoling other prisoners, reading, embroidery, and writing.

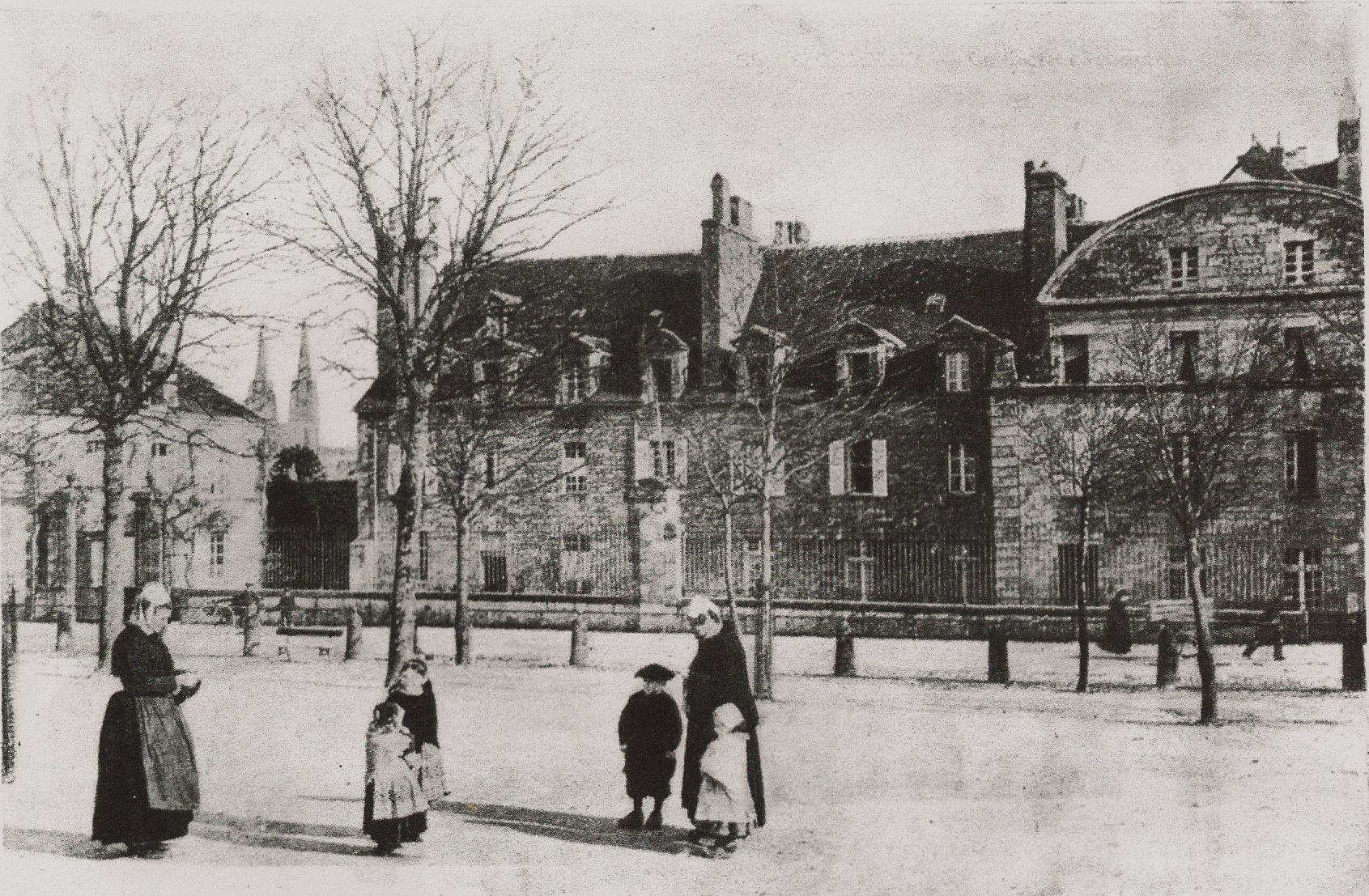
Convent of the Dames de la Retraite in Quimper

De Saint-Luc's parents were soon incriminated and accused of being her accomplices. On 10 October 1793 her father Gilles Conen de Saint-Luc, former president of the Parliament of Brittany, her mother Francoise Marie du Bot, and Victoire were arrested and taken to Carhaix prison and from there to Quimper, then, separately, to Paris, where their file had been sent to the Revolutionary Tribunal. They found themselves in the prison of the Conciergerie. She had some talent for painting, and several portraits painted by her are preserved, some made in the prison.

On 19 July 1794 De Saint-Luc and her parents appeared before the Revolutionary Court, which convened two days earlier to condemn to death as "fanatical and seditious" the Martyrs of Compiegne. The De Saint-Lucs did not have legal counsel, nor an opportunity to explain or defend themselves. They were condemned to death as "enemies of the people, for having seconded the revolt of the Vendée brigands and fanaticism" and executed by guillotine in the Place de la Nation. Victoire asked to be executed first, telling her parents: "You taught me to live; with the grace of God, I will teach you how to die." Their corpses were thrown into a common grave hastily dug not far away, at the end of the garden of a convent of canonesses of St. Augustine which had been closed and requisitioned. This place is today Picpus Cemetery.

== Beatification process ==
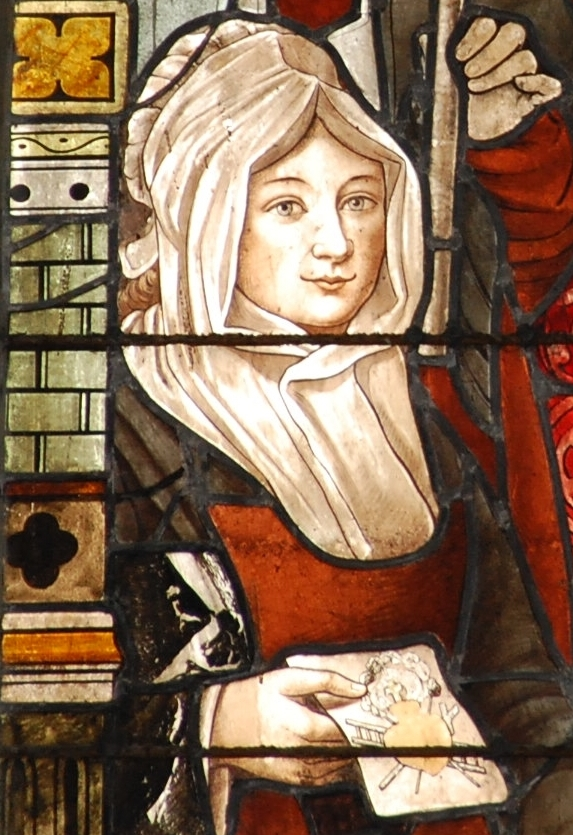
Stained glass window in the parish church St. Mathieu

The beatification cause of Victoire Conen de Saint Luc was joined in 1919 to that of the Martyrs of the Revolutionary Tribunal of Paris. Reviews by the Archdiocese of Paris took place in 1920 and 1921 and in 1925 documents were sent to the Sacred Congregation of Rites (now the Dicastery for the Causes of Saints). However, the death of the postulator of the cause induced the interruption of the process.

Victoire Conen de Saint-Luc was considered a martyr executed for religious reasons by counter revolutionaries, and the new retreat, which was re-founded after the revolution, was dedicated to her. She was depicted in several churches in Brittany, and in 1923 a school, the "Victoire Conen de Saint-Luc", was named after her.

A portrait of Victoire Conen de Saint-Luc, and another of her uncle Bishop Toussaint Conen of Saint-Luc, the last bishop of Cornouaille, who died in 1790, are in the church of Saint-Jacques de Pouldavid in Douarnenez.

Victoire Conen de Saint-Luc is represented on a stained glass window in four churches and chapels of the diocese of Quimper:

- In the Church of Pluguffan, in the stained glass window of the Sacred Heart (1892), Victoire is shown as a religious sister, kneeling (at her feet she sees a guillotine chopper), holding in her hand an image of the Sacred Heart, the Margaret Mary Alacoque (1647–1690), an inspiration for the cult of the Sacred Heart, standing behind her. Bishop Toussaint Conen of Saint-Luc is also kneeling, with John the Evangelist standing behind him.
- In the north transept of the Saint-Mathieu church in Quimper, Victoire de Saint-Luc also appears in the large stained glass window entitled "Apparition of the Sacred Heart" (Ateliers Champigneulle, Paris, 1896 ), in the company of many saints, among whom we recognize Ss. John Eudes, Margaret-Marie Alacoque, John the Evangelist, Francis of Assisi, and presumably Longin.
- In the old chapel of the Grand Seminary of Quimper, on the Epistle side 4, in the stained glass window (1896) which is above the altar of the Sacred Heart, one can see Victoire kneeling and holding an image of the Sacred Heart in front of Françoise d'Amboise.
- In the parish church of Saint-Tudec-et-Sainte-Anne in Landudec, she is also represented on the stained glass window of the Sacré-Coeur (J.-P. Florence Studio, 1905), located on the Sainte-Anne altar. In the center of the stained glass window is the Sacred Heart; on the right side, Victoire kneeling, showing the image of the Sacred Heart, painted and embroidered by her standing; behind her stands Marguerite-Marie Alacoque. Also on the left Bishop Toussaint Conen of Saint Luc, and behind him the Jesuit Claude La Colombière, apostle of the devotion of the Sacred Heart.

In 1923, a private primary school of girls "Victoire Conen de Saint-Luc", with internship, was built in Landudec.

== Sources ==
- Mother Saint-Patrick, Victoire de Saint-Luc, a martyr under the terror, London, Longmans, Green and Co, 1920

== Bibliography ==
- Hervé Gourmelon, The tragic Destiny of five inhabitants of Brittany in 1794 under Terror: Victoire Conen of Saint-Luc and his parents, Anne Pichot of Querdisien, Petronille Bochhen, Christian editions, 2007, 228 p.
- (in Breton) Jean-Marie Le Gall, Buez Victory of Saint Luc: leanez e kouent arretret e Kemper, Brest, 1921, 104 p.
- Alexis Cosnier, A Lady of the Retirement of Quimper martyrdom under the Terror (1761-1794), Paris, Gabriel Beauchesne, 1919, 423 p., Available http://www.liberius.net/livres/Victoire_Conen_de_Saint-Luc_000000825.pdf [archive] (hagiography).
- Pierre-Xavier Pouplard, A martyrdom in the last days of the Terror: Victory of Saint-Luc, Lady of the Retreat in Quimper, Lille, Desclée de Brouwer, 1882, 286 p.
- Paul Debuchy, The Retirement of Quimper and Victory Conen of Saint Luke, Collection of the Library of the Exercises of Saint Ignatius No. 31, 1910, 96 p.
