= Goeznovius =

Saint Goeznovius
- Born: Unknown; Cornwall
- Died: c. 675? Quimper, Finistère, Brittany, France
- Venerated in: Roman Catholic Church, Eastern Orthodox Church
- Feast: 25 October

Goeznovius (died c. 675 according to one account but more probably fl. sixth century.), also known as Goueznou, was a Cornish-born Bishop of Léon in Brittany, who is venerated as a saint in the region around Brest and the diocese of Léon. According to his Legenda he was born in Cornwall and became one of many of his countrymen who moved to the continent in the wake of the Anglo-Saxon invasions and helped found the Brittonic settlement in Armorica that became established as Brittany. His feast day is celebrated on 25 October.

== Legenda Sancti Goeznovii ==
Goeznovius is known through his hagiography, the Legenda Sancti Goeznovii. The author names himself as William, a Breton chaplain in the familia of the otherwise-unattested Bishop Eudo of Léon, and gives a date of 1019 for the work, though it is now dated to the late 12th or early 13th century AD. The Legenda includes an unusual preface detailing the history of Brittany and including some episodes from Britain's traditional history.

The preface describes the traditional story of Vortigern, who usurps the British throne and invites Saxon warriors into the country as protection. The Saxons caused great suffering among the Britons, until they were largely driven out by the new king, Arthur. Arthur proceeded to win battles in Britain and in Gaul but was eventually "summoned… from human activity," paving the way for the Saxons to return. The Saxon persecution caused many of the Britons to flee to Gaul, where they established Brittany.

J. S. P. Tatlock set out signs that the preface to William's Legenda followed the outlines of Geoffrey of Monmouth's Historia Regum Britanniae, written around 1136, and therefore that the date 1019 was a fiction but this conclusion has been challenged by Léon Fleuriot: the preface includes material that is found in early sources but not in Geoffrey, suggesting that the author had access to some earlier document. More recently André-Yves Bourgès has demonstrated that the author of the Life is most likely Guillaume le Breton (c. 1166-1226 AD).

For those who consider it independent of Geoffrey the Legende, as an early historical account that depicts Arthur without fantastic or legendary touches, is an important historical basis for King Arthur. The text may imply that Arthur succeeds Vortigern directly whereas Geoffrey claims two kings reigned between them (Aurelius Ambrosius and Uther Pendragon). If so it places his activities during the period of Saxon unrest in the mid-5th century.
