= Saint Hervé =

Breton saint (c. 521 – 575 AD)

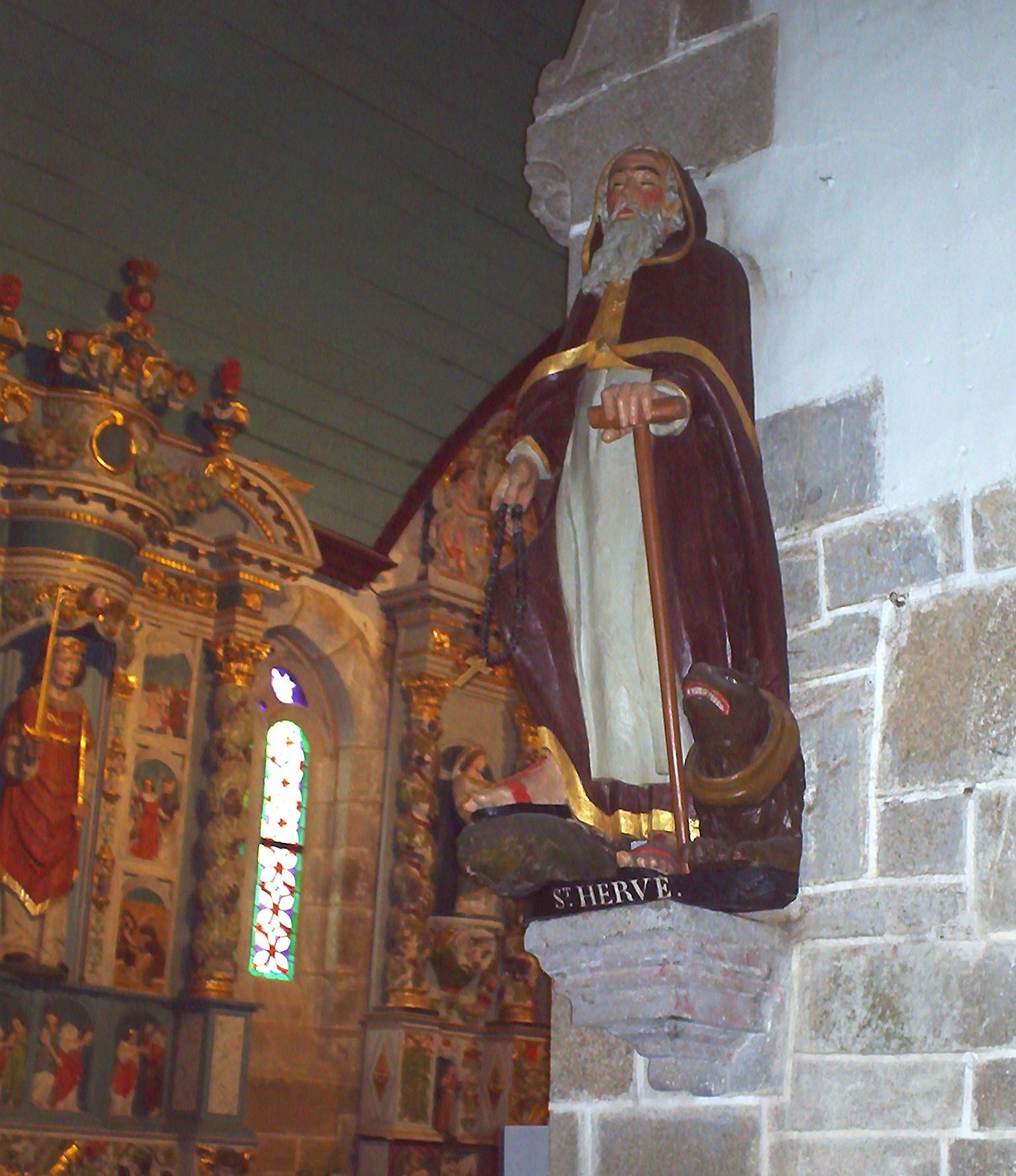
- Effigy of St Hervé, with St Milau in the background, in the parish church at Guimiliau.
- Born: c. 521; Guimiliau, Breton chiefdoms
- Died: c. 575
- Venerated in: Eastern Orthodox Church; Roman Catholic Church
- Feast: 17 June
- Attributes: Blind abbot being led by a wolf or his child guide
- Patronage: The blind; bards; musicians; invoked against eye problems, eye disease; invoked to cure sick horses

Saint Hervé (c. 521 – 575 AD), also known as Harvey, Herveus, or Houarniaule, was a sixth-century Breton saint. Along with Saint Ives, he is one of the most popular of the Breton saints. He was born in Guimiliau (Gwimilio).

== Legend ==
Hervé was the son of a Welsh bard named Hyvarnion, who had studied under Cadoc. Hyvarnion became a minstrel at the court of Childebert I. His mother was Rivanone, a woman of surpassing beauty who knew the properties of plants and herbs. Hervé was the nephew of the hermit Saint Urfold.

Hervé was born blind. His father died when Hervé was still quite young. He inherited his father's harp. His mother became an anchoress and entrusted the seven-year-old boy to the care of his uncles who placed him with a learned hermit who lived in the forest. At about fourteen years of age, he went to study at the monasastic school at Plouvien, where his maternal uncle, Gourvoyed was abbot. Hervé grew up to become a teacher and minstrel.

With his disciple Guiharan, Hervé lived near Plouvien as a hermit and bard. He had the power to cure animals and was accompanied by a domesticated wolf. His wolf devoured the ox or donkey Hervé used in plowing. Hervé then preached a sermon that was so eloquent that the wolf begged to be allowed to serve in the ox's stead. Hervé's wolf pulled the plow from that day on.

He was joined by disciples and refused any ordination or earthly honour, accepting only to be ordained as an exorcist. He died in 556 AD and was buried at Lanhouarneau.

== Veneration ==
Saint Hervé is venerated throughout Brittany. His feast day is June the 17th. He is represented accompanied by a tame wolf.

In Lanrivoaré, the hermitage of Saint-Hervé, built according to the model of Irish hermitages, houses the ruins of a chapel, a fountain and a stone cell said to have housed the saint.

For fear of the Normans, his relics were removed to a silver shrine in the chapel of the Château de Brest. Given to the Bishop of Nantes, they were lost during the Revolution.

== See also ==
- Plomodiern Parish close
