= Friard d'Indret =

Saint Friard d'Indret (511–577) is a religious figure who contributed to the evangelization of the Nantes region during the 6th century.

Saint Friard grew up in a family of laborers. At the age of 53, he decided to retire in solitude and austerity to an island of the Loire called Vindomitte, near Nantes. He was soon joined by a native of Nantes named Secondel; both decided to lead poor, humble lives of prayer and penance. According to Gregory of Tours, sometime between 526 and 549, they settled in Besné in the marshes of Brière, where they lived in separate cells.

Friard died in 577, some time after Secondel. They became the patron saints of the parish.

His feast day is on August 1.

== Sources ==
- GrandTerrier
