= Albert Le Grand =

Breton hagiographer (1599–1641)

Albert Le Grand de Kerigouval (1599 in Morlaix – 1641 in Rennes) was a Breton hagiographer and a Dominican brother. He is sometimes referred to as "the Breton Froissart".

== Biography ==
Born in Morlaix, he made his profession in the Rennes monastery before being assigned to that in his hometown in 1622 or 1623. Born Jean Le Grand, he chose the name Albertus Magnus after the saint canonized in 1622.

== Works ==
His writings, devoted to Breton hagiographic and historical subjects, were very popular. He is best known for his Lives of the Saints of Armorican Brittany, published in 1637 in Nantes by Pierre Doriou, and for which he notably used ancient manuscripts no longer extant. Despite his eccentric methods, in which he "commonly rendered 'Britain' by 'Angleterre', and turned the British duces into Earls of Oxford to the like," John Morris still credited Le Grand with salvaging "something of many [saints' lives] that did not survive the Revolution."

This first Breton hagiographical work includes 78 lives of saints, three stories and nine episcopal catalogs, one for each of the historical Breton dioceses (Saint-Pol-de-Léon, Quimper, Tréguier, Saint-Brieuc, Vannes, Saint-Malo, Nantes, Dol-de-Bretagne and Rennes). Brenda M. Cook writes that Albert "interpreted the term saints very generously" and included "not only all the formally and informally canonised saints of Brittany but also abbots, bishops and notably pious laypeople such as the Duchess Ermengard."

The work was expanded and republished under the auspices of Guy Autret of Missirien (Rennes, Jean Vatar, 1659), who had collaborated with the Dominican, in 1680. Daniel-Louis Miorcec de Kerdanet offered a new edition, without the episcopal catalogs, in 1837 (P. Anner in Brest).

The standard edition remains that of the "Three Canons", published in 1901 (J. Salaün, Quimper) by Alexandre-Marie Thomas, Jean-Marie Abgrall and Paul Peyron.

Le Grand also published in 1640 the Providence of God on the Righteous in the Admirable History of St. Budoc Archbishop of Dol in J. Durand in Rennes. This life of saint Budoc has been integrated into the successive reissues of the Lives of the Saints of the Armorican Brittany (with the modified title since its second reissue in 1680 as Lives of the Saints of Armorican Brittany).

== Bibliography ==
- La vie, gestes, mort et miracles des Saints de la Bretagne Armorique, ensemble un catalogue des évêques des neuf eveschés d'icelle (1659) available at Google Books.
- Les vies des saints de la Bretagne Armorique (1901) available at Gallica
