= Armorica =

Region of Gaul between the Seine and Loire rivers

Coordinates: 48.1667°N 1.0000°W

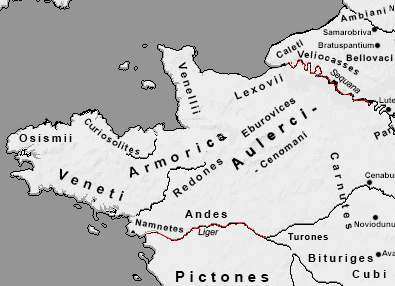
The Roman geographical area of Armorica. The Seine and the Loire are marked in red.

In ancient times, Armorica or Aremorica was a region of Gaul between the Seine and the Loire that includes the Brittany Peninsula, and much of historical Normandy.

== Name ==
The name Armorica is a Latinized form of the Gaulish toponym Aremorica, which literally means 'place in front of the sea'. It is formed with the prefix are- ('in front of') attached to -mori- ('sea') and the feminine suffix -(i)cā, denoting the localization (or provenance). The inhabitants of the region were called Aremorici (sing. Aremoricos), formed with the stem are-mori- extended by the determinative suffix -cos. It is glossed by the Latin antemarini ('coastal', 'before the sea') in Endlicher's Glossary. The Slavs use a similar formation, Po-mor-jane ('those in front of the sea'), to designate the inhabitants of Pomerania. The Latin adjective Armoricani was an administrative term designating in particular a sector of the Roman defence line in Gaul in Late Antiquity, the Tractus Armoricani ('Armorican Tract').

In medieval Insular Celtic languages, the Celtic term *Litauia, meaning 'Land' or 'Country' (from an original Proto-Celtic *Litauī 'Earth', lit. 'the Vast One'), came to be used to designate the Brittany Peninsula, as in Old Irish Letha, Old Welsh Litau, Old Breton Letau, or in the Latinized form Letavia.

=== Similar term in Breton ===
In Breton, which belongs to the Brythonic branch of the Insular Celtic languages, along with Welsh and Cornish, "on [the] sea" is war vor, but the older word arvor (with a non-related prefix "ar") is used to refer to the coastal regions of Brittany, in contrast to argoad (ar "on/at", coad "forest" [Welsh ar goed or coed "trees"]) for the inland regions. If the Breton usage of these terms corresponds with the Gaulish usage of Aremorica, this could suggest that the Romans first contacted coastal people in the inland region and assumed that the regional name Aremorica referred to the whole area, both coastal and inland.

== History ==
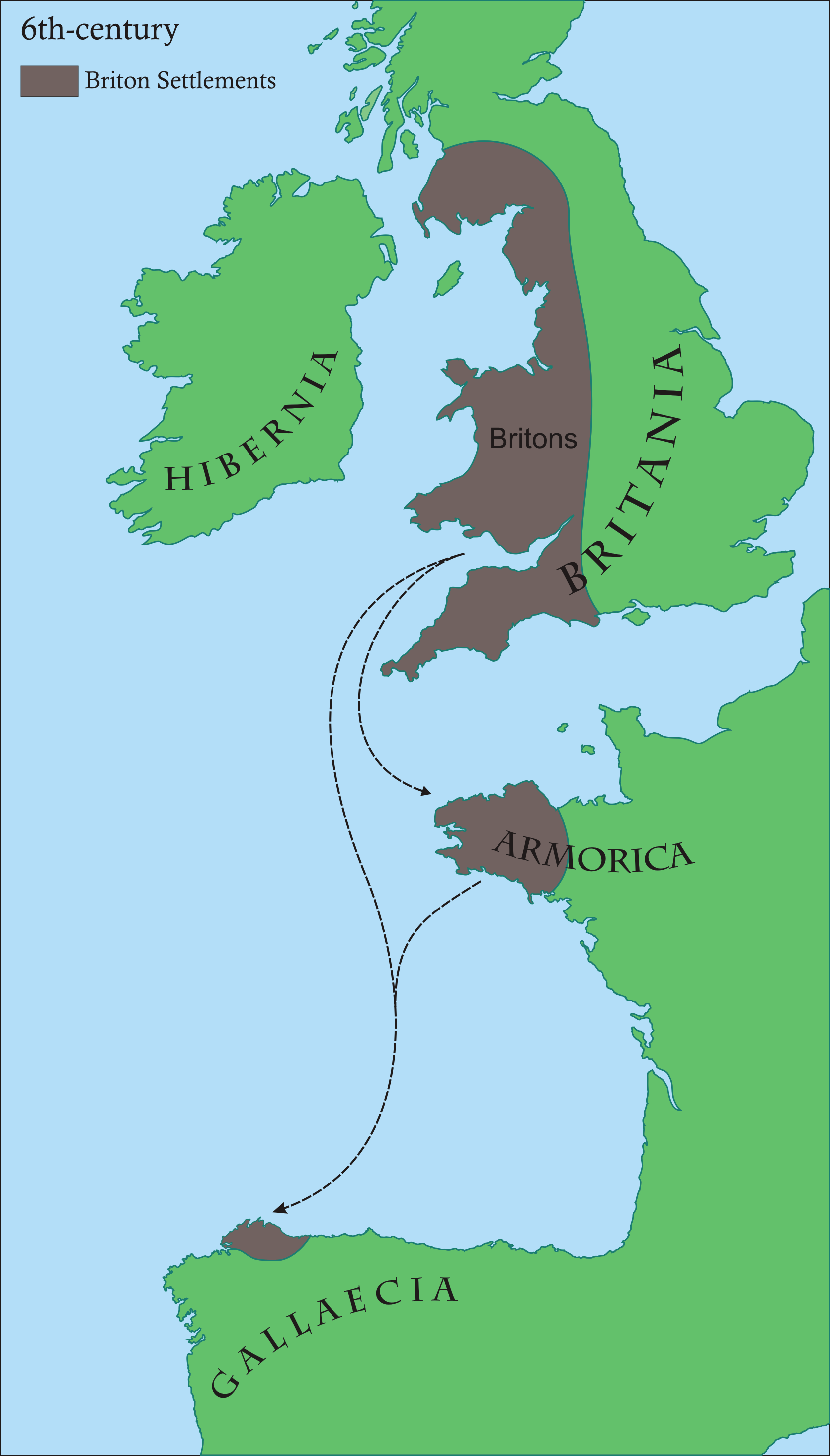
Map of Briton settlements in the 6th-century, including what became Brittany and Britonia (in Spain).

Pliny the Elder, in his Natural History (4.17.105), claims that Armorica was the older name for Aquitania stretching from the Loire to the Pyrenees. Taking into account the Gaulish origin of the name, that is perfectly correct and logical, as Aremorica is not a country name but a word that describes a type of geographical region, one that is by the sea.

Trade between Armorica and Britain, described by Diodorus Siculus and implied by Pliny, was long-established. Because, even after the campaign of Publius Crassus in 56 BC, continued resistance to Roman rule in Armorica was still being supported by Celtic aristocrats in Britain and Julius Caesar led two invasions of Britain, in 55 BC, and again in 54 BC, in response. Some hint of the complicated cultural web that bound Armorica and the Britanniae (the "Britains" of Pliny) is given by Caesar when he describes Diviciacus of the Suessiones as "the most powerful ruler in the whole of Gaul, who had control not only over a large area of this region but also of Britain". Archaeological sites along the south coast of England, notably at Hengistbury Head, show connections with Armorica as far east as the Solent. This 'prehistoric' connection of Cornwall and Brittany set the stage for the link that continued into the medieval era. Still farther East, however, the typical Continental connections of the Britannic coast were with the lower Seine valley instead.

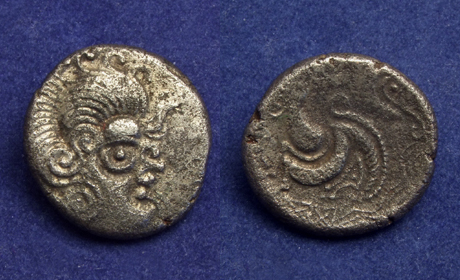
A Celtic stater made from billon alloy found in Armorica

Archaeology has not yet been as enlightening in Iron-Age Armorica as the coinage, which has been surveyed by Philip de Jersey.

Under the Roman Empire, Armorica was administered as part of the province of Gallia Lugdunensis, which had its capital in Lugdunum, (modern day Lyon). When the Roman provinces were reorganized in the 4th century, Armorica (Tractus Armoricanus et Nervicanus) was placed under the second and third divisions of Lugdunensis. After the legions retreated from Britannia (407 AD) the local elite there expelled the civilian magistrates in the following year; Armorica too rebelled in the 430s and again in the 440s, throwing out the ruling officials, as the Romano-Britons had done. At the Battle of the Catalaunian Plains in 451 a Roman coalition led by General Flavius Aetius and the Visigothic King Theodoric I clashed violently with the Hunnic alliance commanded by King Attila the Hun. Jordanes lists Aëtius' allies as including Armoricans and other Celtic or German tribes (Getica 36.191).

The "Armorican" peninsula came to be settled with Britons from Britain during the poorly documented period of the 5th–7th centuries. Even in distant Byzantium Procopius heard tales of migrations to the Frankish mainland from the island, largely legendary for him, of Brittia. These settlers, whether refugees or not, made the presence felt of their coherent groups in the naming of the westernmost, Atlantic-facing provinces of Armorica, Cornouaille ("Cornwall") and Domnonea ("Devon"). These settlements are associated with leaders like Saints Samson of Dol and Pol Aurelian, among the "founder saints" of Brittany.

The linguistic origins of Breton are clear: it is a Brythonic language descended from the Celtic British language, like Welsh and Cornish one of the Insular Celtic languages, brought by these migrating Britons. Still, questions of the relations between the Celtic cultures of Britain— Cornish and Welsh—and Celtic Breton are far from settled. Martin Henig (2003) suggests that in Armorica as in sub-Roman Britain:

There was a fair amount of creation of identity in the migration period. We know that the mixed, but largely British and Frankish population of Kent repackaged themselves as 'Jutes', and the largely British populations in the lands east of Dumnonia (Devon and Cornwall) seem to have ended up as 'West Saxons'. In western Armorica, the small élite which managed to impose an identity on the population happened to be British rather than 'Gallo-Roman' in origin, so they became Bretons. The process may have been essentially the same."

According to C. E. V. Nixon, the collapse of Roman power and the depredations of the Visigoths led Armorica to act "like a magnet to peasants, coloni, slaves and the hard-pressed" who deserted other Roman territories, further weakening them.

Vikings settled in the Cotentin peninsula and the lower Seine around Rouen in the ninth and early tenth centuries and, as these regions came to be known as Normandy, the name Armorica fell out of use in the area. With western Armorica having already evolved into Brittany, the east was recast from a Frankish viewpoint as the Breton March under a Frankish margrave.

== In popular culture ==
The home village of the fictional comic-book hero Asterix was located in Armorica during the Roman Republic; there, "indomitable Gauls" hold out against Rome. The unnamed village was reported as having been discovered by archaeologists in a spoof article in the British The Independent newspaper on April Fool's Day in 1993. The opening chapter of Finnegans Wake by James Joyce also refers to North Armorica.

== See also ==
- Breton language
- Jublains archeological site
- Saxon shore (Tractus armoricanus)
