= Plourin =

Plourin Plourin-Gwitalmeze
- Commune
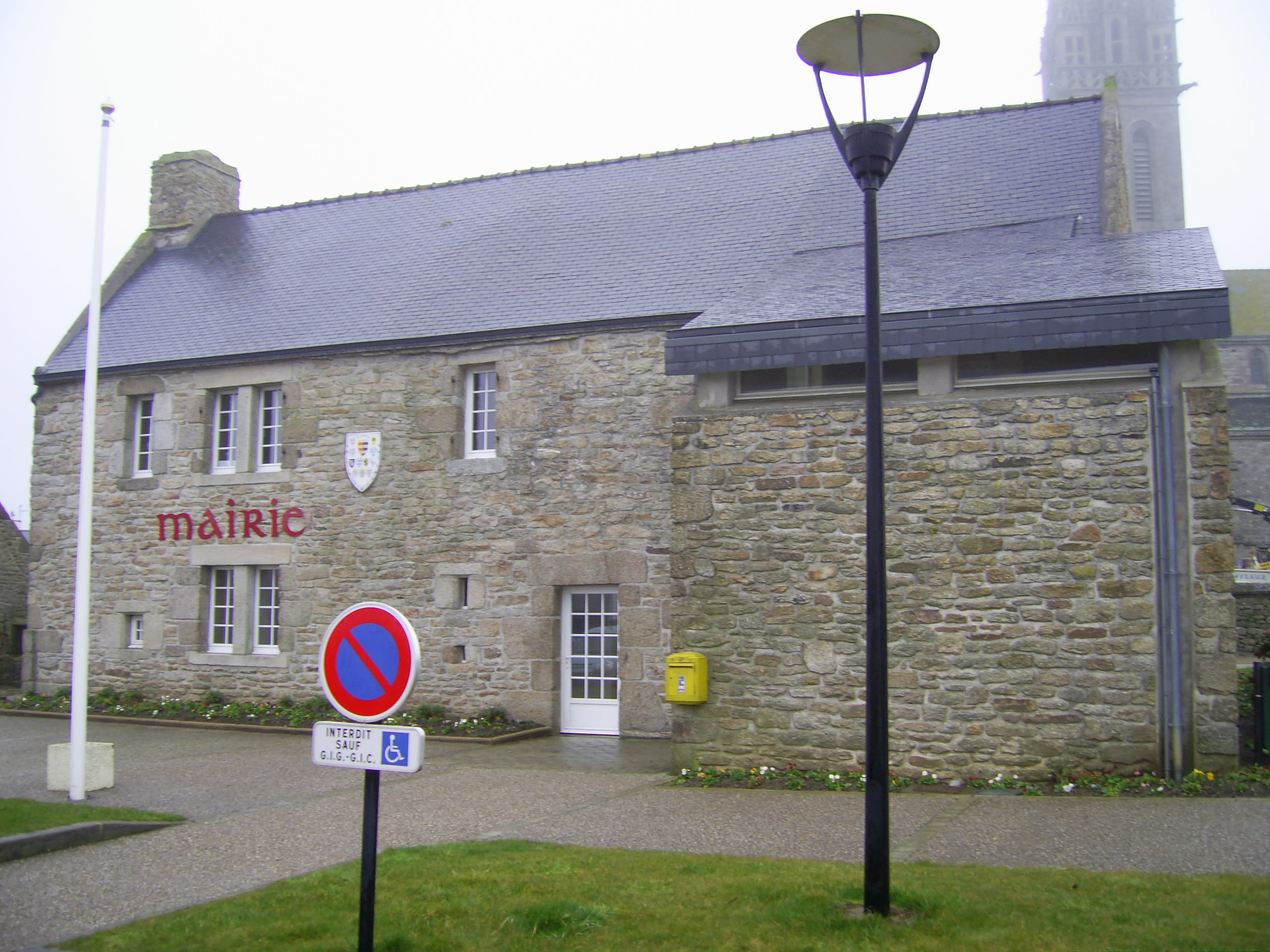
- The town hall in Plourin
- Location of Plourin
- Location within France Location within Brittany
- Coordinates: 48°30′37″N 4°41′03″W
- Country: France
- Region: Brittany
- Department: Finistère
- Arrondissement: Brest
- Canton: Saint-Renan
- Intercommunality: Pays d'Iroise

Government
  - Mayor (2026–32): Henri-Marc Payen
- Area^{1}: 25.69 km^{2} (9.92 sq mi)
- Highest elevation: 100 m (330 ft)
- Lowest elevation: 13 m (43 ft)
- Population (2023): 1,268
  - Density: 49.36/km^{2} (127.8/sq mi)
- Time zone: UTC+01:00 (CET)
  - Summer (DST): UTC+02:00 (CEST)
- INSEE/Postal code: 29208 /29830
- ^{1} French Land Register data, which excludes lakes, ponds, glaciers > 1 km^{2} (0.386 sq mi or 247 acres) and river estuaries.

Plourin (French pronunciation: [pluʁɛ̃]; Breton: Plourin-Gwitalmeze) is a commune in the Finistère department of Brittany in north-western France.

== Population ==
Historical population
Year	Pop.	±% p.a.
1968	978	—
1975	851	−1.97%
1982	889	+0.63%
1990	895	+0.08%
1999	983	+1.05%
2007	1,132	+1.78%
2012	1,228	+1.64%
2017	1,241	+0.21%
2023	1,268	+0.36%
Source: INSEE

Inhabitants of Plourin are called in French Plourinois.

== Geography ==
Plourin spans an area of 25.69 square kilometres (9.92 sq mi) and has a population of more than 1,250 inhabitants. It is located in the Pays de Léon, known for its distinctive rural landscapes. The commune is not coastal, despite its proximity to the sea, and features a bocage landscape with dispersed settlements comprising small hamlets and isolated farms.

The village center sits on a hill at an elevation of 72 meters, with the commune’s terrain ranging from 22 meters at its lowest point near the Portsall River to 94 meters at its highest in the southeastern corner. The Portsall River borders the east of the commune, while the Landunvez stream forms its western boundary.

Plourin is accessible by secondary roads, with the most significant route being the Departmental Road 68, which connects to Saint-Renan, Brest, and the coastal areas of Porspoder and Argenton. However, the village center is only directly served by the modest Departmental Road 28.

=== Neighboring Communes ===
Plourin shares borders with the following communes:

- Northeast: Ploudalmézeau
- East: Plouguin, Tréouergat
- Southeast: Lanrivoaré
- South: Brélès
- Southwest: Lanildut
- West: Porspoder
- Northwest: Landunvez

=== Climate ===
Plourin experiences an oceanic climate characterized by mild winters, cool summers, and frequent rainfall. The average annual temperature is approximately 12.1 °C (53.8 °F), and annual precipitation totals 997.1 millimetres (39.26 in) based on data from the nearby meteorological station in Ploudalmézeau. The commune is occasionally subject to strong coastal winds due to its proximity to the Atlantic Ocean.

== Urban Planning ==
Plourin is classified as a rural commune and is part of the Brest metropolitan area, categorized as a "crown commune" within the city’s sphere of influence. Despite its ties to Brest, the commune retains its rural character and has avoided significant urban sprawl or rurbanization.

=== Land Use ===
According to the Corine Land Cover database, agriculture dominates land use in Plourin, accounting for 96.3% of its area in 2018. The majority is arable land (50.8%), followed by mixed agricultural areas (33.9%) and pastures (11.5%). Urban areas cover just 1.8% of the commune, with forests occupying 2%.

== Toponymy ==
The name Plourin derives from the Breton word ploe (parish) and possibly rin (meaning "secret" or "arcane"), though some suggest it refers to an otherwise unknown saint named Rin. Variants of the name have appeared in historical documents as Ploerin (1330), Pleberin (14th century), and Plouerin Léon (1647).

== History ==
Plourin has a rich historical heritage, with archaeological evidence pointing to early settlements in the region. The village is associated with the legend of Saint Budoc, who is said to have brought Christianity to the area.

== Notable Features ==
- Historic Church: The parish church, dedicated to Saint Budoc, features architecture dating back to the 16th century.
- Town Hall: Housed in a renovated historic mansion, the town hall is an iconic structure in the village.
- Natural Landscape: The surrounding bocage offers picturesque views and reflects traditional agricultural practices.
- Pen Allan Garo: a historical site with preserved ancient buildings from a former agricultural demesne pre-18th century.

== Notable people ==
René Lannuzel, French missionary

== See also ==
- Communes of the Finistère department
