= Milizac =

Commune in Finistère, France

Milizac Milizag
- Part of Milizac-Guipronvel
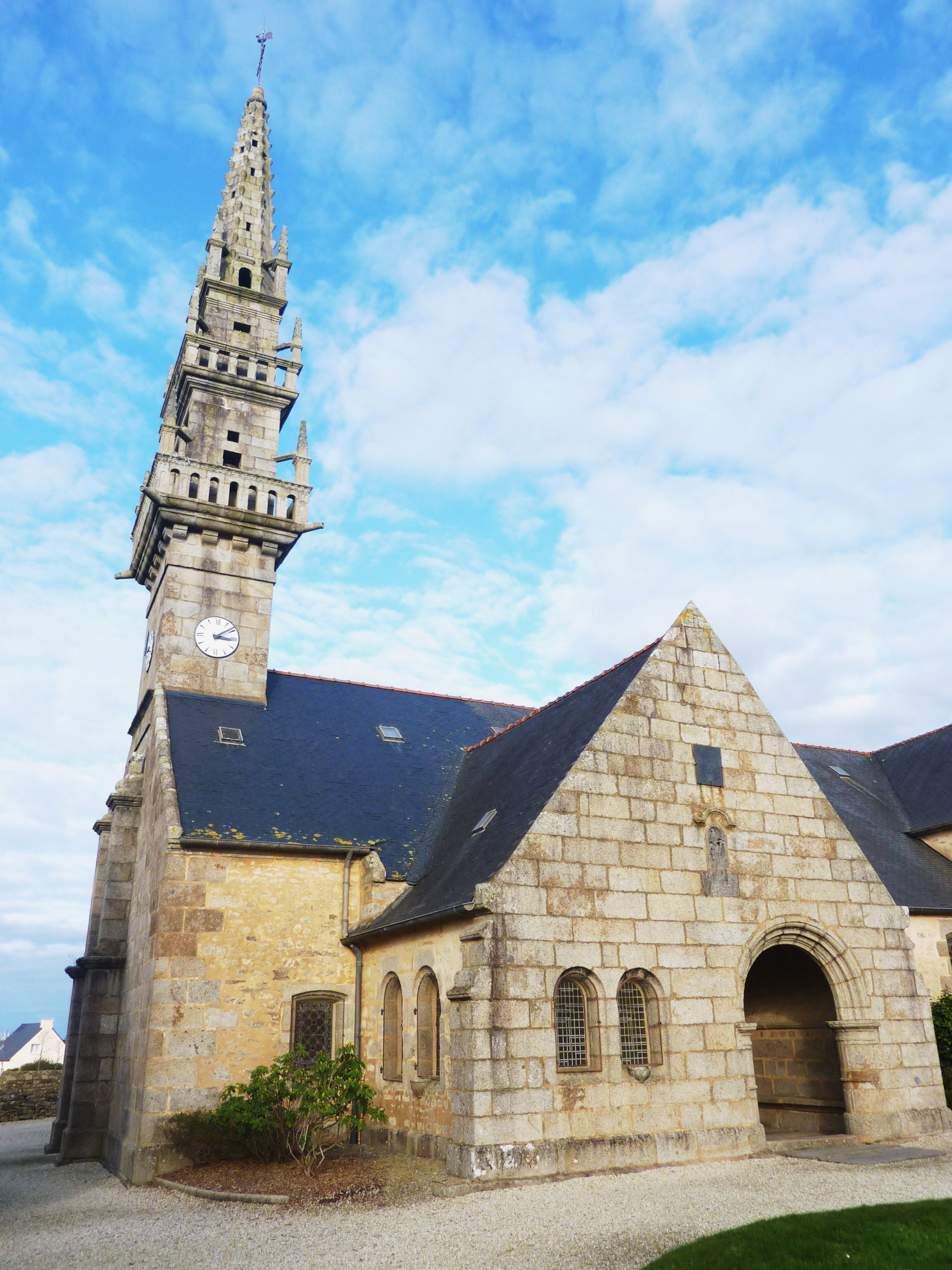
- The parish church in Milizac

- Coat of arms
- Location of Milizac
- Location within France Location within Brittany
- Coordinates: 48°28′06″N 4°34′00″W
- Country: France
- Region: Brittany
- Department: Finistère
- Arrondissement: Brest
- Canton: Saint-Renan
- Commune: Milizac-Guipronvel
- Area^{1}: 33.23 km^{2} (12.83 sq mi)
- Highest elevation: 101 m (331 ft)
- Lowest elevation: 32 m (105 ft)
- Population (2022): 3,923
  - Density: 118.1/km^{2} (305.8/sq mi)
- Time zone: UTC+01:00 (CET)
  - Summer (DST): UTC+02:00 (CEST)
- Postal code: 29290
- ^{1} French Land Register data, which excludes lakes, ponds, glaciers > 1 km^{2} (0.386 sq mi or 247 acres) and river estuaries.

Milizac (French pronunciation: [milizak]; Breton: Milizag) is a former commune in the Finistère department of Brittany in northwestern France. On 1 January 2017, it was merged into the new commune Milizac-Guipronvel. Milizac lies along the D38 road about halfway between Saint-Renan and Bourg-Blanc, 11.6 kilometres (7.2 mi) northwest of Brest. It contains a 17th-century parish church dedicated to Saint Anne, the Ecole Marcel Ayme, and a memorial dedicated to 95 local people who lost their lives in various wars.

== Geography ==
The former commune is spread over an area of 33.23 square kilometres (12.83 sq mi). Its elevation ranges from 32–101 metres (105–331 ft). The nearest larger towns are Guilers (5 km to the south) and Saint-Renan (6 km to the southwest). The village was once covered by thick forest in the wastelands of the moors and marshes. Vegetation consisted of gorse, broom and heather.

== History ==
The name Milizac has several other spellings, such as Milizac, Milisac, Milizag, Mélisac or Mélizag. It was the name of a Roman centurion who commanded a Gallo-Roman Military establishment (fundus militiacus) in Brittany.

The French Revolution was a disturbing time for the residents of Milizac. There were several significant events, such as the installation of the Municipal Assembly in 1789 and the first City Council meeting in 1790. Religious persecution occurred in 1791 and the Supplication of the Faithful to King Louis XVI in the following year. Signposts were changed to crosses and crucifixes in 1794 while the freedom of worship in the town and the Oath to the Municipality is dated to 1795.

In the mid-1870s, a local committee gathered to discuss surtaxes on alcohol and absinthe as the law which authorized the collection of the surtax ceased being in effect on 31 December 1873. A special resolution was recommended to extend the surtax as its proceeds were an important financial resource for Milizac. Without the surtax, the village could not fulfill its commitments or pay for the maintenance of the town hall, reconstruction of the boys' school, the restoration of the cemetery wall, and rural road improvements. Municipal advisers ruled in favor of the surtax system on 15 February 1874. The passed bill, in effect from January 1875 until 31 December 1879 inclusive, applied a surcharge of 20 fr. per hectolitre of pure alcohol in spirits and liqueurs as well as per hectolitre of absinthe.

During World War II the commune was under German occupation from 24 June 1940 until 27 August 1944. A total of 29 were killed in the town, including six Allied soldiers who were killed and buried in Milizac (five British and one Canadian). The streets and squares of the commune were given names on 16 January 1973. The official coat of arms for the commune was awarded on 22 January 1974.

== Coat of arms ==
Coat of Arms of Milizac

The municipal coat of arms is dated to the 17th century, representing the noble families of Kéranflec'h (1448) and Manor Curru (Roue Pharamus Kernezne from 1238 to 1689). It is mounted on two willow branches and the top of the shield bears the motto in Breton: War Atao Zao (Still standing). The left side of the coat of arms has three wavy bars in azure surmounted by two cockle shells commemorating an ancestor of the Kéranflec'h family having made the pilgrimage to the shrine of St. James of Compostella at Santiago de Compostela in Spain. A black lion with a golden crown adorns the right half.

== Landmarks ==
The 18th-century church is parish church dedicated to St Anne. The apse is decorated with stained glass depicting St Paul Aurelian and St Corentin of Quimper, patrons of the diocese. In the transept are two side altars. The aisles are separated from the nave by columns, connected by semicircular arches. The very slender tower has two galleries which surround the rooms with bells. On the corner of each gallery, a pinnacle is connected to the tower by a buttress. The four corner turrets are cantilevered over a molded cornice.

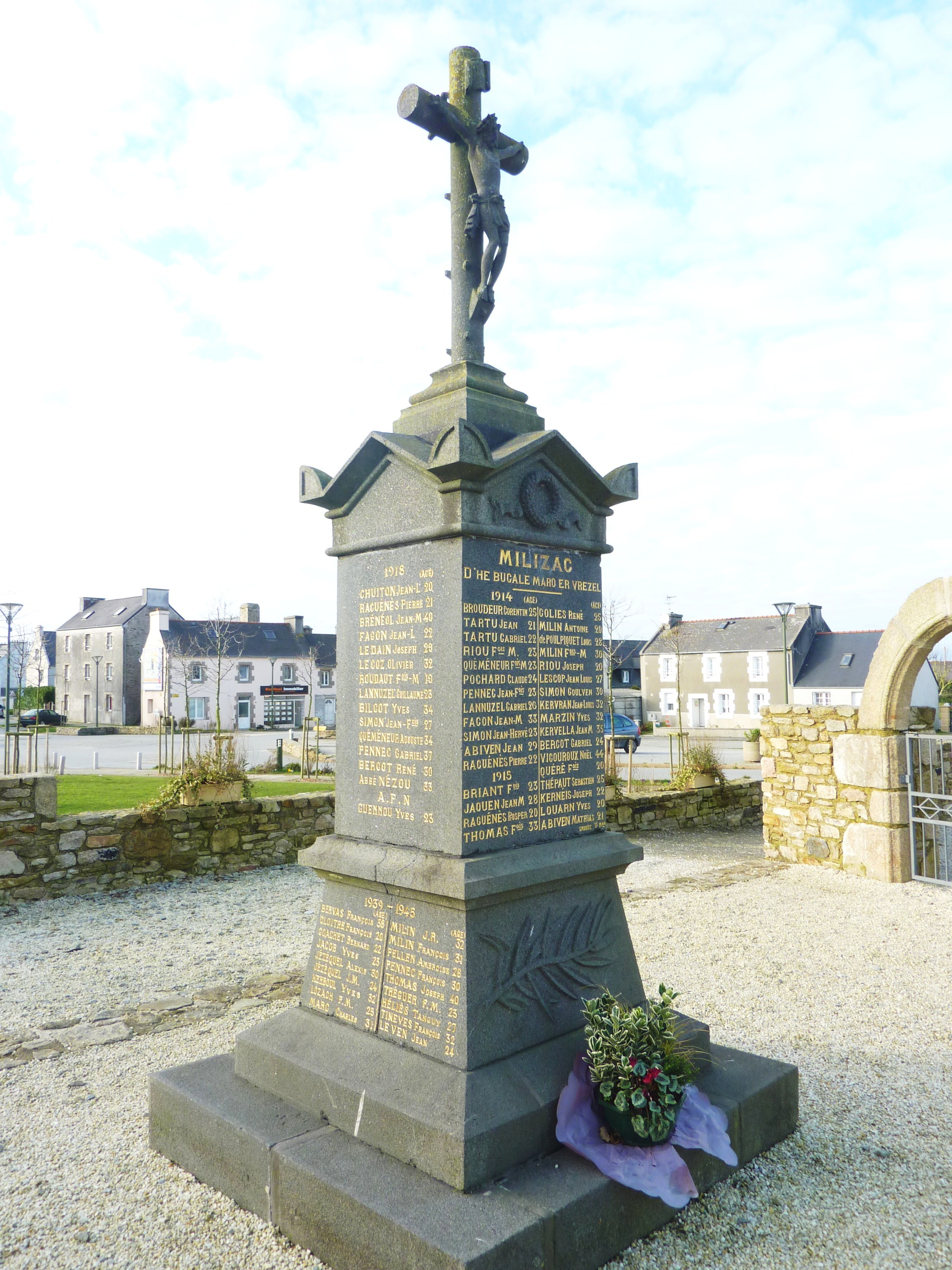
War monument

Other landmarks include the Ecole Marcel Ayme, the ruins of Faramus castle (also known as Curru, or Kurru castle) whose coat of arms included a silver lion crowned with gold, and a memorial dedicated to 95 people who lost their lives; 70 in World War I, 24 in World War II, and 1 in the Algerian War. Improvements to the public spaces in the town have been an issue of debate in the meetings of the town council held on 27 July 2011. Work commenced on the streets of General de Gaulle, Lamennais, Treg and Leon in August 2011, involving provision of footpaths, parking space, cycleway, road signs and traffic lights. The changes were due to be completed by December 2012.

== Population ==
Inhabitants of Milizac are called in French Milizacois and Milizacoises. There were 1,341 dwellings in the commune in 2012 out which 1,244 were principal residences.

Historical population
Year	Pop.	±%
1968	1,365	—
1975	1,727	+26.5%
1982	2,465	+42.7%
1990	2,925	+18.7%
1999	2,889	−1.2%
2007	2,952	+2.2%
2012	3,287	+11.3%
2022	3,923	+19.3%
Source: EHESS and INSEE (2007-2022)

== Breton language ==
The municipality launched a Breton linguistic plan through Ya d'ar brezhoneg on 31 May 2005. In 2008, 7.52% of primary-school children attended bilingual schools.

== Notable people ==
- Gabriel de Poulpiquet (1914–2013), politician

== See also ==
- Communes of the Finistère department
