= Ōpōtiki =

Town in the Bay of Plenty, New Zealand

- Minor urban area
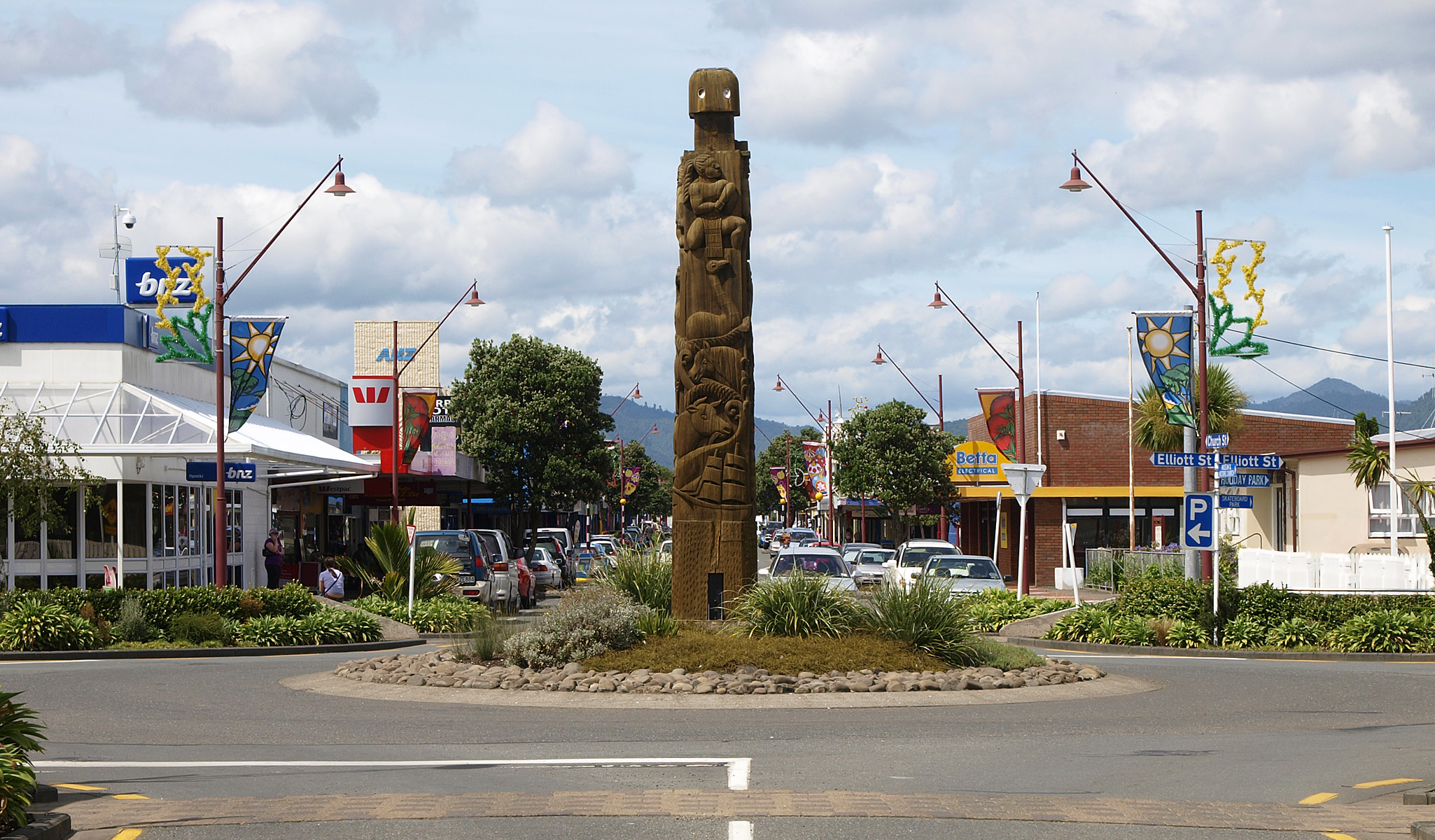
- Church Street, Ōpōtiki
- Interactive map of Ōpōtiki
- Coordinates: 38°00′15″S 177°17′14″E
- Country: New Zealand
- Region: Bay of Plenty
- Territorial authority: Ōpōtiki District
- Ward: Ōpōtiki Ward
- Electorates: East Cape; Waiariki (Māori)

Government
  - Territorial authority: Ōpōtiki District Council
  - Regional council: Bay of Plenty Regional Council
  - Mayor of Ōpōtiki: David Moore
  - East Cape MP: Dana Kirkpatrick
  - Waiariki MP: Rawiri Waititi

Area
  - Urban: 8.59 km^{2} (3.32 sq mi)

Population (June 2025)
  - Urban: 4,900
  - Urban density: 570/km^{2} (1,500/sq mi)
- Postcode(s): 3122
- Website: The council's site

Ōpōtiki (/ɔːpɔːˈtɪki/; from Ōpōtiki-Mai-Tawhiti) is a town in the eastern Bay of Plenty in the North Island of New Zealand. It houses the headquarters of the Ōpōtiki District Council, the mayor of Ōpōtiki and comes under the Bay of Plenty Regional Council.

== History ==
The place name, Ōpōtiki-mai-tawhiti, originally belonged to a pond on a hill east of the mouth of the Waiotahe River. It means "the place of Pōtiki from afar" and refers to Pōtiki-mai-tawhiti who is said to have come from Hawaiki to Aotearoa in pre-contact times. but came to be used for the wider region. The name subsequently came to be used for the region as a whole and was applied to the site of the settlement by the first European settlers in 1840.

In 1840, the New Zealand Church Missionary Society (CMS) established a station in Ōpōtiki. Ōpōtiki was the traditional centre of the Māori iwi (tribe) Te Whakatōhea. On 2 March 1865, CMS missionary Carl Völkner was killed by local Māori for acting as a spy for the New Zealand Government. In response to Völkner's death, the New Zealand Government dispatched military expeditions to Ōpotiki to hunt down his killers. Several local people were arrested, with some being executed. The Government also confiscated a large area of land stretching from Matatā to the east of Ōpōtiki from local Bay of Plenty tribes including Te Whakatōhea.

Military settlers settled in Ōpōtiki, which became the main government centre in eastern Bay of Plenty. By 1882, Ōpotiki had become a town district and subsequently became a borough in 1908. Between 1901 and 1936, the population rose from 627 to 1,437.

In 1964 a large flood damaged the town. A proposal was made to relocate the town to the Hukutaia Hills but instead the government chose to improve stopbanks. In 2024 the Opotiki District Council planned on using the fast-track legislation to intensify housing in the hills.

Ōpōtiki's economy was based on agriculture, becoming a bustling dairy town until the 1980s. During the 1980s, the town was adversely affected by economic reforms which led to the closure of two clothing factories in nearby Waimana and layoffs in the public works. Between 1996 and 2001, the population declined by 3.7%. During the early 21st century, the town's economy was boosted by the development of horticulture plantations and an offshore mussel farm.

By the 2020s, Ōpōtiki had developed a reputation nationally for its significant gang presence and their associated criminal activities. According to 1News, the three dominant gangs in Ōpōtiki are the Black Power chapter Mangu Kaha, the Ōpōtiki Mongrel Mob and the Mongrel Mob Barbarians. On 14 June 2023, a tangihanga (funeral) procession led to the temporary closure of several local schools and public transportation. This became a political issue with the Prime Minister, Chris Hipkins, commenting on it.

== Geography ==
The town of Ōpōtiki is situated exactly on latitude 38° South. The climate is temperate. Summer temperatures reach the mid-20s (Celsius, mid-70s Fahrenheit) on the coast and encourage a continuation of the beach culture of the Bay of Plenty. Winter days are often cloudless, the daytime temperature never drops below freezing but there may be a mild frost at night. Winter snow falls along the crest of the ranges, and on the higher peaks (over 1000 m) may remain for a few weeks. Rain occurs at any season. Severe localised rainstorms ('cloudbursts') may occur in the high country and have caused flash flooding including past inundations of Ōpōtiki township.

== Demographics ==
Stats NZ describes Ōpōtiki as a small urban area which covers 8.59 km^{2} (3.32 sq mi). It had an estimated population of 4,900 as of June 2025, with a population density of 570 people per km^{2}.

Historical population
Year	Pop.	±% p.a.
2006	4,443	—
2013	4,071	−1.24%
2018	4,791	+3.31%
2023	4,839	+0.20%
The 2006 population is for a larger area of 10.15 km^{2}. Source:

Ōpōtiki had a population of 4,839 in the 2023 New Zealand census, an increase of 48 people (1.0%) since the 2018 census, and an increase of 768 people (18.9%) since the 2013 census. There were 2,358 males, 2,472 females, and 12 people of other genders in 1,605 dwellings. 2.2% of people identified as LGBTIQ+. The median age was 35.0 years (compared with 38.1 years nationally). There were 1,164 people (24.1%) aged under 15 years, 957 (19.8%) aged 15 to 29, 1,902 (39.3%) aged 30 to 64, and 813 (16.8%) aged 65 or older.

People could identify as more than one ethnicity. The results were 46.6% European (Pākehā); 68.4% Māori; 5.3% Pasifika; 4.7% Asian; 0.3% Middle Eastern, Latin American and African New Zealanders (MELAA); and 1.3% other, which includes people giving their ethnicity as "New Zealander". English was spoken by 95.8%, Māori by 20.4%, Samoan by 0.5%, and other languages by 4.5%. No language could be spoken by 2.3% (e.g. too young to talk). New Zealand Sign Language was known by 0.8%. The percentage of people born overseas was 8.9, compared with 28.8% nationally.

Religious affiliations were 26.2% Christian, 0.7% Hindu, 0.2% Islam, 16.4% Māori religious beliefs, 0.2% Buddhist, 0.3% New Age, 0.1% Jewish, and 1.8% other religions. People who answered that they had no religion were 47.5%, and 7.3% of people did not answer the census question.

Of those at least 15 years old, 378 (10.3%) people had a bachelor's or higher degree, 2,076 (56.5%) had a post-high school certificate or diploma, and 1,227 (33.4%) people exclusively held high school qualifications. The median income was $31,100, compared with $41,500 nationally. 117 people (3.2%) earned over $100,000 compared to 12.1% nationally. The employment status of those at least 15 was 1,659 (45.1%) full-time, 366 (10.0%) part-time, and 237 (6.4%) unemployed.

Individual statistical areas
Name	Area (km^{2})	Population	Density (per km^{2})	Dwellings	Median age	Median income
Woodlands	2.85	1,053	369	405	47.5 years	$35,500
Ōpōtiki	5.74	3,786	660	1,200	31.8 years	$29,900
New Zealand					38.1 years	$41,500

== Amenities ==
=== Marae ===
Ōpōtiki contains three marae:

- Maromahue Marae and Te Poho o Kahungunu meeting house is a traditional meeting place of the Whakatōhea hapū of Te Ūpokorehe. In October 2020, the Government committed $364,597 from the Provincial Growth Fund to upgrade the marae, creating 16 jobs.
- Te Rere Marae and Te Iringa meeting house is a meeting place of the Whakatōhea hapū of Ngāti Ngahere. In October 2020, the Government committed $744,574 to upgrade it and two other marae, creating 30 jobs.
- Rongopopoia Marae, also known as Te Kahikatea Marae, is a meeting place of the Tūhoe hapū of Upokorehe.

=== Museum ===
Opotiki Heritage and Agricultural Society runs a museum in Ōpōtiki. It opened in 2001.

== Transport and infrastructure ==
Ōpōtiki is situated at the northern junction of State Highway 2 and State Highway 35. To the west, State Highway 2 connects Ōpotiki to Whakatāne, Rotorua and Tauranga. To the south and east, State Highway 2 provides a direct inland route to Gisborne, while State Highway 35 follows the coast via Te Araroa.

Coastal shipping used Opotiki Harbour until the mid-1960s. As of 2023, a project is underway to reconstruct the harbour, including the wharf and harbour entrance.

Horizon Networks owns and operates the electricity distribution network in Ōpōtiki, with electricity fed from Transpower's national grid at its Waiotahi substation.

Natural gas arrived in Ōpōtiki in 1984, as part of the construction of the Kawerau to Gisborne high-pressure pipeline. Today, First Gas owns and operates both the high-pressure pipeline and the local distribution network supplying the town.

== Education ==
Ōpōtiki College is a state high school for Year 9 to 13 students, with a roll of 350. It opened as Ōpōtiki District High School in 1922, and became Ōpōtiki College on its present site in 1953.

Ōpōtiki has three primary schools for Year 1 to 8 students: Opotiki School, established in 1873, with a roll of 318; Ashbrook School, established in 1859, with a roll of 67; and Woodlands School, established in 1921, with a roll of 177.

St Joseph's Catholic School is a state-integrated Catholic primary school for Year 1 to 8 students, with a roll of 150. The school started at a convent in 1890, and the current buildings date from 1920.

All these schools are co-educational. Rolls are as of July 2026.

== Notable people ==
- James Rolleston, an actor in Boy and Vodafone NZ advertisements, lives and was raised in Ōpōtiki.
- René Lannuzel, priest from Pen Allan Garo, Plourin who was posted in Ōpōtiki until his death. He is buried in Ōpōtiki.
- Sholto Kairakau Black, teacher and community leader

== Climate ==
Climate data for Opotiki (1991–2020)
Month	Jan	Feb	Mar	Apr	May	Jun	Jul	Aug	Sep	Oct	Nov	Dec	Year
Mean daily maximum °C (°F)	23.4 (74.1)	24.0 (75.2)	22.6 (72.7)	20.4 (68.7)	17.9 (64.2)	15.5 (59.9)	14.8 (58.6)	15.3 (59.5)	16.5 (61.7)	18.0 (64.4)	19.7 (67.5)	21.7 (71.1)	19.2 (66.5)
Daily mean °C (°F)	19.0 (66.2)	19.3 (66.7)	17.6 (63.7)	15.3 (59.5)	12.7 (54.9)	10.3 (50.5)	9.8 (49.6)	10.2 (50.4)	11.8 (53.2)	13.3 (55.9)	15.1 (59.2)	17.4 (63.3)	14.3 (57.8)
Mean daily minimum °C (°F)	14.6 (58.3)	14.7 (58.5)	12.6 (54.7)	10.3 (50.5)	7.6 (45.7)	5.2 (41.4)	4.8 (40.6)	5.1 (41.2)	7.1 (44.8)	8.5 (47.3)	10.6 (51.1)	13.1 (55.6)	9.5 (49.1)
Average rainfall mm (inches)	88.6 (3.49)	79.5 (3.13)	100.9 (3.97)	117.6 (4.63)	134.5 (5.30)	155.8 (6.13)	137.9 (5.43)	119.9 (4.72)	106.5 (4.19)	104.8 (4.13)	66.2 (2.61)	129.7 (5.11)	1,341.9 (52.84)
Mean monthly sunshine hours	244.0	202.1	182.2	188.3	143.1	118.3	151.0	154.4	153.1	192.8	188.3	215.2	2,132.8
Source: NIWA (sun 1981–2010)
