= Lampaul =

Lampaul (Breton: Lambaol), meaning the llan (church) of St Paulinus or Paul Aurelian, is the name of several places in Brittany, France:

- Lampaul, the principal settlement on the island of Ushant
- Lampaul-Guimiliau, west of Morlaix
- Lampaul-Ploudalmézeau, north west of Brest
- Lampaul-Plouarzel, west of Brest
