= Thomas Winterflood =

English cricketer

Personal information
- Full name: Thomas Winterflood
- Born: 20 July 1832; Lambeth, London, England
- Died: 20 February 1900 (aged 67); Brixton Hill, London, England
- Batting: Unknown
- Bowling: Unknown

Career statistics
| Competition | First-class |
|---|---|
| Matches | 1 |
| Runs scored | 0 |
| Batting average | – |
| 100s/50s | –/– |
| Top score | – |
| Balls bowled | 20 |
| Wickets | 0 |
| Bowling average | – |
| 5 wickets in innings | – |
| 10 wickets in match | – |
| Best bowling | – |
| Catches/stumpings | -/- |
- Source: Cricinfo, 22 December 2018

Thomas Winterflood (20 July 1832 – 20 February 1900) was an English first-class cricketer.

Winterflood was born at Lambeth in July 1832. He made one appearance in first-class cricket for the Surrey Club against the Marylebone Cricket Club at The Oval in 1866. He wasn't required to bat in the match and bowled five four-ball overs without taking a wicket. He died at Brixton Hill in February 1900.
