= Budoc =

Medieval bishop

Budoc of Dol
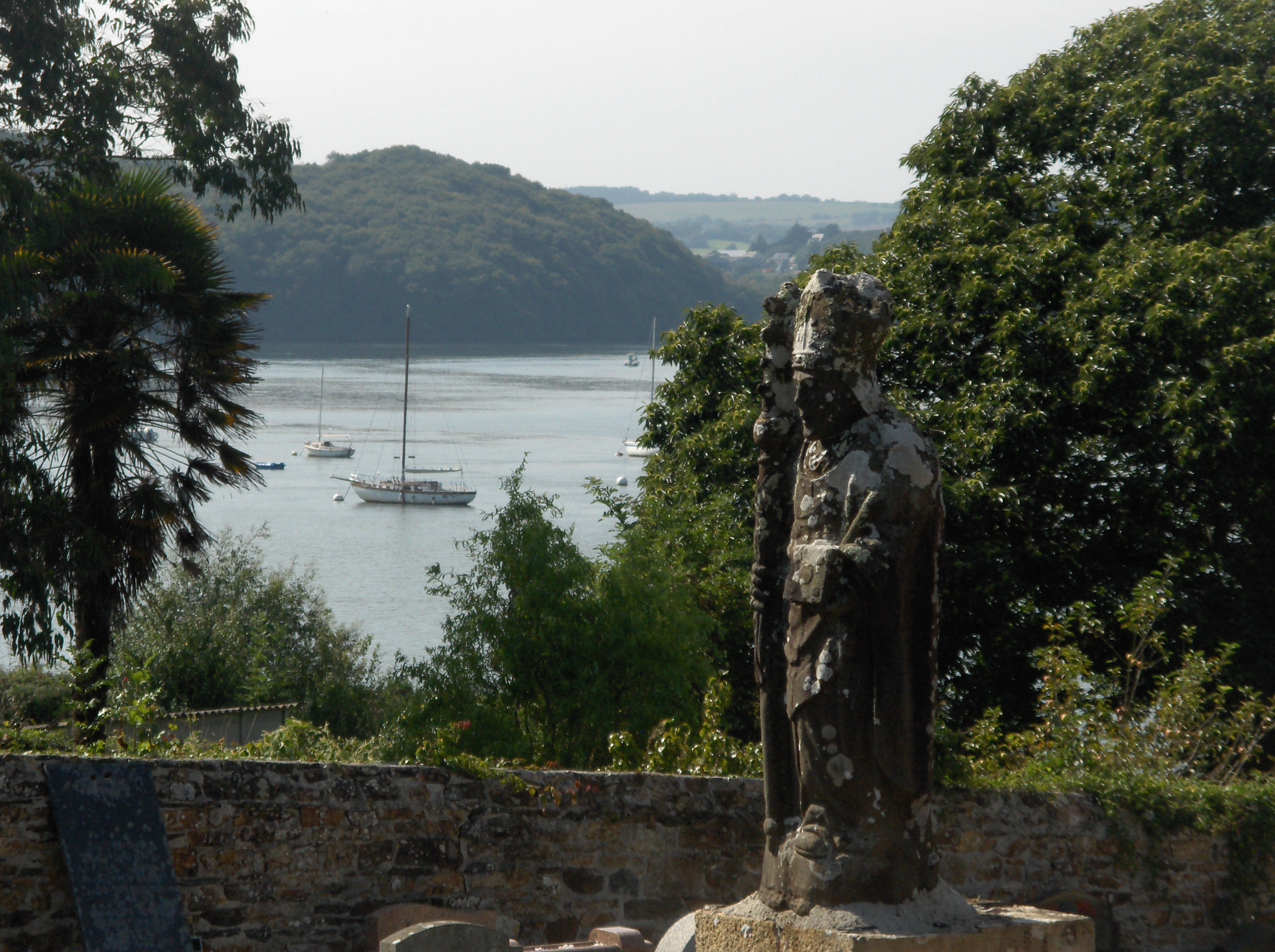
- Saint-Budoc near the church of Trégarvan, Finistère, Brittany, France

Abbot & Bishop
- Born: 5th century in a cask at sea off the coast of Ireland
- Died: 6th century Dol, Kingdom of Domnonée
- Venerated in: Catholic Church; Anglican Communion; Eastern Orthodoxy
- Major shrine: Plourin, Finistère, France
- Feast: 8 December (traditional); 9 December (Brittany)
- Patronage: Plourin, France; Plymouth, England, United Kingdom

Budoc of Dol (also Budeaux or Beuzec) was a 5th-century Breton monk and Bishop of Dol, who has been venerated since his death as a saint in both Brittany (in France) and Devon (in England). Budoc is the patron saint of Plourin in Finistère where his relics are preserved. His feast day was originally celebrated on 8 December, the date still used in Devon, but in Brittany this has been transferred to 9 December.

== Name ==
The name Budoc, or Beuzec, means "saved from the waters" from the Breton beuziñ meaning "drown"; but Baring-Gould finds this "fanciful". In old Celtic, boudi means "victory" and "profit".

== Life ==
Baring-Gould suggests that the princess Azenor fled Armorica with her young son due to dynastic conflict. Arriving first in Cornwall, they then proceeded to Ireland, where Budoc became a monk. They later returned to Brittany, landing at Porspoder near Brest.

Hagiographer G.H. Doble is of the opinion that Budoc was a once-famous abbot whose chief establishment was on the Breton coast. The vita by the monk Winwaloe describes Budoc as a teacher living on the island of Laurea. Later Budoc succeeded Samson of Dol and Magloire as bishop of Dol and ruled for 26 years (according to the 10th-century vita of Magloire and the 11th-century Chronicle of Dol). Baring-Gould distinguishes between the Abbot Budoc and the successor to Bishop Magloire at Dol.

== Legend ==
Budoc is reputed to have been a grandson of the legendary Count Even of Brest, Viscount of Léon. His mother, Princess Azenor, was falsely accused of infidelity by her jealous stepmother, which enraged her husband, the King of Goëlo, who ordered that the pregnant Azenor be thrown into the sea in a cask. (A tower of the Château de Brest is named for her.) Azenor invoked the help of Saint Brigid. The cask drifted for five months. Shortly after Azenor's baby was born, the cask washed ashore on the coast of Ireland. The story echoes Greek myth.

A villager who found the mother and newborn child summoned the abbot of Beau Port, near Waterford, and the child was christened the next day. Azenor became the washer-woman of the monastery, and Budoc was raised there. Azenor's stepmother fell ill, and upon her deathbed she recanted the evil lies she had spread. Azenor's husband then sailed in search of her, and, arriving in Ireland, the couple was reconciled, but both died before they could return to Brittany. (However, a tradition in Cornouaille has Azenor founding a religious establishment at Cap Sizun).

Growing up, Budoc studied at a monastery at Ardmore, thought to have been founded in the early 5th century by Declán of Ardmore, where he became a monk and later abbot. He eventually left Ireland, sailing in a stone trough that landed at Porspoder.

Two stained-glass windows in the chancel of Saint-Budoc Church in Porspoder depict scenes from the life of the saint.

At some unknown point, Budoc made his way to Dol, where he was named bishop of the region, possibly in connection with a monastery allegedly founded by Samson of Dol, whom he is believed to have succeeded as the local bishop.

== Budoc in Southwest England ==
Budoc is reputed to have sailed across the Plymouth Sound, until he found an inlet on the Devon side of the River Tamar. He landed in Budshead Creek, part of the present district of Plymouth called St Budeaux. His supposed activity suggests the foundation of an early church in Plymouth. However, there is no evidence of the name in Devon prior to the 16th century. There is also an ancient church said to have been dedicated by him at Budock in Cornwall, and there was once one in Oxford too.

Budoc's feastday is celebrated in Devon on 8 December.

== Troparion of Saint Budoc ==
Thou wast miraculously preserved from the ocean's fury
and, being sustained by the hand of God,
thou didst devote thyself to his service, O Hierarch Budoc.
Being showered with both temporal and spiritual honours both in Armagh and in Dol,
thou didst labour to win souls for Christ,
therefore we implore thine aid,
begging Christ our God that he will save our souls.

== See also ==
- List of Catholic saints
