= Guipronvel =

Commune in Finistère, France

Guipronvel Gwiproñvel
- Part of Milizac-Guipronvel
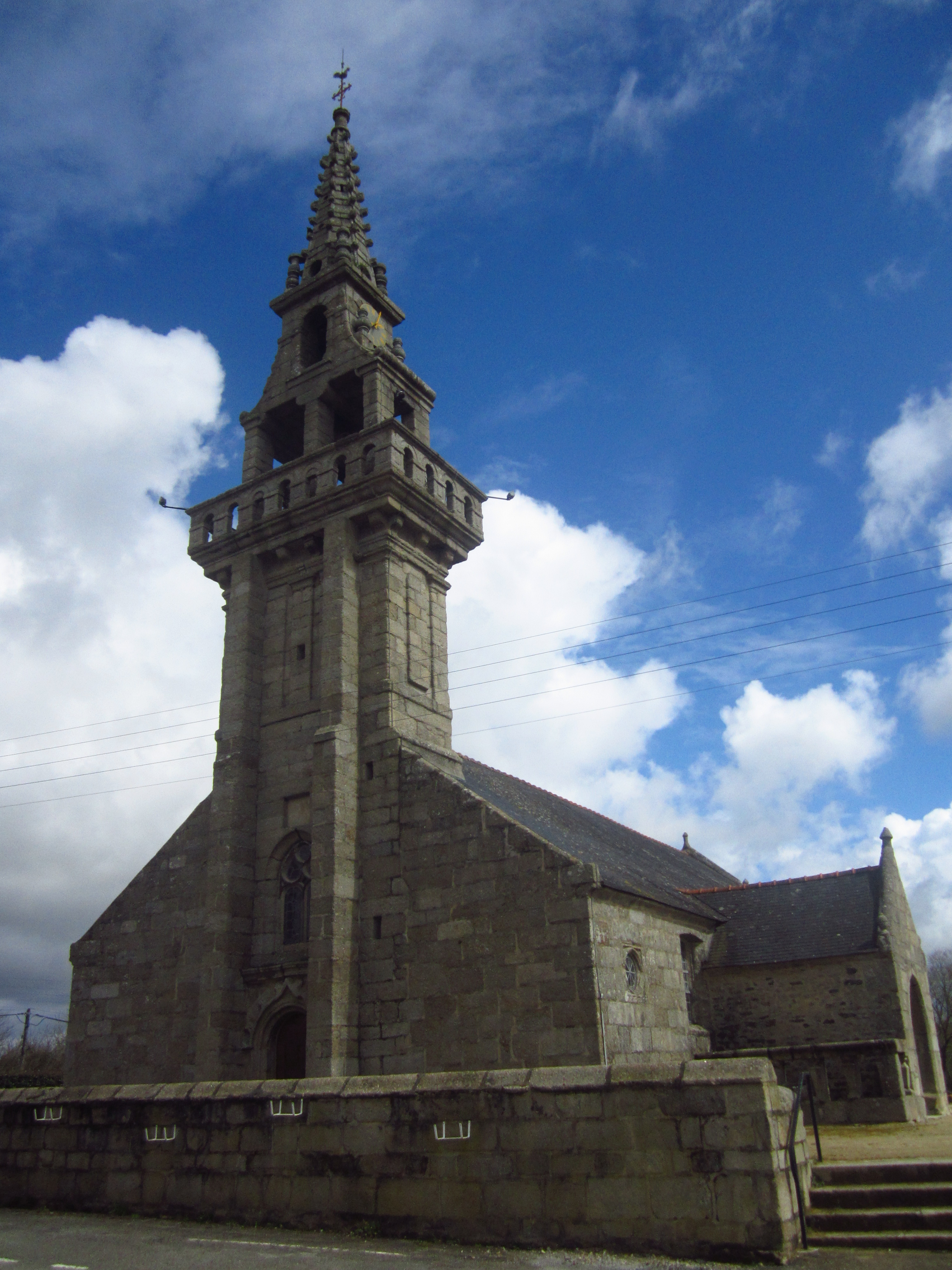
- The Church of Our Lady of Good News, in Guipronvel

- Coat of arms
- Location of Guipronvel
- Location within France Location within Brittany
- Coordinates: 48°29′28″N 4°34′23″W
- Country: France
- Region: Brittany
- Department: Finistère
- Arrondissement: Brest
- Canton: Saint-Renan
- Commune: Milizac-Guipronvel
- Area^{1}: 8.39 km^{2} (3.24 sq mi)
- Highest elevation: 90 m (300 ft)
- Lowest elevation: 23 m (75 ft)
- Population (2023): 822
  - Density: 98.0/km^{2} (254/sq mi)
- Time zone: UTC+01:00 (CET)
  - Summer (DST): UTC+02:00 (CEST)
- Postal code: 29290
- ^{1} French Land Register data, which excludes lakes, ponds, glaciers > 1 km^{2} (0.386 sq mi or 247 acres) and river estuaries.

Guipronvel (French pronunciation: [ɡipʁɔ̃vɛl]; Breton: Gwiproñvel) is a former commune in the Finistère department of Brittany in north-western France. On 1 January 2017, it was merged into the new commune Milizac-Guipronvel. Inhabitants of Guipronvel are called in French Guipronvélois.

== See also ==
- Communes of the Finistère department
