= François Chaslin =

French architect (1948–2025)

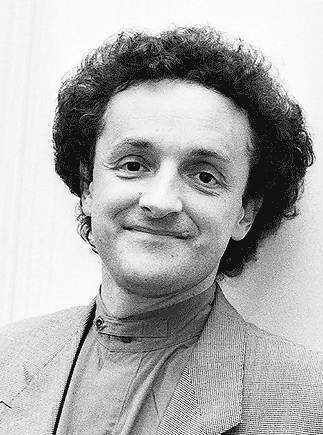
- Chaslin in 1990
- Born: 10 August 1948; Bollène, France
- Died: 7 August 2025 (aged 76); Lanildut, France
- Occupation: Architect

François Chaslin (French: [fʁɑ̃swa ʃɑlɛ̃]; 10 August 1948 – 7 August 2025) was a French architect.

== Life and career ==
Born in Bollène on 10 August 1948, Chaslin was the son of engineer Paul Chaslin. From 1980 to 1987, he led the expositions department at the Institut français d'architecture. From 1987 to 1994, he was editor-in-chief of the magazine L'Architecture d'Aujourd'hui and regularly contributed to Le Monde, Le Nouvel Observateur, and Libération. From 1999 to 2012, he directed and produced the weekly radio show Métropolitains on France Culture, which was also called Les Jeudis de l’architecture. He also taught at the École nationale supérieure d'architecture et de paysage de Lille and the École nationale supérieure d'architecture de Paris-Malaquais and was a corresponding member of the Institut de France and the Académie des Beaux-Arts. As an architecture critic, his study of Le Corbusier produced media criticism over the architect's association with the far right.

Chaslin died in Lanildut on 7 August 2025, at the age of 76.

== Publications ==
=== Articles ===
- "L’arche de Nouvel et les mythes du cargo" (2007)
- "Brume nette : le musée du Louvre-Lens" (2013)
- "Du fer, rien que du fer, mais que faire ?" (2013)

=== Books ===
- Les fontes ornées ou L'architecture des catalogues (1978)
- Pour une architecture urbaine : le concours des immeubles de ville de Cergy-Pontoise et les réflexions de François Chaslin, Paul Chemetov, Maurice Culot, Pierre Laconte, Bertrand Warnier (1982)
- Mario Botta 1978 - 1982 : laboratoire d'architecture (1982)
- Les Paris de François Mitterrand : Histoire des grands projets architecturaux (1985)
- La Grande Arche de La Défense (1989)
- Une haine monumentale : essai sur la destruction des villes en ex-Yougoslavie (1997)
- Henri Ciriani (1997)
- Deux conversations avec Rem Koolhaas, et cætera (2001)
- Jean Nouvel Critiques (2008)
- Paris/Carnet périphérique (2011)
- Un Corbusier (2015)
- Rococo ou Drôles d'oiseaux (divertissement) (2018)
