= Rusden =

Rusden is a surname. Notable people with the surname include:

== Brothers ==
- Francis Rusden (1811–1887), Australian politician and pastoralist
- George William Rusden (1819–1903), English-born Australian historian
- Thomas Rusden (1817–1882), Australian politician and pastoralist

== See also ==
- Rusden College, merged into Victoria College, Melbourne and now part of Deakin University
