= Quémènès =

Native name: Kemenez
- Aerial view of Quéménès
- Interactive map of Quémènès

Geography
- Location: Iroise Sea, Celtic Sea, North Atlantic Ocean
- Coordinates: 48°22′25″N 4°53′58″W
- Archipelago: Molène Archipelago
- Area: 0.3 km^{2} (0.12 sq mi)
- Length: 1.6 km (0.99 mi)
- Width: 0.4 km (0.25 mi)
- Coastline: 3.42 km (2.125 mi)
- Highest elevation: 13 m (43 ft)

Administration
- France
- Region: Brittany
- Department: Finistere
- Commune: Le Conquet

Demographics
- Population: 3 (2023)
- Languages: French

Additional information
- Time zone: CET (UTC+1)
  - Summer (DST): CEST (UTC+2)
- Official website: quemenes.bzh

Quémènès or Quemenes (French: Île de Quémènès [kemenɛs]; Breton: Kemenez) is an island in the Molène Archipelago in the Atlantic off Brittany, France. As of 2023, it has a population of 3. It is administered as part of the commune of Le Conquet, St-Renan Canton, Brest Arrondissement, in Finistère Department.

== History ==
In 1292, two sailors, one Norman and one Bayonnais, quarreled over who would draw water from a well on the island first. The dispute ended in murder, probably of the Norman, and other Norman and French sailors began to assault Aquitainian & English shipping and ports. This eventually escalated into the 1294–1303 Gascon War, which ended in a general return to the status quo but whose financing provoked a clerical crisis leading to the Avignon Papacy and whose settlement terms produced the marriage leading to the Hundred Years' War.

== Geography ==
Quémènès lies 2 nautical miles (3.7 km; 2.3 mi) from Molène, the chief island of the archipelago.
