= Metropolitan France =

Part of France geographically in Europe

Coordinates: 46°00′N 2°00′E

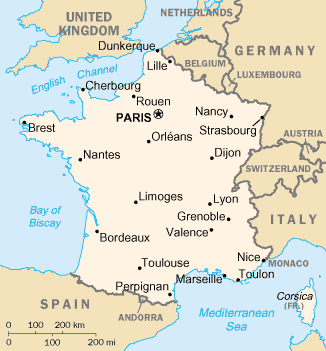
Map of metropolitan France

The European and overseas territories of France.

Metropolitan France (French: France métropolitaine or la Métropole), also known as European France (French: le territoire européen de la France), is the part of France geographically located in Europe. It consists of mainland France, popularly known as "the Hexagon" (French: France hexagonale or l'Hexagone), Corsica, and nearby French islands in the Atlantic Ocean, the English Channel, and the Mediterranean Sea.

This term is an official one and is used in everyday life in France but has no administrative meaning, as the overseas regions have the same administrative status as the metropolitan regions. However, only Metropolitan France is part of the Schengen Area. Its borders, especially in the east, changed significantly over the centuries but have remained largely unchanged since the independence of Algeria in 1962, with only minor adjustments, mainly to the border with Switzerland.

In contrast, overseas France (France d'outre-mer) is the collective name for the French departments and territories outside Europe. Together, metropolitan and overseas France form the French Republic. Metropolitan France accounts for 82.0% of the republic's land territory, 3.3% of its exclusive economic zone (EEZ), and 95.9% of its population. Some small parts of France, such as Cerdanya, are part of the Iberian Peninsula.

In overseas France, a person from metropolitan France is often called a métro, short for métropolitain.

== Etymology ==
The term "metropolitan France" dates from the country's colonial period (from the 16th to the 20th centuries), when France was referred to as la Métropole (literally "the Metropolis"), as distinguished from its colonies and protectorates, known as les colonies or l'Empire. Similar terms existed to describe other European colonial powers (e.g. "metropolitan Spain", España metropolitana). This application of the words "metropolis" and "metropolitan" came from Ancient Greek "metropolis" (from μήτηρ mētēr "mother" and πόλις pólis "city, town"), which was the name for a city-state that created colonies across the Mediterranean (e.g. Marseille was a colony of the city-state of Phocaea; therefore Phocaea was the "metropolis" of Marseille). By extension "metropolis" and "metropolitan" came to mean "motherland", a nation or country as opposed to its colonies overseas.

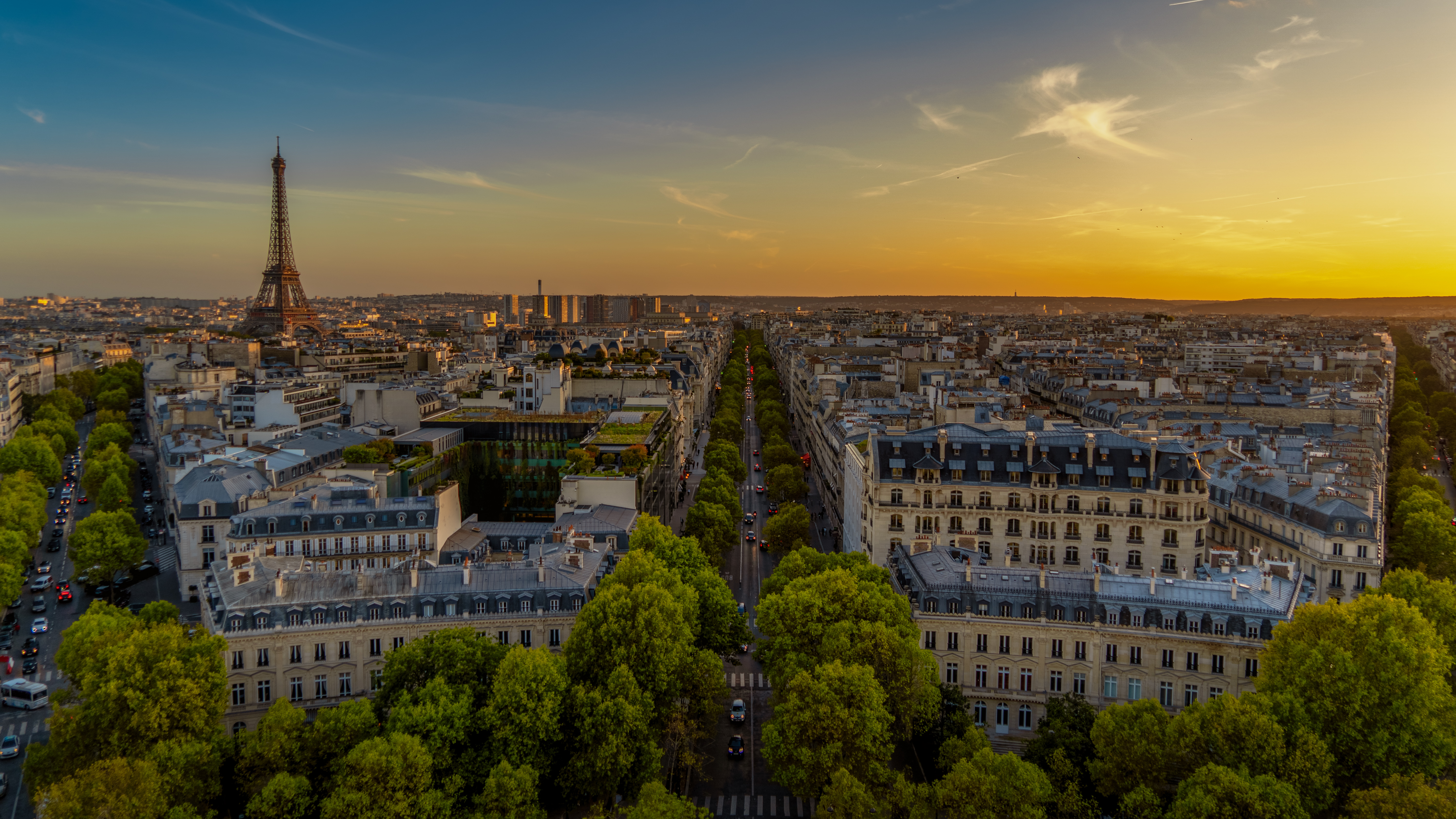
Paris, metropolitan France

Today, some people in Overseas France object to the use of the term la France métropolitaine due to its colonial history. They prefer to call it "the European territory of France", as the Treaties of the European Union do. Likewise, they oppose treating overseas France and metropolitan France as separate entities. For example, INSEE used to calculate its statistics (demography, economy, etc.) for metropolitan France only, and to analyze separate statistics for the overseas departments and territories. People in the overseas departments have opposed this separate treatment, arguing that the then four overseas departments were fully part of France.

As a result, since the end of the 1990s INSEE has included the four overseas departments in its figures for France (such as total population or GDP). The fifth overseas department, Mayotte, has been included in the figures for France since the mid-2010s too. INSEE refers to metropolitan France and the five overseas departments as la France entière ("the whole of France"). "The whole of France" includes the five overseas departments, but does not include the other overseas collectivities and territories that have more autonomy than the departments. Other branches of the French administration may have different definitions of what la France entière is. For example, in contrast to INSEE, when the Ministry of the Interior releases election results, they use the term la France entière to refer to the entire French Republic, including all of overseas France, and not just the five overseas departments.

Since INSEE now calculates statistics for la France entière, this practice has spread to international institutions. For instance, the French GDP published by the World Bank includes metropolitan France and the five overseas departments. The World Bank refers to this total as "France"; it does not use the phrase "the whole of France", as INSEE does.

== Statistics ==
Metropolitan France covers a land area of 543,940 km^{2} (210,020 sq mi), (Note: French Land Register data, which exclude lakes, ponds and glaciers larger than 1 km^{2} (0.39 sq mi) as well as the estuaries of rivers. French National Geographic Institute data, which includes bodies of water, gives a value of 551,695 km^{2} (213,011 sq mi) for the land area of metropolitan France.) while overseas France covers a land area of 119,396 km^{2} (46,099 sq mi), for a total of 663,336 km^{2} (256,115 sq mi) in the French Republic (excluding Adélie Land in Antarctica where sovereignty is suspended since the signing of the Antarctic Treaty in 1959). Thus, metropolitan France accounts for 82.0% of the French Republic's land territory.

At sea, the exclusive economic zone (EEZ) of metropolitan France covers 333,691 km^{2} (128,839 sq mi), while the EEZ of Overseas France covers 9,825,538 km^{2} (3,793,661 sq mi), for a total of 10,159,229 km^{2} (3,922,500 sq mi) in the French Republic (excluding Adélie Land). Thus, metropolitan France accounts for 3.3% of the French Republic's EEZ.

According to INSEE, 66,793,000 people lived in metropolitan France as of January 2026, while 2,891,000 lived in overseas France, for a total of 69,684,000 inhabitants in the French Republic. Thus, metropolitan France accounts for 95.9% of the French Republic's population.

In the second round of the 2022 French presidential election, 35,096,478 French people cast a ballot (meaning a turnout of 71.99%). 33,592,754 of these (95.72% of the total voters) cast their ballots in metropolitan France (turnout: 74.04%), 952,238 (2.71% of the total voters) cast their ballots in overseas France (turnout: 48.70%), and 551,486 (1.57% of the total voters) cast their ballots in foreign countries (French people living abroad; turnout: 38.62%).

The French National Assembly is made up of 577 deputies, 539 of whom (93.4% of the total) are elected in metropolitan France, 27 (4.7% of the total) in overseas France, and 11 (1.9% of the total) by French citizens living in foreign countries.

== Hexagon ==
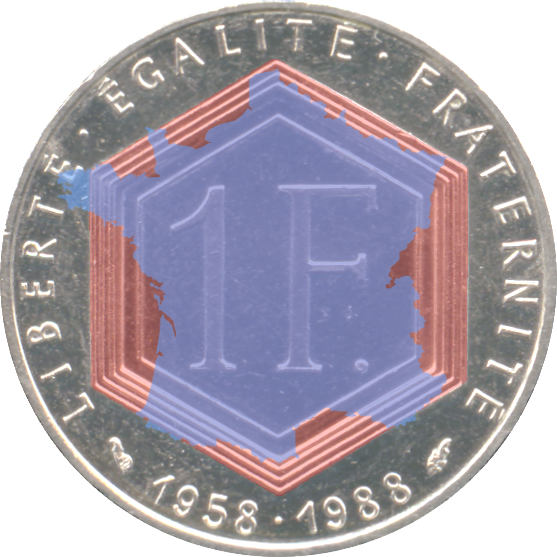
l'Hexagone illustrated by overlaying the outline of mainland France with a regular hexagon on the 1988 Charles de Gaulle commemorative 1 franc coin (celebrating the 30th anniversary of the Fifth Republic). Going counterclockwise from the northwest/top-left, the sides of the hexagon are: 1. the Channel coast, 2. the Atlantic coast, 3. the Pyrenees (border with Spain), 4. the Mediterranean coast, 5. the eastern border (Alps, Jura and Upper Rhine; Monaco to Karlsruhe), and 6. the northeastern border (German Rhineland, Belgium, and Luxembourg; Karlsruhe to Dunkirk).

Legislators in 2023 voted to use the name l'Hexagone ("the Hexagon") to refer to the continental part of metropolitan France in an effort to move away from colonial language. The image of France as a hexagon first appeared in French geography texts of the 1850s. At the "vertices" of the hexagon are the communes of Bray-Dunes, Porspoder, Hendaye, Cerbère, Menton and Lauterbourg.

Mainland or Continental France (French: la France continentale), or just "the mainland" (French: le continent), does not include the French islands in the Atlantic Ocean, English Channel, or Mediterranean Sea, the largest of which is Corsica. In Corsica, people from mainland France are referred to as les continentaux.

== See also ==
- Territorial evolution of France
- French colonial empire
- Mainland
