= Molène =

Île-Molène Molenez
- Commune
- Aerial view of Molène
- Location of Île-Molène
- Location within France Location within Brittany
- Coordinates: 48°23′50″N 4°57′20″W
- Country: France
- Region: Brittany
- Department: Finistère
- Arrondissement: Brest
- Canton: Saint-Renan
- Intercommunality: Pays d'Iroise

Government
  - Mayor (2020–2026): Didier Delhalle
- Area^{1}: 0.75 km^{2} (0.29 sq mi)
- Highest elevation: 26 m (85 ft)
- Lowest elevation: 0 m (0 ft)
- Population (2020): 162
  - Density: 220/km^{2} (560/sq mi)
- Time zone: UTC+01:00 (CET)
  - Summer (DST): UTC+02:00 (CEST)
- INSEE/Postal code: 29084 /29259
- ^{1} French Land Register data, which excludes lakes, ponds, glaciers > 1 km^{2} (0.386 sq mi or 247 acres) and river estuaries.

Molène or Molene (French: Île-Molène; Breton: Molenez, "Bald Island") is an island in the Atlantic off the west coast of Brittany in northwestern France. It is the largest of Molène or Molene Archipelago (Archipel de Molène), a group of about 20 islands in the Ponant Isles. an archipelago of twenty islands.

It is the seat of Île-Molène, a commune in Saint-Renan Canton, Brest Arrondissement, Finistère Department.

== Geography ==
The island is small, less than 1 by 0.9 km (0.56 mi), and covers under 75 hectares (190 acres) of non-foreshore land. The community and port are on the east side, opposite a tiny tidal island, the Lédénes of Molène. The area is proverbially dangerous for sailors to navigate, with one Breton rhyme being "Qui voit Molène voit sa peine. Qui voit Ouessant voit son sang. Qui voit Sein voit sa fin. Qui voit Groix voit sa croix." ("He who sees Molène sees his pain. He who sees Ushant sees his blood. He who sees Sein sees his end. He who sees Groix sees his cross").

The archipelago includes Ushant, Quémènès, Île Verte, and Île de Sein.

== Population ==
Historical population
Year	Pop.	±% p.a.
1968	527	—
1975	397	−3.97%
1982	330	−2.61%
1990	277	−2.16%
1999	264	−0.53%
2007	217	−2.42%
2012	186	−3.04%
2017	141	−5.39%
2023	176	+3.76%
Source: INSEE

The number of permanent residents has fallen in recent decades, but Molène remains inhabited, with a permanent population of 162 as of 2020. In French, an inhabitants of Île-Molène is called a Molénais.

== Amenities ==
The island's electricity is produced by a small diesel generator. Potable water supplies are from rainwater catchment, with each household additionally maintaining its own cistern.

A local delicacy is Molène sausage, which has the distinction of being smoked with seaweed.

== See also ==
- Communes of the Finistère department
- Parc naturel régional d'Armorique
