= Edward Petherick =

Australian businessman

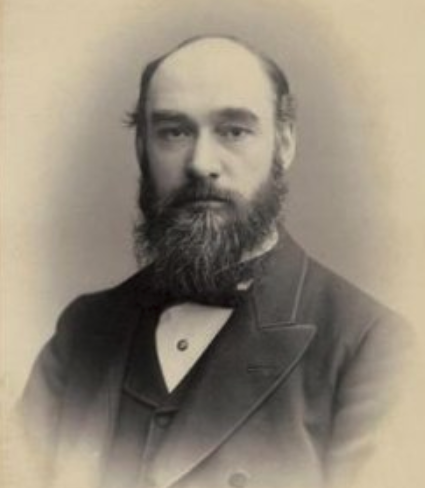
- Born: March 16, 1847
- Died: September 17, 1917 (aged 70)
- Occupations: Bookseller and writer
- Writing career
- Genre: Bibliographies
- Subjects: Colonisation, Australia,

Edward Augustus Petherick CMG (6 March 1847 – 17 September 1917) was a prominent Australian bookseller, book collector, bibliographer, publisher and archivist, whose collection became the basis of the Australiana section of the then Commonwealth National Library, now the National Library of Australia.

== Career ==
Petherick was born in England and moved with his family to Australia when he was five years old. He was employed by the bookseller George Robertson from 1862, travelling to London in 1870 as a buyer. In addition to his work for Robertson, Petherick was privately engaged in compiling a bibliography of Australian and Pacific material. With his contacts in the book trade Petherick soon began collecting books on Australia and the Pacific and building a collection which would later be known as the Petherick Collection.

By 1886 Petherick was living in Brixton Hill and working on the catalogue of the York Gate Library, which was published that year as Catalogue of the York Gate Library formed by Mr S. William Silver: An Index to the Literature of Geography, Maritime and Inland Discovery, Commerce and Colonisation.

In the same year Petherick purchased a large group of the papers and letters of Sir Joseph Banks at a Sotherby's auction: most of these now form part of the National Library of Australia's Petherick Collection.

In 1887, Petherick set up the Colonial Booksellers' Agency in London and also started a publishing programme, with book series such as "Petherick's Collection of Favourite and Approved Authors" and "Petherick's Collection of Popular European Authors". However, by 1894 he was bankrupt. Assistance from family and friends, however, enabled Petherick to preserve his extensive private collection.

The Australian historian George William Rusden was a frequent visitor to Petherick and his library at Petherick's home "Yarra Yarra" on Brixton Hill, even staying for weeks when Rusden was working on his book History of Australia.

During the next 17 years Petherick tried to interest the Commonwealth of Australia in buying his collection. While never in doubt about its significance, the Commonwealth found itself in a difficult position. Petherick had made it a condition that the Commonwealth Parliamentary Library employ him to continue his monumental bibliography, the Bibliography of Australia and Polynesia (which would remain unpublished at his death). Aged in his early sixties, Petherick was considered too old to be employed by the Australian Public Service. Finally, in 1909 the committee of the then Commonwealth Parliamentary Library purchased Petherick's collection and in 1911 the Commonwealth of Australia passed the Petherick Act, enabling the Commonwealth Parliamentary Library to employ Petherick as Archivist for an annuity of £500.

== Legacy ==
Petherick's collection purchased by the Commonwealth of Australia is now located in the National Library of Australia, Canberra and is known as the Petherick Collection. It comprises "some 10,000 volumes and 6,500 pamphlets, maps, manuscripts and pictures relating to Australia and the Pacific area".

There is a Petherick Reading Room in the National Library of Australia which is the only reading room in that library named after an individual.
