= Bertie Joyce =

Albert Edward Joyce
- Born: Albert Edward Joyce; December 29, 1921; Brixton Hill, London, United Kingdom
- Died: June 12, 1943 (aged 21); Stalag Luft III, Żagań, Poland
- Military career
- Allegiance: United Kingdom
- Branch: Royal Air Force
- Rank: Flight Sergeant
- Nickname: Bertie Joyce
- Unit: No. 234 Squadron RAF
- Conflicts: World War II: Operation Veracity I

Albert Edward Joyce, known as "Sergeant Bertie Joyce" (29 December 1921 – 12 June 1943), was a Royal Air Force pilot who served during World War II.

== Early life ==
Albert Edward Joyce was born on 29 December 1921 in Brixton Hill, London, United Kingdom, the son of Alfred Thomas Joyce and Jane Joyce. He pursued an interest in boxing during his youth.

== World War II ==
=== Operation Veracity I ===
On 30 December 1941, Flight Sergeant Joyce participated in Operation Veracity I, an Allied operation to bomb the port of Brest. His Supermarine Spitfire of No. 234 Squadron RAF was shot down over Plourin. Joyce successfully bailed out but sustained injuries during his parachute descent. He subsequently sought shelter at the Pen Allan Garo farm.

=== Capture by German forces ===
The region was under German occupation at the time. A Wehrmacht soldier arrived at Pen Allan Garo farm shortly after the aircraft crash. According to contemporary accounts, Joyce burned his identification papers and made the sign of the cross, believing his execution was imminent. The Wehrmacht soldier arranged Joyce's transport to a nearby road, where he was collected by German military personnel and taken into custody as a prisoner of war.

=== Escape attempt and death ===
Joyce was subsequently transferred to Stalag Luft III, a prisoner-of-war camp in Żagań, Poland. In February 1943, he attempted to escape alongside fellow prisoner Alan Saxton. The attempt failed when a guard spotted them in a searchlight beam and immediately opened fire with an automatic rifle, severely wounding Joyce. He was transferred to hospital but died from his injuries three months later in June 1943.

Saxton, a Warrant Officer with No. 214 Squadron RAF, who had been captured in October 1941, survived the encounter uninjured, though he never forgot his dear friend, Joyce.

Following the failed breakout, Saxton was transferred to Stalag Luft VI (Heydekrug) in June 1943, where master escape logs record his participation in further underground tunneling operations.

== Legacy ==
Joyce's story was rediscovered through research conducted by local historian Gildas Saouzanet and a 2015 visit by Joyce's family, the Bowles. The family retraced Joyce's final movements, visiting the locations where he took refuge and was apprehended. At Pen Allan Garo, local testimony and archaeological investigation recovered fragments of Joyce's Spitfire wreckage.
