= Milizac-Guipronvel =

- Commune
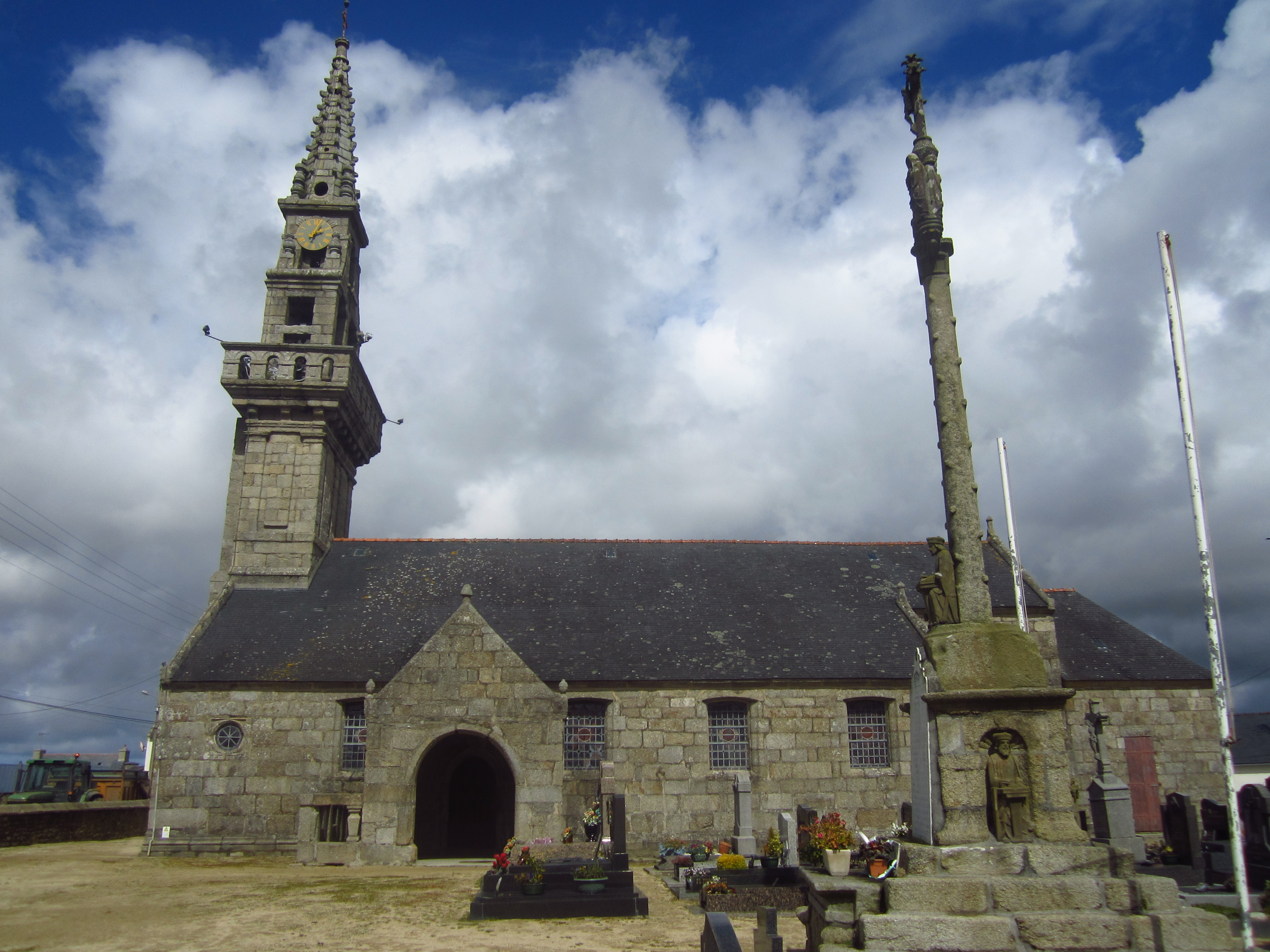
- The church of Guipronvel
- Location of Milizac-Guipronvel
- Location within France Location within Brittany
- Coordinates: 48°29′28″N 4°34′23″W
- Country: France
- Region: Brittany
- Department: Finistère
- Arrondissement: Brest
- Canton: Saint-Renan
- Intercommunality: Pays d'Iroise

Government
  - Mayor (2020–2026): Bernard Quillévéré
- Area^{1}: 41.62 km^{2} (16.07 sq mi)
- Population (2023): 4,816
  - Density: 115.7/km^{2} (299.7/sq mi)
- Time zone: UTC+01:00 (CET)
  - Summer (DST): UTC+02:00 (CEST)
- INSEE/Postal code: 29076 /29290
- ^{1} French Land Register data, which excludes lakes, ponds, glaciers > 1 km^{2} (0.386 sq mi or 247 acres) and river estuaries.

Milizac-Guipronvel (French pronunciation: [milizak ɡipʁɔ̃vɛl]; Breton: Milizag-Gwiproñvel) is a commune in the department of Finistère, western France. The municipality was established on 1 January 2017 by merger of the former communes of Guipronvel (the seat) and Milizac.

== Population ==
Population data refer to the commune in its geography as of January 2025.

Historical population
| Year | Pop. | ±% p.a. |
|---|---|---|
| 1968 | 1,727 | — |
| 1975 | 2,112 | +2.92% |
| 1982 | 2,987 | +5.08% |
| 1990 | 3,495 | +1.98% |
| 1999 | 3,493 | −0.01% |
| 2007 | 3,650 | +0.55% |
| 2012 | 4,073 | +2.22% |
| 2017 | 4,478 | +1.91% |
| 2023 | 4,816 | +1.22% |
Source: INSEE

== See also ==
- Communes of the Finistère department
