= Ploumoguer =

Ploumoguer Ploñger
- Commune
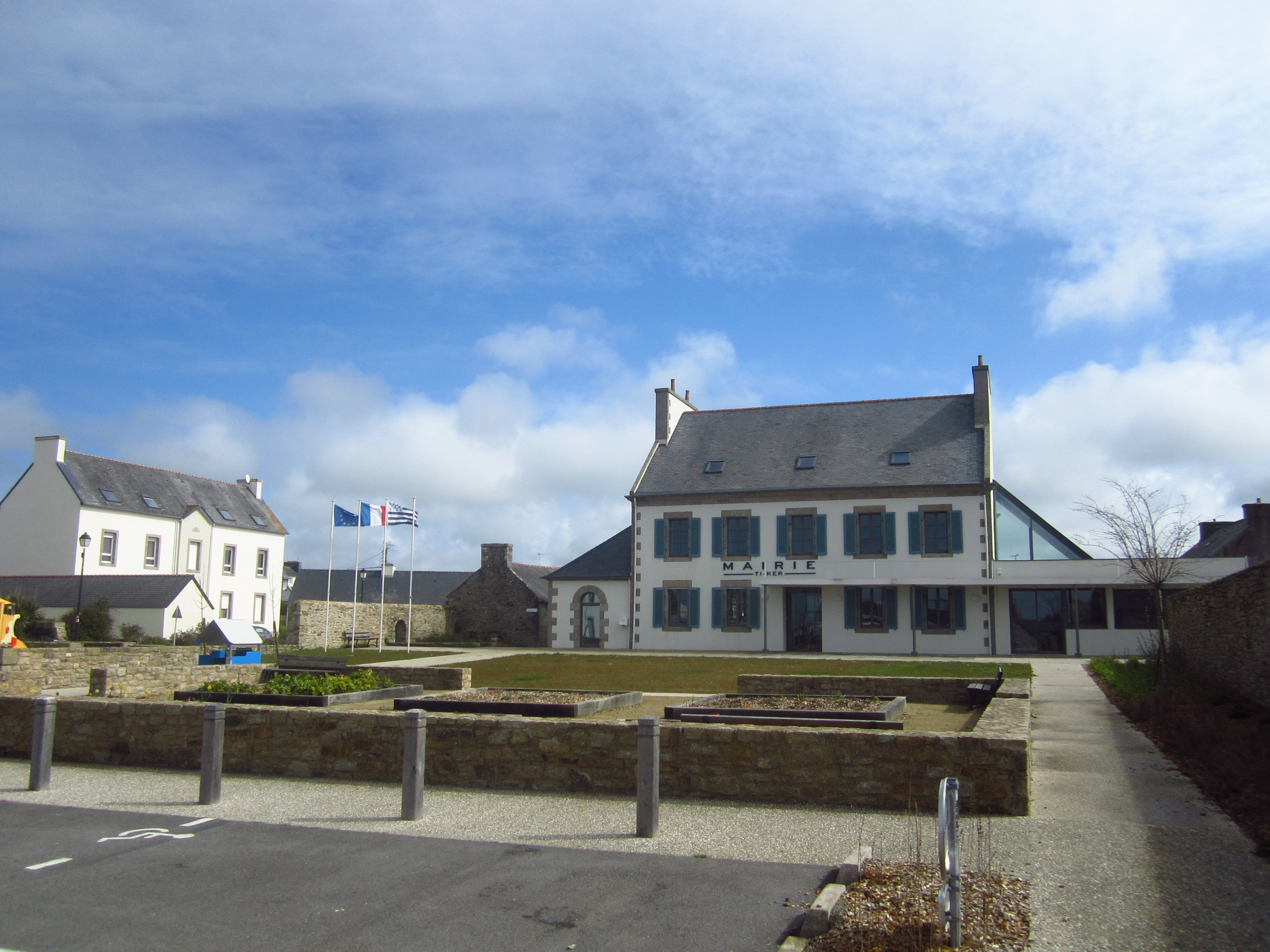
- The town hall in Ploumoguer

- Coat of arms
- Location of Ploumoguer
- Location within France Location within Brittany
- Coordinates: 48°24′12″N 4°43′19″W
- Country: France
- Region: Brittany
- Department: Finistère
- Arrondissement: Brest
- Canton: Saint-Renan
- Intercommunality: Pays d'Iroise

Government
  - Mayor (2022–2026): Gisèle Cariou
- Area^{1}: 38.93 km^{2} (15.03 sq mi)
- Highest elevation: 141 m (463 ft)
- Lowest elevation: 0 m (0 ft)
- Population (2023): 2,074
  - Density: 53.28/km^{2} (138.0/sq mi)
- Time zone: UTC+01:00 (CET)
  - Summer (DST): UTC+02:00 (CEST)
- INSEE/Postal code: 29201 /29810
- ^{1} French Land Register data, which excludes lakes, ponds, glaciers > 1 km^{2} (0.386 sq mi or 247 acres) and river estuaries.

Ploumoguer (French pronunciation: [plumɔɡɛʁ]; Breton: Ploñger) is a commune in the Finistère department of Brittany in north-western France.

== Population ==
Inhabitants of Ploumoguer are called in French Ploumoguérois.

Historical population

Year	Pop.	±% p.a.
1793	1,420	—
1821	1,820	+0.89%
1841	1,888	+0.18%
1861	1,904	+0.04%
1881	1,886	−0.05%
1901	1,890	+0.01%
1911	1,932	+0.22%
1926	1,856	−0.27%
1936	1,743	−0.63%
1946	1,742	−0.01%
1954	1,678	−0.47%

Year	Pop.	±% p.a.
1962	1,562	−0.89%
1968	1,475	−0.95%
1975	1,361	−1.14%
1982	1,560	+1.97%
1990	1,602	+0.33%
1999	1,646	+0.30%
2007	1,880	+1.68%
2012	1,942	+0.65%
2017	2,063	+1.22%
2023	2,074	+0.09%

Source: EHESS and INSEE (1968–2023)

== Notable people ==
- Jean Causeur – 1643–1771, butcher who was said to have lived to 131 years of age. Modern scrutiny of his birth records suggest that he was probably born in around 1665, making his age of death around 109 years, still an exceptional age for his time.
- Louis Marie Pellé – 1900-1944, born on November 18, 1900, in Ploumoguer, young tradesman and receiver of the PTT who has been shot by the Nazis at the age of 43. He had helped to hide fellow Jews in the countryside of northern Finistère, with the unofficial assistance of the gendarmes of Le Conquet.

== See also ==
- Communes of the Finistère department
