= Brixton Hill =

Road in south London

Coordinates: 51.4535°N 0.1205°W

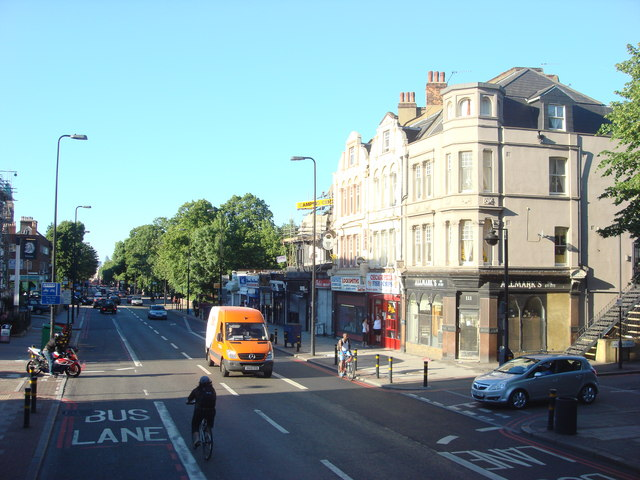
Brixton Hill, photographed in 2009

Brixton Hill is the name given to a two-thirds of a mile (1 km) section of road between Brixton and Streatham Hill in south London, England. The name also refers to the surrounding residential neighbourhood and former electoral ward in the London Borough of Lambeth.

Brixton Hill and Streatham Hill form part of the traditional main London to Brighton road (A23). The road follows the line of a Roman Road, the London to Brighton Way, which diverges from Stane Street near Kennington, and led south from the capital, Londinium, to a port on the south coast.

== History ==
Prior to the late 19th century, the road was known as Brixton (or Bristow) Causeway. On the eastern side of the road, a series of tree-lined open spaces and front gardens make up Rush Common — an area of former common land that, although it is subject to a prohibition on 'erections above the surface of the earth' under an Act of Parliament of 1806, has seen some incursions for building.

The name Brixton Hill has subsequently been given to the residential areas on both sides of the road, and from 2002 to 2022, it was also the name of an electoral ward of the London Borough of Lambeth.

From 1891 until the 1950s Brixton Hill was served by a regular London tram service; it was cable-drawn until 1904 when it was replaced by a conventional electric tram. The tram depot at Streatham Hill, opposite Telford Avenue, housed the tram cars, horses and the steam-powered winding gear for the cable. It is now a bus depot. Another surviving tram shed, which can still be seen near the junction of Brixton Hill with Christchurch Road, was designed by London County Council Tramways' architect G. Topham Forest, and had a capacity of 30 trams.

== Notable residents ==
- Edward Petherick, Australian bookseller and bibliophile lived at Yarra Yarra 30 Brixton Hill. He maintained a library, which was particularly extensive as regards Australia. George William Rusden was a frequent visitor when writing his books History of Australia and History of New Zealand.
- Tom Holland
- 67 (rap group)
- Sarah Everard, a marketing executive was living here. She was murdered in 2021.
- Bertie Joyce, a Royal Air Force pilot during World War II.

== Lambeth Council elections ==
Brixton Hill 2018 (3)
Party	Candidate	Votes	%	±%
Labour Co-op	Maria Kay	2,142		
Labour Co-op	Adrian Garden*	2,015		
Labour Co-op	Martin Tiedemann*	1,796		
Green	Gwen Buck	856		
Women's Equality	Janet Baker	842		
Liberal Democrats	Sarah Lewis	520		
Green	Richard Bultitude	517		
Green	Will Eaves	478		
Conservative	Tamara Bailey	389		
Conservative	Lavinia Cartwright	349		
Conservative	Savill Young	319		
Liberal Democrats	Peter Portelli	222		
Liberal Democrats	Jonathan Price	192		
Labour hold		Swing		
Labour hold		Swing		
Labour hold		Swing		

Brixton Hill 2014 (3)
Party	Candidate	Votes	%	±%
Labour	Adrian Garden	1,849		
Labour	Florence Eshalomi *	1,791		
Labour	Martin Tiedemann	1,560		
Green	Roger Baker	818		
Green	Andrew Child	768		
Green	Betty Mehari	719		
Conservative	James Calder	415		
Conservative	Charles Tannock	381		
Conservative	Michael Woolley	310		
UKIP	Paul Gregory	254		
Liberal Democrats	Chris Keating	244		
Liberal Democrats	Liz Maffei	231		
Liberal Democrats	Adam Pritchard	228		
TUSC	Lisa Bainbridge	132		
TUSC	Alex Richardson	83		
TUSC	Jessica Walters	74		
Total votes		9,857		
Labour hold		Swing		
Labour hold		Swing		
Labour hold		Swing		

Brixton Hill 2010 (3)
Party	Candidate	Votes	%	±%
Labour	Alexander Holland	2,805		
Labour	Steve Reed *	2,699		
Labour	Florence Nosegbe *	2,648		
Liberal Democrats	Kate Horstead	2,100		
Liberal Democrats	Krystal Johnson	1,873		
Liberal Democrats	John Mead	1,560		
Green	Thomas Law	1,108		
Green	Elkin Atwell	1,023		
Conservative	Tim Briggs	873		
Green	Phillipa Marlowe-Hunt	850		
Conservative	Victoria Edwards	768		
Conservative	Diana Thompson	688		
Total votes		18,995		
Labour hold		Swing		
Labour hold		Swing		
Labour hold		Swing		
