= Trébabu =

Trébabu Trebabu
- Commune
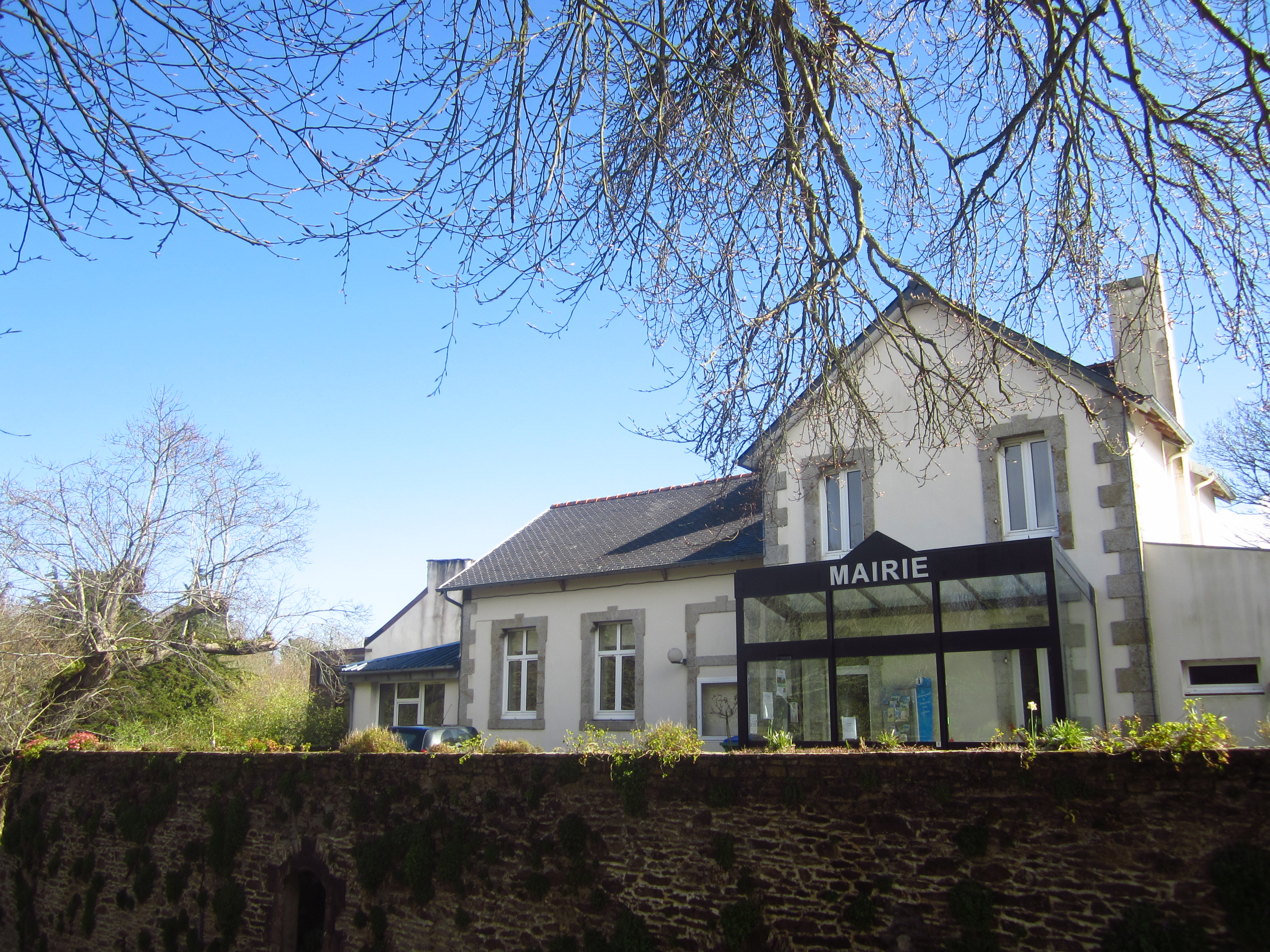
- The town hall in Trébabu
- Location of Trébabu
- Location within France Location within Brittany
- Coordinates: 48°22′16″N 4°44′02″W
- Country: France
- Region: Brittany
- Department: Finistère
- Arrondissement: Brest
- Canton: Saint-Renan
- Intercommunality: Pays d'Iroise

Government
  - Mayor (2020–2026): Jean Jacques Berthevas
- Area^{1}: 4.36 km^{2} (1.68 sq mi)
- Highest elevation: 58 m (190 ft)
- Lowest elevation: 1 m (3.3 ft)
- Population (2023): 368
  - Density: 84.4/km^{2} (219/sq mi)
- Time zone: UTC+01:00 (CET)
  - Summer (DST): UTC+02:00 (CEST)
- INSEE/Postal code: 29282 /29217
- ^{1} French Land Register data, which excludes lakes, ponds, glaciers > 1 km^{2} (0.386 sq mi or 247 acres) and river estuaries.

Trébabu (French pronunciation: [tʁebaby]; Breton: Trebabu) is a commune in the Finistère department of Brittany in north-western France.

== Population ==
Historical population
Year	Pop.	±% p.a.
1968	200	—
1975	174	−1.97%
1982	273	+6.65%
1990	346	+3.01%
1999	340	−0.19%
2007	367	+0.96%
2012	353	−0.77%
2017	352	−0.06%
2023	368	+0.74%
Source: INSEE

Inhabitants of Trébabu are called in French Trébabusiens.

== See also ==
- Communes of the Finistère department
