= Waiotahe River =

River in New Zealand

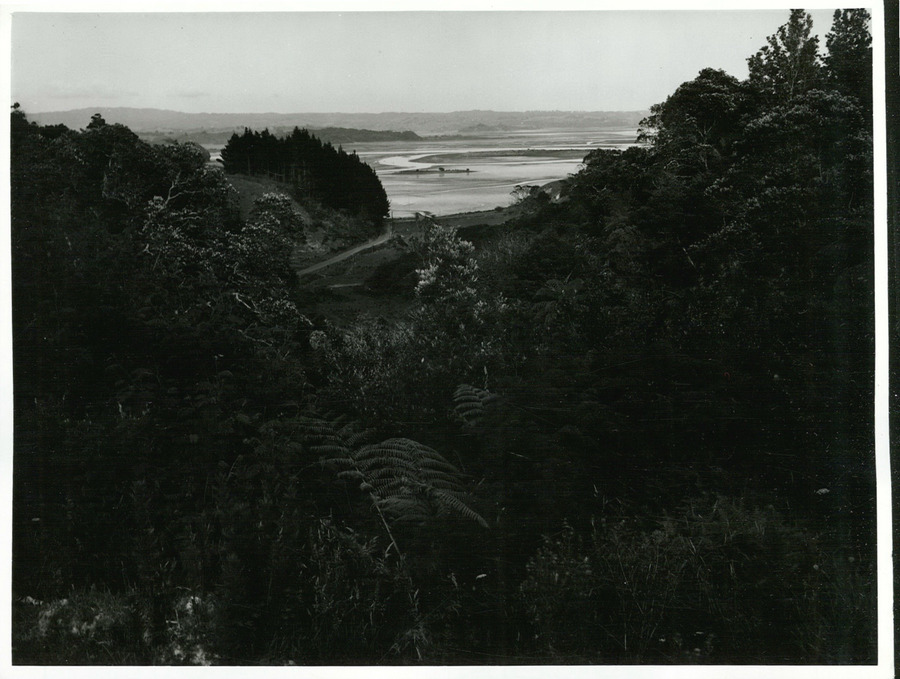
- The Waiotahe Estuary seen in 1973
- Route of the Waiotahe River
- Mouth of the Waiotahe River Waiotahe River (North Island)

Location
- Country: New Zealand

Physical characteristics
- Source
  - coordinates: 38°15′39″S 177°11′31″E
- Mouth
  - location: Karihipōtae
  - coordinates: 37°59′31″S 177°12′22″E
- Length: 31 km (19 mi)

Basin features
- Progression: Waiotahe River → Waiotahe Estuary → Karihipōtae → Bay of Plenty → Pacific Ocean
- Landmarks: Waiotahe Valley, Karihipōtae
- Tributaries
  - left: Paititutu Stream
  - right: Ohiao Stream, Ponuiahine Stream, Atuarere Stream, Oruamanganui Stream, Ruakākā Stream
- Bridges: Waiotahe River Bridge

The Waiotahe River (formerly known as the Waiotahi River) is a river of the Bay of Plenty Region of New Zealand's North Island. It flows north from its origins west of Oponae and east of Matahi to reach the Bay of Plenty 5 kilometres (3 mi) west of Ōpōtiki.

On 27 August 2015 the historical name error "Waiotahi" was corrected to the original Māori name "Waiotahe".

== See also ==
- List of rivers of New Zealand
