= René Lannuzel =

French missionary

René Marie Lannuzel (14 December 1846 – 2 June 1898) was a French missionary and one of the pioneers of the evangelization of Melanesia.

== Early life ==
Lannuzel was born on 14 December 1846 in Pen Allan Garo demesne Plourin, Finistère, France, to a family of farmers. His parents, François Lannuzel and Marie Catherine Le Gléau, managed the Pen Allan Garo farm (alternatively spelled Pen Al Lann Garo or Pen Ar Lann Garo), adhering to traditional Breton agricultural practices.

== Missionary work ==
Ordained as a secular priest and later associated with the Capuchin order, Lannuzel began his missionary career in Haiti and briefly served as captain of Breton volunteers during the Franco-Prussian War in 1870. In July 1880, he joined the ill-fated Port-Breton colony, founded by Charles du Breil, Marquis de Rays, in New Ireland (now Papua New Guinea). Departing from Barcelona aboard the India on 6 July 1880, he arrived on 14 October 1880 as the colony’s chaplain.

Despite celebrating the colony’s first Mass, Lannuzel quickly recognized the chaos and mismanagement within the settlement. He sought guidance from the Marist Fathers in Sydney but soon left the deteriorating colony.

In June 1881, Lannuzel moved to New Britain, where he founded the Beridni mission near Matupi, naming it Vila Maria in honor of the Marist Fathers. His efforts led to a few notable conversions, including the son of a local chief. In 1882, he returned to Europe, where he engaged with the Missionaries of the Sacred Heart in Paris and Issoudun and presented his ethnographic collections in Rome, earning significant recognition.

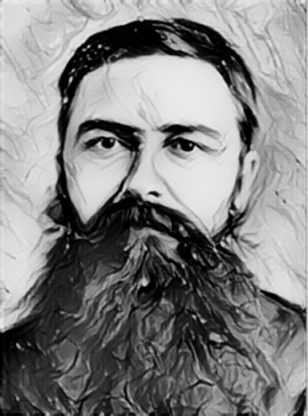
Drawing of the Reverend Rene Lannuzel inspired from one historical picture

== Later years ==
Lannuzel returned to the Pacific in late 1882, arriving in Cooktown, Queensland, in January 1883. He attempted to collaborate with Father Louis André Navarre on a joint mission in New Britain, but personal differences led to the project’s failure. Disheartened, Lannuzel lived in Sydney and Cooktown, planning to settle on Thursday Island to facilitate the evangelization of New Guinea. However, lacking support, he abandoned this plan and relocated to New Zealand.

In 1884, Bishop John Edmund Luck of Auckland appointed Lannuzel as the parish priest of Ōpōtiki, where he served until his death on 2 June 1898.

== Legacy ==
René Lannuzel’s missionary work marked an early effort to establish Catholic missions in Melanesia. Despite the challenges and setbacks, his endeavors laid the groundwork for subsequent evangelization in the region.
