= Lampaul-Plouarzel =

Lampaul-Plouarzel Lambaol-Blouarzhel
- Commune
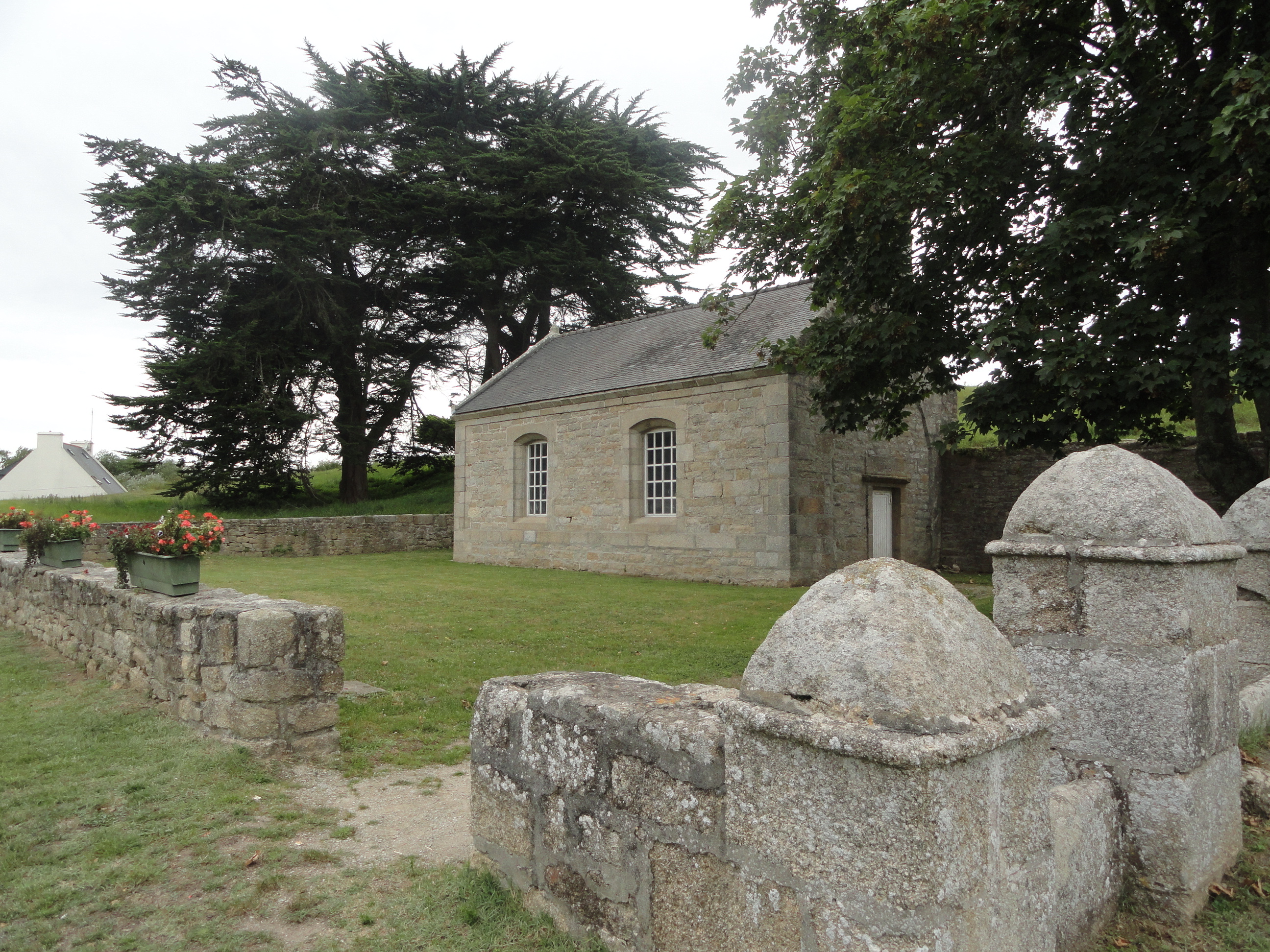
- The Chapel of Saint-Egarec, in Lampaul-Plouarzel
- Location of Lampaul-Plouarzel
- Location within France Location within Brittany
- Coordinates: 48°26′59″N 4°45′55″W
- Country: France
- Region: Brittany
- Department: Finistère
- Arrondissement: Brest
- Canton: Saint-Renan
- Intercommunality: Pays d'Iroise

Government
  - Mayor (2020–2026): Michel Jourden
- Area^{1}: 4.04 km^{2} (1.56 sq mi)
- Highest elevation: 60 m (200 ft)
- Lowest elevation: 0 m (0 ft)
- Population (2023): 2,221
  - Density: 550/km^{2} (1,420/sq mi)
- Time zone: UTC+01:00 (CET)
  - Summer (DST): UTC+02:00 (CEST)
- INSEE/Postal code: 29098 /29810
- ^{1} French Land Register data, which excludes lakes, ponds, glaciers > 1 km^{2} (0.386 sq mi or 247 acres) and river estuaries.

Lampaul-Plouarzel (French pronunciation: [lɑ̃pɔl pluaʁzɛl]; Breton: Lambaol-Blouarzhel) is a commune in the Finistère department in Brittany in northwestern France.

== Population ==
Inhabitants of Lampaul-Plouarzel are called in French Lampaulais.

Historical population
Year	Pop.	±% p.a.
1968	1,464	—
1975	1,482	+0.17%
1982	1,583	+0.95%
1990	1,662	+0.61%
1999	1,766	+0.68%
2007	2,053	+1.90%
2012	2,060	+0.07%
2017	2,111	+0.49%
2023	2,221	+0.85%
Source: INSEE

== See also ==
- Communes of the Finistère department
