= Lanrivoaré =

Lanrivoaré Lanriware
- Commune
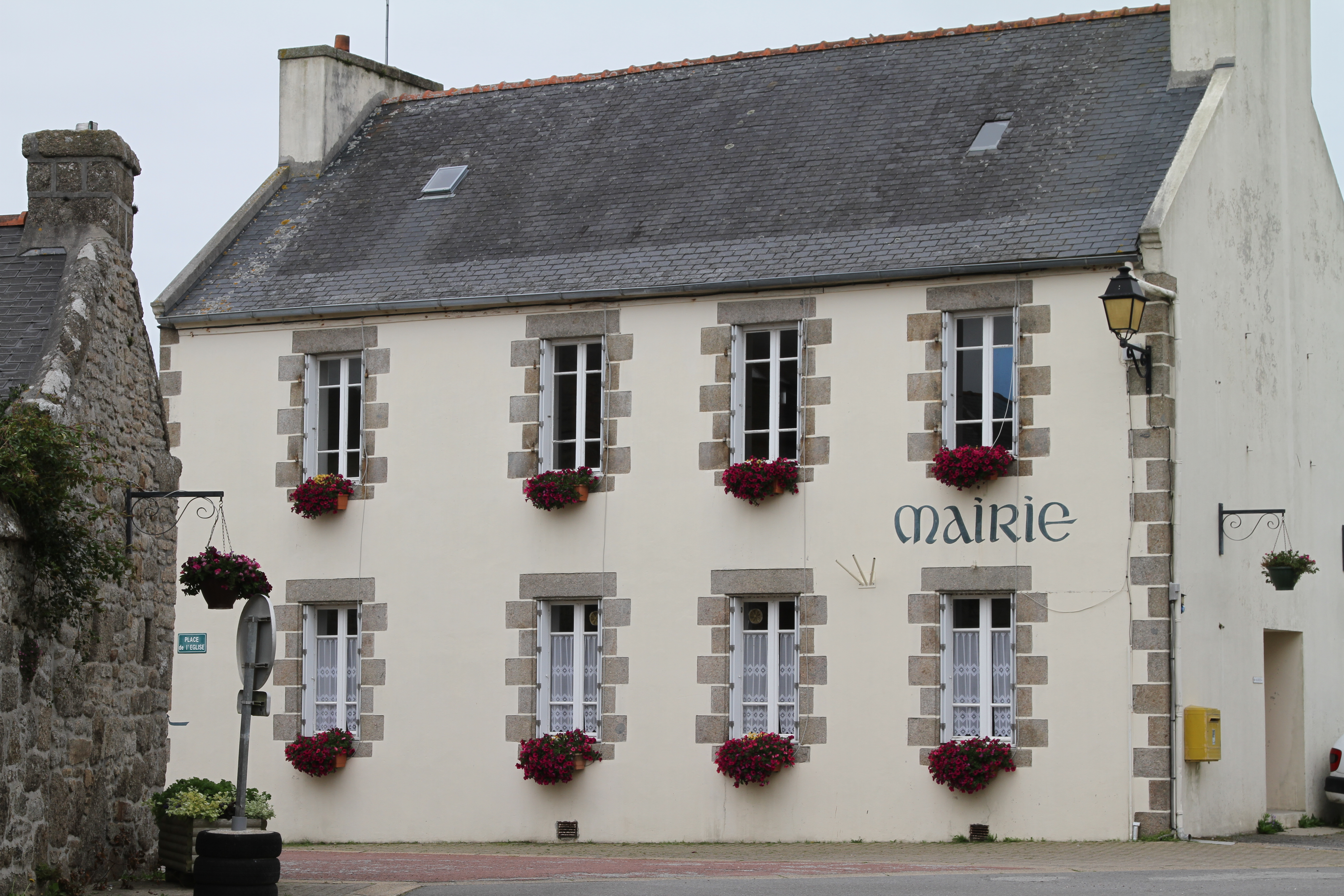
- The town hall in Lanrivoaré

- Coat of arms
- Location of Lanrivoaré
- Location within France Location within Brittany
- Coordinates: 48°28′26″N 4°38′20″W
- Country: France
- Region: Brittany
- Department: Finistère
- Arrondissement: Brest
- Canton: Saint-Renan
- Intercommunality: Pays d'Iroise

Government
  - Mayor (2020–2026): Pascale André
- Area^{1}: 14.89 km^{2} (5.75 sq mi)
- Highest elevation: 104 m (341 ft)
- Lowest elevation: 22 m (72 ft)
- Population (2023): 1,551
  - Density: 104.2/km^{2} (269.8/sq mi)
- Time zone: UTC+01:00 (CET)
  - Summer (DST): UTC+02:00 (CEST)
- INSEE/Postal code: 29119 /29290
- ^{1} French Land Register data, which excludes lakes, ponds, glaciers > 1 km^{2} (0.386 sq mi or 247 acres) and river estuaries.

Lanrivoaré (French pronunciation: [lɑ̃ʁivwaʁe]; Breton: Lanriware) is a commune in the Finistère department of Brittany in north-western France.

== Population ==
Historical population
| Year | Pop. | ±% p.a. |
|---|---|---|
| 1968 | 695 | — |
| 1975 | 723 | +0.57% |
| 1982 | 955 | +4.06% |
| 1990 | 1,271 | +3.64% |
| 1999 | 1,290 | +0.17% |
| 2007 | 1,352 | +0.59% |
| 2012 | 1,449 | +1.40% |
| 2017 | 1,464 | +0.21% |
| 2023 | 1,551 | +0.97% |
Source: INSEE

Inhabitants of Lanrivoaré are called in French Lanrivoaréens.

== See also ==
- Communes of the Finistère department
