= Pen Allan Garo =

French Historical Site

Pen Allan Garo or Pen Ar Garo is a hamlet in the commune of Plourin, located in the Finistère department of France. It is best known as the residence of notable historical figures such as René Lannuzel (a missionary in New Zealand), Bertie Joyce (a Royal Air Force soldier), and Michel Rioualen (a political representative of Finistère). Today, the Pen Allan Garo demesne is also recognized as one of the tourist attractions in the Pays de Léon.

== Etymology and name variations ==
Pen Allan Garo combines several descriptive elements. Pen refers to "a summit" or "an end" in Breton, while Allan may be a variation of al lann, meaning "the heath." The addition of Garo likely refers to the Garo family, who inhabited the estate and its surroundings (notably Kerradec/Keradec) in the 18th century. While garo in Breton means "rugged" or "rocky," suggesting difficult terrain, it is more probable that the name honors the family itself. This distinction was made to differentiate it from a neighboring location, Pen Al Lan, less than 5 km away, or other similarly named sites in Finistère, such as Pen Al Lan Bras. The name has been spelled in various ways over time, including Penn Ar Garo, Penn Al Lann Garo, Pen Allan Garo, Pen-al-Lan, Pen Al Lan Garo, Pen-al-Lann, Pen An Alle, Penallan, Penalan, Pen Al Lann Garo, and Pen Allan Avo—likely due to historical evolution or spelling errors.

== Geography ==
Pen Allan Garo is located in Finistère, in the agricultural region of Léon. It lies near Plourin and is surrounded by fragmented landscapes of cultivated plots and hedgerows. Neighboring farms such as Keradec Bras, Keradec Névez, Kervoulouarn, and Kerguen demonstrate the high density of agricultural estates in the region.

== History ==
Pen Allan Garo has been an agricultural estate since at least the early 18th century. One of its buildings, a bread oven, is estimated to date back to the late 16th century. Initially known as Pen Allan (or Penallan), the Garo suffix was later added to the name in reference to the Garo family, long-time owners and cultivators of the estate. Olivier Garo notably died at the estate on May 3, 1741.

The missionary René Lannuzel, who later moved to Opotiki, New Zealand, was born and raised in Pen Allan Garo. He frequently visited his family while pursuing his priestly vocation.

During World War II, Bertie Joyce, a Royal Air Force pilot, sought refuge at Pen Allan Garo after his plane crashed near the estate.

Today, Pen Allan Garo is one of the few exceptionally well-preserved agricultural estates in Finistère. Most of its historic buildings, including a washhouse, a well, a bread oven, two kraou (animal shelters), and a main farmhouse, have been restored. Since 2005, the estate has been repurposed as guesthouses, offering public access to one of the rare pre-18th-century agricultural domains still standing.
