= Tréouergat =

Tréouergat Treouergad
- Commune
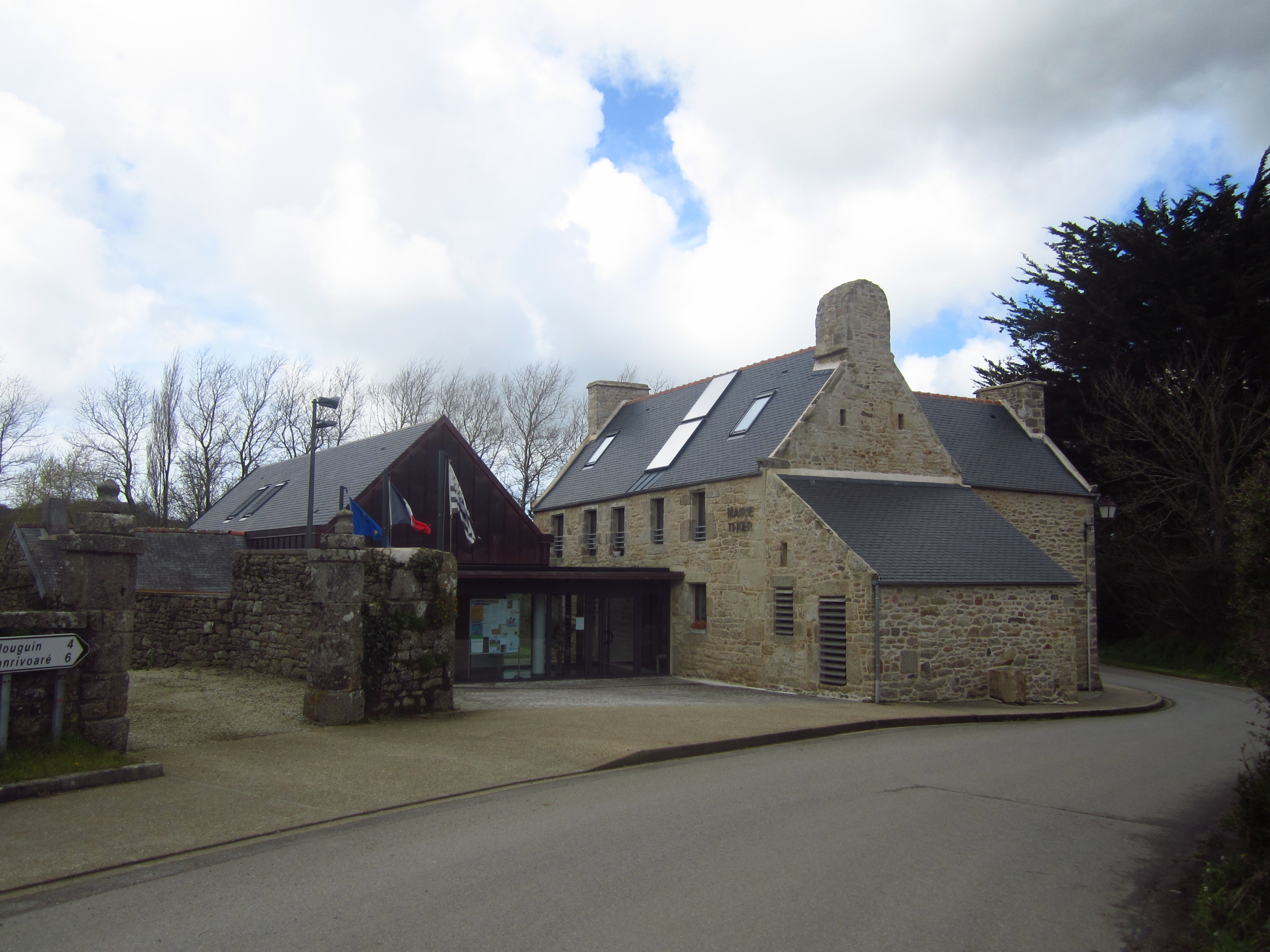
- The town hall in Tréouergat
- Location of Tréouergat
- Location within France Location within Brittany
- Coordinates: 48°29′51″N 4°36′04″W
- Country: France
- Region: Brittany
- Department: Finistère
- Arrondissement: Brest
- Canton: Saint-Renan
- Intercommunality: Pays d'Iroise

Government
  - Mayor (2020–2026): Reun Tréguer
- Area^{1}: 6.10 km^{2} (2.36 sq mi)
- Highest elevation: 92 m (302 ft)
- Lowest elevation: 24 m (79 ft)
- Population (2023): 323
  - Density: 53.0/km^{2} (137/sq mi)
- Time zone: UTC+01:00 (CET)
  - Summer (DST): UTC+02:00 (CEST)
- INSEE/Postal code: 29299 /29290
- ^{1} French Land Register data, which excludes lakes, ponds, glaciers > 1 km^{2} (0.386 sq mi or 247 acres) and river estuaries.

Tréouergat (French pronunciation: [tʁewɛʁɡat]; Breton: Treouergad) is a commune in the Finistère department of Brittany in north-western France.

== Population ==
Historical population
Year	Pop.	±% p.a.
1968	256	—
1975	253	−0.17%
1982	267	+0.77%
1990	263	−0.19%
1999	252	−0.47%
2007	224	−1.46%
2012	313	+6.92%
2017	341	+1.73%
2023	323	−0.90%
Source: INSEE

== Breton language ==
The municipality launched a linguistic plan through Ya d'ar brezhoneg on 23 September 2005.

== See also ==
- Communes of the Finistère department
