= Lanildut =

Lanildut Lannildud
- Commune
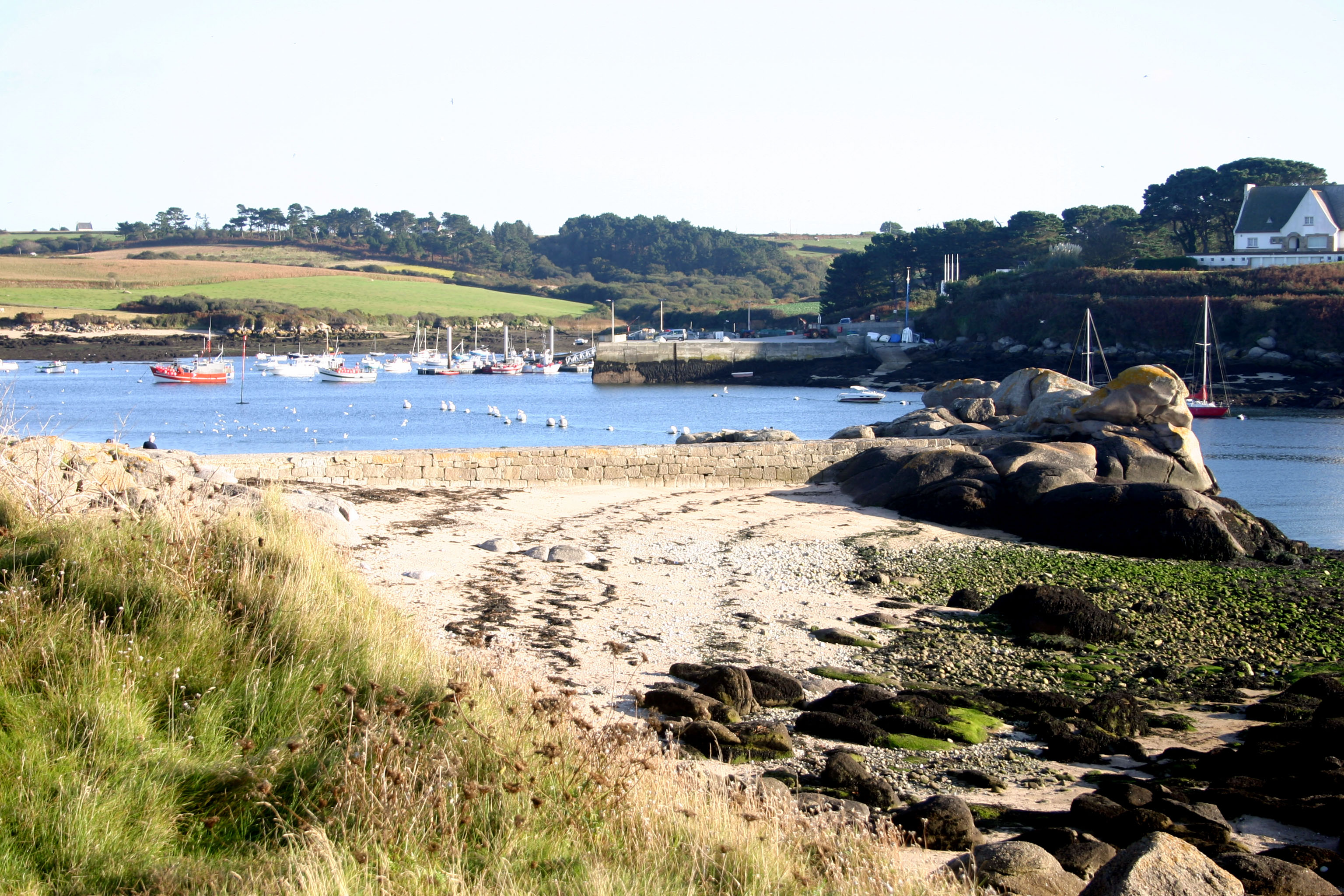
- Lanildut and l'Aber-Ildut
- Location of Lanildut
- Location within France Location within Brittany
- Coordinates: 48°28′26″N 4°44′40″W
- Country: France
- Region: Brittany
- Department: Finistère
- Arrondissement: Brest
- Canton: Saint-Renan
- Intercommunality: Pays d'Iroise

Government
  - Mayor (2020–2026): Jean-Noël Briant
- Area^{1}: 5.82 km^{2} (2.25 sq mi)
- Highest elevation: 71 m (233 ft)
- Lowest elevation: 0 m (0 ft)
- Population (2023): 1,013
  - Density: 174/km^{2} (451/sq mi)
- Time zone: UTC+01:00 (CET)
  - Summer (DST): UTC+02:00 (CEST)
- INSEE/Postal code: 29112 /29840
- ^{1} French Land Register data, which excludes lakes, ponds, glaciers > 1 km^{2} (0.386 sq mi or 247 acres) and river estuaries.

Lanildut (French pronunciation: [lanildyt]; Breton: Lannildud) is a commune in the Finistère department of Brittany in north-western France.

== Population ==
Inhabitants of Lanildut are called in French Lanildutiens.

== See also ==
- Communes of the Finistère department
