= Canton of Saint-Renan =

Canton of Finistère department, France

Coordinates: 48.43°N 4.62°W

The canton of Saint-Renan is an administrative division of the Finistère department, northwestern France. Its borders were modified at the French canton reorganisation which came into effect in March 2015. Its seat is in Saint-Renan.

It consists of the following communes:

1. Brélès
2. Le Conquet
3. Île-Molène
4. Lampaul-Plouarzel
5. Lanildut
6. Lanrivoaré
7. Locmaria-Plouzané
8. Milizac-Guipronvel
9. Ouessant
10. Plouarzel
11. Plougonvelin
12. Ploumoguer
13. Plourin
14. Porspoder
15. Saint-Renan
16. Trébabu
17. Tréouergat
