= Porspoder =

Porspoder Porspoder
- Commune
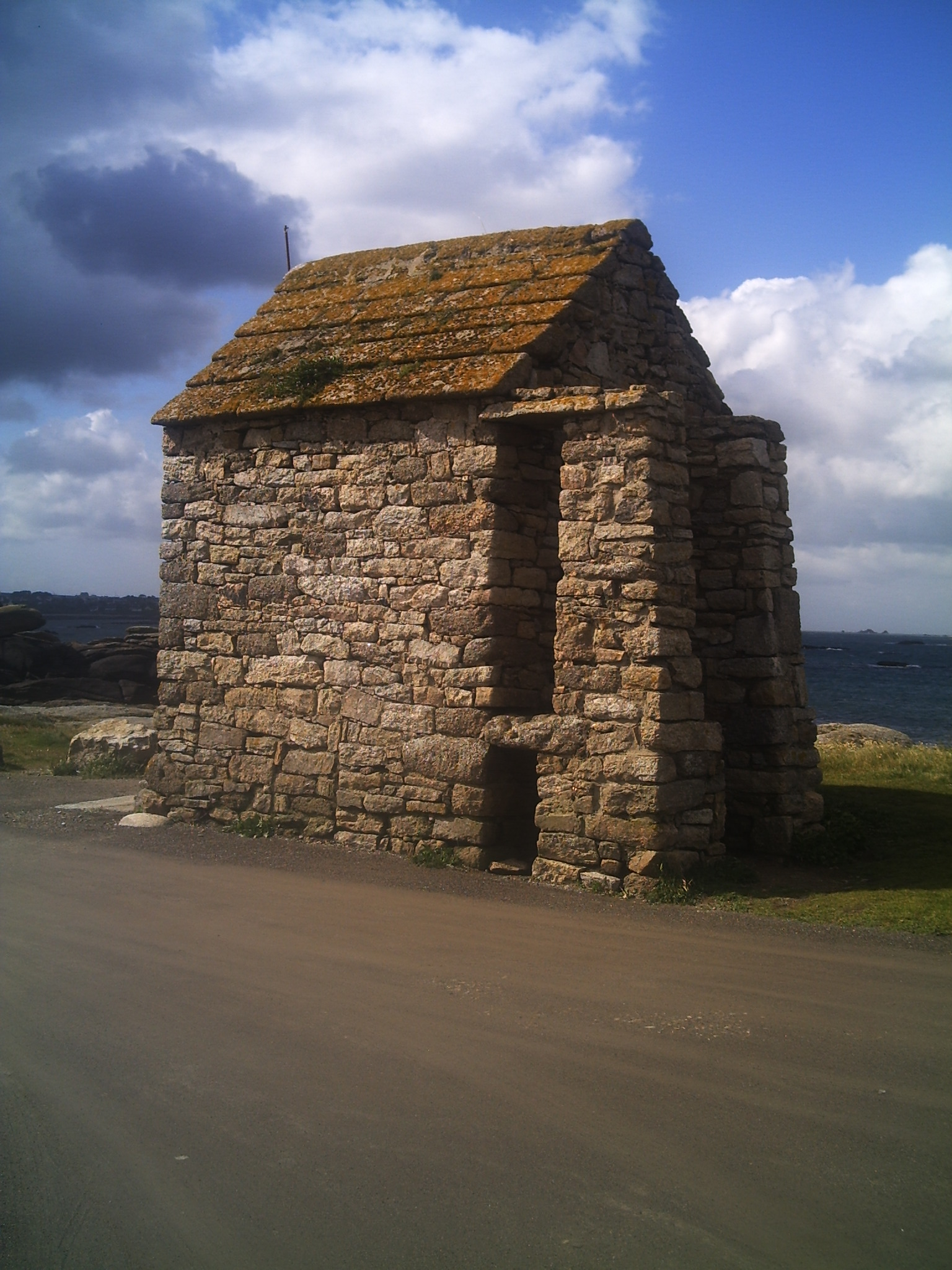
- Port Melon
- Location of Porspoder
- Location within France Location within Brittany
- Coordinates: 48°30′34″N 4°45′51″W
- Country: France
- Region: Brittany
- Department: Finistère
- Arrondissement: Brest
- Canton: Saint-Renan
- Intercommunality: Pays d'Iroise

Government
  - Mayor (2020–2026): Yves Robin
- Area^{1}: 11.29 km^{2} (4.36 sq mi)
- Highest elevation: 61 m (200 ft)
- Lowest elevation: 0 m (0 ft)
- Population (2023): 1,753
  - Density: 155.3/km^{2} (402.1/sq mi)
- Time zone: UTC+01:00 (CET)
  - Summer (DST): UTC+02:00 (CEST)
- INSEE/Postal code: 29221 /29840
- ^{1} French Land Register data, which excludes lakes, ponds, glaciers > 1 km^{2} (0.386 sq mi or 247 acres) and river estuaries.

Porspoder (French pronunciation: [pɔʁspɔdɛʁ]; Breton: Porspoder) is a commune in the Finistère department of Brittany in north-western France.

== Population ==
Historical population
Year	Pop.	±% p.a.
1968	1,461	—
1975	1,324	−1.40%
1982	1,309	−0.16%
1990	1,373	+0.60%
1999	1,567	+1.48%
2007	1,600	+0.26%
2012	1,781	+2.17%
2017	1,810	+0.32%
2023	1,753	−0.53%
Source: INSEE

Inhabitants of Porspoder are called in French Porspodériens.

== See also ==
- Communes of the Finistère department
