= George William Rusden =

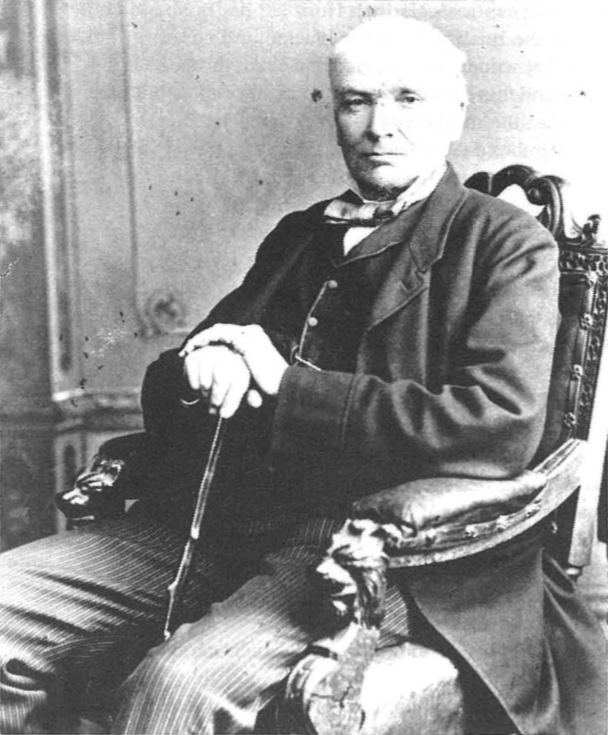
George William Rusden in 1885

George William Rusden (9 July 1819 – 23 December 1903) was an English-born historian, active in Australia.

== Early life ==
Rusden was born in Leith Hill Place (near Dorking), Surrey, England, son of the Rev. George Keylock Rusden, M.A. (1784–1859) and his wife Anne, née Townsend. G.K. Rusden was a polyglot and mathematician.

== Australia ==
George William Rusden travelled with his family to Australia and befriended Charles Nicholson on the voyage. Rusden was at first employed on the land, and was soon managing properties. At 28 years of age Rusden travelled to China and worked for a time at brother-in-law Ellis Gilman's Canton factory. Rusden visited his brother Alfred who was a tea-taster in Shanghai before returning to Sydney in early 1849.

== Legacy ==
A house at Melbourne Grammar School has been named in honour of Rusden, and was established in 1914 after he bequeathed the school £2000 and the bulk of his manuscripts. The house is known as Rusden House, and its colour is yellow.

== Books ==
- (1891) Moyarra: An Australian Legend in Two Cantos London:E.A.Petherick
