= Saint-Renan =

Saint-Renan Lokournan
- Commune
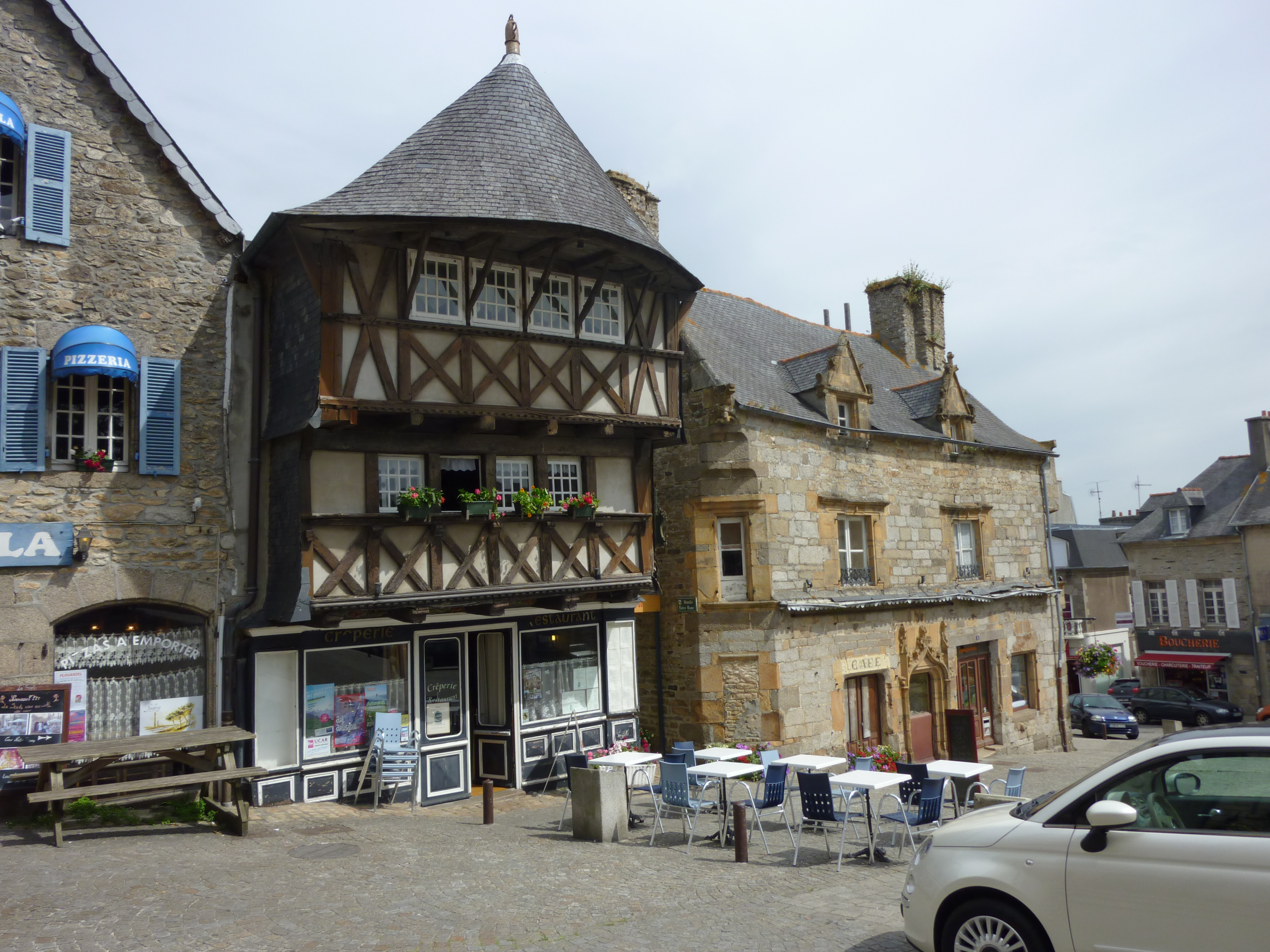
- Two of the oldest buildings of downtown Saint-Renan in 2010.

- Coat of arms
- Location of Saint-Renan
- Location within France Location within Brittany
- Coordinates: 48°25′54″N 4°37′14″W
- Country: France
- Region: Brittany
- Department: Finistère
- Arrondissement: Brest
- Canton: Saint-Renan
- Intercommunality: Pays d'Iroise

Government
  - Mayor (2020–2026): Gilles Mounier
- Area^{1}: 13.31 km^{2} (5.14 sq mi)
- Highest elevation: 97 m (318 ft)
- Lowest elevation: 26 m (85 ft)
- Population (2023): 8,577
  - Density: 644.4/km^{2} (1,669/sq mi)
- Time zone: UTC+01:00 (CET)
  - Summer (DST): UTC+02:00 (CEST)
- INSEE/Postal code: 29260 /29290
- ^{1} French Land Register data, which excludes lakes, ponds, glaciers > 1 km^{2} (0.386 sq mi or 247 acres) and river estuaries.

Saint-Renan (French pronunciation: [sɛ̃ ʁənɑ̃]; Breton: Lokournan, pronounced [loˈkurnãn]) is a commune in the Finistère department of Brittany in north-western France.

== History ==
The city is named after the Irish Saint Rónán who came in the 5th or 6th century to evangelize the area.

While Brest was still a village, the city of Saint-Renan developed throughout the Middle Ages. In 1276, the Duke of Brittany established one of the courts of justice there. Until the end of the 17th century, Saint-Renan was a "Sénéchaussée" (town of the seneschal), first ducal and then royal. Many of the buildings in the town center are from this period.

== Population ==
Inhabitants of Saint-Renan are called Renanais in French.

Historical population

Year	Pop.	±% p.a.
1793	886	—
1800	908	+0.35%
1806	841	−1.27%
1821	1,043	+1.45%
1831	1,074	+0.29%
1836	1,094	+0.37%
1841	1,027	−1.26%
1846	1,010	−0.33%
1851	1,282	+4.88%
1856	1,246	−0.57%
1861	1,241	−0.08%
1866	1,277	+0.57%
1872	1,307	+0.39%
1876	1,497	+3.45%
1881	1,569	+0.94%
1886	1,758	+2.30%
1891	1,806	+0.54%
1896	1,815	+0.10%
1901	1,954	+1.49%

Year	Pop.	±% p.a.
1906	2,087	+1.33%
1911	2,218	+1.23%
1921	2,172	−0.21%
1926	2,158	−0.13%
1931	2,099	−0.55%
1936	2,188	+0.83%
1946	2,860	+2.71%
1954	2,682	−0.80%
1962	3,077	+1.73%
1968	3,488	+2.11%
1975	4,550	+3.87%
1982	5,542	+2.86%
1990	6,576	+2.16%
1999	6,818	+0.40%
2007	7,292	+0.84%
2012	7,713	+1.13%
2017	8,110	+1.01%
2023	8,577	+0.94%

Source: EHESS and INSEE (1968–2023)

== Tourism ==
Old houses of 15th and 16th centuries are historical and architectural attractions.

Held every two years, the medieval festival of Saint-Renan, the biggest of the department, highlights the city's heritage.

The Saturday morning market offers local products including kouign-amann, kig ha farz, mushrooms, crepes, cider, caramel, and chitterling sausages.

Six artificial lakes are part of the industrial heritage of the city, which was nicknamed "the European capital of tin" in the 1960s. The two largest, "Ty Colo" and "Comiren", are walking destinations.

The 17th-century church has undergone several transformations over time. Built on top of a hill, its bell tower is visible from a large part of the city. The churchyard contains a military area dedicated to British aviators from the Royal Air Force who died during the World War II.

== Breton language ==
In 2016, 14% of primary-school children attended bilingual schools, where Breton is taught alongside French.

== Notable natives and residents ==
- Nolwenn Leroy, singer and songwriter, who rose to fame after winning the second series of the French television reality show Star Academy.
- Benoît Hamon, politician, member of both the Socialist Party (“PS”), and the Party of European Socialists, candidate for the 2017 French Presidential Election.

== See also ==
- Communes of the Finistère department
