= July 5 (Eastern Orthodox liturgics) =

Day in the Eastern Orthodox liturgical calendar

Eastern Orthodox liturgical calendar
July 4	July 5	July 6
July 5 O.S. ≍ July 18 N.S. July 5 N.S ≍ June 22 O.S.

An Eastern Orthodox cross

July 5 in Eastern Orthodox liturgical calendars is a feast day and a day of commemoration of saints and martyrs. Although some Orthodox churches use the Revised Julian Calendar and others use the traditional Julian calendar, the fixed commemorations for their respective July 5 are broadly the same, no matter which calendar is used. (Note: Despite the dates being the same, the days to which they refer typically differ by 13 days. The notation Old Style or O.S. is sometimes used to indicate a date in the traditional Julian Calendar (the "Old Calendar"). The notation New Style or N.S. indicates a date in the Revised Julian calendar (the "New Calendar").)

== Saints ==
- Martyr Anna, at Rome (304)
- Martyr Cyrilla of Cyrene in Libya, a widow (4th century) (Note: "At Cyrene, in Lybia, St. Cyrilla, a martyr, in the persecution of Diocletian. For a long while she held on her hand burning coals with incense, lest by shaking off the coals she should seem to offer incense to the idols. She was afterwards cruelly scourged, and went to her spouse adorned with her own blood.") (Note: She is probably the same Cyrilla commemorated in July 4 by the 1956 edition of the «Μικρὸν Εὐχολόγιον ἢ Ἁγιασματάριον» of the Apostoliki Diakonia of the Church of Greece.)
- Hieromartyr Athanasius, Deacon, of Jerusalem (451) (Note: "At Jerusalem, St. Athanasius, a deacon, who was apprehended by the heretics for defending the Council of Chalcedon, and after experiencing all kinds of torments, was put to the sword.")
- Venerable Lampadus, monk, of Irenopolis (10th century)
- Venerable Athanasius of Mt. Athos and his six disciples (1000)

== Pre-Schism Western saints ==
- Hieromartyr Stephen of Rhegium (Stephen of Nicea), Bishop of Rhegium, disciple of Apostle Paul, and with him Bishop Suerus and the women Agnes, Felicitas, and Perpetua (1st century) (Note: By tradition he was consecrated first Bishop of Reggio in Italy by the Apostle Paul and martyred under Nero. He is the main patron of Reggio.: See also: (in Italian) Stefano di Nicea. Wikipedia. (Italian Wikipedia).)
- Saint Zoe of Rome (c. 286) (Note: With a Greek name, she lived in Rome. Married to a high official of the imperial court, she was martyred for the faith.) (Note: "At Rome, St. Zoe, martyr, wife of the blessed martyr Nicostratus. Whilst praying at the tomb of the apostle St. Peter, during the time of Diocletian, she was seized by the persecutors, and cast into a dark dungeon; then being suspended on a tree by her neck and hair, and suffocated by a loathsome smoke, she yielded up her soul in the confession of the Lord.")
- Saint Febronia (Trofimena), virgin-martyr of Sicilly (c. 304)
- Saints Agatho and Triphina, martyrs in Sicily (c. 306)
- Saints Fragan and Gwen Teirbron (Blanche) of Brittany (5th century) (Note: They left Britain after the departure of the Romans and were the parents of Sts Winwalöe, Jacut and Guithern. Churches in Brittany are dedicated to them.)
- Saint Philomena, a saint venerated in San Severino near Ancona in Italy (c. 500)
- Saint Edana (Etaoin), patron of parishes in the west of Ireland, a famous holy well bears her name. (Note: She lived near the confluence of the rivers Boyle and Shannon.)
- Saint Erfyl (Eurfyl), founder of the church of Llanerfyl in Powys in Wales.
- Saints Probus and Grace, saints of Cornwall, by tradition husband and wife. (Note: The Church of Tressilian or Probus, is dedicated to them.)
- Saint Triphina, the mother of St Tremorus the infant-martyr, she spent the latter years of her life in a convent in Brittany (6th century)
- Saint Numerian (Memorian), Bishop of Trier, Confessor (c. 666)
- Saint Morwenna, patroness of Morwenstow, England (6th century) (see also July 8 )
- Saint Modwenna, successor of St. Hilda as Abbess of Whitby in England (c. 695)
- Saint Modwenna (Modwena), an anchoress and later Abbess of Polesworth in Warwickshire, England (9th century)

== Post-Schism Orthodox saints ==
- Saints Athanasius and Theodosius of Cherepovets (both c. 1388), disciples of St. Sergius of Radonezh.
- New Martyr Cyprian of Koutloumousiou Monastery, Mount Athos (1679)

=== New martyrs and confessors ===
- New Hieromartyr Gennadius Zdorovtsev, Priest, with New Martyrs Abbess Elizabeth (Romanova), Grand Duchess of Russia, Nun Barbara, and those with them, at Alapaevsk (1918):

- Grand Duke Sergius; the Princes John, Constantine, Igor, and Vladimir; and Martyr Theodore.

- New Confessor Agapitus (Taube), Monk of Optina Monastery (1936) (Note: See also: (in Russian) Агапит (Таубе). Википедии. (Russian Wikipedia).)

== Other commemorations ==
- Icon of the Mother of God "Economissa". (Note: See also: (in Russian) Экономисса. Википедии. (Russian Wikipedia).)
- Uncovering of the relics (1422) of Venerable Sergius of Radonezh, Abbot and Wonderworker (1392)
- Synaxis of 23 Saints of Lesvos.

== Icon gallery ==
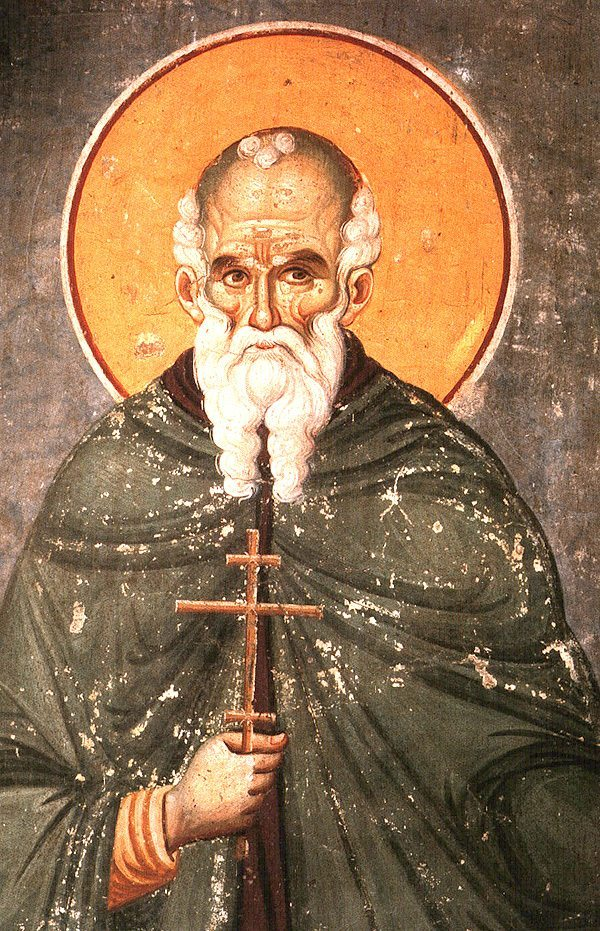
Venerable Athanasius of Mt. Athos.

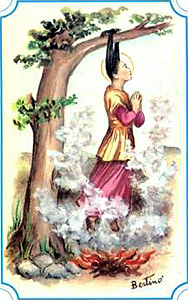
St. Zoe of Rome.

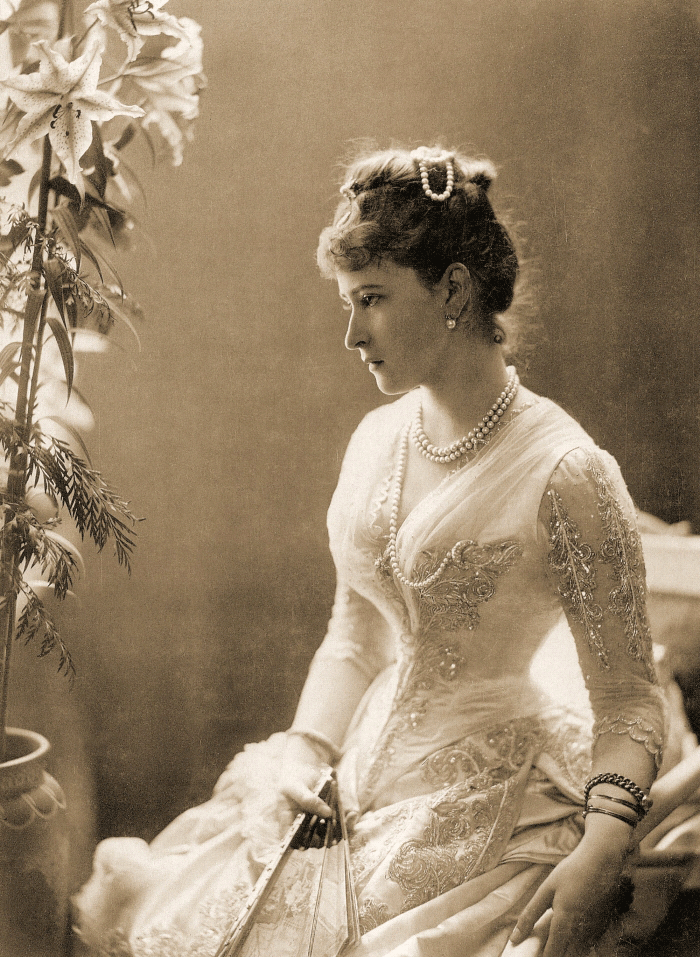
New Martyr Elizabeth (Romanova), Grand Duchess of Russia.

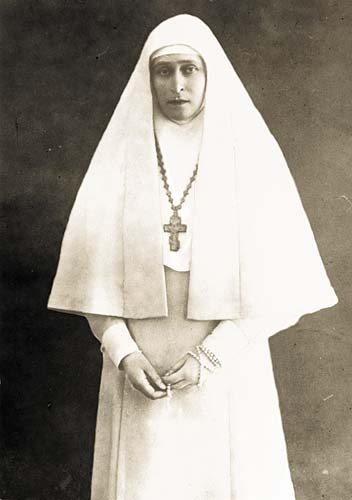
New Martyr Abbess Elizabeth (Romanova), Grand Duchess of Russia.

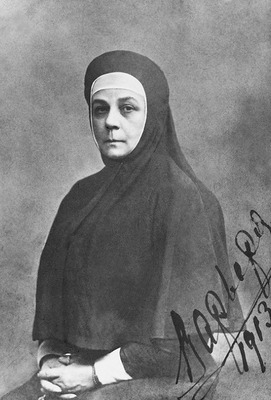
Nun Barbara (Yakovleva).

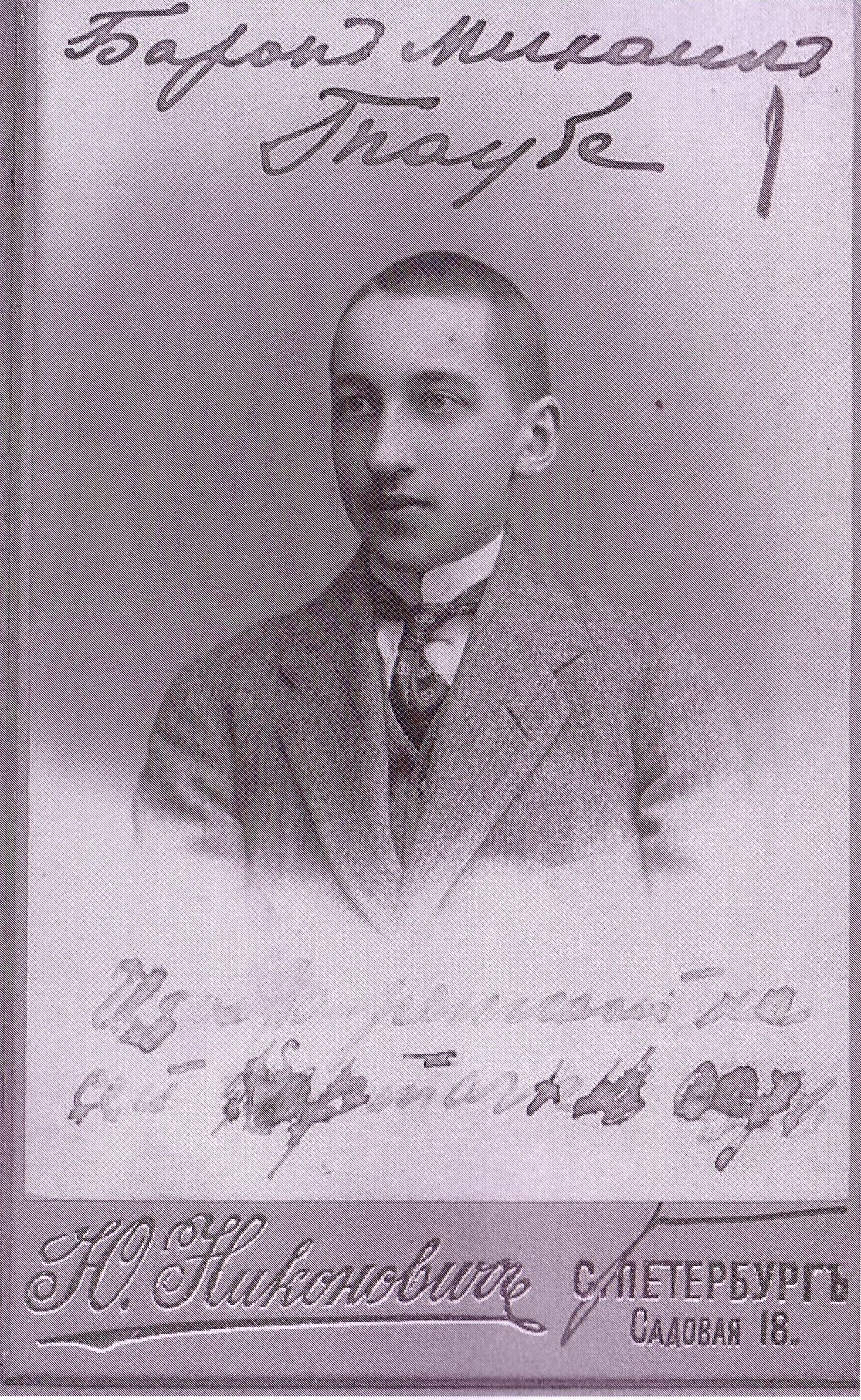
New Confessor Agapitus (Taube), Monk of Optina Monastery.

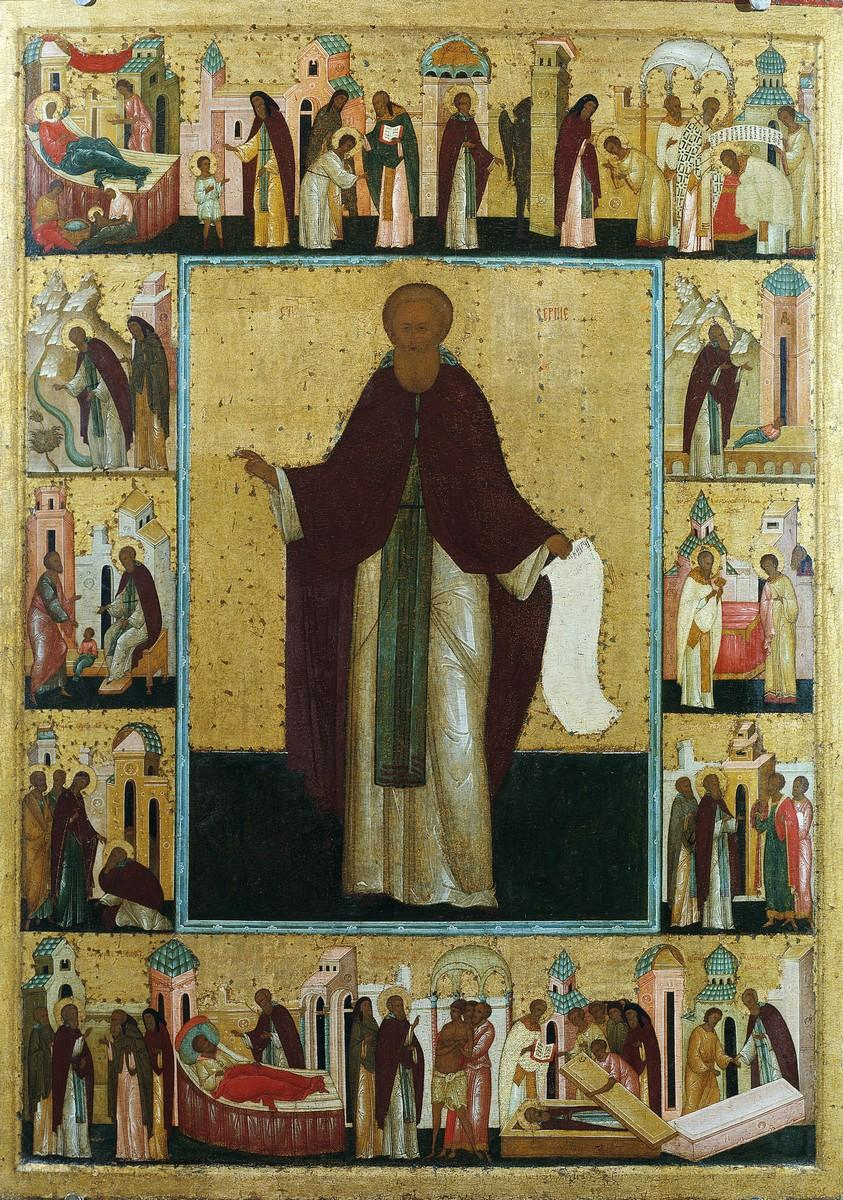
Venerable Sergius of Radonezh, Abbot and Wonderworker.

== Sources ==
- July 5/July 18. Orthodox Calendar (PRAVOSLAVIE.RU).
- July 18 / July 5. HOLY TRINITY RUSSIAN ORTHODOX CHURCH (A parish of the Patriarchate of Moscow).
- July 5. OCA - The Lives of the Saints.
- July 5. The Year of Our Salvation - Holy Transfiguration Monastery, Brookline, Massachusetts.
- The Autonomous Orthodox Metropolia of Western Europe and the Americas (ROCOR). St. Hilarion Calendar of Saints for the year of our Lord 2004. St. Hilarion Press (Austin, TX). p. 49.
- The Fifth Day of the Month of July. Orthodoxy in China.
- July 5. Latin Saints of the Orthodox Patriarchate of Rome.
- The Roman Martyrology. Transl. by the Archbishop of Baltimore. Last Edition, According to the Copy Printed at Rome in 1914. Revised Edition, with the Imprimatur of His Eminence Cardinal Gibbons. Baltimore: John Murphy Company, 1916. pp. 195–196.
- Rev. Richard Stanton. A Menology of England and Wales, or, Brief Memorials of the Ancient British and English Saints Arranged According to the Calendar, Together with the Martyrs of the 16th and 17th Centuries. London: Burns & Oates, 1892. pp. 309–312.

Greek Sources

- Great Synaxaristes: (in Greek) 5 ΙΟΥΛΙΟΥ. ΜΕΓΑΣ ΣΥΝΑΞΑΡΙΣΤΗΣ.
- (in Greek) Συναξαριστής. 5 Ιουλίου. ECCLESIA.GR. (H ΕΚΚΛΗΣΙΑ ΤΗΣ ΕΛΛΑΔΟΣ).
- (in Greek) ΙΟΥΛΙΟΣ. Αποστολική Διακονία της Εκκλησίας της Ελλάδος (Apostoliki Diakonia of the Church of Greece).
- (in Greek) 05/07/2018. Ορθόδοξος Συναξαριστής.

Russian Sources

- (in Russian) 18 июля (5 июля). Православная Энциклопедия под редакцией Патриарха Московского и всея Руси Кирилла (электронная версия). (Orthodox Encyclopedia - Pravenc.ru).
- (in Russian) 5 июля по старому стилю / 18 июля по новому стилю. Русская Православная Церковь - Православный церковный календарь на 2018 год.
- (in Russian) 5 июля (ст.ст.) 18 июля 2014 (нов. ст.). Русская Православная Церковь Отдел внешних церковных связей. (DECR).
