= Budic II of Brittany =

Sub-Roman Breton king

Budic II (Medieval Latin: Budicius; Welsh: Budig or Buddig; c. 460 – c. 550), formerly known as Budick, was a king of Cornouaille in Brittany in the late 5th and early 6th centuries. He was father of Hoel as well as several Celtic saints.

== Life ==
Budic II was born in Cornouaille to a member of its royal family, possibly Erich of Brittany. He was named after his uncle Budic I of Brittany. Budic II succeeded to the throne, c. 478, but was expelled by a cousin and fled to the court of King Aircol Lawhir of Dyfed, where another cousin Amon Ddu was employed. There, he wed Anowed or Arianwedd, the sister of Saint Teilo. After the death of his usurping relative, he returned to Cornouaille to claim the Breton throne, later joined by Saint Teilo whom he reputedly persuaded to rid the area of a terrible dragon that had been terrorising the countryside. Teilo was able to subdue the beast and tied it to a rock in the sea.

The date of his death is uncertain. Some sources claim he died in 545. However, this contradicts other sources which claim that Saint Teilo had fled to France in 549 to escape the Yellow Plague of Rhos and had spent time in Brittany in Budic's company. Upon his death, his kingdom was usurped by Macliau, king of the neighbouring Veneti.

== Offspring ==
Three of Budic's sons by his Welsh wife were revered as saints by the Celtic Christianity: St. Ismael, bishop of Meneva and Rhos, St. Euddogwy, bishop of Llandaff; and St. Tyfei, a martyr. A fourth son (credited to Emyr Llydaw, that is the "Emperor of Brittany", in late Welsh sources) was Hoel I Mawr, whose son Tewdwr eventually succeeded to the kingdom of Cornouaille.

One of his daughters was Saint Gwen the Three-Breasted, who married Saint Fragan (also a member of the dynasty in Dumnonia) and bore him Saints Wethenoc, Jacut, Winwaloe, and Creirwy. She then married Eneas Ledewig ("Aeneas the Breton") and bore him Saint Cadfan.

== Arthurian legend ==
In Geoffrey of Monmouth's pseudohistorical History of the Kings of Britain, Budic is said at different places to have married a sister of Aurelius Ambrosius and Uther Pendragon (making him Arthur's uncle) and to have married Pendragon's daughter Anna (making him Arthur's brother-in-law). This confusion reappears in Wace and Layamon, although most later sources make his son Hoel Arthur's "cousin". In later romances, a possibly derived character of King Nentres (also written Neuntres among other forms) of Garlot marries Arthur's half-sister Elaine (also known as Blasine).
