= Cynyr Ceinfarfog =

Cynyr Ceinfarfog (born c. 480) was a ruler of the Kingdom of Dyfed in Wales. He was known as Cunoricus in Latin and in English as Kendrick or as Cynyr the Red.

According to the earliest Welsh versions of the Arthurian legend, he was the foster parent who raised King Arthur, with his son Sir Kay, though this later was attributed to Sir Ector.

Born about 480 AD he may have been born a Roman citizen, and ruled from Caer Goch (Caer Gawch), near Mynyw (St. Davids). Some historians say that he could have been the son of Aergol Lawhir and brother of Vortiporius and may have been a Saint and not a King.

== Family ==
He is reputed to have married twice, first to Princess Sefin, daughter of St. Brychan, King of Brycheiniog, and second to Anna daughter of Vortimer.

He was the father of Saint Non (the mother of Saint David of Wales) and Saint Wenna (the mother of Saint Cybi).

His grandchildren include

- Saint Cybi.
- Saint David, patron saint of Wales.

His great-grandchildren include

- Winwaloe
- Jacut
- Wethenoc (or Gwethenoc or Guethenoc)
- Creirwy (or Creirvy or Klervi)
- Cadfan.
