= Saint-Jacut-de-la-Mer =

Saint-Jacut-de-la-Mer Sant-Yagu-an-Enez
- Commune
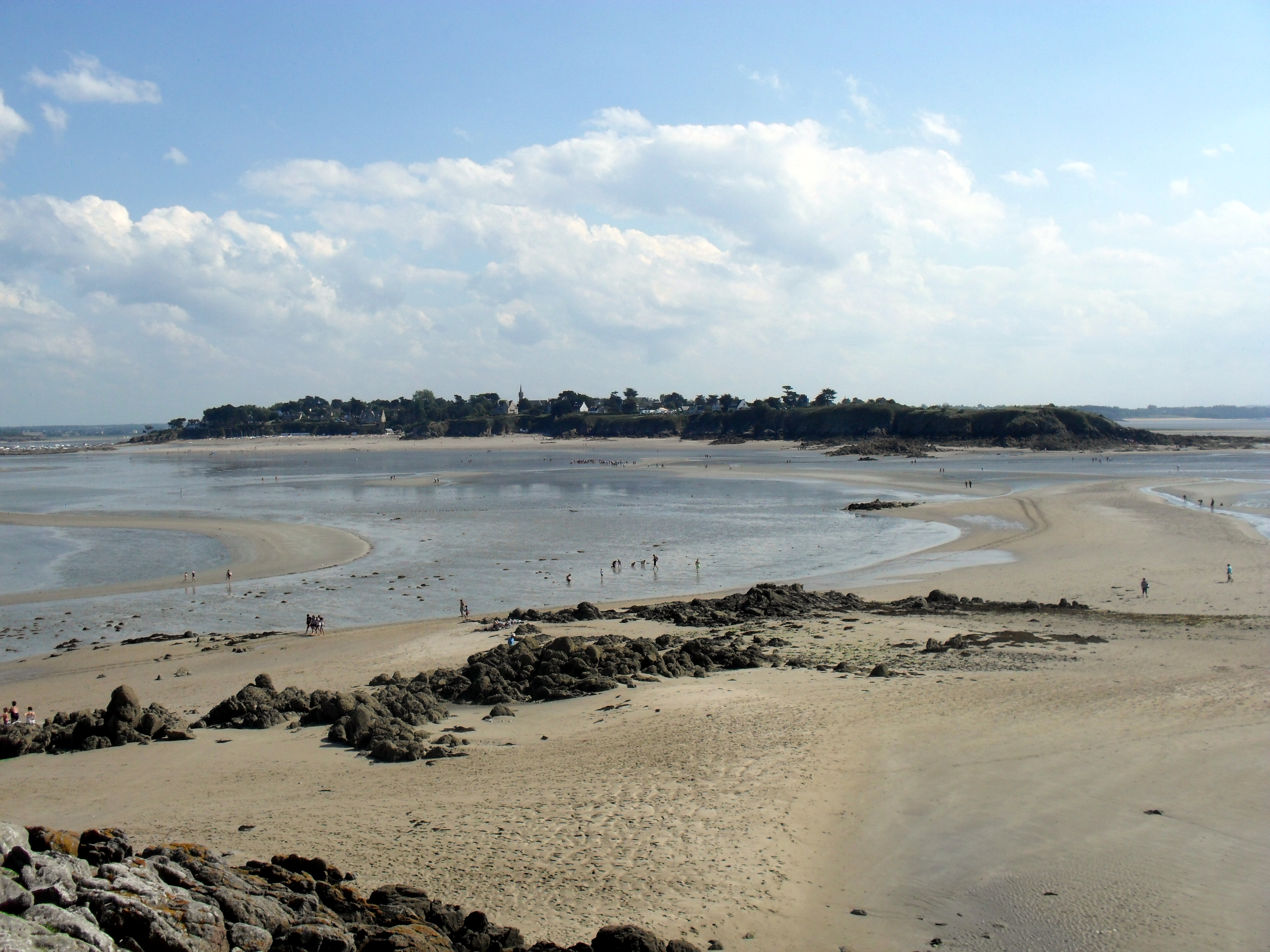
- The peninsula of Saint-Jacut-de-la-Mer
- Location of Saint-Jacut-de-la-Mer
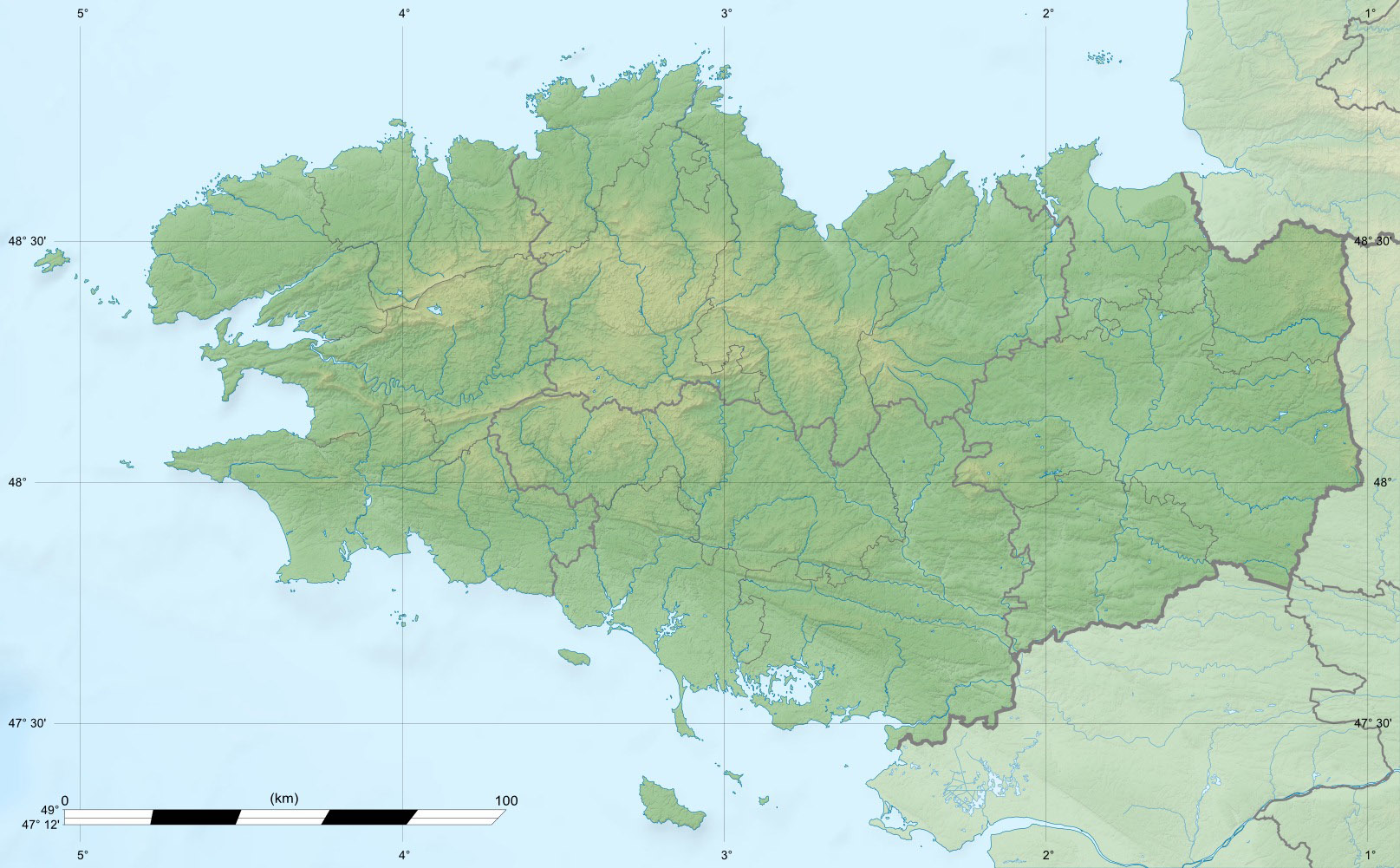
- Location within France Location within Brittany
- Coordinates: 48°35′52″N 2°11′20″W
- Country: France
- Region: Brittany
- Department: Côtes-d'Armor
- Arrondissement: Dinan
- Canton: Plancoët
- Intercommunality: Dinan Agglomération

Government
  - Mayor (2020–2026): Jean-Luc Pithois
- Area^{1}: 2.92 km^{2} (1.13 sq mi)
- Highest elevation: 43 m (141 ft)
- Lowest elevation: 0 m (0 ft)
- Population (2023): 908
  - Density: 311/km^{2} (805/sq mi)
- Time zone: UTC+01:00 (CET)
  - Summer (DST): UTC+02:00 (CEST)
- INSEE/Postal code: 22302 /22750
- ^{1} French Land Register data, which excludes lakes, ponds, glaciers > 1 km^{2} (0.386 sq mi or 247 acres) and river estuaries.

Saint-Jacut-de-la-Mer (French pronunciation: [sɛ̃ ʒaky də la mɛʁ], literally Saint-Jacut of the Sea; Breton: Sant-Yagu-an-Enez) is a commune in the Côtes-d'Armor département of Brittany in northwestern France.

== Population ==
Historical population
Year	Pop.	±% p.a.
1968	1,022	—
1975	934	−1.28%
1982	893	−0.64%
1990	797	−1.41%
1999	871	+0.99%
2007	836	−0.51%
2012	865	+0.68%
2017	906	+0.93%
2023	908	+0.04%
Source: INSEE

Inhabitants of Saint-Jacut-de-la-Mer are called jaguens (masculine) and jaguines (feminine) in French.

== Location ==
Saint-Jacut is sited on a well protected peninsula between two sea inlets. The sandy beach slopes unusually gently: the lateral distance between the low tide and high tide positions - as much as five km - is correspondingly above average, as is the speed with which the sea moves between the two extremities.

== Prehistory ==
The peninsula of Saint-Jacut and the Ebihens archipelago have the presence of several archeological sites attesting to human presence during the Neolithic, Bronze Age and Iron Age. Most of these sites are the result of work sites and small encampments in which humans exploited the mineral and sea resources of the area.

== History ==
The village of Saint-Jacut evolved around successive abbeys founded on the peninsula. It provided the monastery with food and supplies and more importantly, it served as one its seigneuries. The history of the first abbey is legendary, its story only written down in an anonymous 11th-century Latin document from the time of the abbey's second founding.

The legend holds that a British-born monk named "Iagu" ("Jacut" in the local dialect of Gallo) founded a monastery at the site of an older hermitage established by a Saint Doac on the "Island of Landoac" (literally "llan of Doac"). St. Jacut's family had fled the Anglo-Saxon invasions. He arrived in Armorica with his father, Fragan, his mother, Gwen Teirbron, and his twin, Guethenoc. The family settled in Ploufragan, where his sister Clervie (or Klervi or Creirwy) and his younger brother, Winwaloe, were born.

In time, the abbey would come to follow Saint Columbanus's version of the Celtic monastic rule. The monks began construction of levees (the digue des Moines) that would ensure that the land connecting Landoac to the mainland did not flood during high tides and creating the presqu'île ("almost island") of Saint-Jacut. During the Norman invasions, the monks abandoned the abbey, retreating to the safety of southern Brittany in Saint-Jacut-les-Pins.

The abbey was rebuilt in 1008 by the Abbot Hinguethen at the current site of the Abbey of Saint Jacut. The new abbey followed the Rule of Saint Benedict. The monks elected their abbot, who had spiritual and temporal authority over the abbey and its extensive properties throughout Brittany and in Cambridgeshire. The abbey enjoyed the patronage of the dukes of Brittany and the kings of France. From 1471 to 1647 the abbot was appointed by the temporal ruler of Brittany. After this, the abbots rarely resided at the abbey and, interested mostly in collecting its revenue, cared little for its upkeep.

The abbey entered into a period of decline, which was intensified by the French Wars of Religion. By 1604 it was described as being in ruins. There were several attempts at restoring the abbey to its former state. A whole new congregation of Maurist Benedictines moved in and rebuilt the abbey. Nevertheless, decline set in again, and by the time of the French Revolution only a handful of monks remained.

The village evolved just south of the abbey walls along what is now Grande Rue in the western part of the peninsula. The new monks repaired and expanded the levees, reclaiming farmland from the sea. For the villagers, a secular parish was established. It was known as Landouar (a variant of Landoac), and was part of the Bobital deanery within the old Bishopric of Saint-Malo. The parish church was at one stage consecrated to St James the Apostle, though later the church was dedicated to the Virgin Mary under the name of Our Lady of Landoar.

The main economic activity of the village was fishing, especially of mackerel. A 17th-century royal order limited fishing to an official flotilla of fifteen boats manned by 120 to 180 men. Other fishermen, hence, began to venture to Newfoundland in search of cod. To protect the coast from foreign incursion, Louis XIV's commissioner for fortifications, Vauban, ordered the construction of a watchtower, designed by Jean-Siméon Garangeau, on the Île de Ebihens in 1694. It is today private property.

During the French Revolution the town gained political independence from the abbey. A commune was established in 1790, and the town was first named "Isle-Jacut" and then "Port-Jacut." The few monks were chased away and the abbey looted in 1793. The ruins and land were later sold as national goods. (The Sisters of the Immaculate Conception of Saint-Méen-le-Grand purchased the property in 1875 and constructed the current buildings, now a retreat and exhibition centre.)

It was not until 1873 that the current name, "Saint-Jacut-de-la-Mer," was officially adopted. During the 19th century oyster fishing developed as a supplementary activity to mackerel fishing and by 1870 oyster farming was introduced. Saint-Jacut also became a seaside resort, adding yet another source of revenue for the inhabitants. In the 20th century this became the primary economic activity, completely replacing farming and fishing, although oyster farming continues. Urban space replaced farms, especially to the east and south of the original village and north of the abbey, along the now-coveted seashore.

== Twin town ==
- St Jacut is twinned with the town of Kidwelly in Carmarthenshire, South Wales.

== See also ==
- Communes of the Côtes-d'Armor department
