= July 4 (Eastern Orthodox liturgics) =

Day in the Eastern Orthodox liturgical calendar

Eastern Orthodox liturgical calendar
July 3	July 4	July 5
July 4 O.S. ≍ July 17 N.S. July 4 N.S ≍ June 21 O.S.

An Eastern Orthodox cross

July 4 in Eastern Orthodox liturgical calendars is a feast day and a day of commemoration of saints and martyrs. Although some Orthodox churches use the Revised Julian Calendar and others use the traditional Julian calendar, the fixed commemorations for their respective July 4 are broadly the same, no matter which calendar is used. (Note: Despite the dates being the same, the days to which they refer typically differ by 13 days. The notation Old Style or O.S. is sometimes used to indicate a date in the traditional Julian Calendar (the "Old Calendar"). The notation New Style or N.S. indicates a date in the Revised Julian calendar (the "New Calendar").)

== Saints ==
- Martyrs Theodotus and Theodota, martyred with St. Hyacinth at Caesarea in Cappadocia (108)
- Hieromartyr Theophilos, by the sword.
- Saint Korilla (Cyrilla). (Note: Her name is recorded only in the 1956 edition of the «Μικρὸν Εὐχολόγιον ἢ Ἁγιασματάριον» of the Apostoliki Diakonia of the Church of Greece, without any other details given. She is probably the same Cyrilla commemorated in July 5.)
- Hieromartyrs Innocent and Sabbatius, and 30 others with them, in Sirmium of Pannonia (304) (Note: "At Sirmium, Saints Innocent and Sebastia, with thirty other martyrs.")
- Hieromartyr Theodore of Cyrene, Bishop of Cyrene in Libya, (Note: "At Cyrene, in Lybia, the holy bishop Theodore. In the persecution of Diocletian, under the governor Dignian, he was scourged with leaded whips, and had his tongue cut out. Finally, however, he died a confessor.") and with him Martyrs Cyprilla, Aroa, and Lucia (310)
- Hieromartyr Donatus, Bishop of Libya, and Monk-martyr Hilarion (c. 361–363) (Note: "On this day we commemorate Saint Donatus, Bishop of Libya, though Galanos posits that this refers to Saint Donatus, Bishop of Arezzo.")
- Venerable Martha, mother of Symeon Stylites the Younger, of the Wonderful Mountain (551)
- Saint Andrew of Crete, Archbishop of Crete, the Jerusalemite (712)
- Saint Asclepias the Wonderworker.
- Venerable Menignos.

== Pre-Schism Western saints ==
- Prophets Hosea and Haggai (6th-4th century BCE) (see also: October 17, December 4, December 16)
- Saint Namphamon and Companions, of Carthaginian descent, he was martyred with several compatriots at Madaura in Numidia in North Africa and called 'the Archmartyr' (c. 180) (Note: "At Madaurus, in Africa, the martyr Namphanion and his companions, whom he strengthened for the combat and led to the crown of martyrdom.")
- Saint Jucundian, a martyr in North Africa. (Note: "In Africa, the birthday of St. Jucundian, a martyr who was drowned in the sea for Christ.")
- Saint Laurianus, Archbishop of Seville in Spain, he was martyred in Bourges in France (c. 544) (Note: "In the diocese of Bourges, St. Laurian, bishop of Seville and martyr, whose head was taken to Seville, in Spain.") (Note: Born in Pannonia, now Hungary, he was ordained deacon in Milan in Italy and later became Archbishop of Seville in Spain. He was martyred in Bourges in France.: See also: (in Spanish) Laureano (santo). Wikipedia. (Spanish Wikipedia).)
- Saint Finbar, an Abbot of Innis-Doimhle, (Note: Most likely present-day Inch, County Wexford.) in Wexford, Ireland (6th century)
- Saint Bertha of Artois (Bertha of Blangy), a Frankish and Anglo-Saxon Abbess of noble blood (c. 725) (Note: A lady of high station, after her husband's death she became a nun at the convent of Blangy in Artois in France, which she had founded and where she became abbess.)
- Saint Aurelian, a monk and Abbot of Ainay in France, he later became Archbishop of Lyon (895) (Note: See also: (in French) Aurélien (archbishop). Wikipédia. (French Wikipedia).)
- Saint Ulrich of Augsburg and Bavaria (973) (Note: Also Uldaricus, Udalric. Born in Augsburg in Germany, at the age of seven he was sent to the monastery of St Gall in Switzerland. In 923 he became Bishop of Augsburg and protected his people against the invading Magyars. In his old age he lived as a monk at St Gall. In 993 he became the first person to be canonised by the Pope of Rome.) (Note: "At Augsburg, in Bavaria, St. Uldaric, a bishop illustrious for extraordinary abstinence, liberality, vigilance, and the gift of miracles.")
- Saint Hatto, born of a noble Swabian family, he left all his property to the monastery of Ottobeuren in Germany, and became a monk there (985)
- Saint Procopius of Sázava, Abbot of Sázava in Bohemia (1053) (Note: Born in Czechia, he was ordained in Prague; later he became a hermit and finally founded the monastery of Sazava.) (see also: April 1 - East )

== Post-Schism Orthodox saints ==
- Burial of St. Andrew, Prince of Bogolubovo (1174)
- Saint Michael Choniates, Metropolitan of Athens (1220)
- Saint Andrew (Rublev), iconographer, of the Spaso-Andronikov Monastery, Moscow (1428)
- Saint Olimpia Tănase of Fărcașa, mother of Venerable Petroniu of Prodromu (1967) (Note: See: (in Romanian) Olimpia Tănase. Wikipedia. (Romanian Wikipedia).)

=== New martyrs and confessors ===
- Holy Royal Martyrs of Russia (1918):

- Tsar Nicholas II,
- Tsaritsa Alexandra,
- Crown Prince Alexius
- Grand Duchesses Olga, Tatiana, Maria, and Anastasia, and with them:
- New Martyr Passion bearer Eugene Botkin, physician.

- New Hieromartyr Nilus, Hieromonk, of Poltava (1918)
- New Hieromartyr Jonah (Sankov) the Athonite (1938) (Note: (in Russian) Санков, Иван Андреевич.) (see also: June 21 )
- New Hieromartyrs Sava (Trlajic), Bishop of Gornji Karlovac (1941) (Note: See also: (in Serbian) Сава Горњокарловачки. Википедији. (Serbian Wikipedia).) and Đorđe Bogić, Priest, of Nasice (1941)
- New Hieromartyr Demetrius Kazansky, Priest (1942)

== Other commemorations ==
- Icon of the Mother of God of Galatea.
- Translation of the relics (460–490) of St. Martin the Merciful, Bishop of Tours (397) (Note: "At Tours, the translation of St. Martin, bishop and confessor, and the Dedication of his Basilica, which took place on the anniversary of his elevation to the episcopate some years previous.") (see also: October 12, November 11, November 12)
- Uncovering of the relics of St. Euthymius the Wonderworker, Archimandrite, of Suzdal (1507) (Note: See also: (in Russian) Евфимий Суздальский. Википедии. (Russian Wikipedia).)
- Repose of Hieroschemamonk John, founder of Sarov Monastery (1737)
- Repose of Righteous Confessor Andrew the Russian, at Cairo (c. 1850)
- Slaying of General Dragoljub (Drazha) Mihailovic of Serbia (1946)
- Repose of Archpriest Tikhon Pelikh of Sergiyev Posad (1983)

== Icon gallery ==
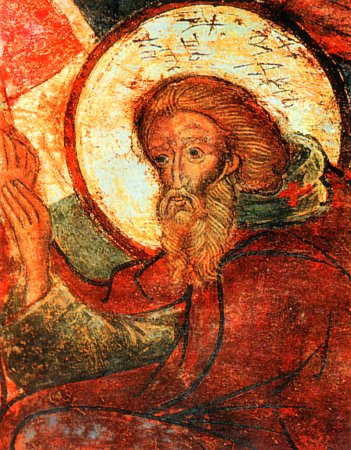
Fresco of St. Andrew of Crete, Archbishop of Crete, the Jerusalemite.

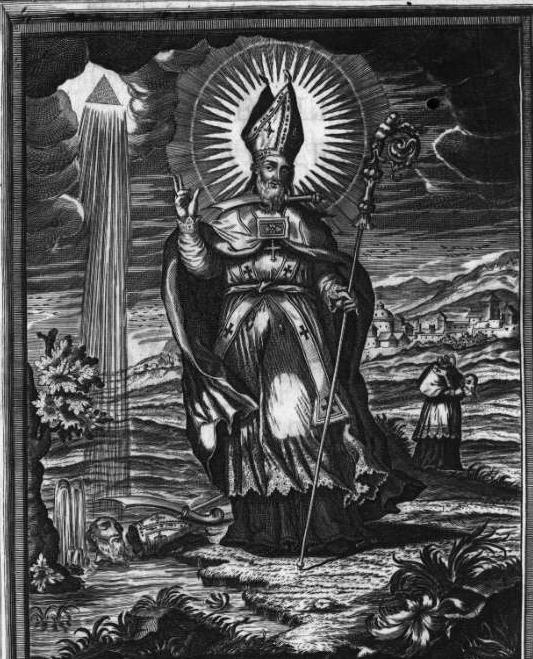
St. Laurianus, Archbishop of Seville in Spain, martyr.

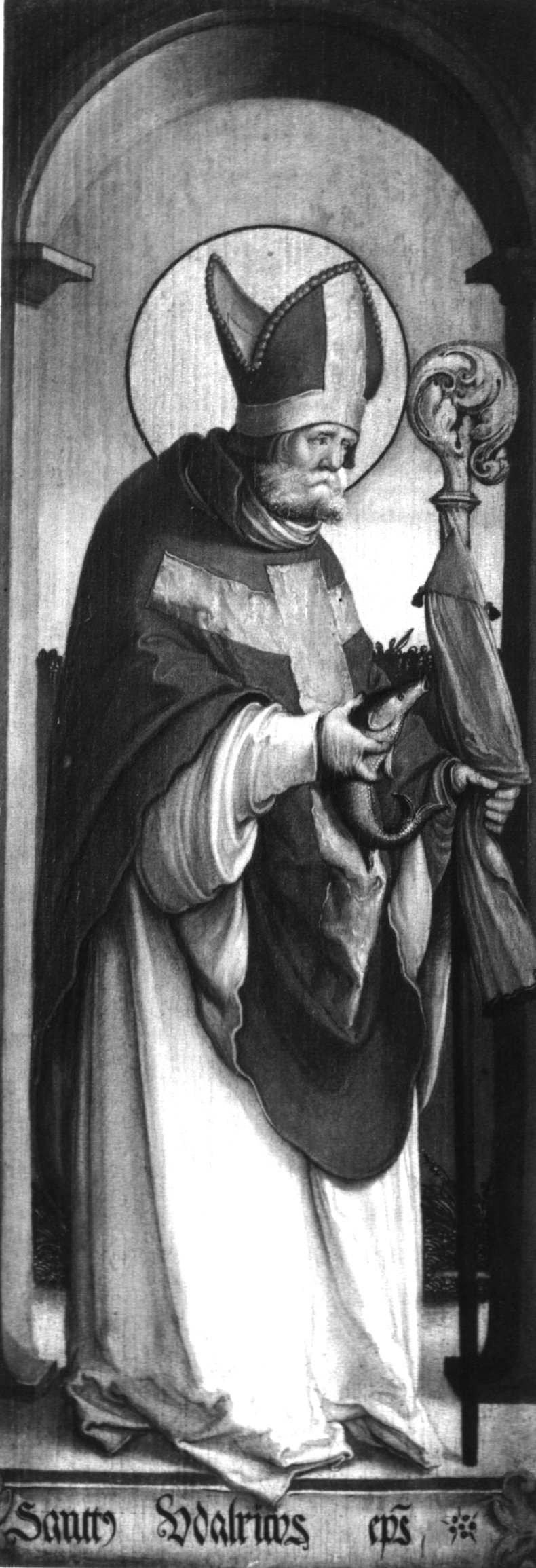
St. Ulrich of Augsburg

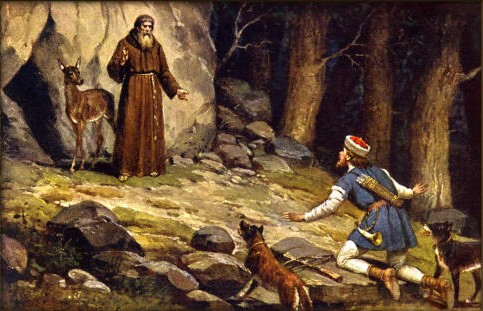
St. Procopius of Sázava, Abbot of Sázava in Bohemia.

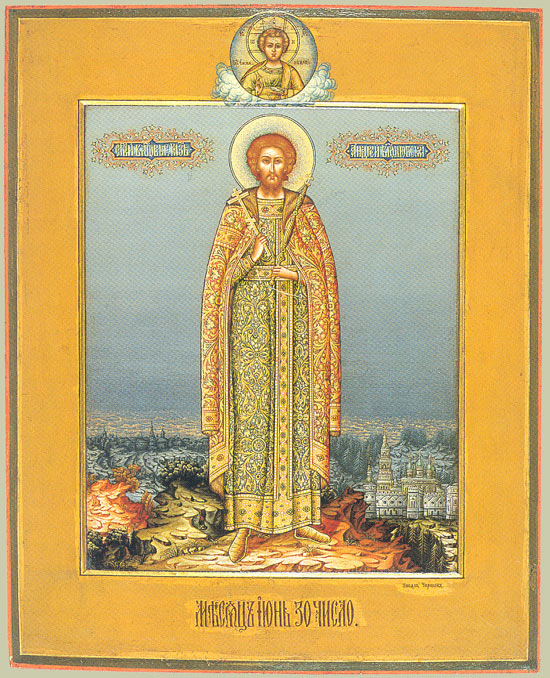
St. Andrew, Prince of Bogoliubovo.

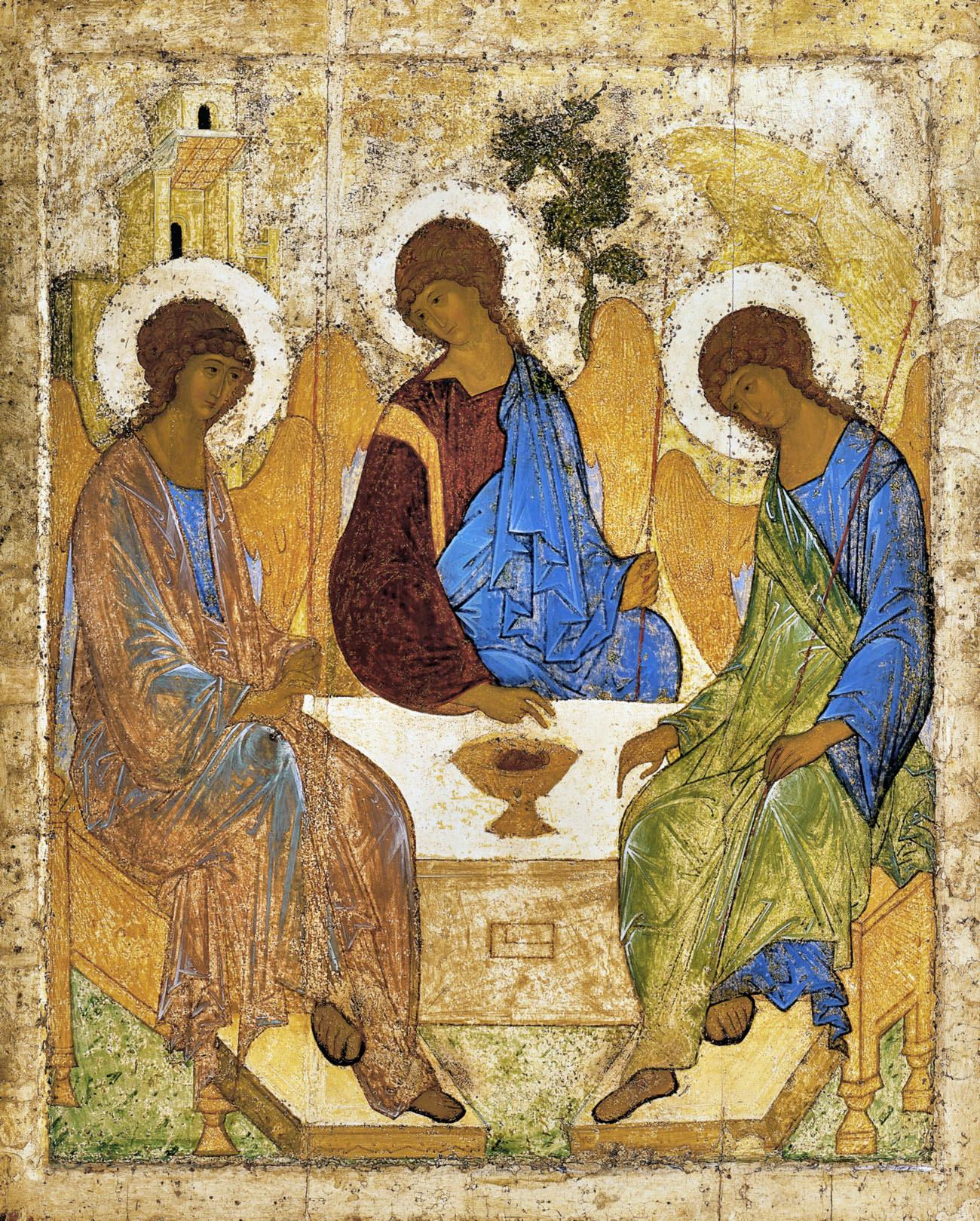
Andrew (Rublev)'s famous icon of the Trinity.

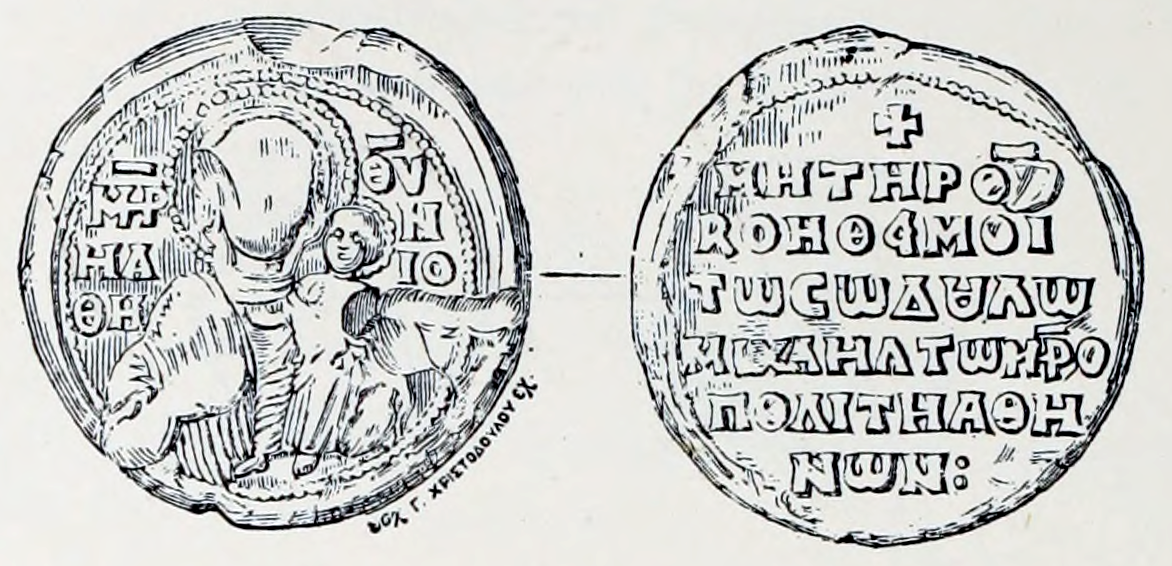
Lead seal of Michael Choniates as Metropolitan of Athens.

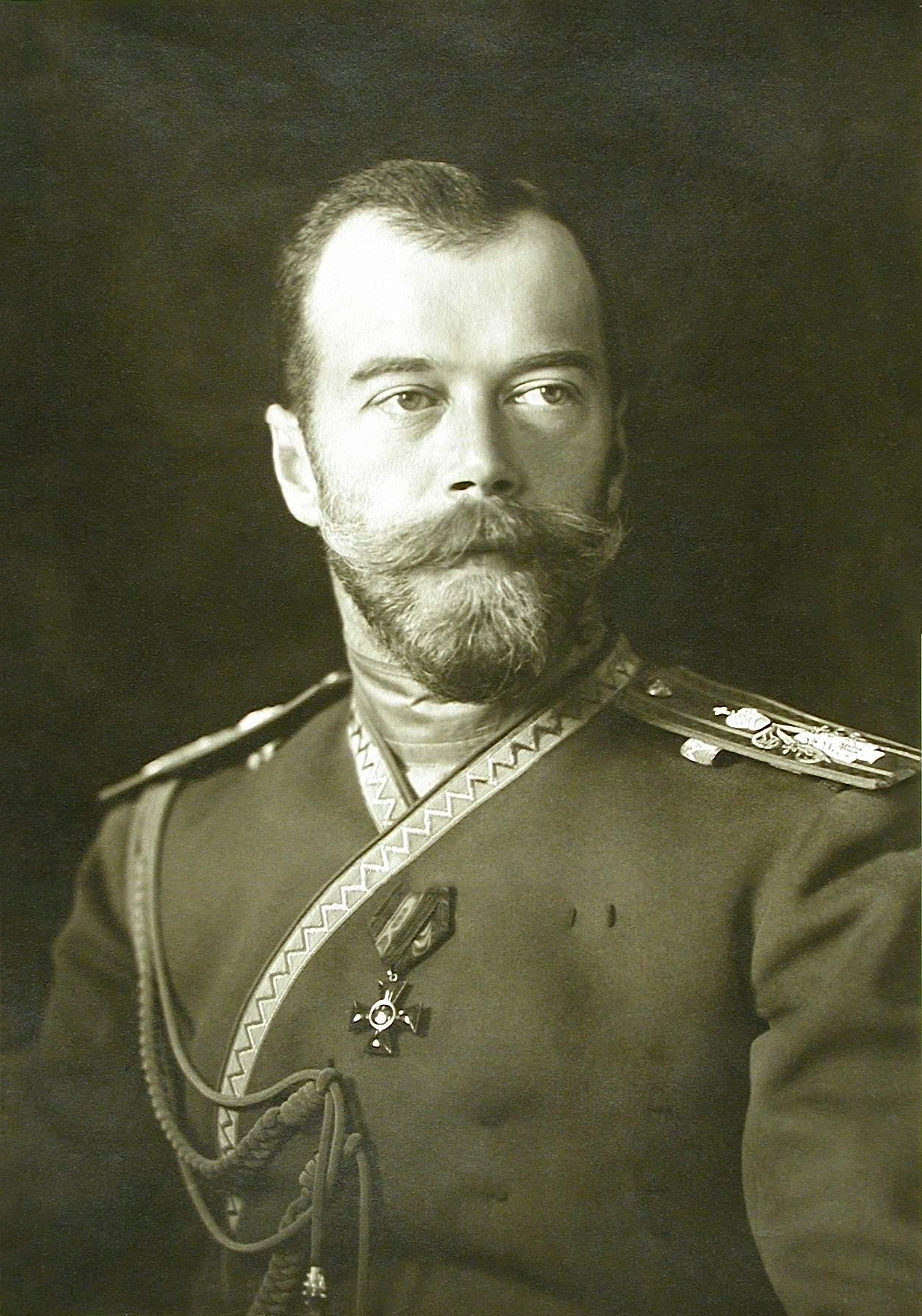
St. Nicholas II of Russia, Emperor of All Russia.

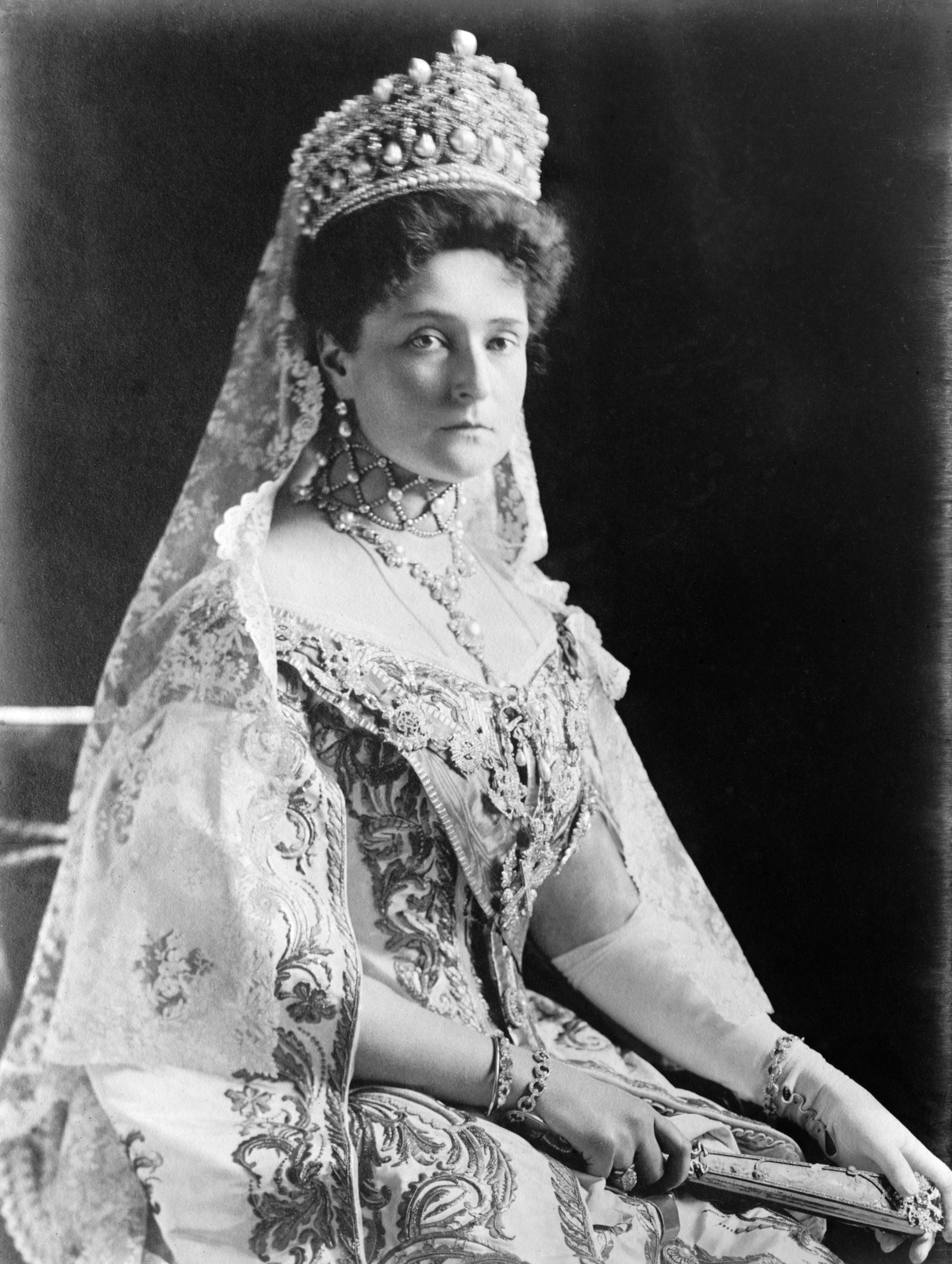
St. Alexandra, Empress of Russia.

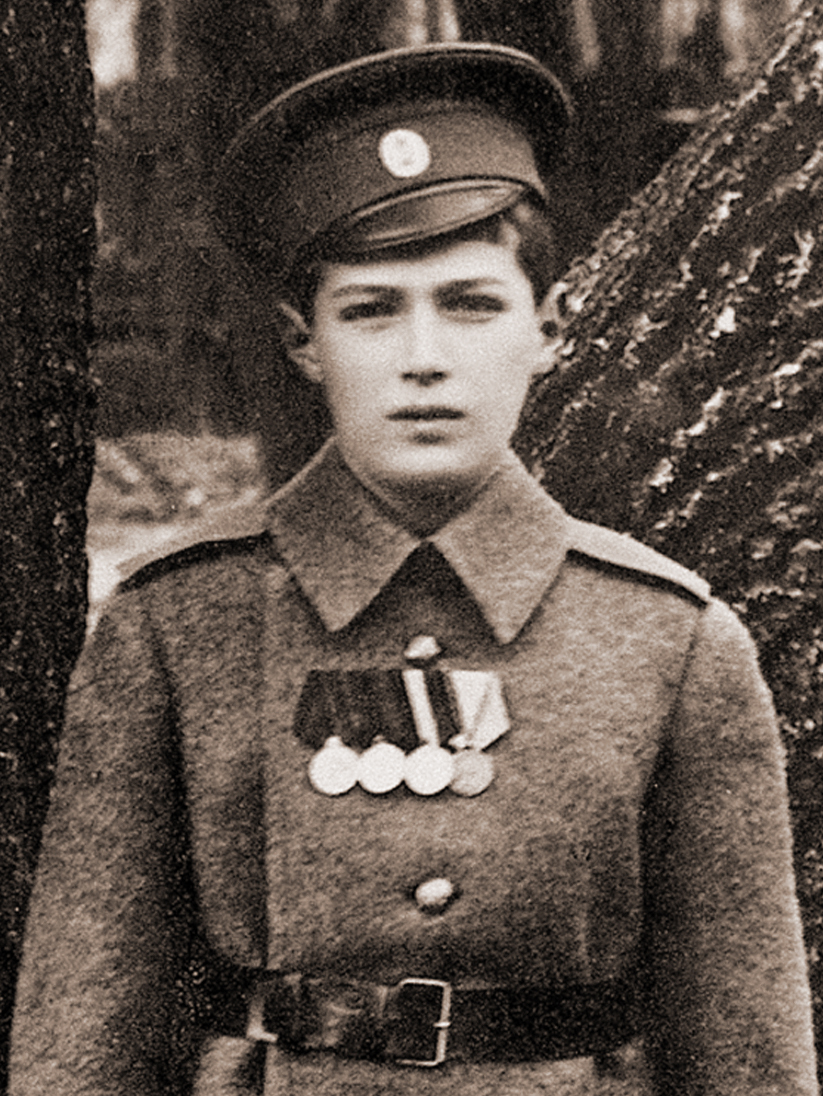
Tsesarevich Alexei in 1916.

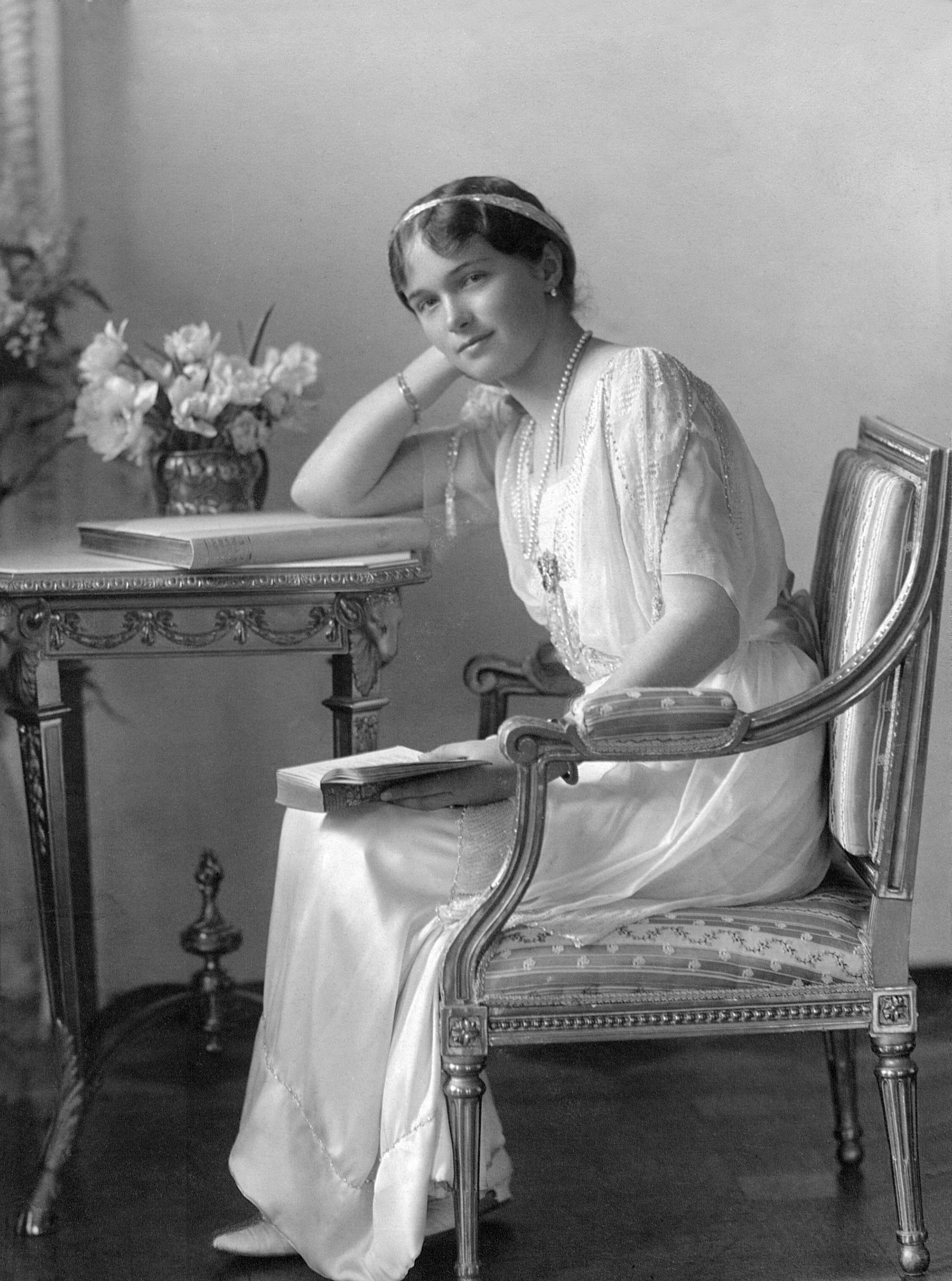
Grand Duchess Olga.

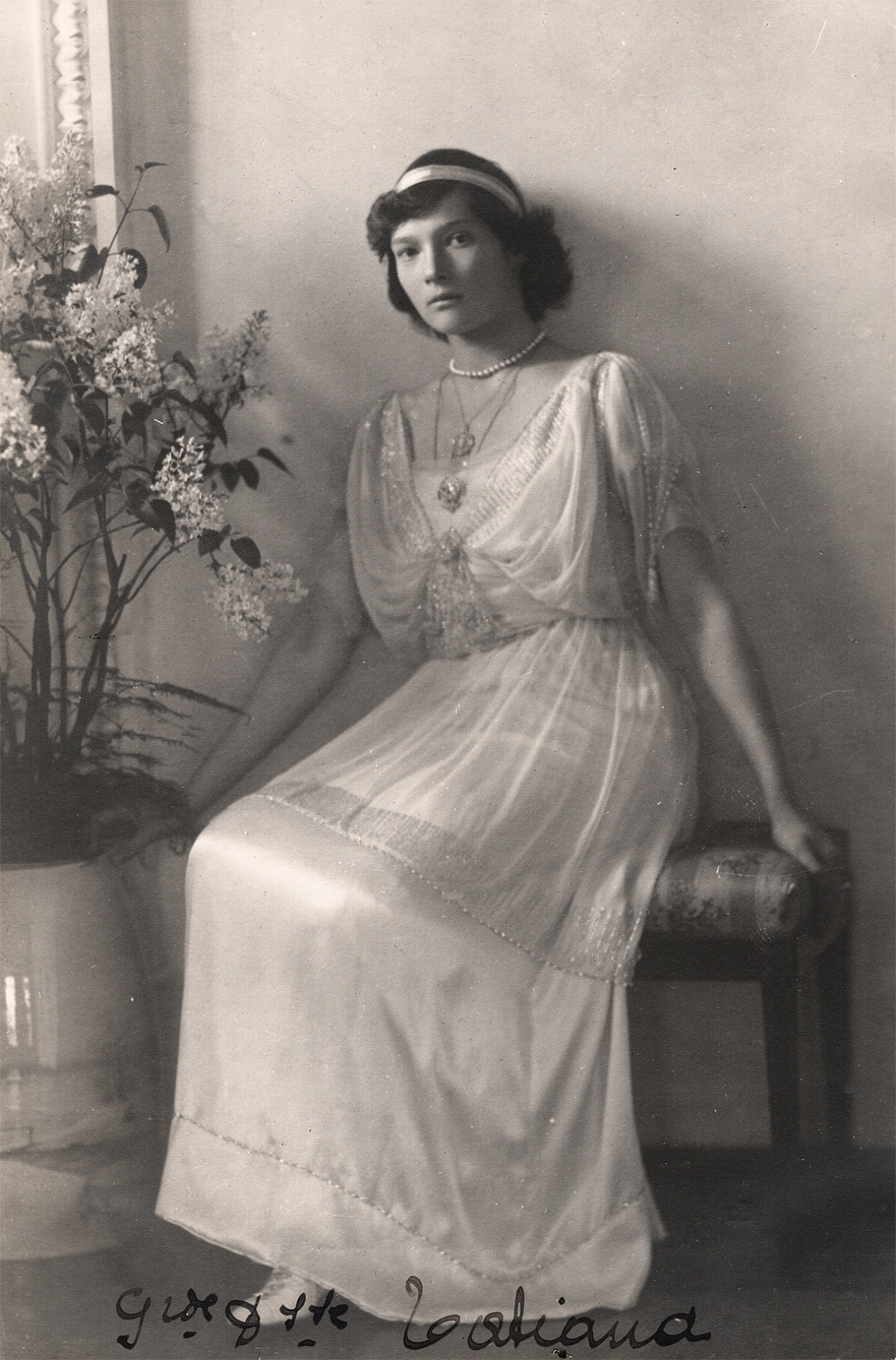
Grand Duchess Tatiana.

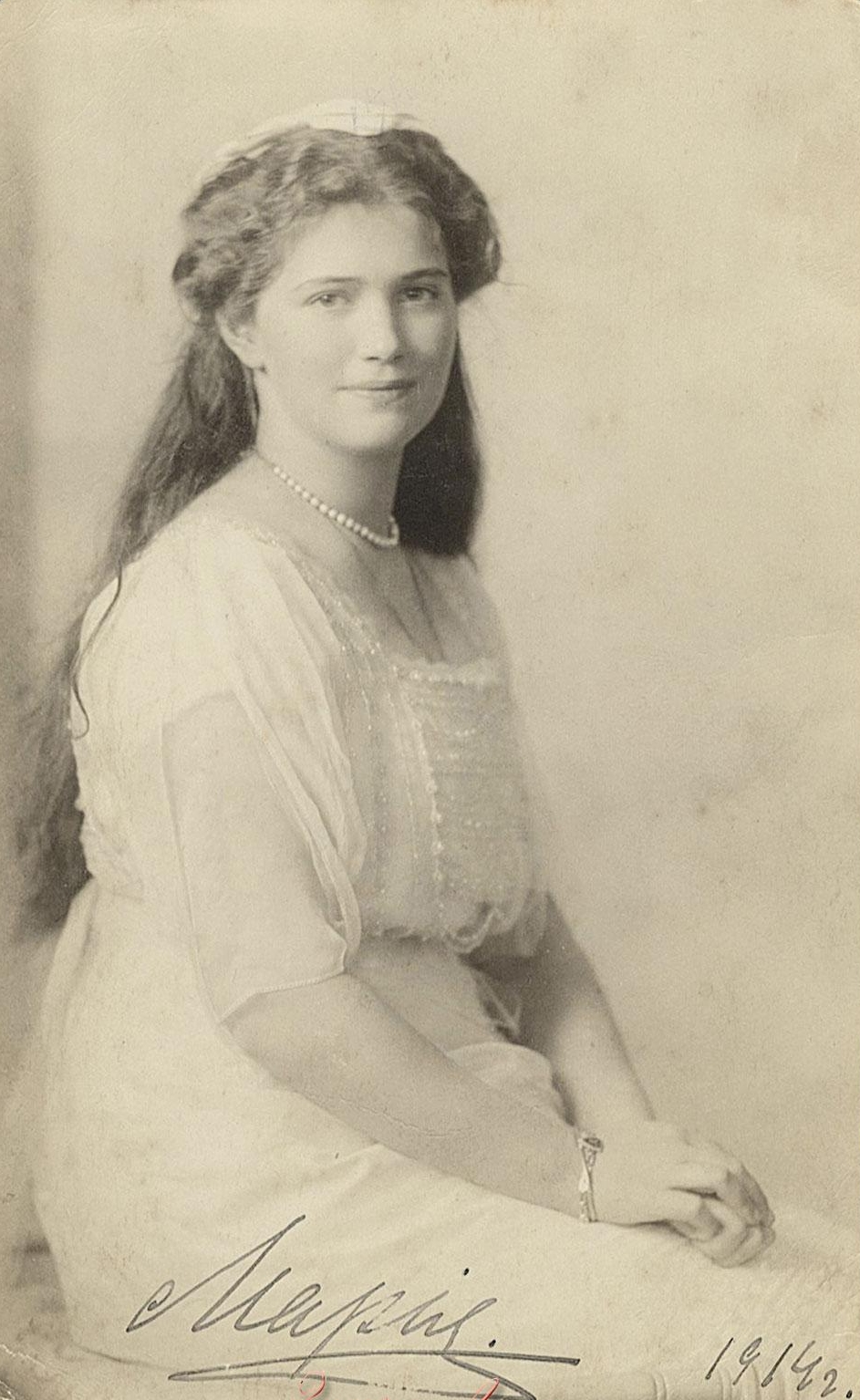
Grand Duchess Maria.

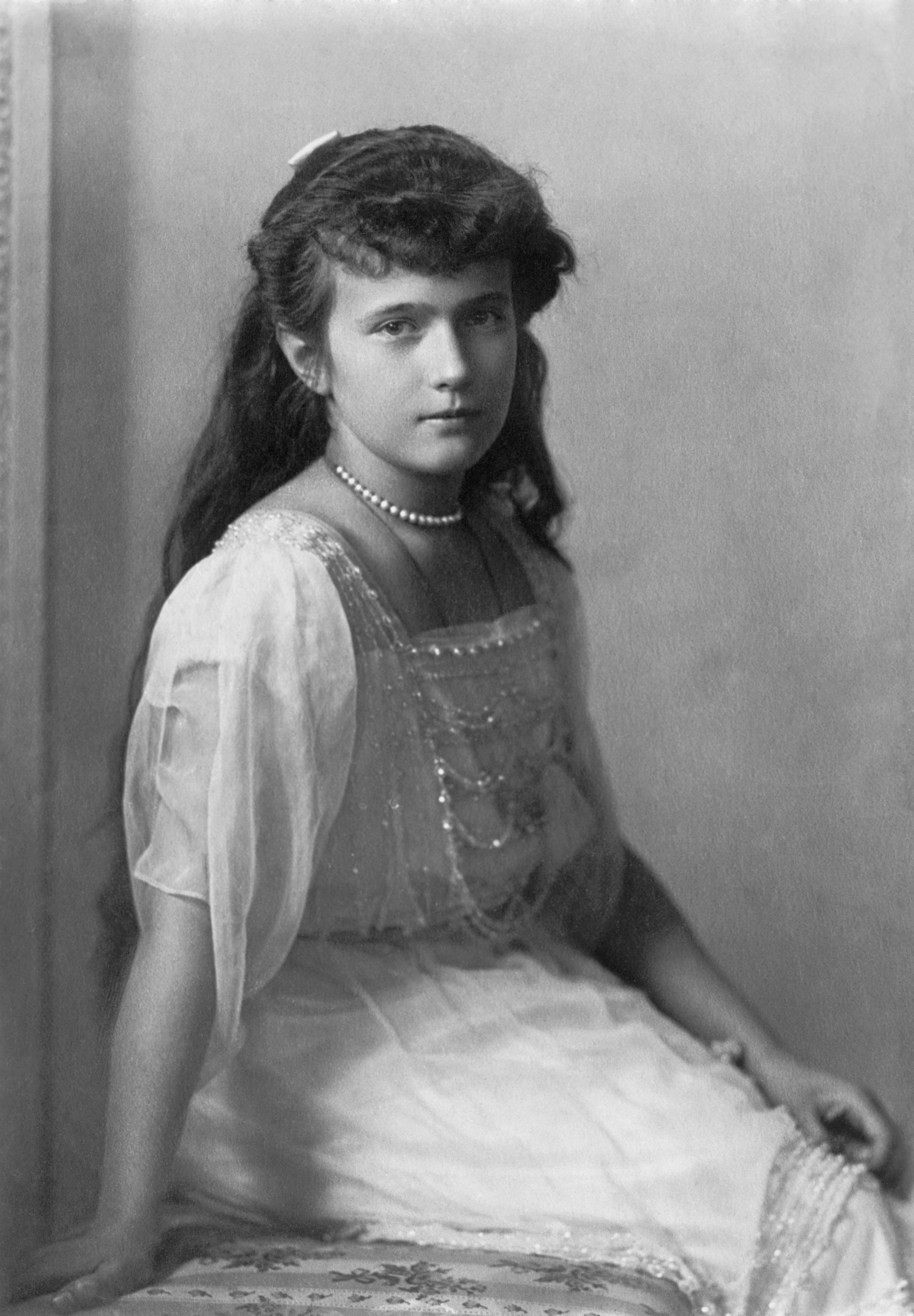
Grand Duchess Anastasia.

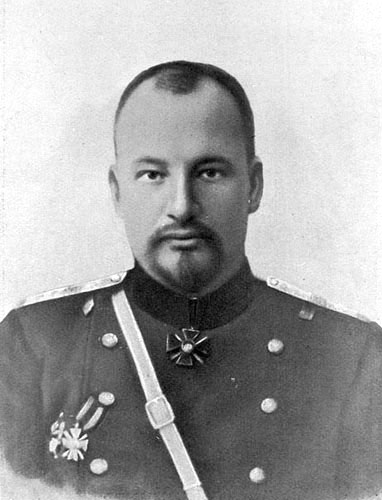
Passion bearer Eugene Botkin, physician.

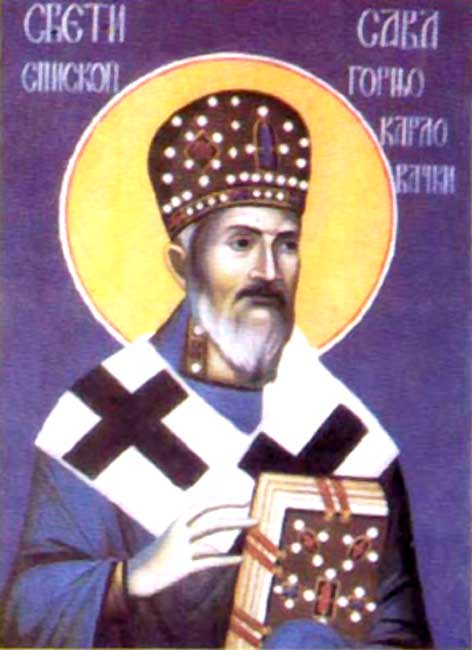
New Hieromartyr Sava (Trlajic), Bishop of Gornji Karlovac.

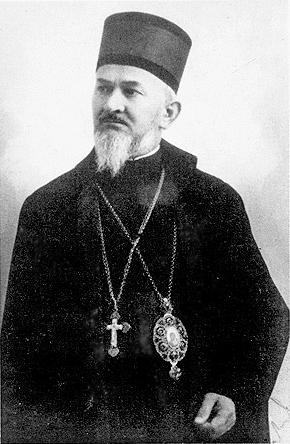
New Hieromartyr Sava (Trlajic), Bishop of Gornji Karlovac.

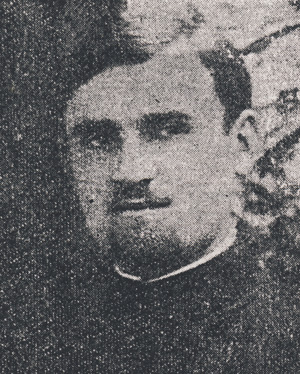
New Hieromartyr Đorđe Bogić, Priest, of Nasice.

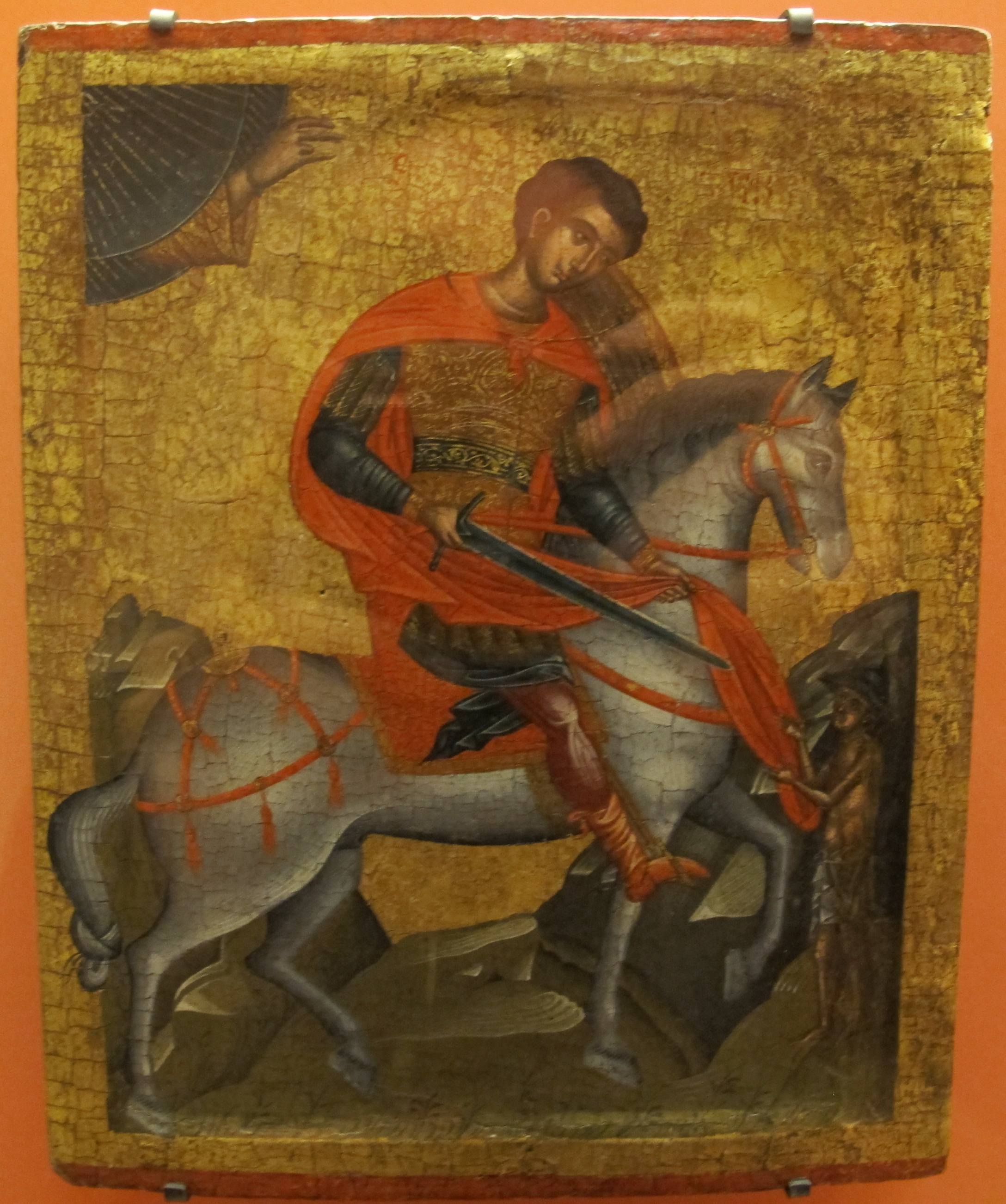
St. Martin the Merciful.

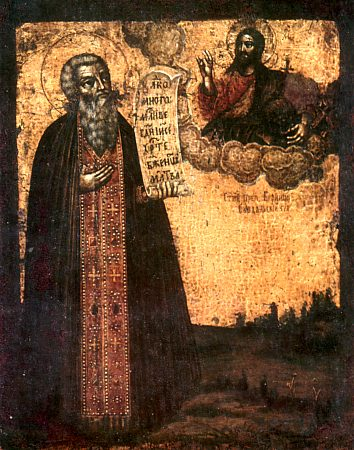
St. Euthymius the Wonderworker, Archimandrite, of Suzdal.

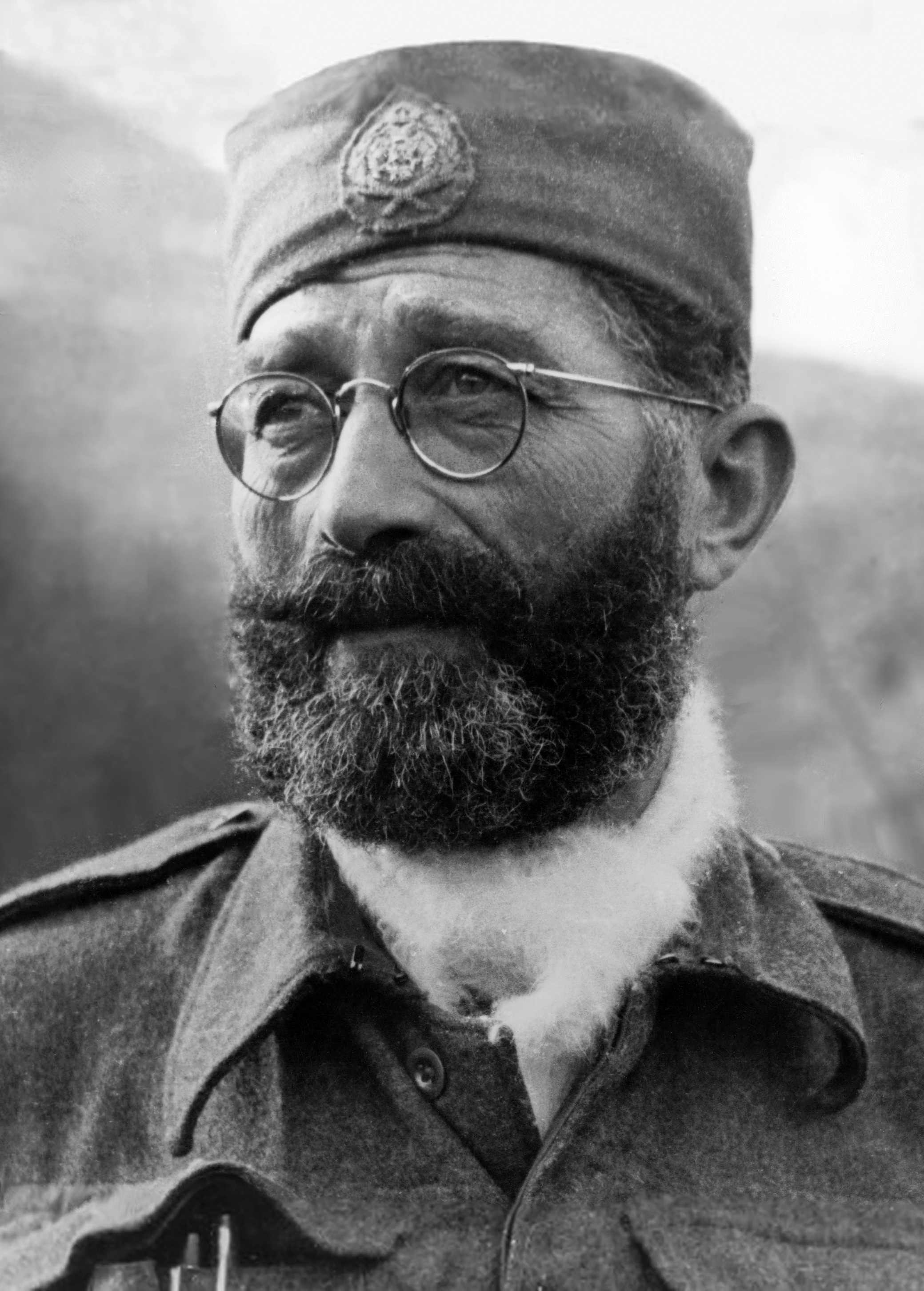
General Draža Mihailović of Serbia.

== Sources ==
- July 4/July 17. Orthodox Calendar (PRAVOSLAVIE.RU).
- July 17 / July 4. HOLY TRINITY RUSSIAN ORTHODOX CHURCH (A parish of the Patriarchate of Moscow).
- July 4. OCA - The Lives of the Saints.
- July 4. The Year of Our Salvation - Holy Transfiguration Monastery, Brookline, Massachusetts.
- The Autonomous Orthodox Metropolia of Western Europe and the Americas (ROCOR). St. Hilarion Calendar of Saints for the year of our Lord 2004. St. Hilarion Press (Austin, TX). p. 49.
- The Fourth Day of the Month of July. Orthodoxy in China.
- July 4. Latin Saints of the Orthodox Patriarchate of Rome.
- The Roman Martyrology. Transl. by the Archbishop of Baltimore. Last Edition, According to the Copy Printed at Rome in 1914. Revised Edition, with the Imprimatur of His Eminence Cardinal Gibbons. Baltimore: John Murphy Company, 1916. pp. 194–195.
- Rev. Richard Stanton. A Menology of England and Wales, or, Brief Memorials of the Ancient British and English Saints Arranged According to the Calendar, Together with the Martyrs of the 16th and 17th Centuries. London: Burns & Oates, 1892. pp. 306–309.

Greek Sources

- Great Synaxaristes: (in Greek) 4 ΙΟΥΛΙΟΥ. ΜΕΓΑΣ ΣΥΝΑΞΑΡΙΣΤΗΣ.
- (in Greek) Συναξαριστής. 4 Ιουλίου. ECCLESIA.GR. (H ΕΚΚΛΗΣΙΑ ΤΗΣ ΕΛΛΑΔΟΣ).
- (in Greek) ΙΟΥΛΙΟΣ. Αποστολική Διακονία της Εκκλησίας της Ελλάδος (Apostoliki Diakonia of the Church of Greece).
- (in Greek) 04/07/2018. Ορθόδοξος Συναξαριστής.

Russian Sources

- (in Russian) 17 июля (4 июля). Православная Энциклопедия под редакцией Патриарха Московского и всея Руси Кирилла (электронная версия). (Orthodox Encyclopedia - Pravenc.ru).
- (in Russian) 4 июля по старому стилю / 17 июля по новому стилю. Русская Православная Церковь - Православный церковный календарь на 2018 год.
- (in Russian) 4 июля (ст.ст.) 17 июля 2014 (нов. ст.). Русская Православная Церковь Отдел внешних церковных связей. (DECR).
