= Fragan =

Saint Fragan
- Born: Scotland
- Died: 5th century
- Venerated in: Catholic Church; Western Orthodoxy
- Feast: 3 October (in Brittany); 5 July (Catholic Church)

Fragan was a 5th-century pre-Congregational saint and Prince of Scotland. He is celebrated on 3 October in the Calendar of the Breton Saints, and shares with Gwen a feast day on 5 July in the Roman Calendar.

Fragan came from Great Britain, and was a Prince of Albany in Scotland. In the 5th century, he left Scotland to evangelize Armorica.

== Biography ==
=== Family background ===
He was the husband of Gwenn and father of the twins Jacut and Guethenoc, of Guénolé, and of Creirwy, Winwaloe, son of Prince Fragan (or Fracan) and Teirbron. He is also a cousin of Riwall and stepfather to Cadfan, son of Eneas Ledewig (or Aeneas of Brittany) and Teirbron.

=== Later life ===
He left Britain and moved to Ploufragan (Côtes-d'Armor) towards the end of the 4th century or perhaps as late as 418 AD. There, he settled in the Sang River valley. He was the founder of the castle of Lesguen, in the present commune of Plouguin.

Fragan is also known for having amassed a small army in haste to repel a larger force of pagan pirates at the battle of Lochrist.
