= Klervi =

Breton saint (born c. 475)

Saint Klervi
- Born: c. 475; Ploufragan, Armorica
- Feast: 3 October or 21 December
- Patronage: The blind

Klervi (Breton: Klerwi; French: Clervie; Latin: Creirvia; Welsh: Creirwy; born c. 475) was a 5th-century pre-Congregational saint from the Welsh settlement of Ploufragan in Armorica, later a part of Brittany and France.

== Lineage and life ==
=== Parentage, ancestry and flight ===
Klervi was the daughter of Prince Fragan (Fracan) and the Princess Gwen Teirbron (Gwen the Three Breasted), both also considered saints. Fragan's lineage is disputed; some sources claim he was the nephew of King Cadwy of Dumnonia and the son of Prince Selyf of Cornwall. In this scenario he would be the prince of Cornwall and the brother of Saint Cybi. That lineage places him as having inherited the Kingdom of Cornwall upon Selyf's death. Other sources claim that Fragan was the Prince of Albany in Scotland, although that claim is less corroborated. Gwen Teirbron was a Breton noblewoman and the daughter of Budic II of Brittany. Fragan was Gwen Teirbron's second husband, her first being Eaneas Lydewig, also called Eneas the Breton. Fragan accepted his stepson born from Gwen's first marriage as his own and so brought him to Brittany as part of his entourage.

The reason for Fragan and Gwen Teirbron's flight to Armorica is similarly debated. Some sources cite a plague believed to have broken out in Devon in 507 caused Fragan to bring his family and a large number of his subjects onto ships on the English Channel. From there they fled to Gwen's homeland in Brittany and were permitted to create a permanent settlement. Another claim is that the flight was in response to Brittonic defeats by the invading Anglo-Saxons. Many sources simply state that Fragan resolved to relocate his family.

Upon the party's landing in Armorica and subsequent settling in arable land, Gwen appealed to her father and the family gained an official claim to the territory on which they founded their settlement, so founding the still existing commune of Ploufragan.

=== Siblings ===
Klervi had three older brothers and an older half brother:

- Cadfan (Gideon), the overall eldest and her half-brother
- Jacut (James), her second or third brother
- Wethenoc (Gwethenoc, Guethenoc), her second or third brother
- Winwaloe, (Gwenole) the youngest of her brothers

All four of her brothers, as with her parents, are considered pre-congregation saints and all of the brothers were educated by Budoc of Dol. Jacut gained individual fame and is the namesake of numerous population centers including Saint-Jacut-de-la-Mer. Winwaloe is exceptionally famous throughout Breton, French, Welsh, Cornish, and English history and extending to the modern day for his piety and the fame of his abbey. Cadfan founded Tywyn, where he was the first abbot.

== Veneration ==
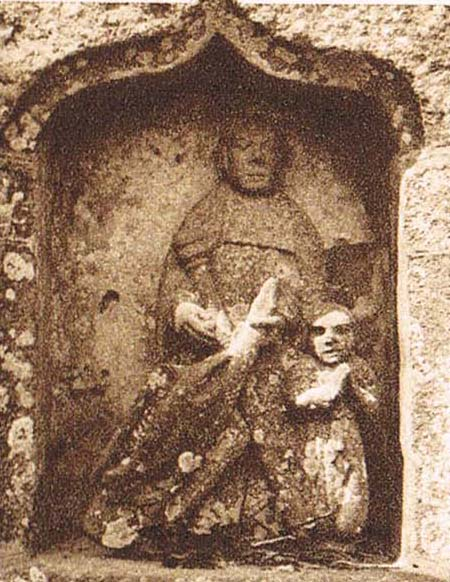
The fountain of St. Genoa in Saint-Frégant in Finistère which houses a statue depicting the miracle.

Referencing an incident in her childhood, Klervi frequently stated that she "owed her eye" to her much older brother, Winwaloe. More modern historians, particularly Sabine Baring-Gould, have concluded that the original story was likely that a Goose flew toward the very young Klervi and would have likely pecked her eye out without Winwaloe intervening. Baring-Gould concluded that over the centuries, the story was hyperbolized and morphed into something more miraculous.

The traditional story goes that Klervi was driving wild geese and one of the geese became aggressive and took either one or both of her eyes. Saint Winwaloe, who was praying in his monastery, was informed of the incident by an angel. Winwaloe returned home, grabbed the goose, cut its stomach open, pulled the eye(s) out and put it/them back into Klervi's eye socket(s). He then made the sign of the cross on it, and Klervi fully regained her sight and was "as beautiful as ever."

There is a statue of Klervi, Winwalo and the goose on the fountain of St. Genoa in Saint-Frégant in Finistère, and on the doors of the nearby church. The statue shows Winwaloe holding the goose in one hand and an eyeball in the other with the much younger Klervi standing at his side.
