= Plouguin =

Plouguin Plougin
- Commune
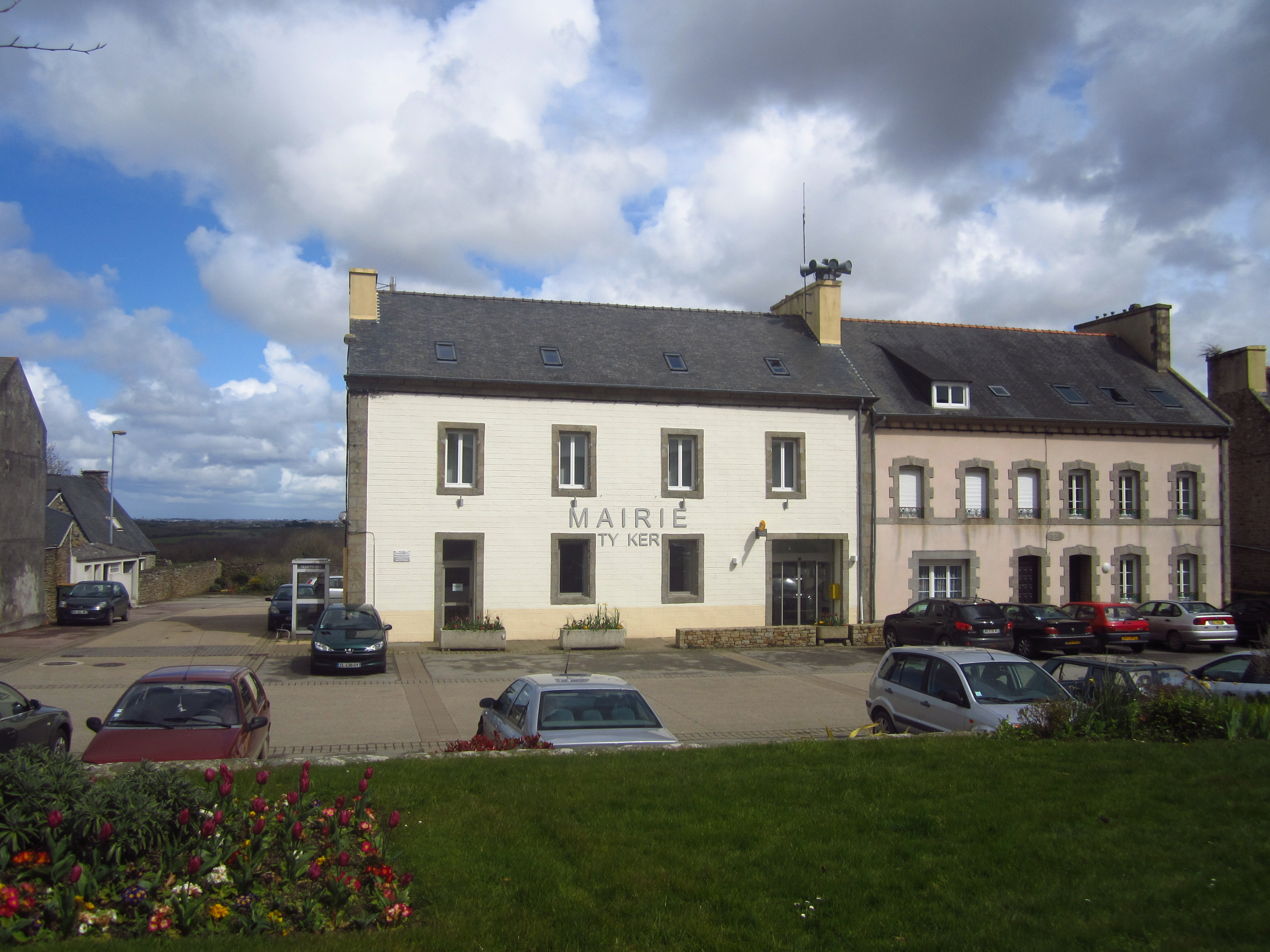
- The town hall in Plouguin

- Coat of arms
- Location of Plouguin
- Location within France Location within Brittany
- Coordinates: 48°31′31″N 4°36′00″W
- Country: France
- Region: Brittany
- Department: Finistère
- Arrondissement: Brest
- Canton: Plabennec

Government
  - Mayor (2020–2026): Roger Talarmain
- Area^{1}: 31.02 km^{2} (11.98 sq mi)
- Highest elevation: 82 m (269 ft)
- Lowest elevation: 0 m (0 ft)
- Population (2023): 2,268
  - Density: 73.11/km^{2} (189.4/sq mi)
- Time zone: UTC+01:00 (CET)
  - Summer (DST): UTC+02:00 (CEST)
- INSEE/Postal code: 29196 /29830
- ^{1} French Land Register data, which excludes lakes, ponds, glaciers > 1 km^{2} (0.386 sq mi or 247 acres) and river estuaries.

Plouguin (French pronunciation: [pluɡɛ̃]; Breton: Plougin) is a commune in the Finistère department of Brittany in north-western France.

It lies 20 km (12 mi) northwest of Brest, about 7 km (4.3 mi) from the English Channel in the far west of the Leon peninsula.

== Population ==
Inhabitants of Plouguin are called in French Plouguinois.

Historical population
Year	Pop.	±% p.a.
1968	1,418	—
1975	1,373	−0.46%
1982	1,920	+4.91%
1990	2,060	+0.88%
1999	1,955	−0.58%
2007	2,050	+0.59%
2012	2,121	+0.68%
2017	2,151	+0.28%
2023	2,268	+0.89%
Source: INSEE

== Saint Winwaloe ==
Plouguin is considered to have been (about 460) the birthplace of Saint Winwaloe, and his supposed place of birth, a feudal hillock, is still pointed out.

== International relations ==
Plouguin is twinned with the town of Newport in Pembrokeshire, Wales.

== See also ==
- Communes of the Finistère department
