= Jacut =

Jacut was a 5th-century Cornish Saint who worked in Brittany. He is commemorated liturgically on 6 February.

His father was Fragan, a prince of Dumnonia, and his mother was Gwen Teirbron. The young family had fled to Brittany to avoid the plague raging in Cornwall at that time, and so grew up in Ploufragan near Saint-Brieuc with his brothers, Winwaloe and Wethenoc, and a sister, Creirwy. He was educated by Budoc of Dol on the Île Lavret near Paimpol, and as an adult he founded churches in Brittany.

Today, he is memorialised in the towns of Saint-Jacut-les-Pins, Saint-Jacut-du-Mené, Saint-Jacut-de-la-Mer, and the Abbey of Saint-Jacut in that town.

== Gallery ==
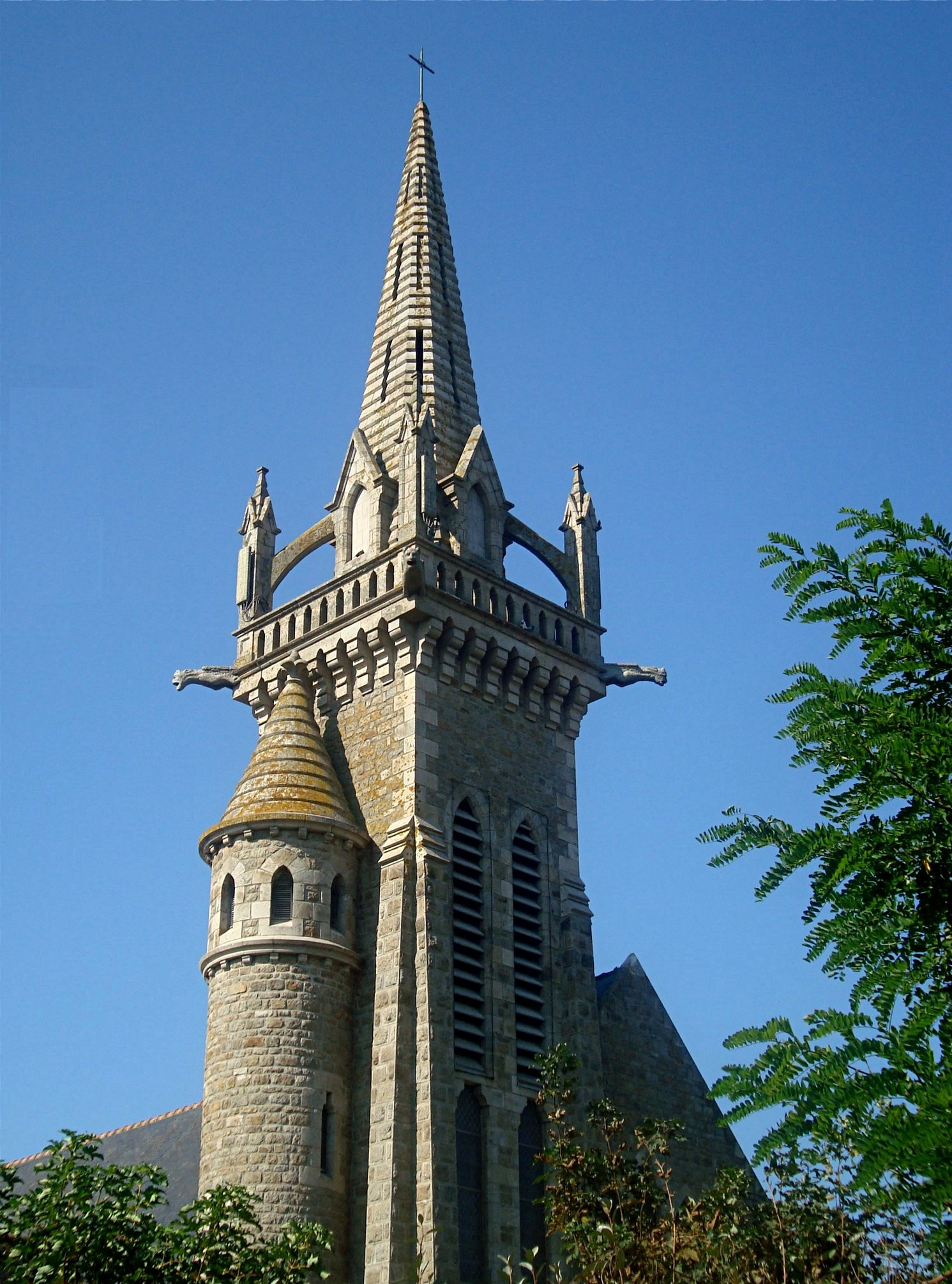
St Jacuts Abbey Saint-Jacut-de-la-Mer

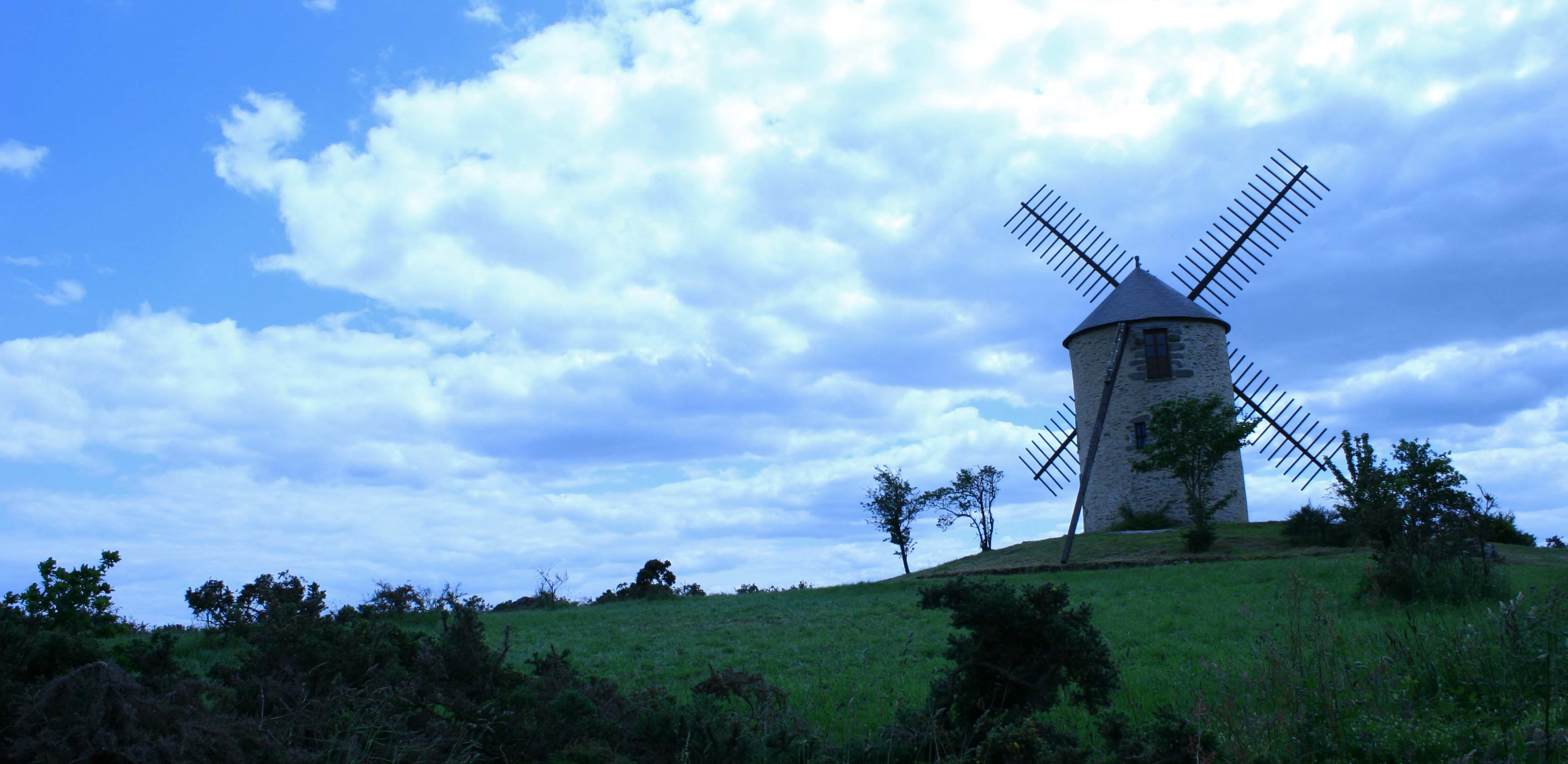
Butte des Moulins at Saint-Jacut-du-Mené

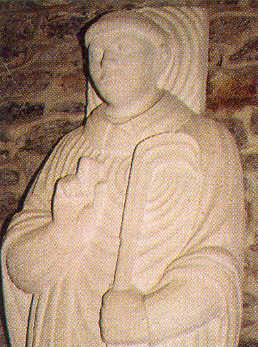
St-jacut statue.
