= Zoe of Rome =

Ancient Roman noblewoman and pre-Congregation Christian martyr

Saint Zoe of Rome
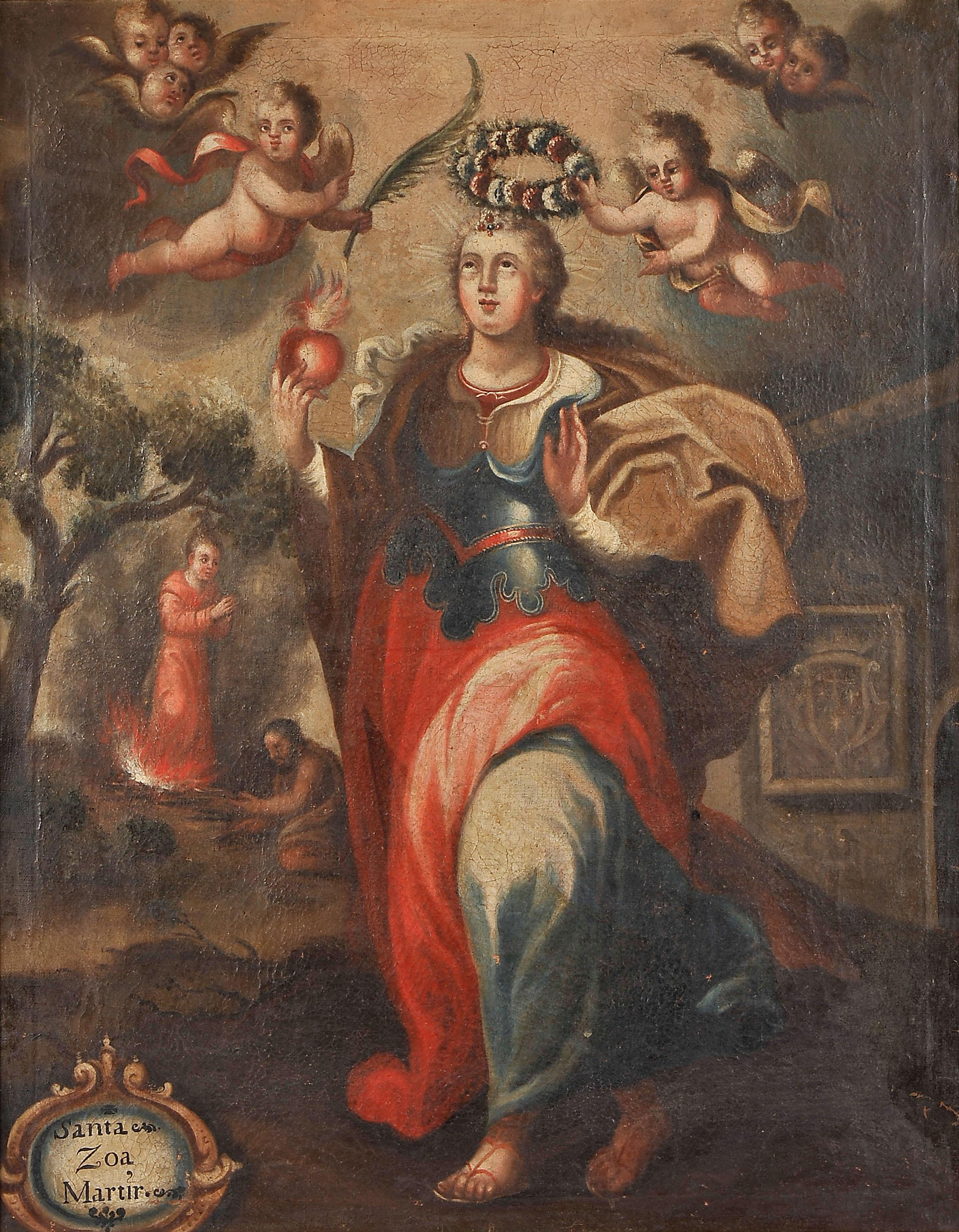
- Saint Zoe, Martyr (18th-century, Portuguese)

Martyr
- Born: not known
- Died: c. 286
- Venerated in: Roman Catholic Church; Eastern Orthodox Church
- Canonized: Pre-Congregation
- Feast: July 5

Saint Zoe of Rome (died c. 286) was a noblewoman, married to Nicostratus, a high Roman court official.

For six years she had been unable to speak. Saint Sebastian made the sign of the cross over the woman, and she immediately began to speak and she glorified Jesus. Zoe asked for baptism. She lived during the reign of Emperor Diocletian and his early persecution of Christians.

She was greatly devoted to Saint Peter, and was discovered praying by his tomb when she was arrested for her faith. She died, stifled by smoke, hung over a fire. Her body then was thrown into the River Tiber.

She is considered a saint in the Roman Catholic Church and Eastern Orthodox Church and has a feast day of 5 July in both, although she is also venerated by the Eastern Orthodox Church on 18 December along with Saint Sebastian and other martyrs.
