= Wethenoc =

5th-century Breton saint

Wethenoc or Gwethenoc or Guethenoc was a 5th-century pre-congregational Breton saint.

== Life ==
A son of Prince Fragan of Dumnonia and Saint Gwen the Three-Breasted of Brittany, he grew up at Ploufragan near Saint-Brieuc (in northwestern France) with his brothers, Winwaloe and Jacut. They were later joined by a sister, Creirwy. He was educated by Budoc of Dol on the Île Lavret near Paimpol. Wethenoc was also the half brother of Cadfan.
