= Gwen Teirbron =

Sixth-century Breton saint

Saint Gwen Teirbron
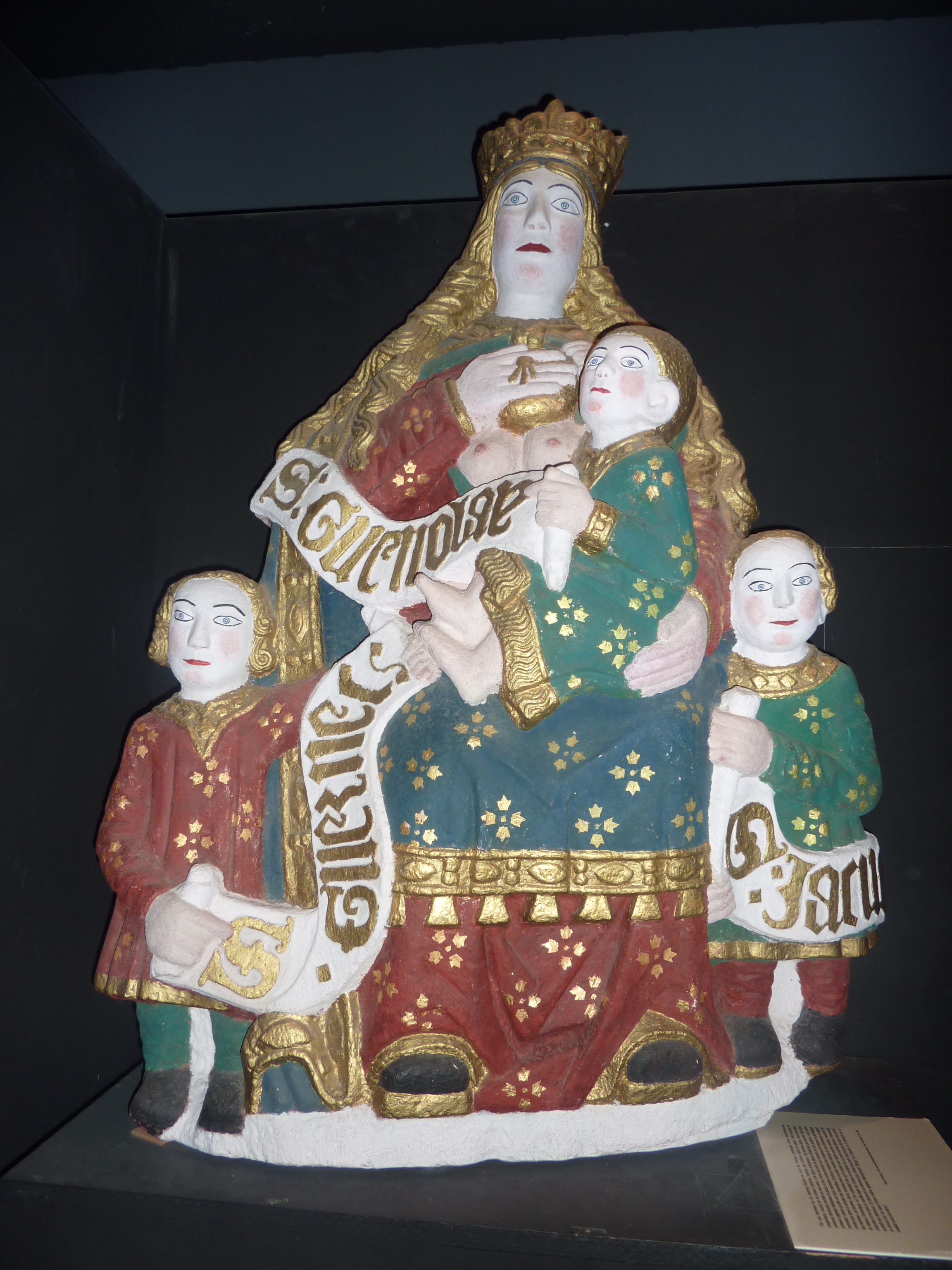
- Born: Brittany
- Died: 5th or 6th century
- Venerated in: Catholic Church; Russian Orthodox Church Abroad
- Feast: 3 October (Catholic Church); 18 July (Russian Orthodox Church Abroad)

Gwen Teirbron (French: Blanche; Latin: Alba Trimammis or Candida; possibly English: Wite) was a Breton holy woman and wife of Fragan who supposedly lived in the 5th or 6th century. Her epithet is Welsh for '(of the) three breasts'.

== Veneration ==
Popular devotion interpreted Gwen's unusual physical and spiritual fecundity by God's gift to her of a third breast. Her iconography followed suit. Gwen is invoked for women's fertility. She is commemorated on 3 October in the Roman Catholic Church (although this has been transferred from Saint Candidus of Rome), and on 18 July (NS) by the Russian Orthodox Church Abroad in Australia.

== Children ==
- Winwaloe, son of Prince Fragan (or Fracan) and Teirbron
- Jacut (or James), son of Prince Fragan and Teirbron
- Wethenoc (or Gwethenoc or Guethenoc), son of Prince Fragan and Teirbron
- Creirwy (or Creirvy or Klervi), daughter of Prince Fragan and Teirbron
- Cadfan, son of Eneas Ledewig (or Aeneas of Brittany) and Teirbron
