= Winwaloe =

Breton abbot and saint (c. 460–532)

Saint Winwaloe
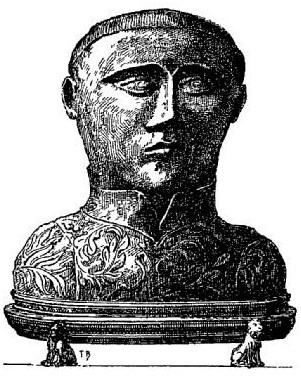
- Portrait of a silver bust of Saint Guénolé, 1901
- Died: 3 March 532; Landévennec Abbey
- Venerated in: Eastern Orthodox Church; Catholic Church
- Feast: 3 March
- Patronage: Fertility

Winwaloe (Breton: Gwenole; French: Guénolé; Latin: Winwallus or Winwalœus; c. 460 – 3 March 532) was the founder and first abbot of Landévennec Abbey (literally "Lann of Venec"), also known as the Monastery of Winwaloe. It was just south of Brest in Brittany, now part of France.

== Life ==
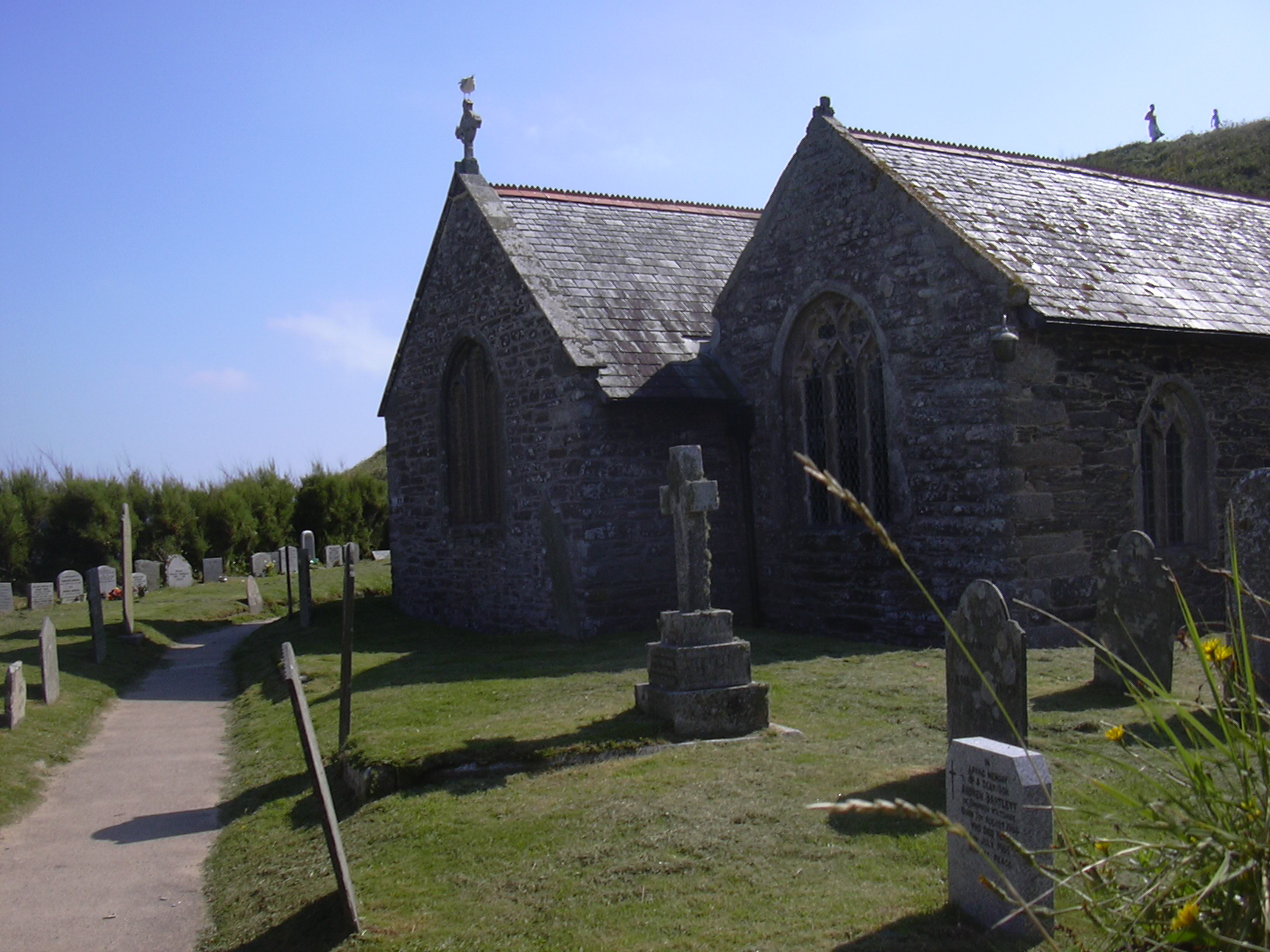
St Winwaloe's Church, Gunwalloe

Winwaloe was the son of Fragan (or Fracan), a prince of Dumnonia, and his wife Gwen the Three-Breasted, who had fled to Brittany to avoid the plague.

Winwaloe was born about 460, apparently at Plouguin, near Saint-Pabu, where his supposed place of birth, a feudal hillock, can still be seen. Winwaloe grew up in Ploufragan near Saint-Brieuc with his brother Wethenoc, and his brother Jacut. They were later joined by a sister, Creirwy, and still later by half-brother Cadfan. He was educated by Budoc of Dol on Lavret island in the Bréhat archipelago near Paimpol.

As a young man Winwaloe conceived a wish to visit Ireland to see the remains of Saint Patrick, who had just died. However, the saint appeared to him in a dream to say that it would be better to remain in Brittany and found an abbey. So, with eleven of Budoc's other disciples, he set up a small monastery on the Île de Tibidy, at the mouth of the Faou. However it was so inhospitable that after three years, he miraculously opened a passage through the sea to found another abbey on the opposite bank of the Landévennec estuary.

Winwaloe died at his monastery on 3 March 532.

== Veneration ==
Winwaloe was venerated as a saint at Landévennec until Viking invasions in 914 forced the monks to flee, with his body, to Château-du-Loir and then Montreuil-sur-Mer. His relics were often taken on procession through the town.

Winwaloe's shrine was destroyed during the French Revolution in 1793.

He apparently acquired a priapic reputation through confusion of his name with the word gignere (French engendrer, "to beget") and was thus a patron of fertility as one of the phallic saints. He is also the patron of Saint-Guénolé in Penmarch, Finistère.

In Cornwall, Winwaloe is the patron of the churches at Tremaine, St Wynwallow's Church, Landewednack, Gunwalloe and Poundstock as well as East Portlemouth in Devon and two lost chapels in Wales. His feast day is 28 April and Gunwalloe feast is celebrated on the last Sunday of April. The churches of St Twynnells, near Pembroke, Pembrokeshire and Wonastow, Monmouthshire may have been originally dedicated to him. They were probably founded by his successor at Landévennec, Gwenhael, who certainly made trips to Great Britain. Exeter Cathedral, Glastonbury Abbey, Abingdon Abbey and Waltham Abbey Church held small relics. He was also popular in East Anglia where the abbey at Montreuil had a daughter house; St Winwaloe Priory in Norfolk was dedicated to him.

== See also ==
- Ys

== Main sources ==
- Butler, Alban (1815), The Lives of the Fathers, Martyrs, and Other Principal Saints: Compiled from Original Monuments and Other Authentic Records, Illustrated with the Remarks of Judicious Modern Critics and Historians, J. Murphy, archived from the original on 24 July 2021
- Doble, Gilbert H. (1962). The Saints of Cornwall Part II. Truro: Dean and Chapter of Truro. pp. 59–108.
- Latouche, Robert (1911). Mélanges d'histoire de Cornouaille (VI-XI siècle). Paris: Honoré Champion. (Bibliothèque de l'école pratique des hautes études, Vol. 192), pp. 2–39. (showing that the documents and the life are forgeries)
- Ranbeck, Father Aegedius, O.S.B (1896), Father J. Alphonsus Morrall, O.S.B. (ed.), Saints of the Order of Saint Benedict, January, February, March, translated by J P Molohan, M.A., London, England, archived from the original on 24 July 2021 – via CatholicSaints.info
