= Ploufragan =

Ploufragan Ploufragan (Breton)
- Commune
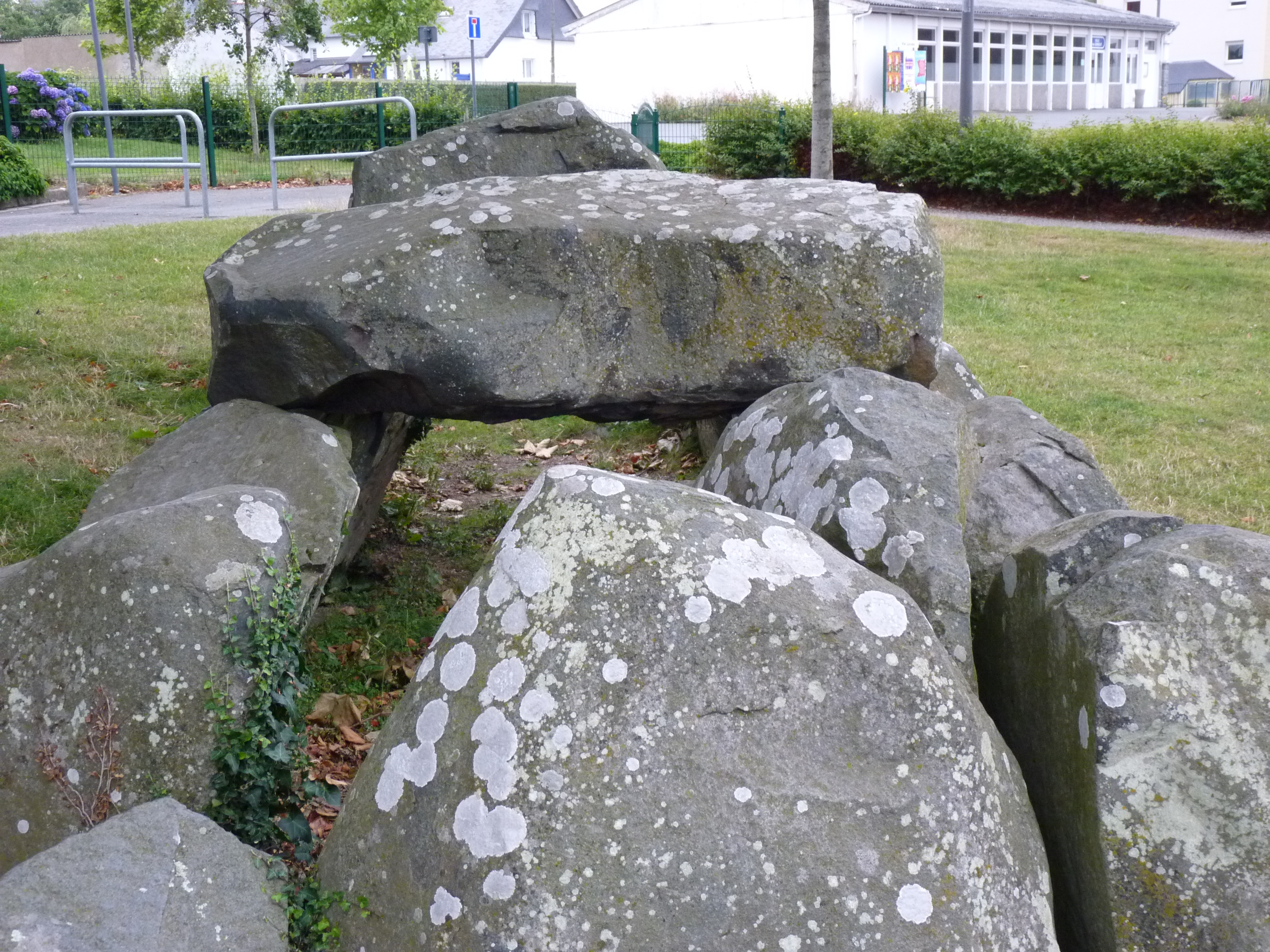
- The allée couverte of Le Grimolet, in Ploufragan

- Coat of arms
- Location of Ploufragan
- Location within France Location within Brittany
- Coordinates: 48°29′24″N 2°47′38″W
- Country: France
- Region: Brittany
- Department: Côtes-d'Armor
- Arrondissement: Saint-Brieuc
- Canton: Ploufragan
- Intercommunality: Saint-Brieuc Armor

Government
  - Mayor (2020–2026): Rémy Moulin
- Area^{1}: 27.06 km^{2} (10.45 sq mi)
- Highest elevation: 181 m (594 ft)
- Lowest elevation: 0 m (0 ft)
- Population (2023): 11,507
  - Density: 425.2/km^{2} (1,101/sq mi)
- Time zone: UTC+01:00 (CET)
  - Summer (DST): UTC+02:00 (CEST)
- INSEE/Postal code: 22215 /22440
- ^{1} French Land Register data, which excludes lakes, ponds, glaciers > 1 km^{2} (0.386 sq mi or 247 acres) and river estuaries.

Ploufragan (French pronunciation: [plufʁaɡɑ̃]; Breton: Ploufragan) is a commune in the Côtes-d'Armor department of Brittany in northwestern France.

Ploufragan lies adjacent to the southwest of Saint-Brieuc, the prefecture and largest city of Côtes-d'Armor.

== Population ==
Inhabitants of Ploufragan are called ploufraganais in French.

Historical population

Year	Pop.	±% p.a.
1793	2,020	—
1800	1,852	−1.23%
1806	1,969	+1.03%
1821	2,252	+0.90%
1831	2,581	+1.37%
1836	2,467	−0.90%
1841	2,458	−0.07%
1846	2,596	+1.10%
1851	2,493	−0.81%
1856	2,536	+0.34%
1861	2,494	−0.33%
1866	2,604	+0.87%
1872	2,573	−0.20%
1876	2,642	+0.66%
1881	2,785	+1.06%
1886	2,793	+0.06%
1891	2,904	+0.78%
1896	2,779	−0.88%
1901	2,733	−0.33%

Year	Pop.	±% p.a.
1906	2,716	−0.12%
1911	2,720	+0.03%
1921	2,685	−0.13%
1926	2,785	+0.73%
1931	2,904	+0.84%
1936	3,131	+1.52%
1946	3,259	+0.40%
1954	3,511	+0.94%
1962	4,022	+1.71%
1968	5,109	+4.07%
1975	8,395	+7.35%
1982	10,289	+2.95%
1990	10,583	+0.35%
1999	10,579	−0.00%
2007	10,832	+0.30%
2012	11,346	+0.93%
2017	11,546	+0.35%
2023	11,507	−0.06%

Source: EHESS and INSEE (1968–2023)

== See also ==
- Communes of the Côtes-d'Armor department
