= Plomodiern =

Plomodiern Ploudiern
- Commune
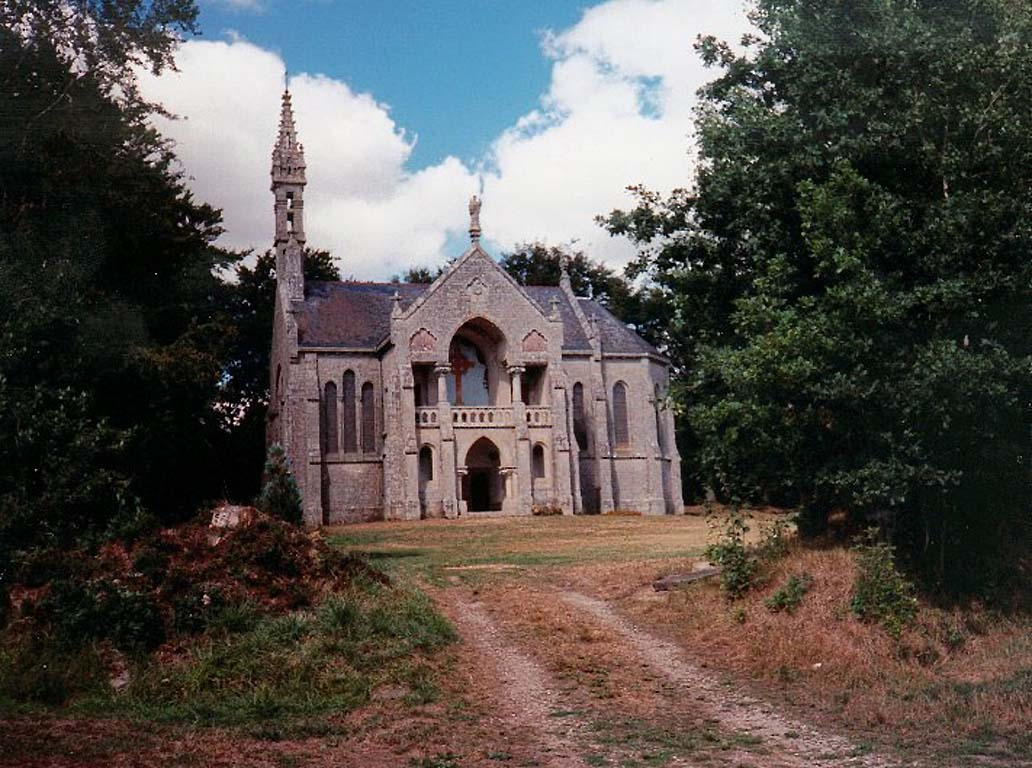
- Chapel of Saint Corentin, Plomodiern

- Coat of arms
- Location of Plomodiern
- Location within France Location within Brittany
- Coordinates: 48°10′55″N 4°13′50″W
- Country: France
- Region: Brittany
- Department: Finistère
- Arrondissement: Châteaulin
- Canton: Crozon
- Intercommunality: Pleyben-Châteaulin-Porzay

Government
  - Mayor (2020–2026): Joël Blaize
- Area^{1}: 46.74 km^{2} (18.05 sq mi)
- Highest elevation: 249 m (817 ft)
- Lowest elevation: 0 m (0 ft)
- Population (2023): 2,282
  - Density: 48.82/km^{2} (126.5/sq mi)
- Time zone: UTC+01:00 (CET)
  - Summer (DST): UTC+02:00 (CEST)
- INSEE/Postal code: 29172 /29550
- ^{1} French Land Register data, which excludes lakes, ponds, glaciers > 1 km^{2} (0.386 sq mi or 247 acres) and river estuaries.

Plomodiern (French pronunciation: [plɔmɔdjɛʁn]; Breton: Ploudiern) is a commune in the Finistère department of Brittany in north-western France.

== Geography ==
=== Climate ===
Plomodiern has an oceanic climate (Köppen climate classification Cfb). The average annual temperature in Plomodiern is 11.9 °C (53.4 °F). The average annual rainfall is 1,117.8 mm (44.01 in) with December as the wettest month. The temperatures are highest on average in July, at around 17.8 °C (64.0 °F), and lowest in February, at around 6.9 °C (44.4 °F). The highest temperature ever recorded in Plomodiern was 36.6 °C (97.9 °F) on 9 August 2003; the coldest temperature ever recorded was −10.3 °C (13.5 °F) on 13 January 1987.

Climate data for Plomodiern (1981–2010 averages, extremes 1982−present)
Month	Jan	Feb	Mar	Apr	May	Jun	Jul	Aug	Sep	Oct	Nov	Dec	Year
Record high °C (°F)	17.0 (62.6)	18.6 (65.5)	23.0 (73.4)	26.4 (79.5)	29.7 (85.5)	33.3 (91.9)	34.8 (94.6)	36.6 (97.9)	31.0 (87.8)	27.2 (81.0)	19.5 (67.1)	17.4 (63.3)	36.6 (97.9)
Mean daily maximum °C (°F)	9.9 (49.8)	10.2 (50.4)	12.3 (54.1)	14.4 (57.9)	17.6 (63.7)	20.5 (68.9)	22.4 (72.3)	22.4 (72.3)	20.3 (68.5)	16.7 (62.1)	12.9 (55.2)	10.5 (50.9)	15.9 (60.6)
Daily mean °C (°F)	6.9 (44.4)	6.9 (44.4)	8.6 (47.5)	10.1 (50.2)	13.3 (55.9)	16.0 (60.8)	17.8 (64.0)	17.7 (63.9)	15.7 (60.3)	12.9 (55.2)	9.5 (49.1)	7.4 (45.3)	11.9 (53.4)
Mean daily minimum °C (°F)	3.9 (39.0)	3.5 (38.3)	4.9 (40.8)	5.9 (42.6)	9.0 (48.2)	11.4 (52.5)	13.2 (55.8)	13.0 (55.4)	11.1 (52.0)	9.2 (48.6)	6.1 (43.0)	4.4 (39.9)	8.0 (46.4)
Record low °C (°F)	−10.3 (13.5)	−8.0 (17.6)	−7.6 (18.3)	−3.0 (26.6)	−0.7 (30.7)	3.0 (37.4)	4.8 (40.6)	2.0 (35.6)	2.7 (36.9)	−2.3 (27.9)	−4.0 (24.8)	−6.6 (20.1)	−10.3 (13.5)
Average precipitation mm (inches)	135.5 (5.33)	102.5 (4.04)	85.9 (3.38)	80.0 (3.15)	81.6 (3.21)	52.8 (2.08)	57.8 (2.28)	61.3 (2.41)	77.9 (3.07)	117.9 (4.64)	127.1 (5.00)	137.5 (5.41)	1,117.8 (44.01)
Average precipitation days (≥ 1.0 mm)	15.9	12.5	12.9	11.9	10.7	8.3	9.3	9.1	9.9	14.6	15.5	15.6	146.3
Source: Meteociel

== Population ==
Inhabitants of Plomodiern are called in French Plomodiernois. The village is located next to the Menez Hom.

Historical population
Year	Pop.	±% p.a.
1968	2,099	—
1975	1,922	−1.25%
1982	1,963	+0.30%
1990	1,912	−0.33%
1999	2,076	+0.92%
2007	2,142	+0.39%
2012	2,194	+0.48%
2017	2,136	−0.53%
2023	2,282	+1.11%
Source: INSEE

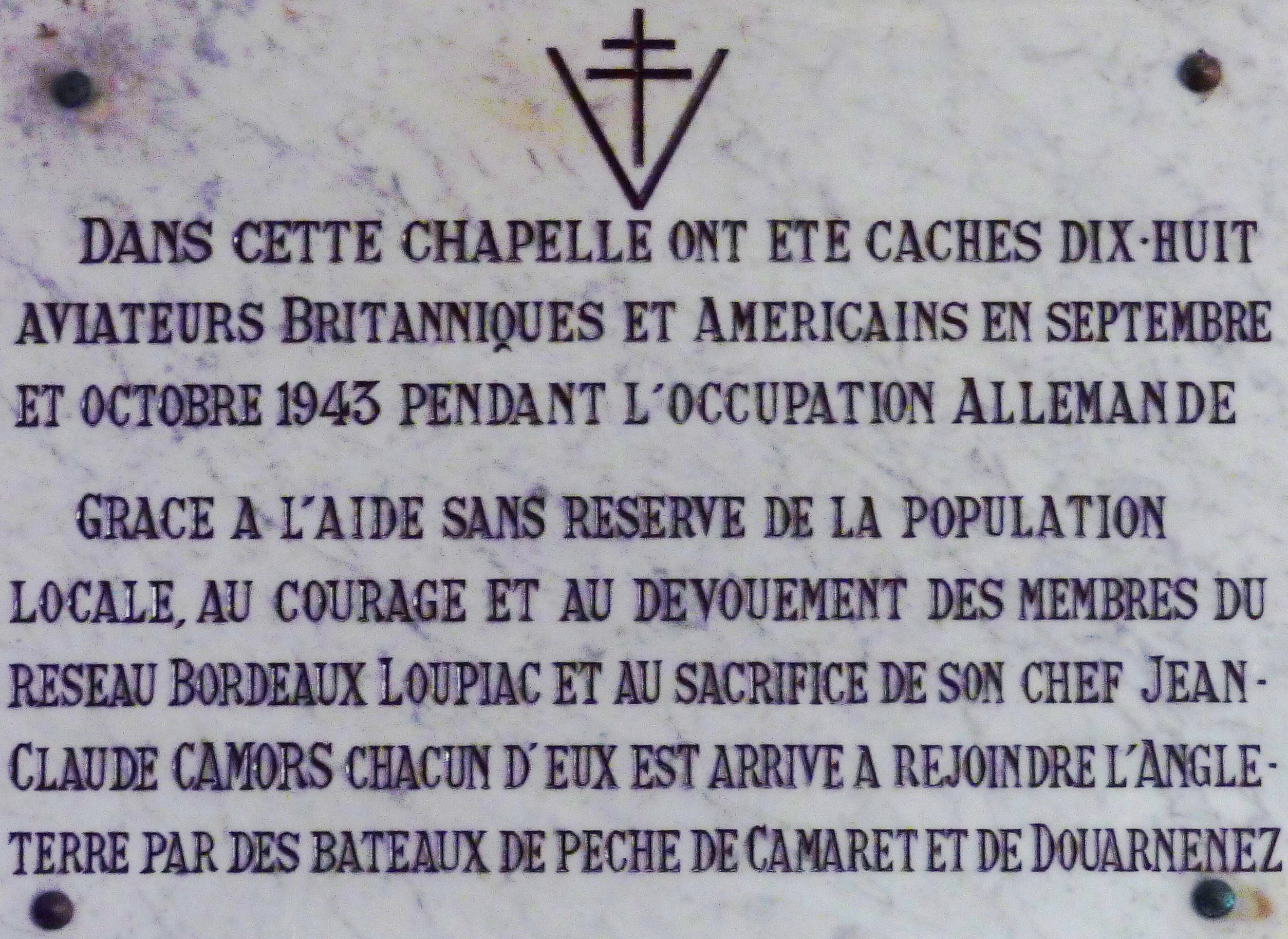
Plaque commemorating the Resistance

== Politics ==
=== Mayors ===
List of successive mayors
Term	Name
2001–2020	Claude Bellin
2020–incumbent	Joël Blaize

=== Municipal election results ===
2020:

- Plomodiern ensemble 58.66%
- Un nouveau souffle pour plomodiern 41.34%.

== See also ==
- Communes of the Finistère department
- Plomodiern Parish close
