= Plomodiern Parish close =

Coordinates: 48.2028°N 4.2348°W

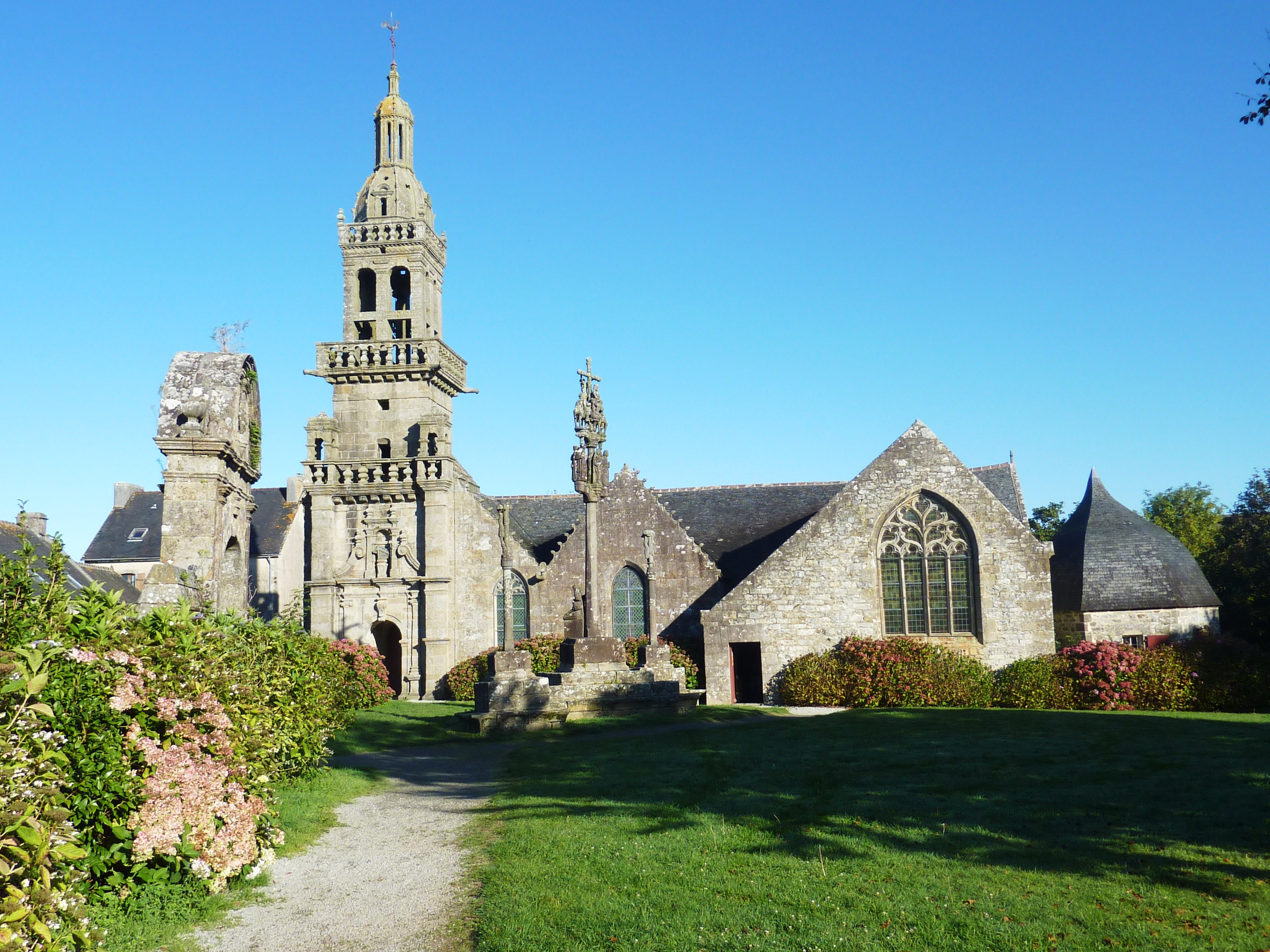
View of chapel

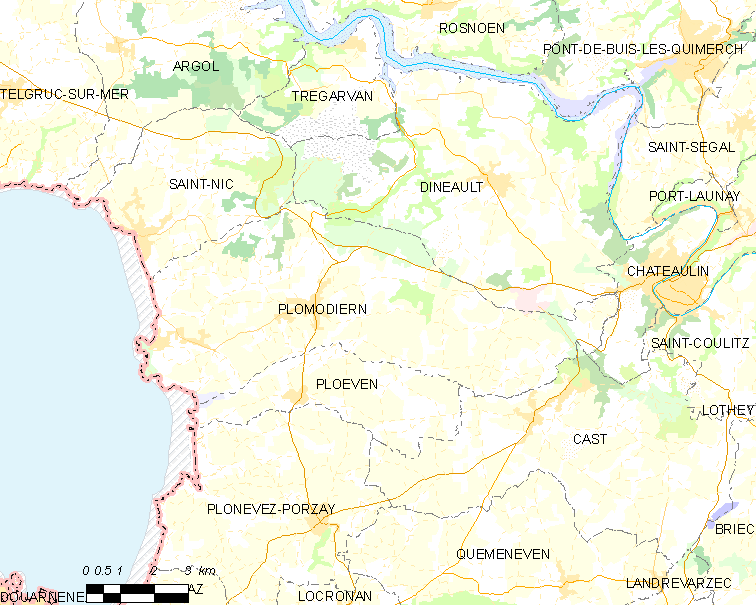
Map showing the location of Plomodiern

The Plomodiern Parish close (Enclos paroissial) is located near the village Plomodiern in the arrondissement of Châteaulin, Brittany, north-western France. It is a listed historical monument since 1914.

== Description ==
The chapel of Sainte Marie du Ménez-Hom at Plomodiern dates to the 16th century and stands in an enclos paroissial accessed through an 18th-century triumphal arch. This dates to 1739 and bears a statue of the blind Saint Hervé with his guide Guic'haran. The enclos has a calvary comprising three crosses inscribed "Jehan Le Faloder Fabricque Feist Iceste Croix Faire MVCXLIIII". The bell tower porch is elaborate and was built in various stages between 1668 and 1773. It has a lanterned dome imitating that in Rome. The chapel's frontage gives onto the enclos' grass patch (placître) and the building itself has used granite from the Logonna quarries for the southern section, a tougher granite from another area for the middle section and grey granite from Armorica for the surrounds to the doors and windows for the section built from 1570 to 1591.

== The baroque altarpieces ==
Inside the chapel are three baroque altarpieces, that belonging to the master altar and those in the altars placed in the south and north of the chapel. . All three are dated to between 1703 and 1710 and have been listed as historic monuments since 24 December 1912. The master altar includes depictions of the Virgin Mary and the Holy Family (Sainte Famille) with Saint Joachim, Saint Joseph and Saint Anne. It was the work of Jean Le Séven and Jean Cévaër. The altarpiece in the south of the church celebrates Saint Peter, Saint James, Saint Andrew and Saint Paul whilst that in the north of the church depicts John the Baptist, Saint Louis, Saint Lawrence and Mary Magdalene.

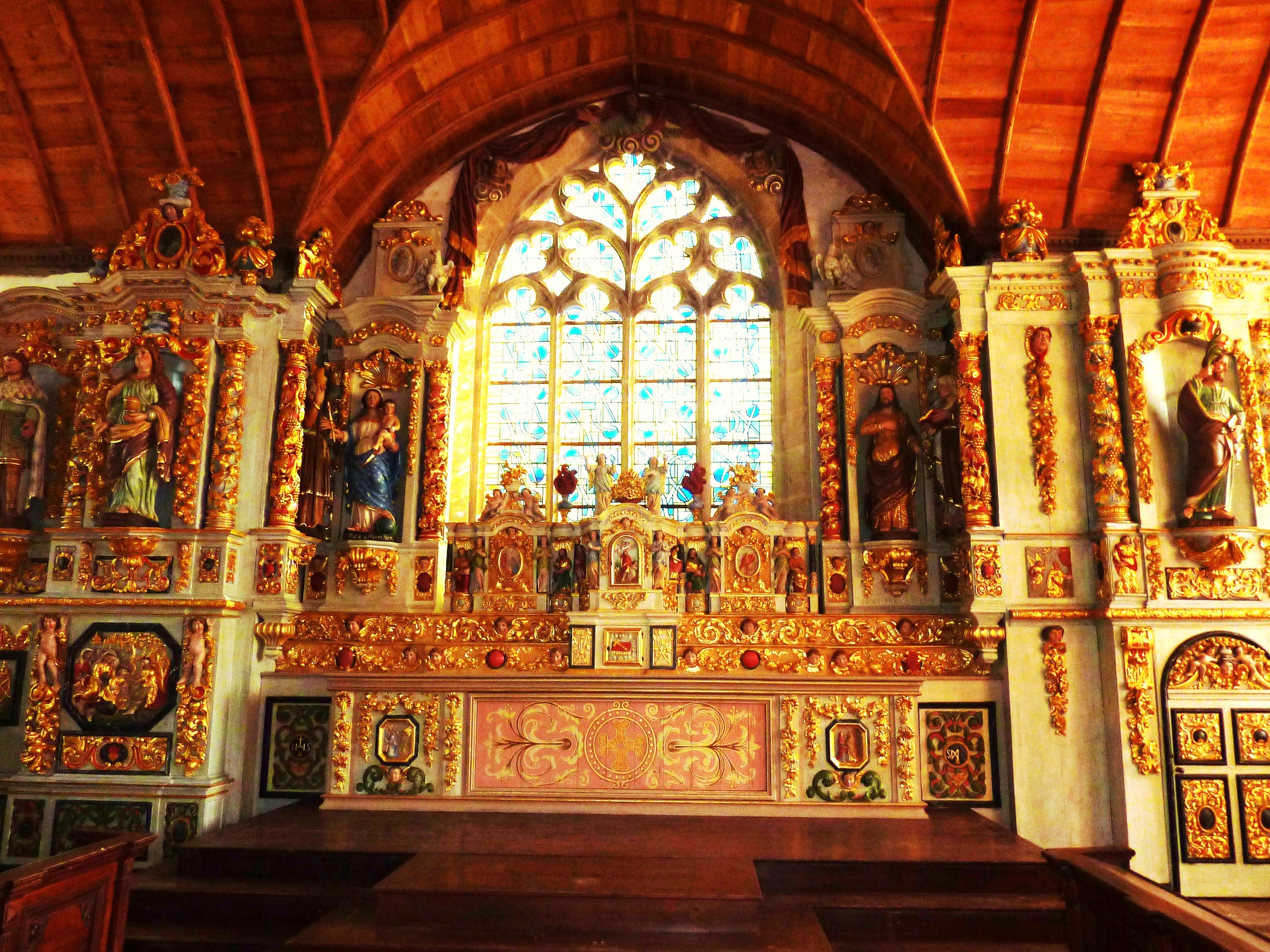
The sumptuous altarpiece of the main altar in the Sainte-Marie du Ménez-Hom chapel

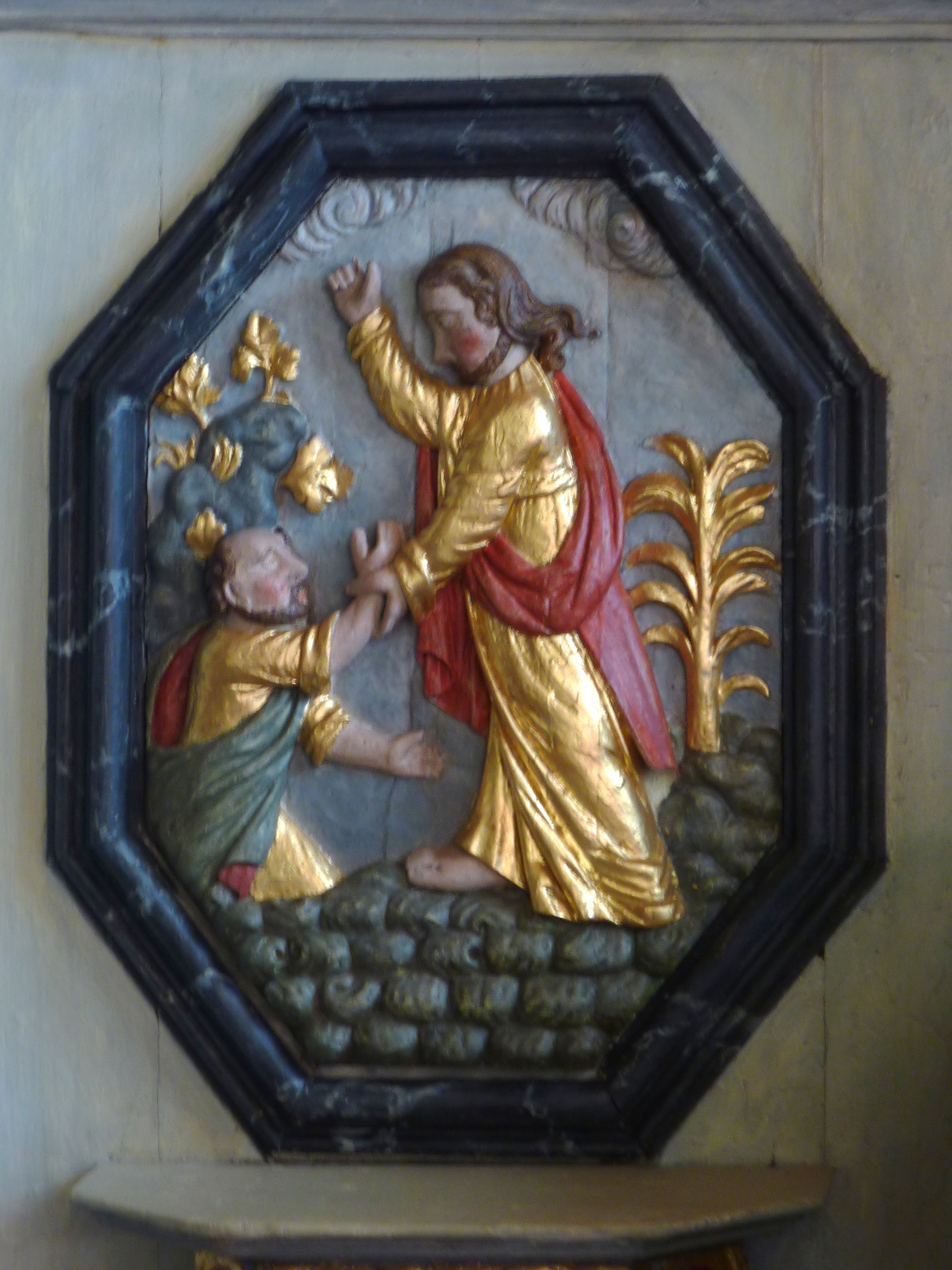
Part of the altarpiece in the north of the chapel. Saint Peter tries to assist Jesus as he walks on water.

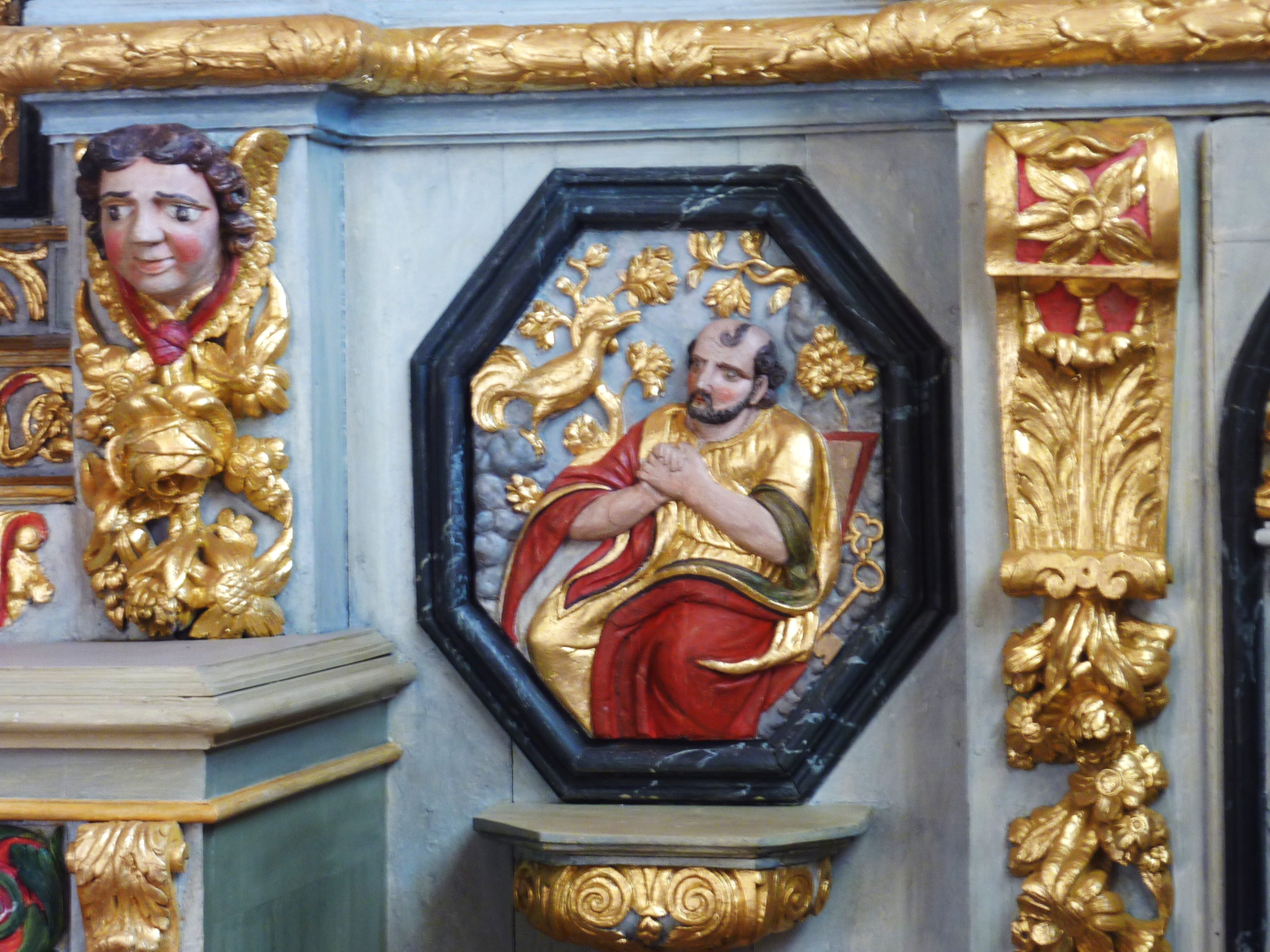
Part of the altarpiece in the south of the chapel: Saint Peter denies Jesus

== The Calvary ==
The 7.50 metre high calvary dates to 1544 and comprises three crosses. The larger cross bears the crucified Jesus backed by a depiction of Jesus seated and awaiting the crucifixion process to start. Underneath him are two men on horseback and on a lower crosspiece a statue of Saint Peter is placed back to back with John the Evangelist and Mary Magdalene back to back with Saint Yves, these placed on either side of a Roland Doré "Vierge de Pitié" backed by a depiction of the Virgin Mary with child. At the base of the cross, Mary Magdalene appears again, this time on her knees and looking up to Jesus on the cross. The good and bad robbers occupy the two other crosses.

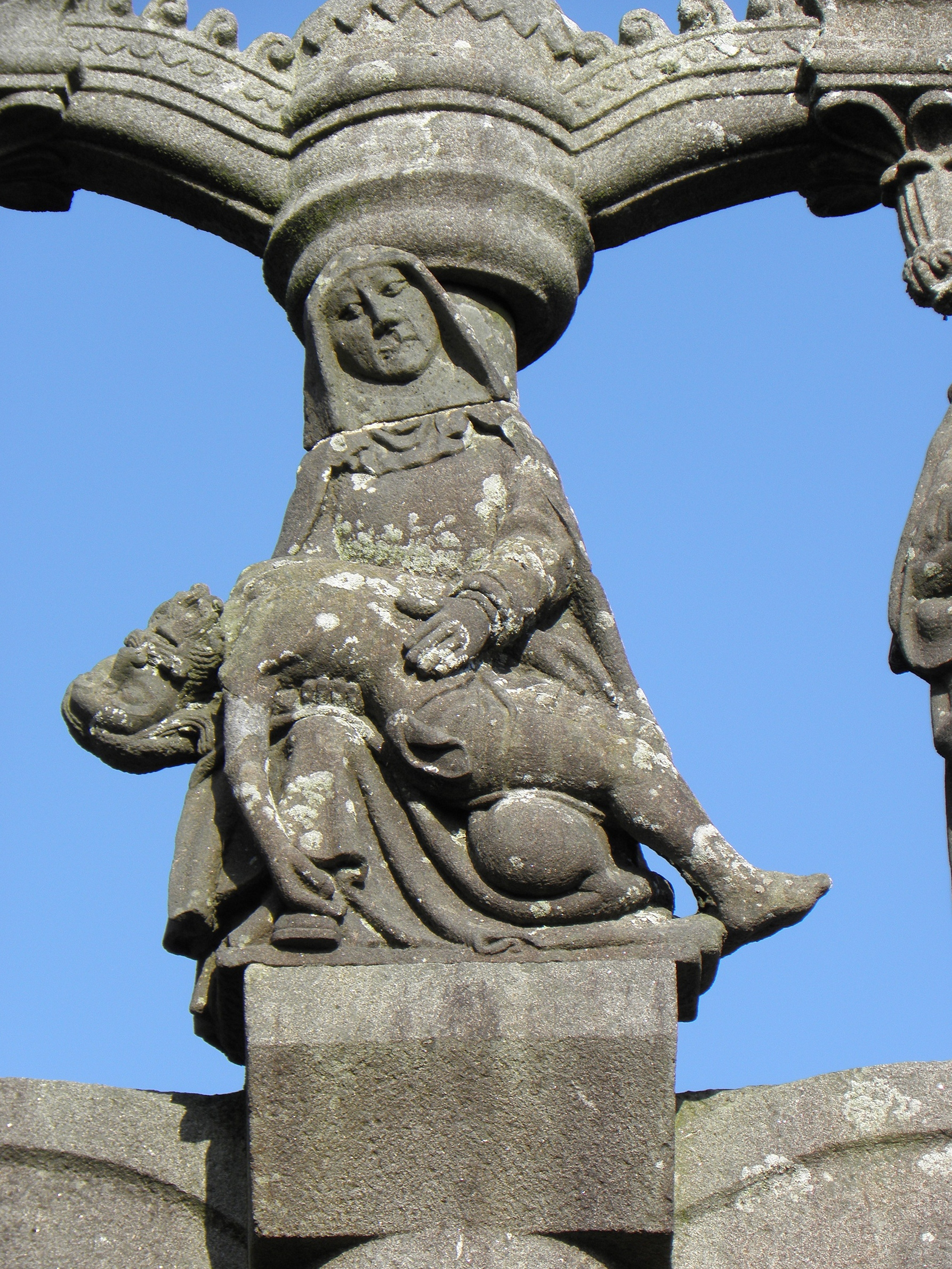
Pietà on the Sainte-Marie du Ménez-Hom Calvary

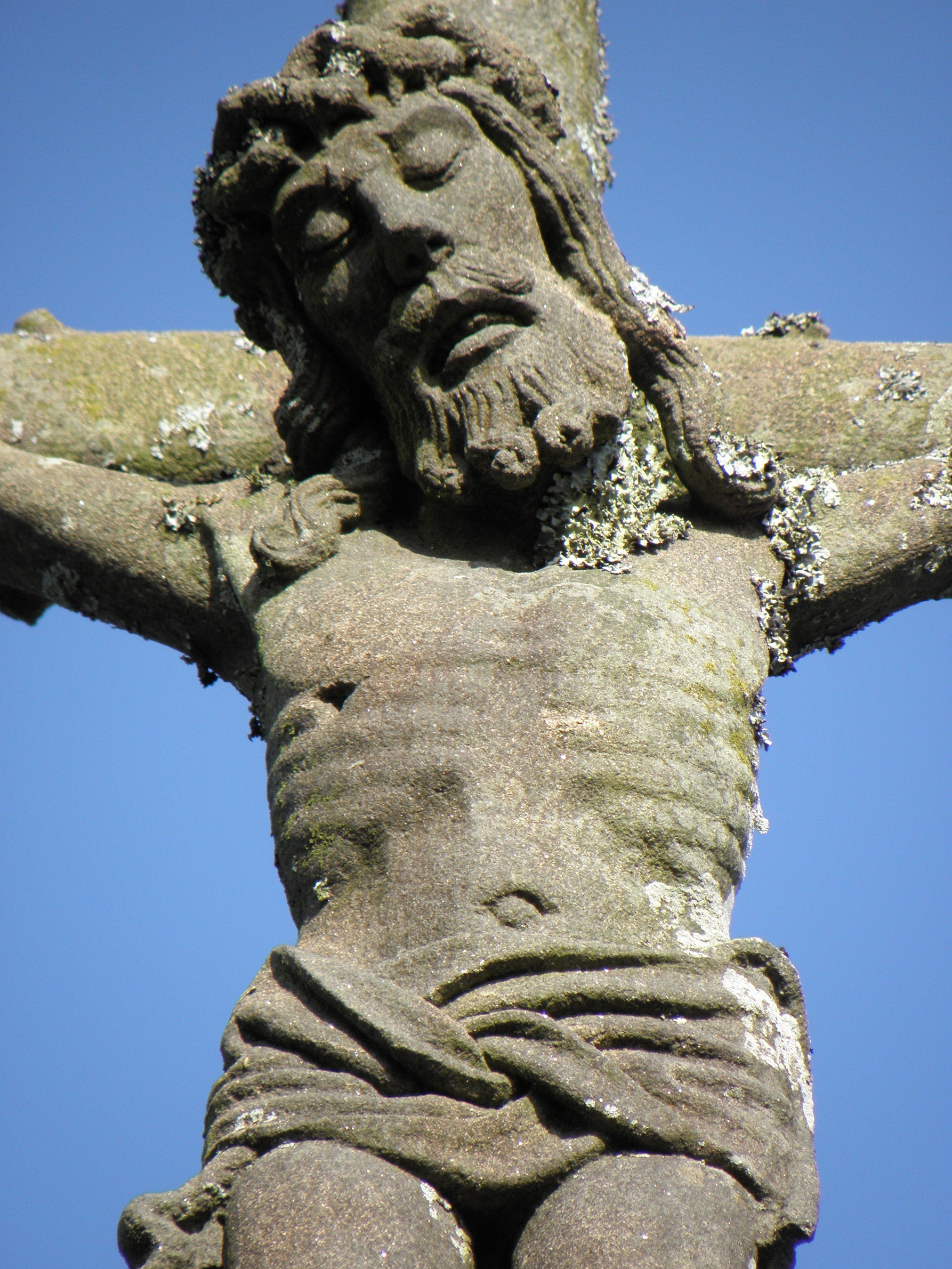
The depiction of Christ on the Sainte-Marie du Ménez-Hom Calvary

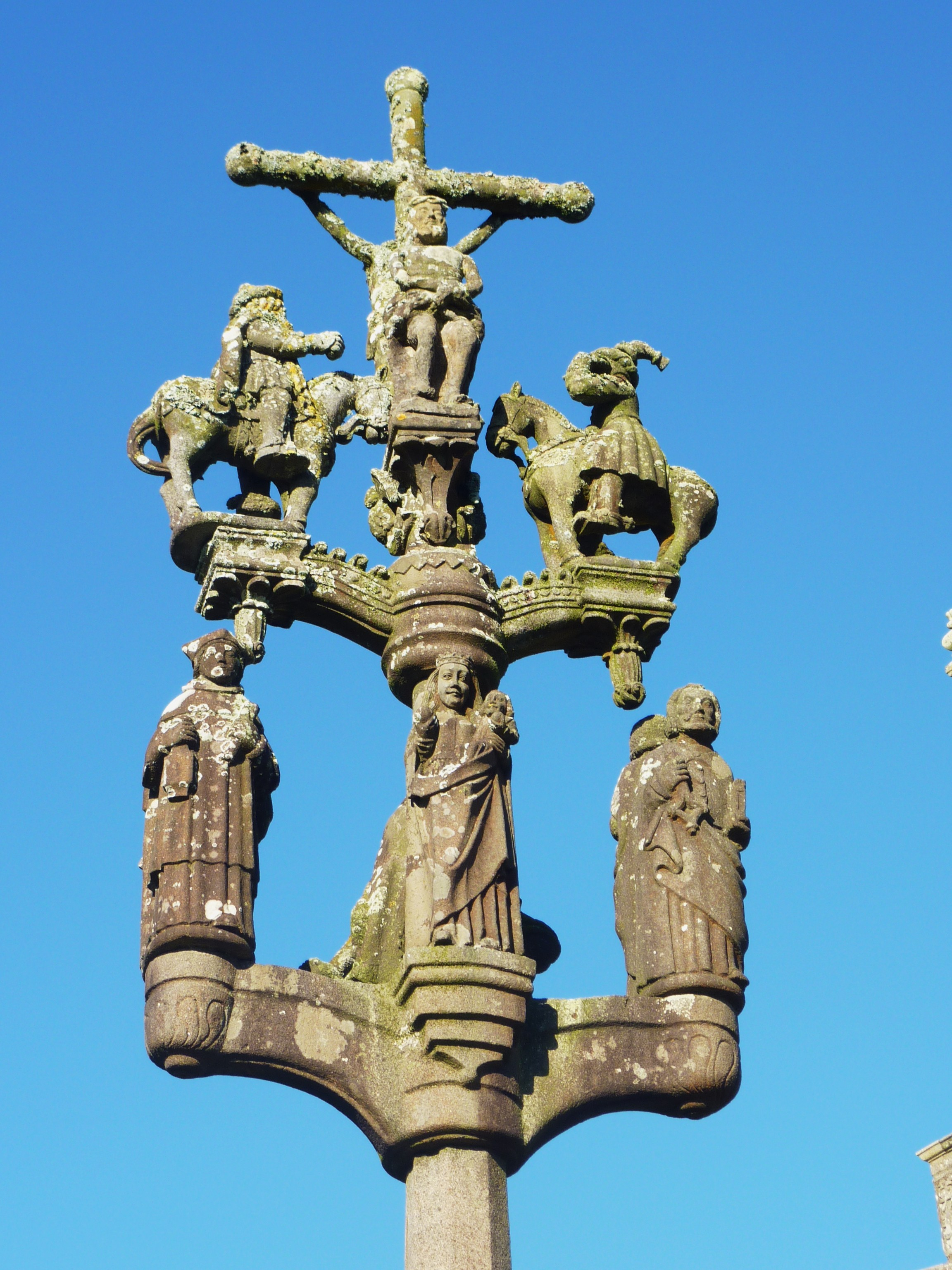
The calvary at Sainte-Marie du Ménez-Hom

== Other furnishings ==
- There is a carving in wood depicting Jesus on the cross. This dates to the 18th-century and has been listed as an historic monument since 17 September 1957.
- There is a 15th-century statue in the nave depicting Saint Lawrence with the grill with which he was martyred.
- The church has several remarkable sablières (a decorated horizontal beam normally running along the top of a wall where it meets the roof).
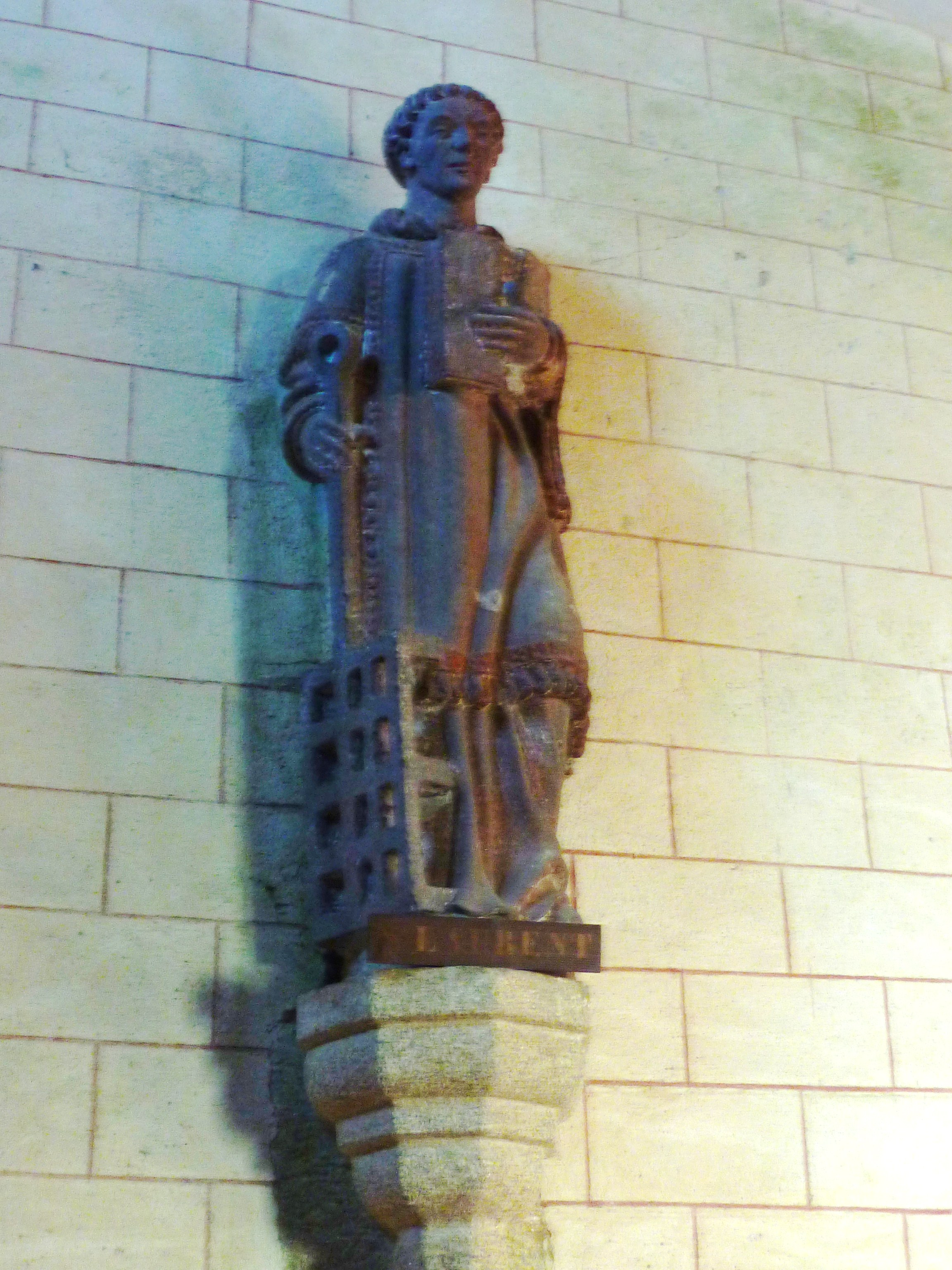
Statue of Saint Lawrence with the grill by his side

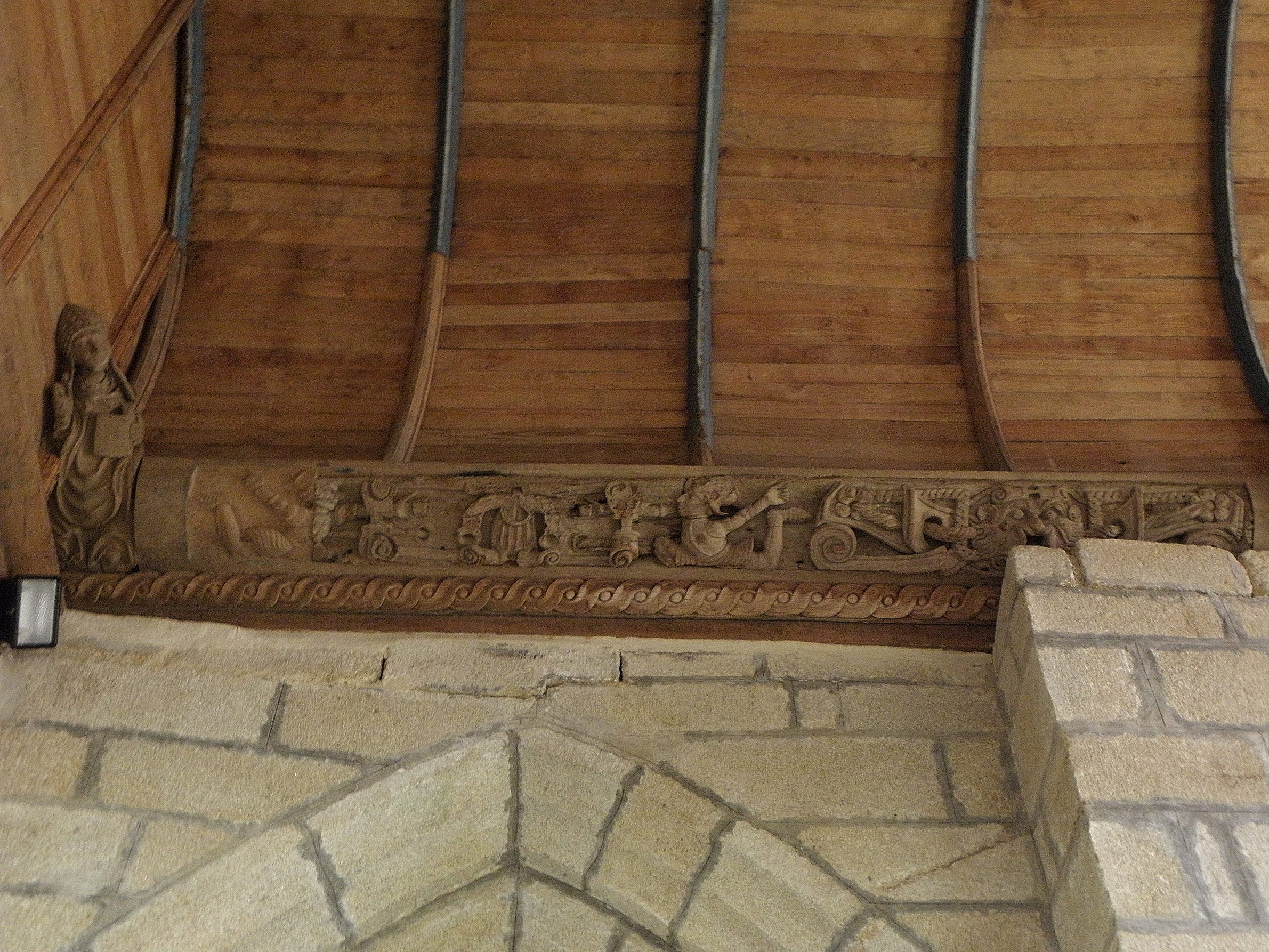
A sablière at the Chapelle Sainte-Marie-du-Ménez-Hom
