= Guimiliau Parish close =

Parish close located in Finistère, in France

Coordinates: 48.4884°N 3.9977°W

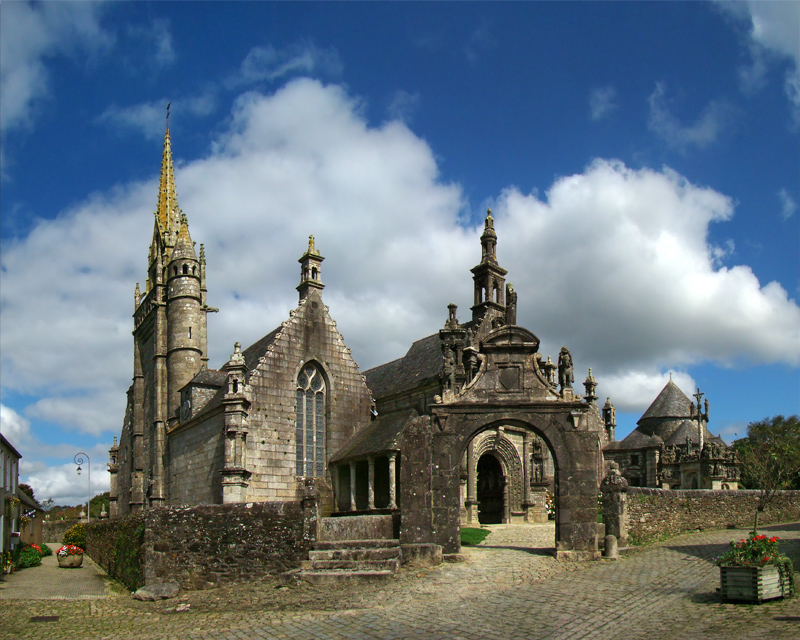
The parish church of Saint Miliau

The Guimiliau Parish close (Enclos paroissial) is located at Guimiliau in the arrondissement of Morlaix in Brittany in north-western France. The parish takes its name from Saint Miliau who was beheaded in 792 on his brother's orders. He is a saint called upon by those suffering from ulcers and rheumatism.

The parish close dates from the 16th and 17th-century and comprises an "arc de triomphe" style entrance, an ossuary, a bell-tower, an elaborate porch, a funeral chapel, a cemetery and a church with a baptistery, a pulpit, altarpieces, a sacristy, an organ, and the unusual Calvary at Guimiliau. It is a listed historical monument since 1906.

The main features of the close are:

== The "Arc de Triomphe" style entrance ==
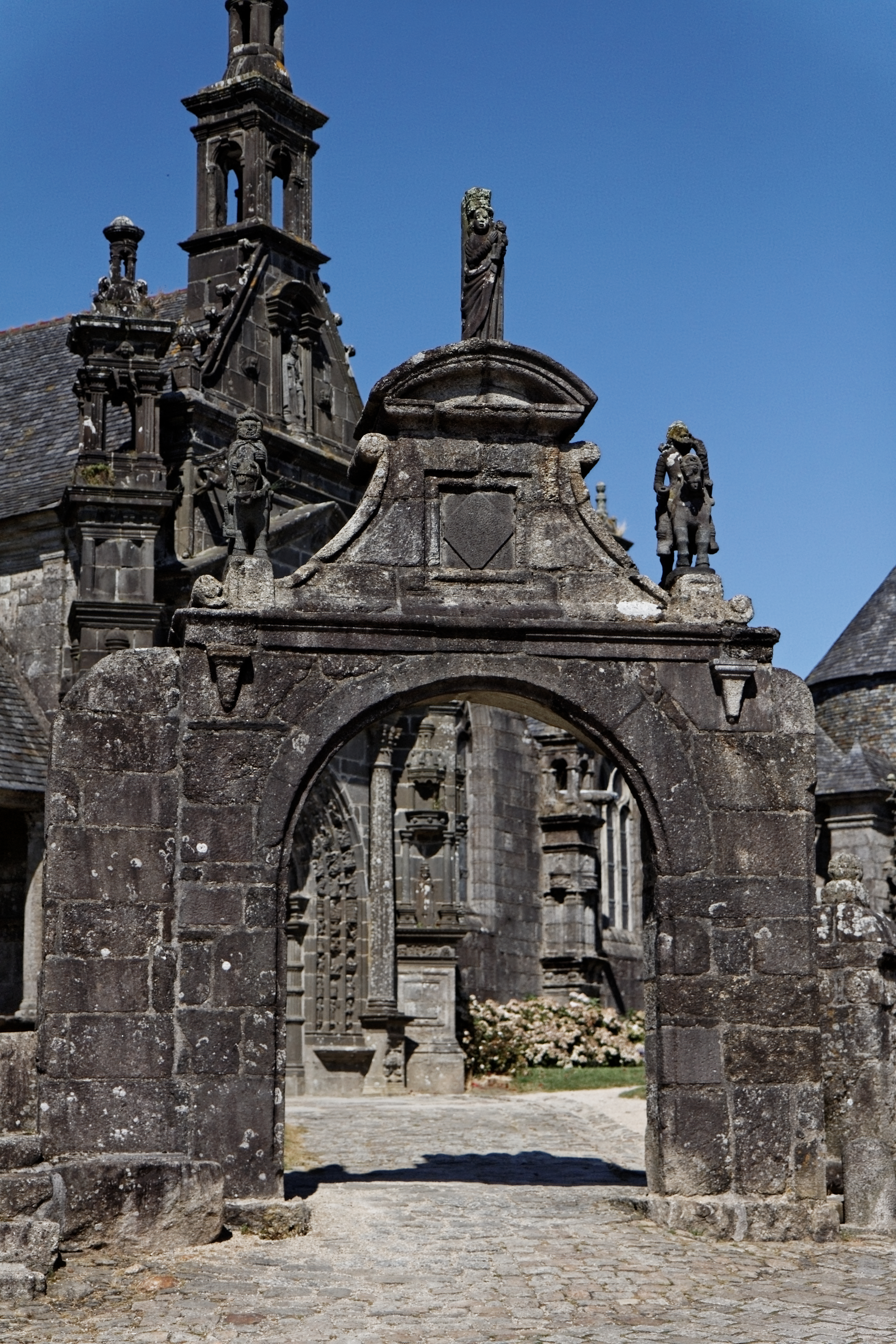
The entrance to the Guimiliau enclos paroissial. Note the two men on horse-back and the statue of the Virgin Mary with child at the very top

This is surmounted with statues of two cavaliers and the Virgin Mary with child.

== The Calvary ==
The calvary, completed in 1588, includes statues showing 37 scenes and comprises a single cross above an octagonal base.

== Bell-tower ==
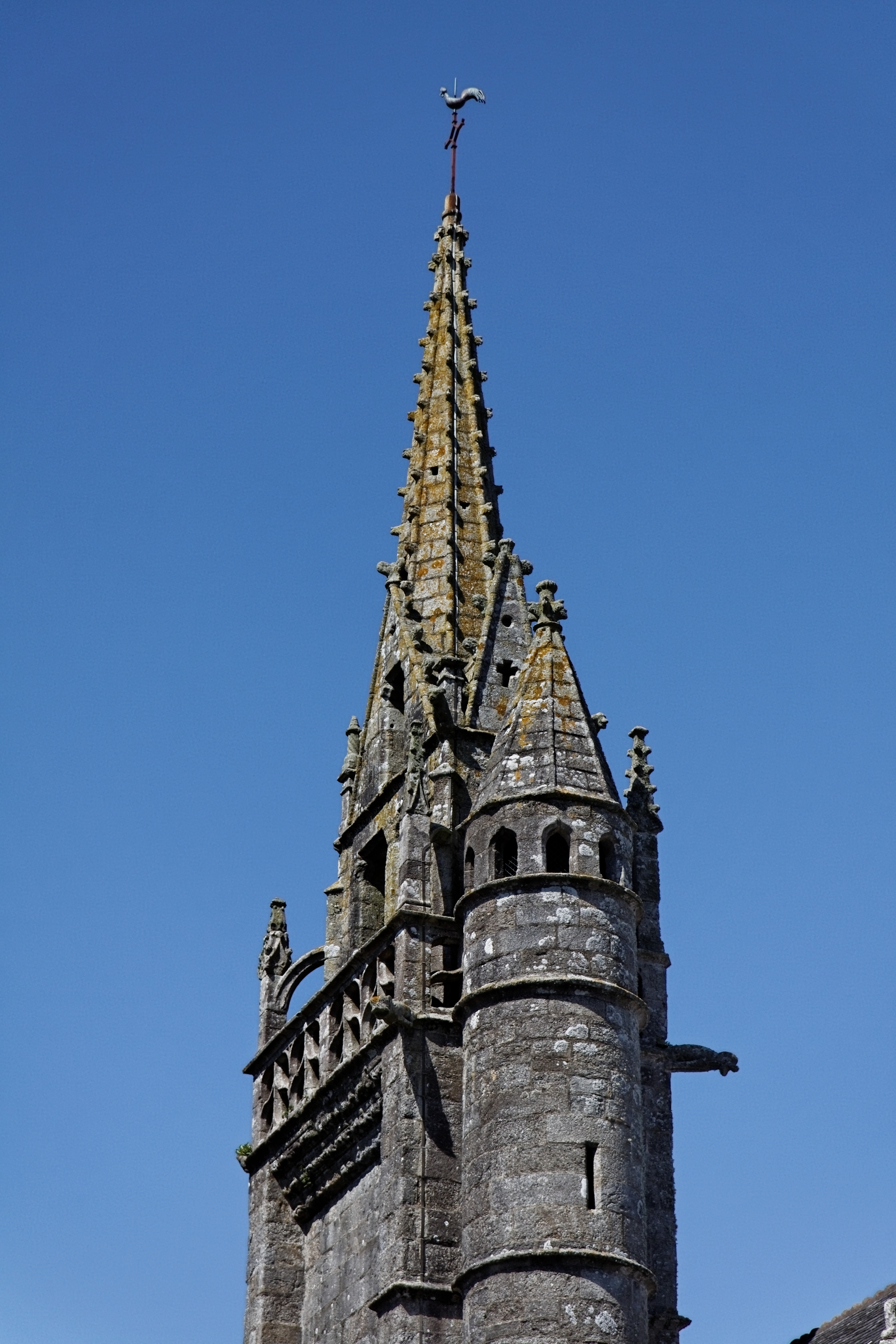
The Guimiliau parish church bell-tower with flanking tower

The bell-tower is in the "Beaumanoir" style and is flanked with a round tower.

== Ossuary ==
Dating to the 17th-century, the building is decorated with stoups and bas-reliefs carved from Kersanton stone. To the left of the church porch there is a columned area which served as the original ossuary. See photograph identified as the "old ossuary". On the old ossuary wall, are some relief carvings.

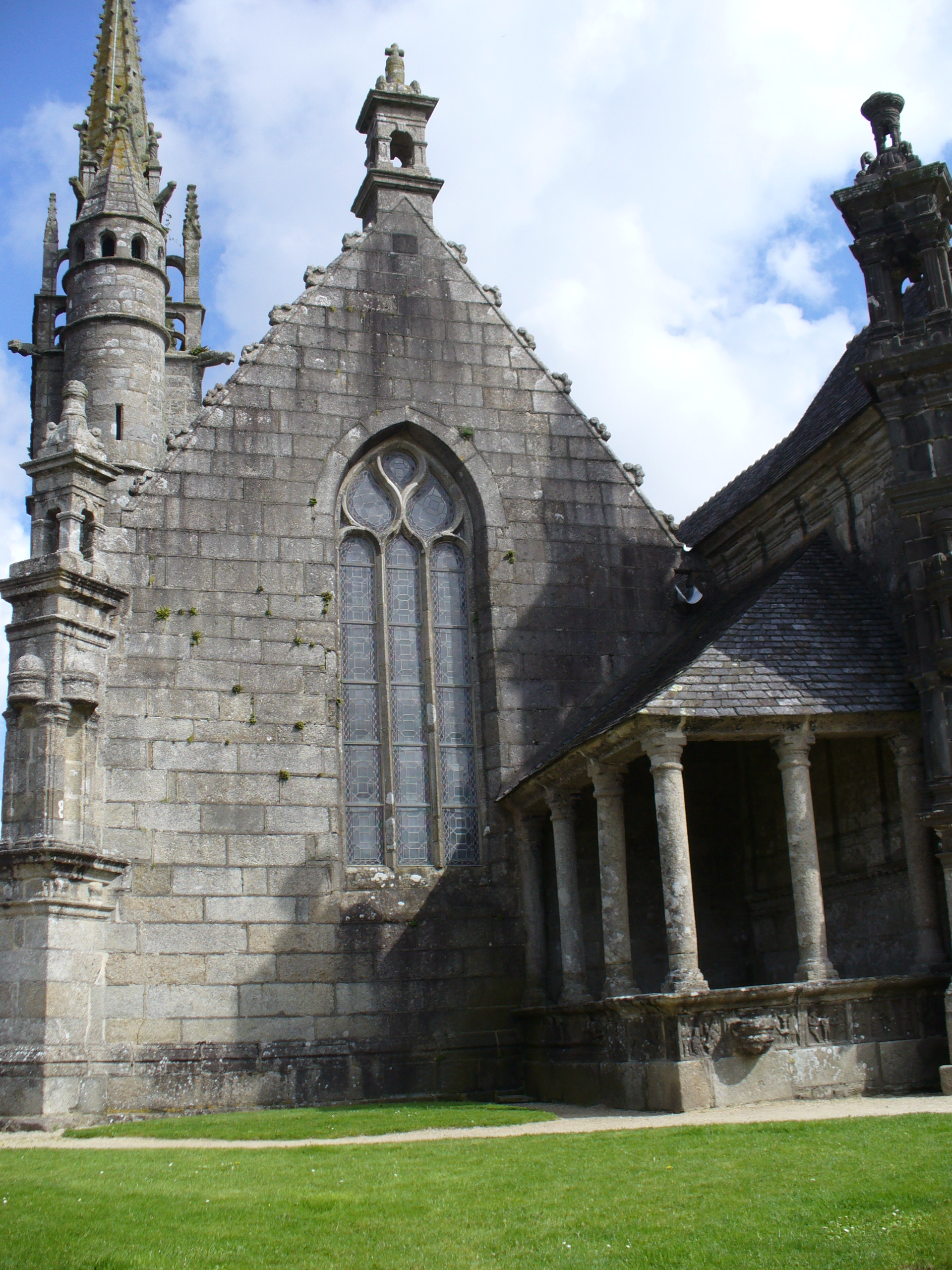
Reliefs on the Old Ossuary wall

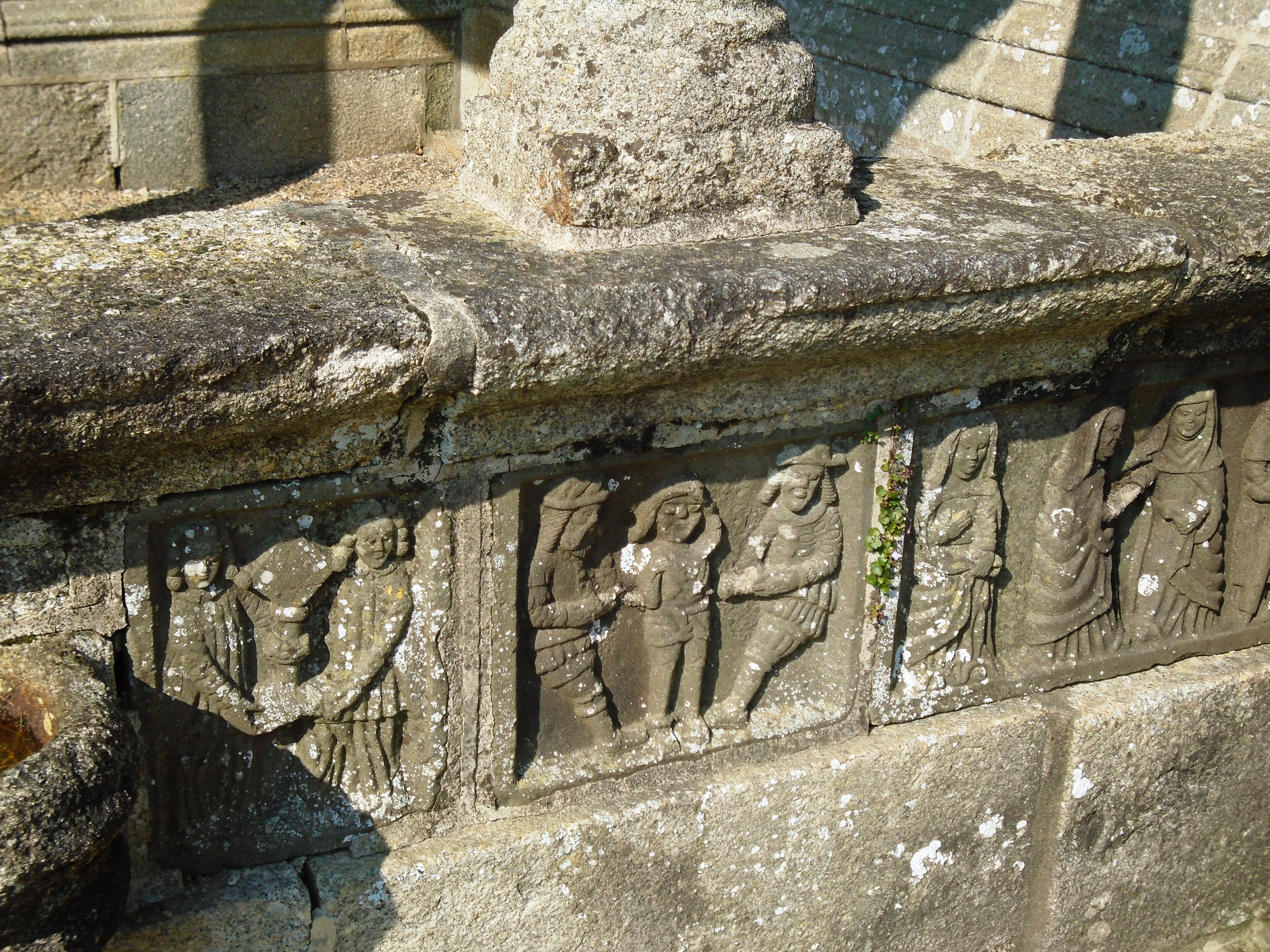
Further reliefs on the Old Ossuary wall

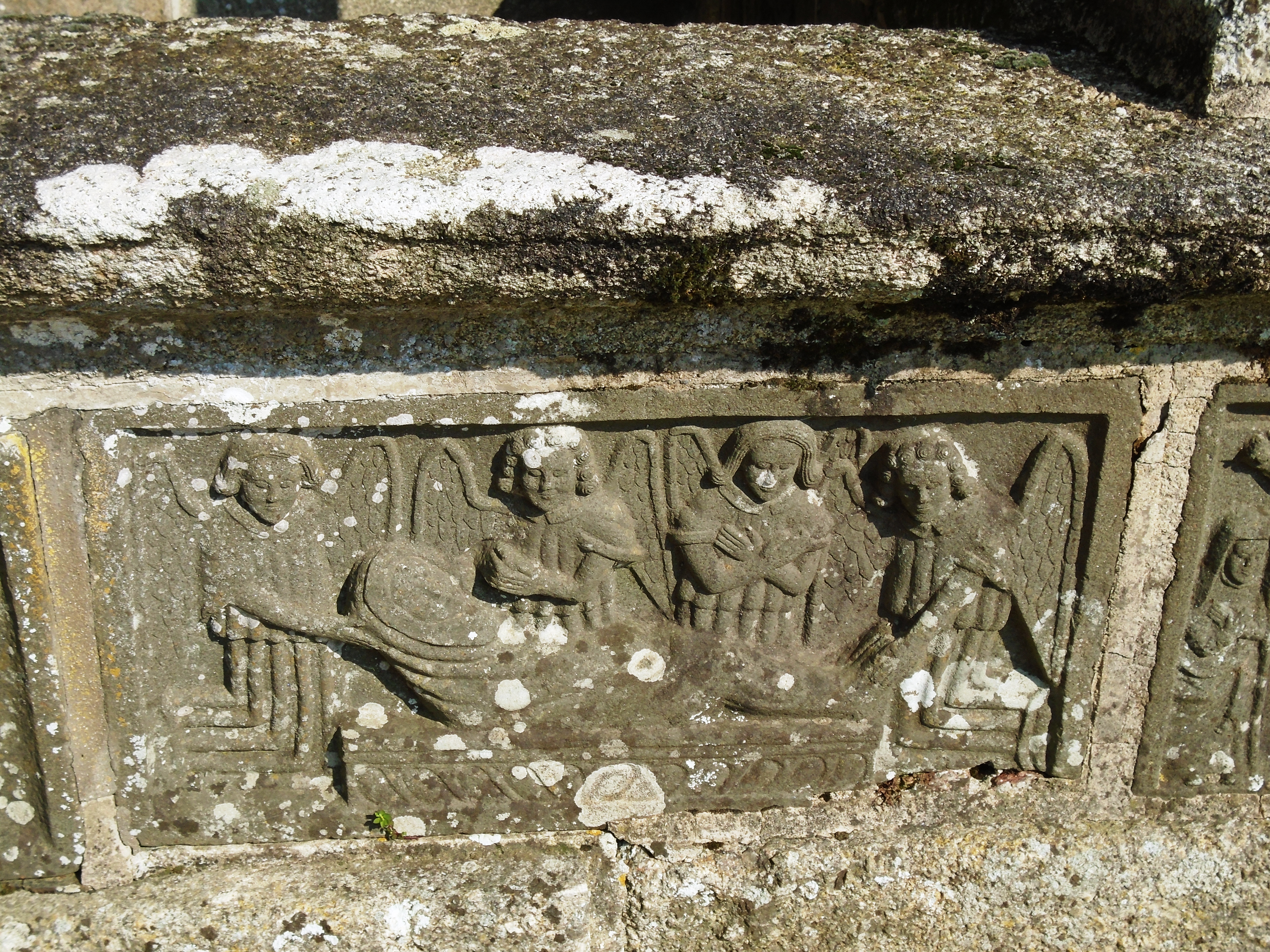
Further reliefs on the Old Ossuary wall

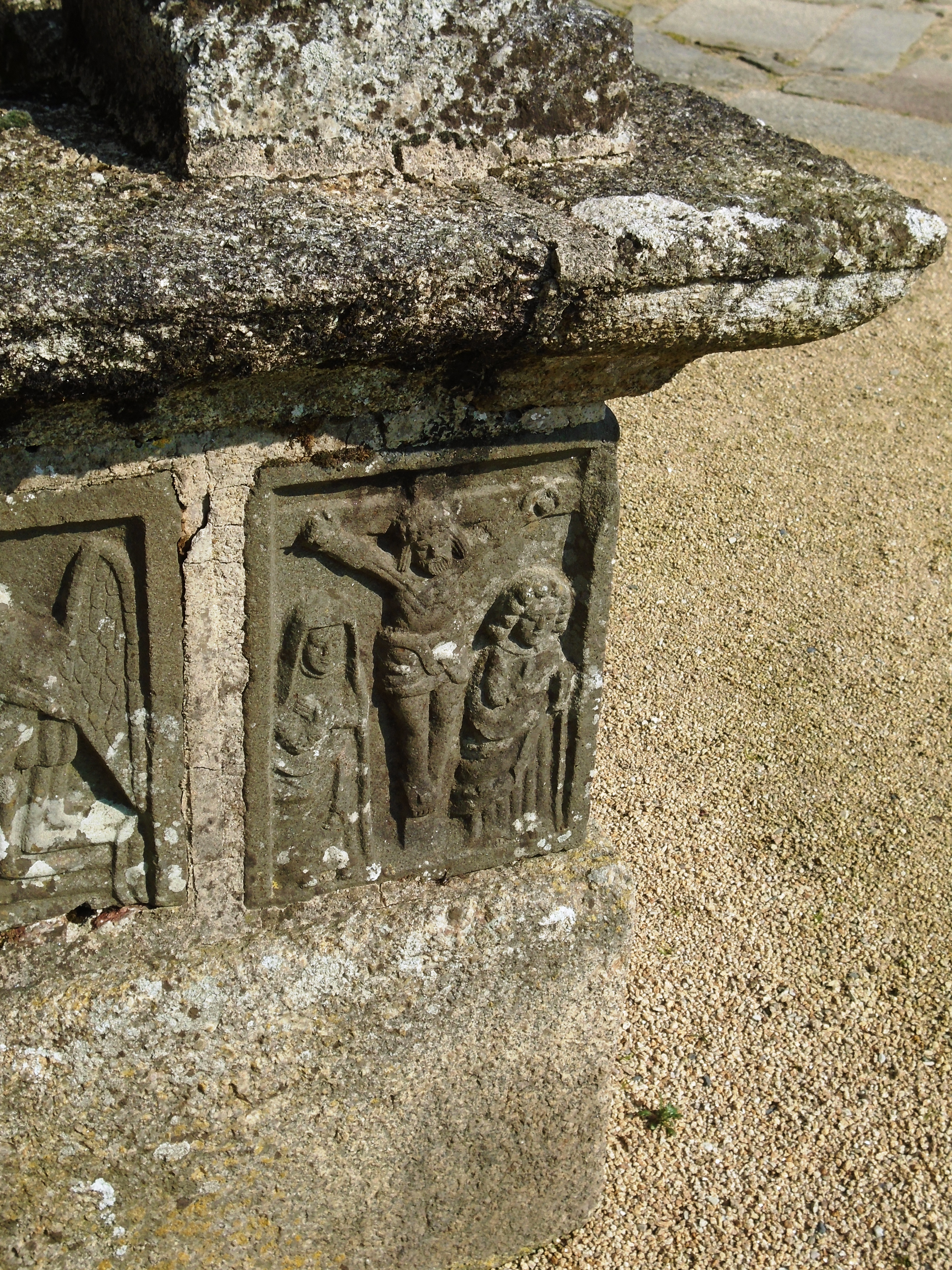
Further reliefs on the Old Ossuary wall

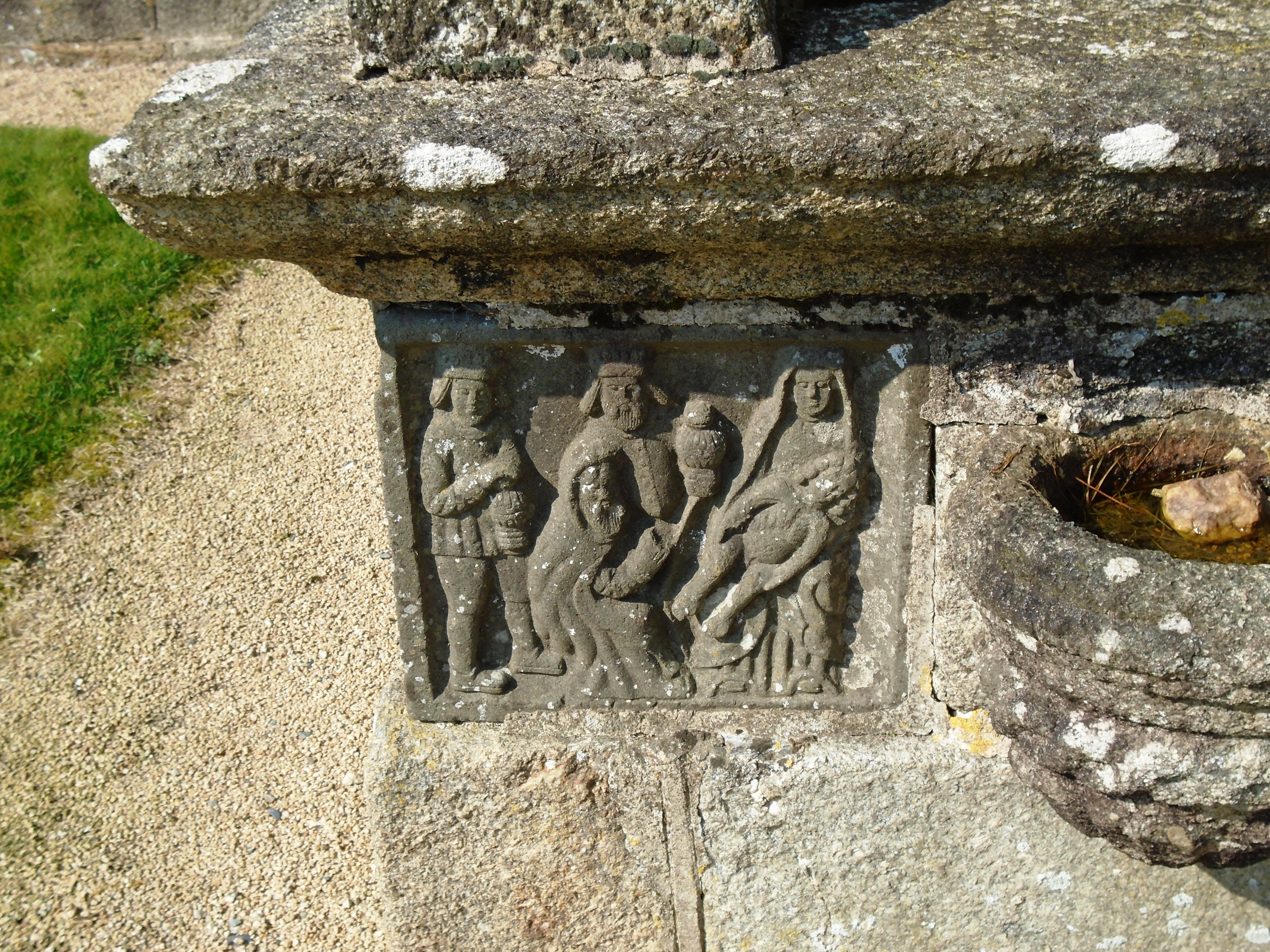
Further reliefs on the Old Ossuary wall

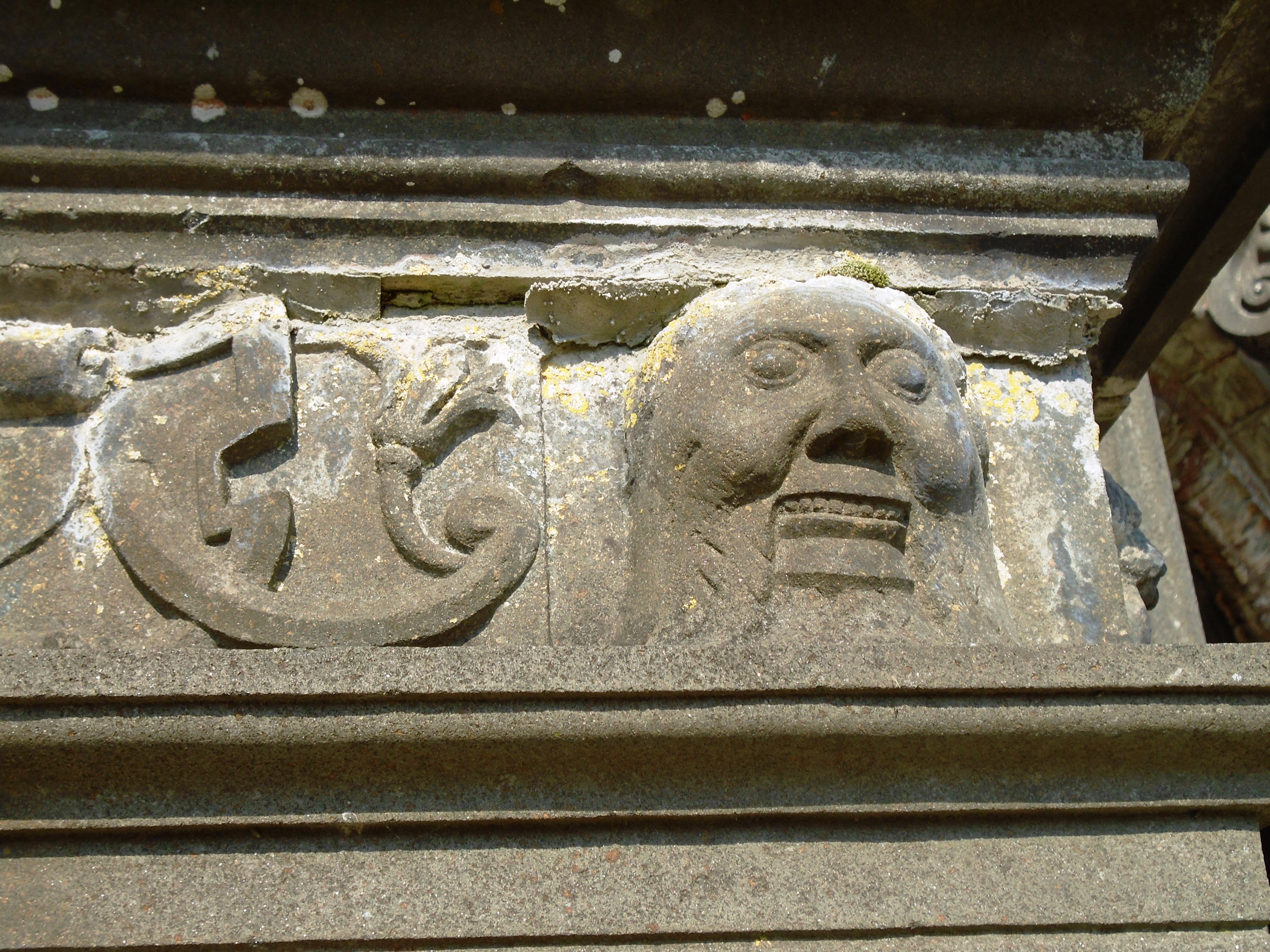
Carvings near ossuary wall

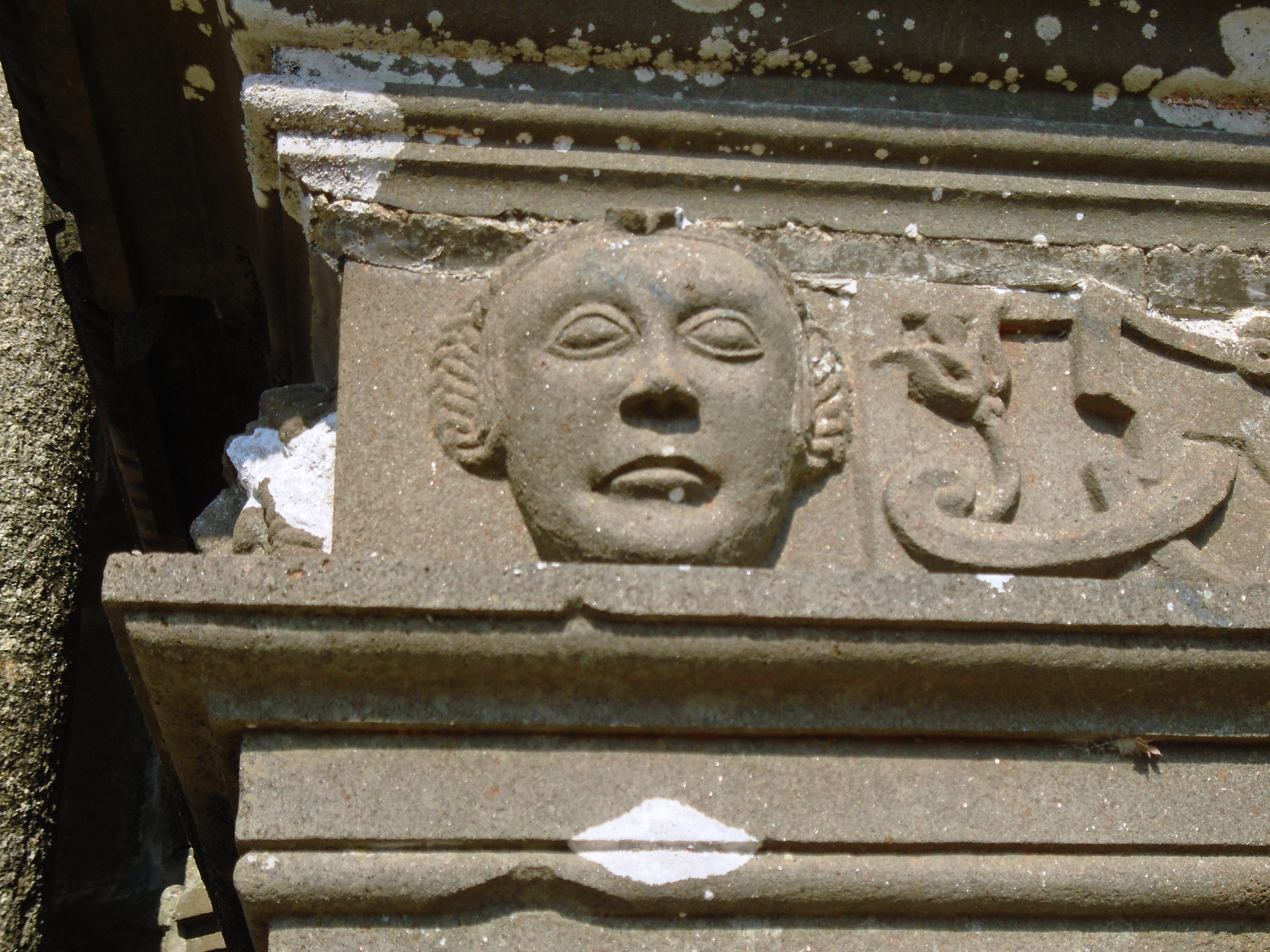
Carvings near ossuary wall

== The church interior ==
The entry to the choir area has pillars with statues of saints Yves and Hervé with his wolf. The balustrade dates to the 17th-century.

The altarpiece of the Rosary dates to the 17th-century and has depictions of the Virgin Mary, saint Dominic and Sainte-Catherine of Sienna whilst various medallions tell the story of the "mysteries" of the Rosary. Twisted columns are decorated with carvings of angels and various animals and the altarpiece also has images in niches of saints Nicholas, Zachary, and the Holy Father. The Saint Miliau altarpiece includes a panel depicting Saint Miliau carrying his severed head.

The Saint Joseph altarpiece includes images of saints Anne and Elizabeth as well as Lawrence with his grill/gridiron and the tree of knowledge. The church has several processional banners and a fine ambon carved as an eagle.

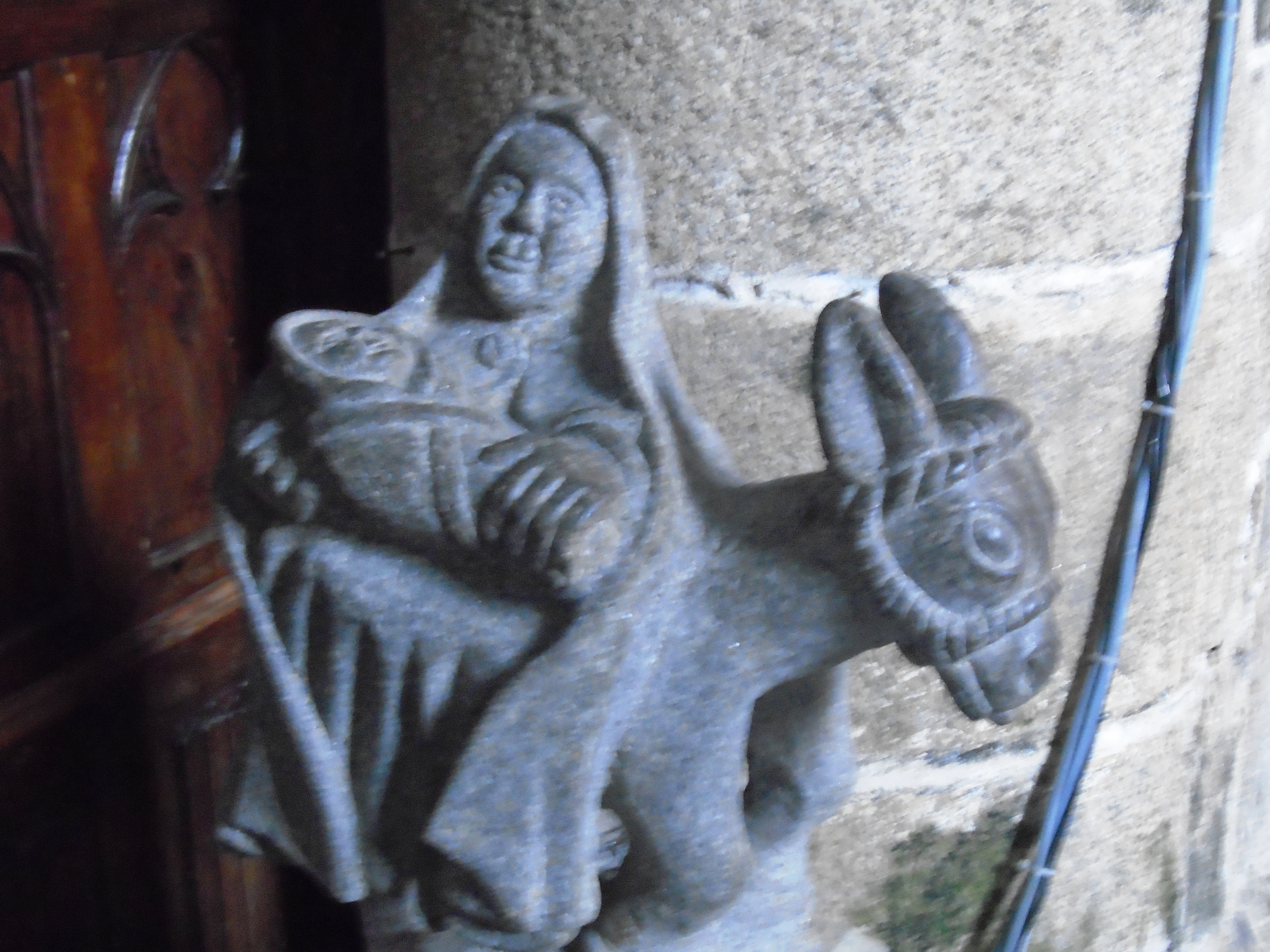
"Fuite en Egypte". Sculpture by Michel Quéré who died in 1993. Donated to the church by his family

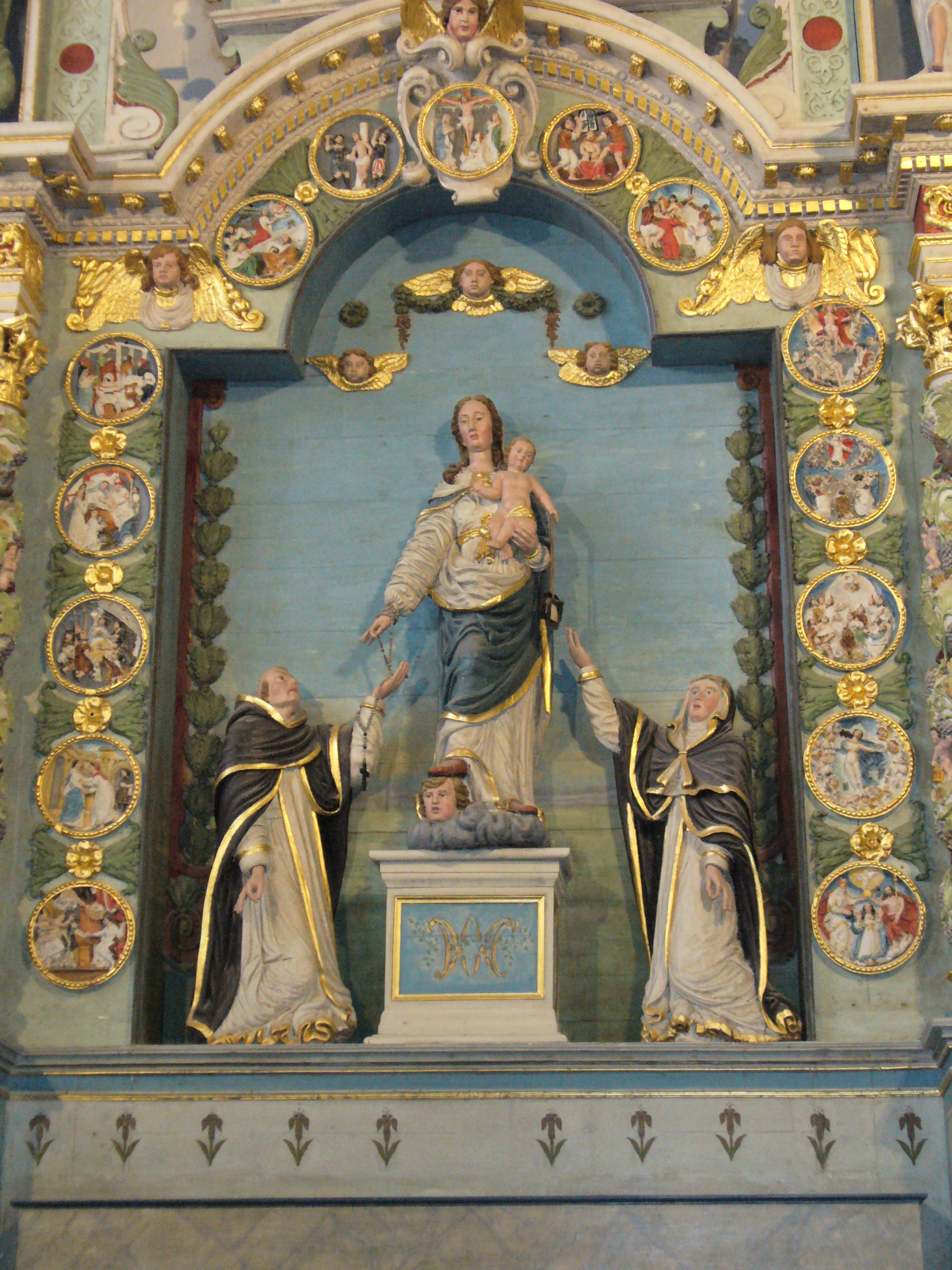
Part of the "Rosary" altarpiece.

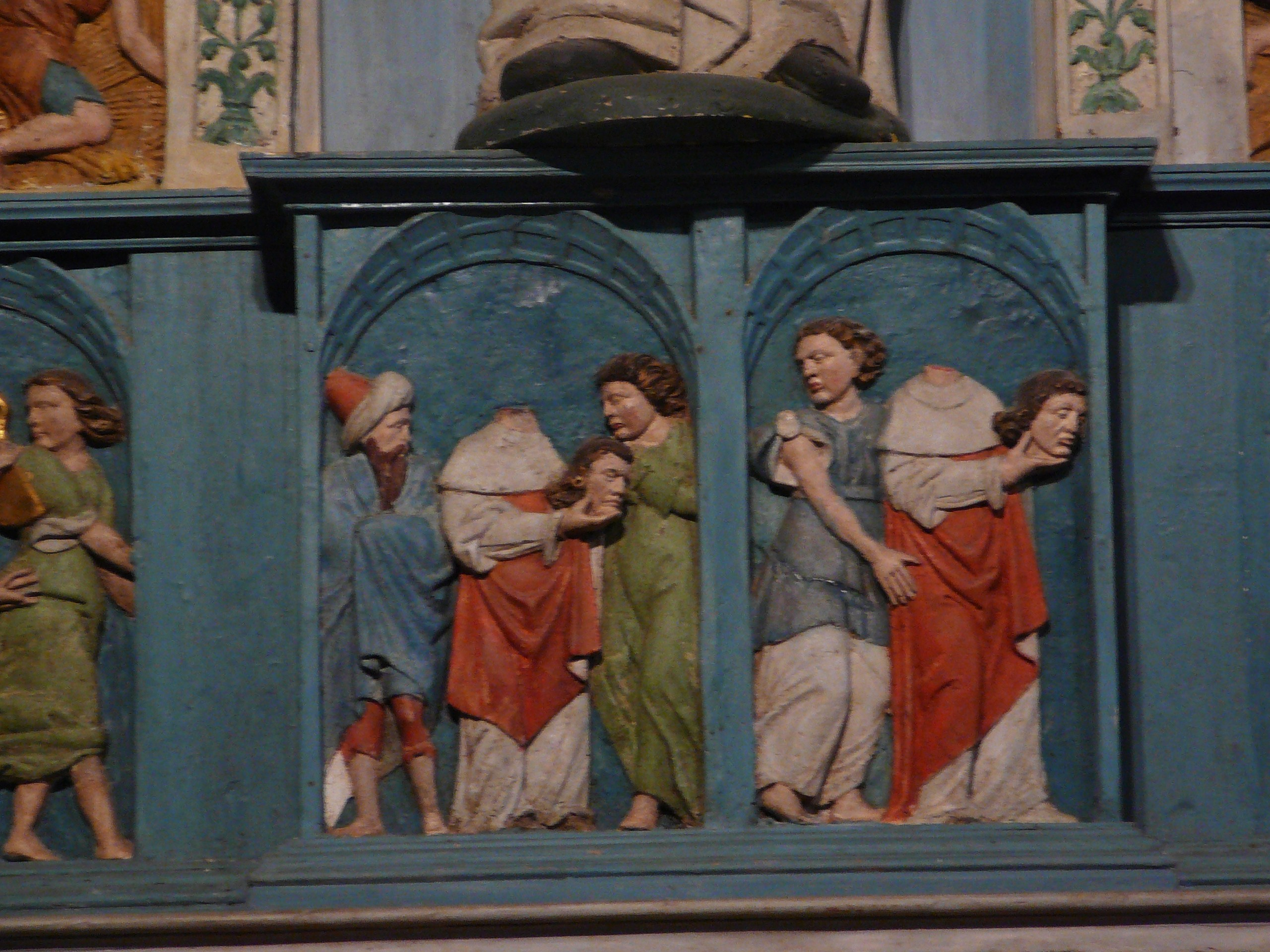
A panel in the saint Miliau altarpiece shows saint Miliau carrying his severed head.

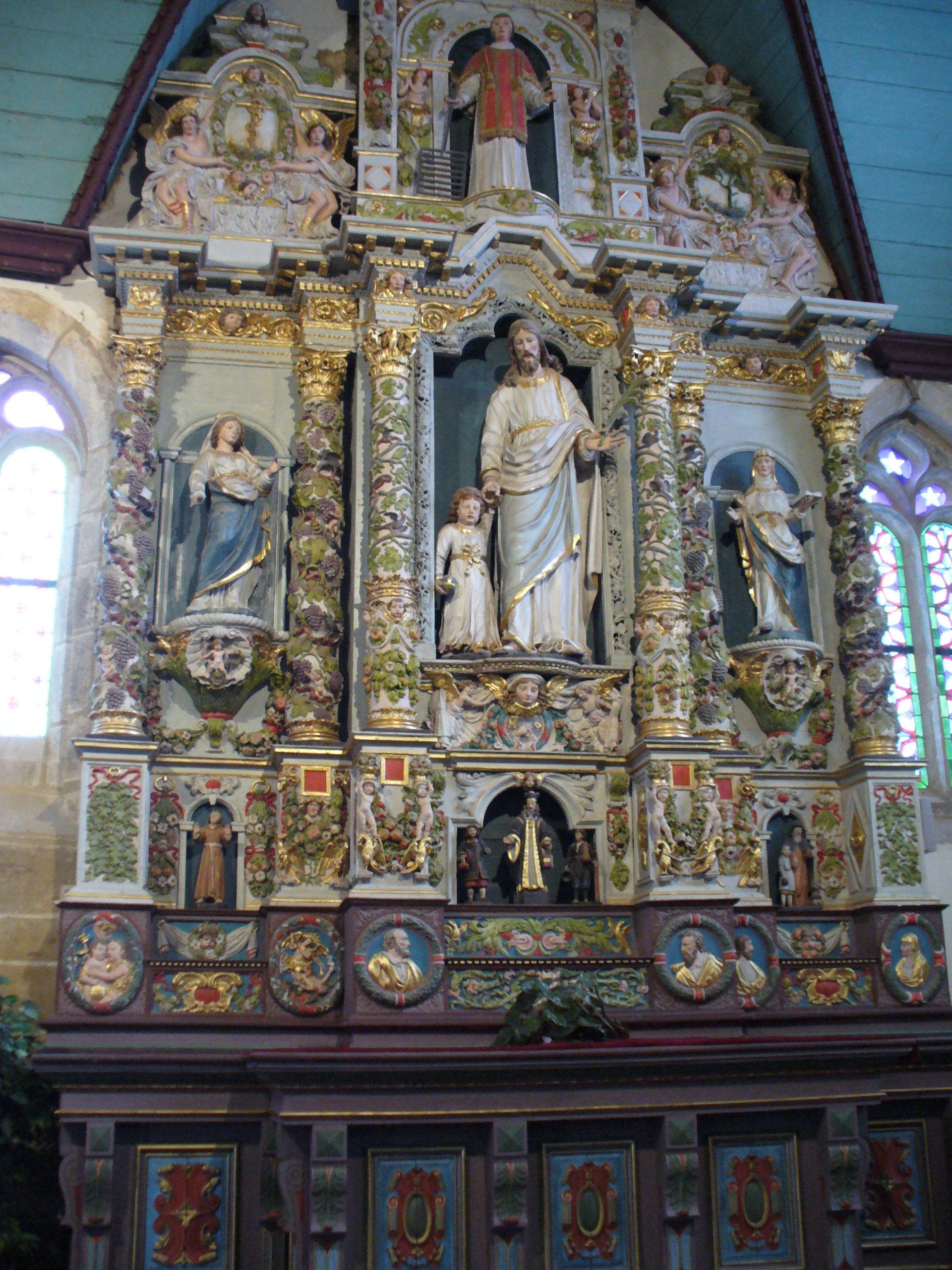
The saint Joseph altarpiece

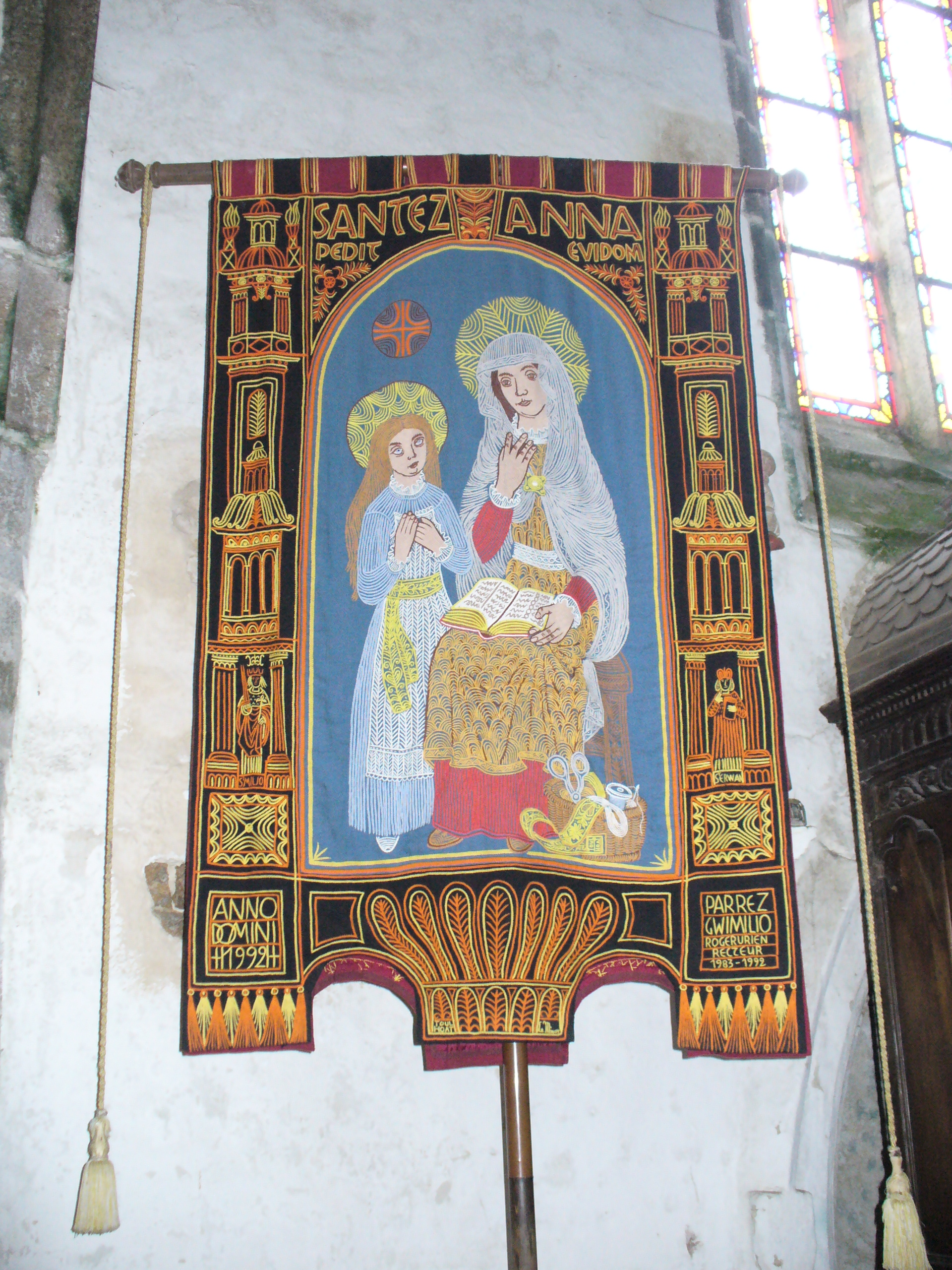
A processional banner

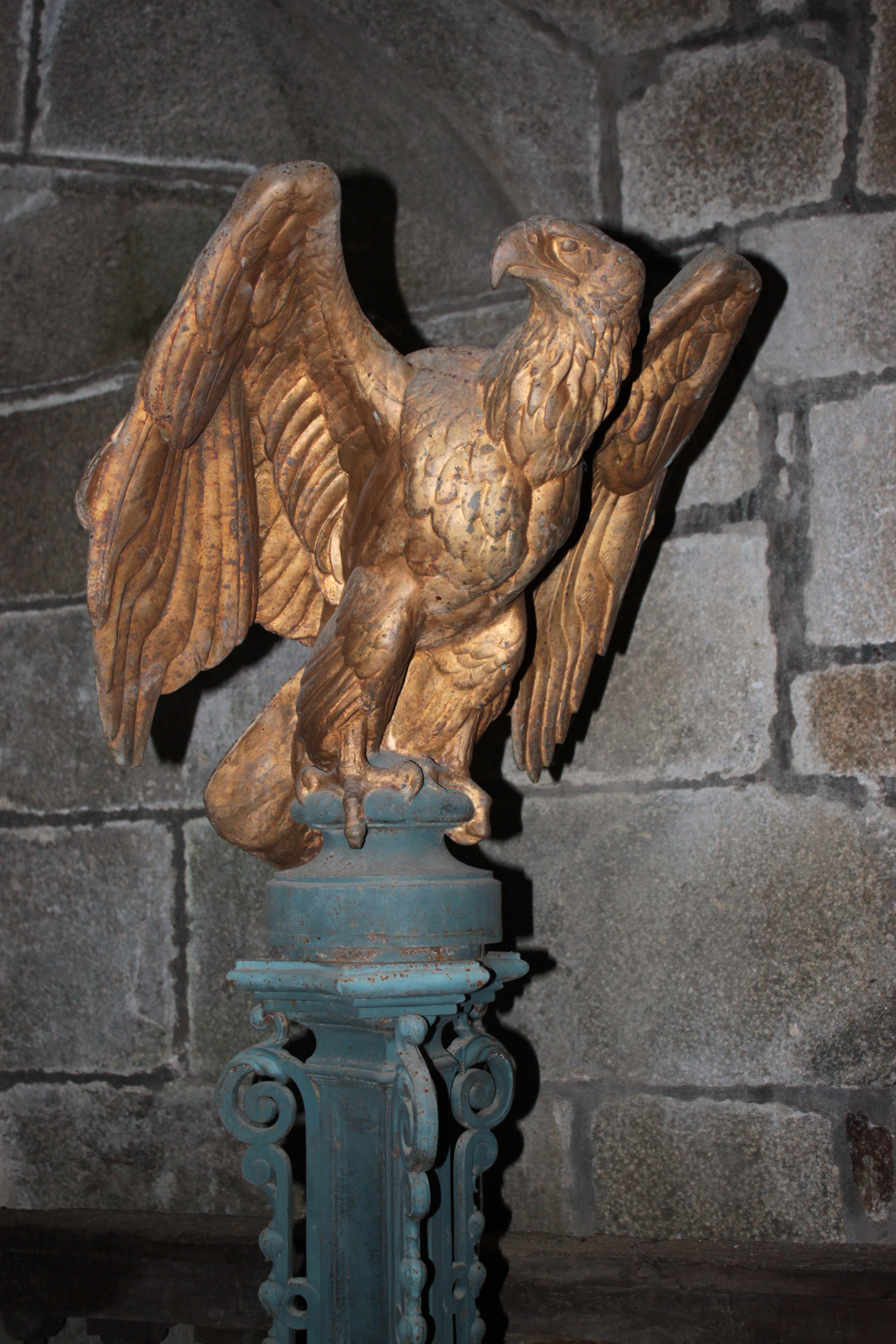
The eagle ambon

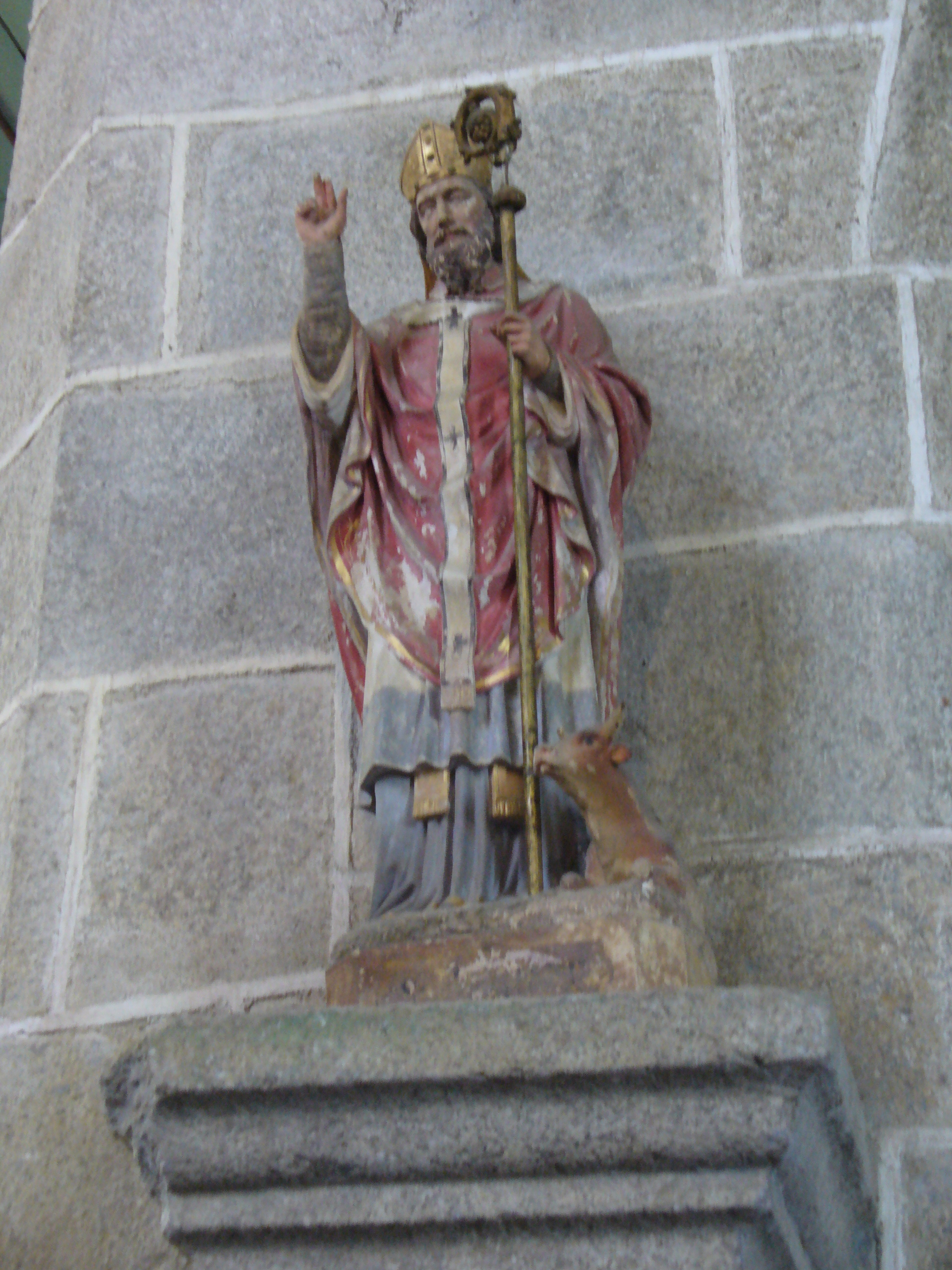
Saint Hervé with wolf

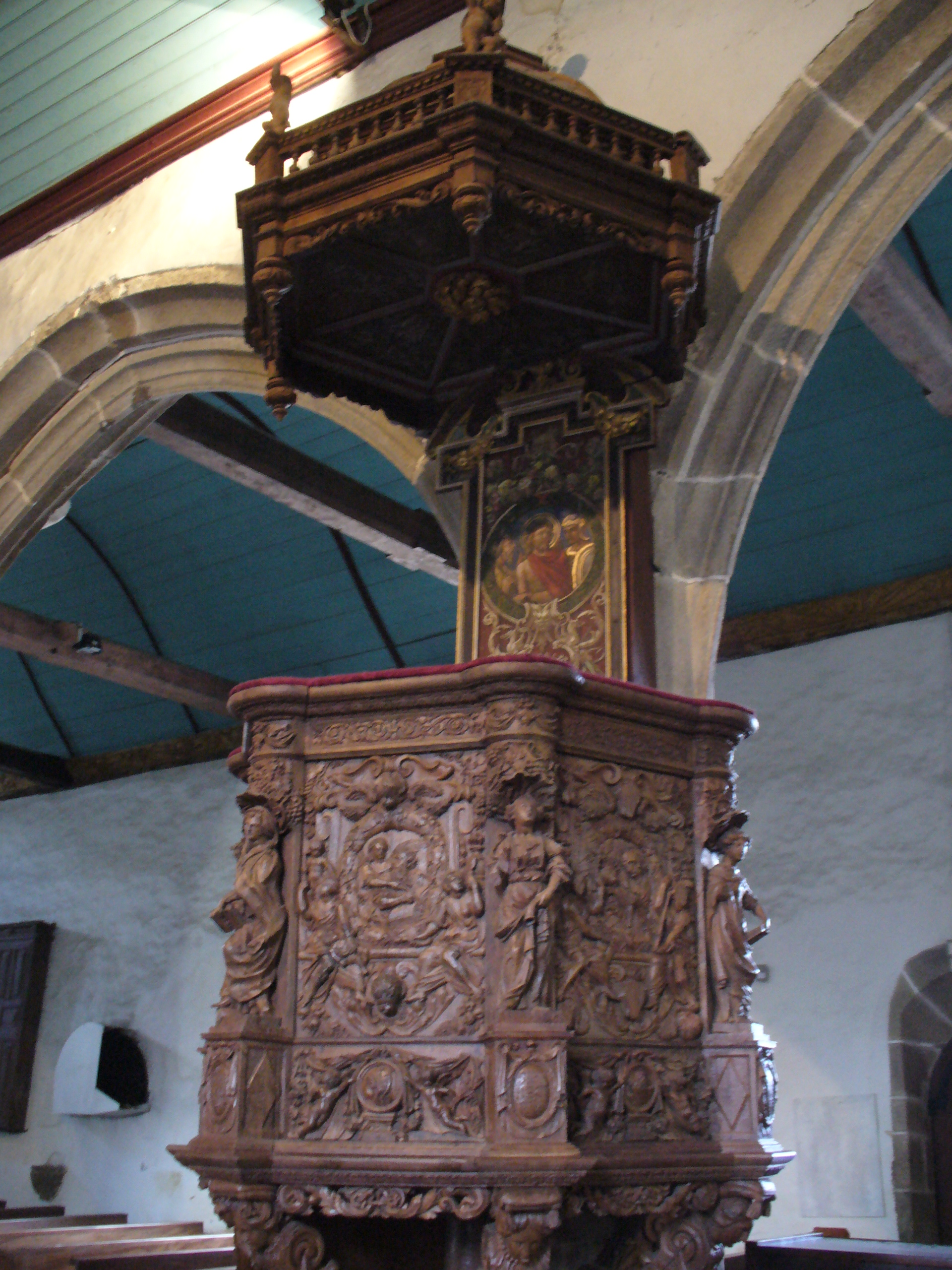
The carved pulpit

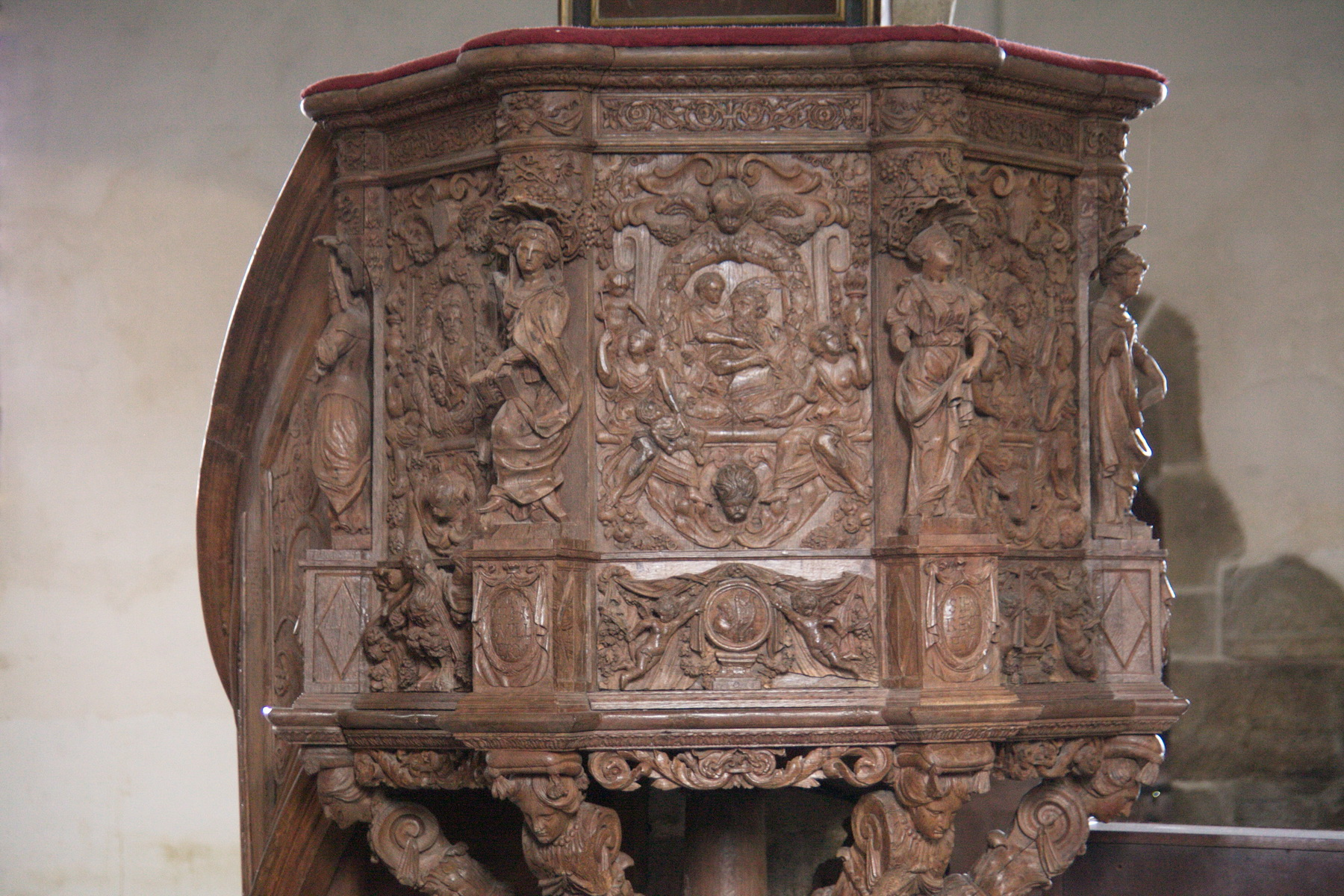
Carvings on the pulpit

== The Organ ==
This was built by Thomas Dallam in 1677. The casing is in oak with marvelous bas-reliefs. Facing the baptistery is the work "Triomphe d'Alexandre" and facing the nave the carvings include "David jouant de la harpe" and "Sainte Cécile touche l'orgue".

== The Baptistery ==
The baptistery dates to 1675 with a granite font. The baldachin is a fine work carved from oak with eight twisted columns decorated with birds, snails, snakes and grapes and a variety of other carvings.

== The Sacristy ==
This dates to 1683 and has a round conical roof dome, flanked with four semi-cupolas separated by buttresses. Above the building there is a statue of saint Miliau.

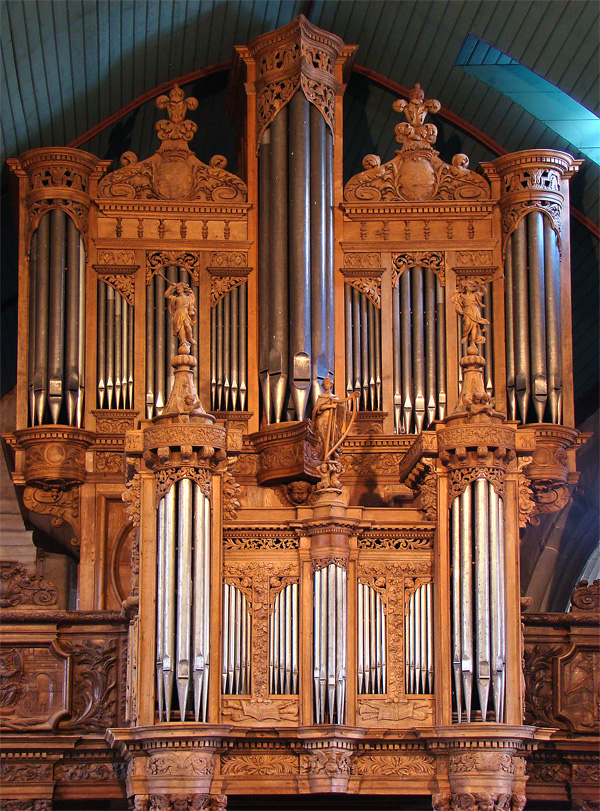
The organ at Guimiliau

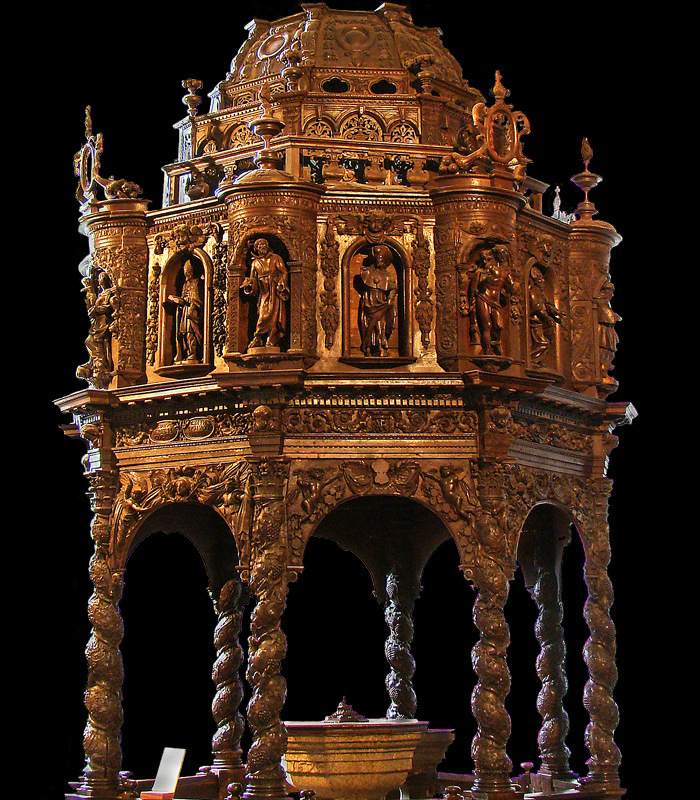
Baptismal font with Baldachin

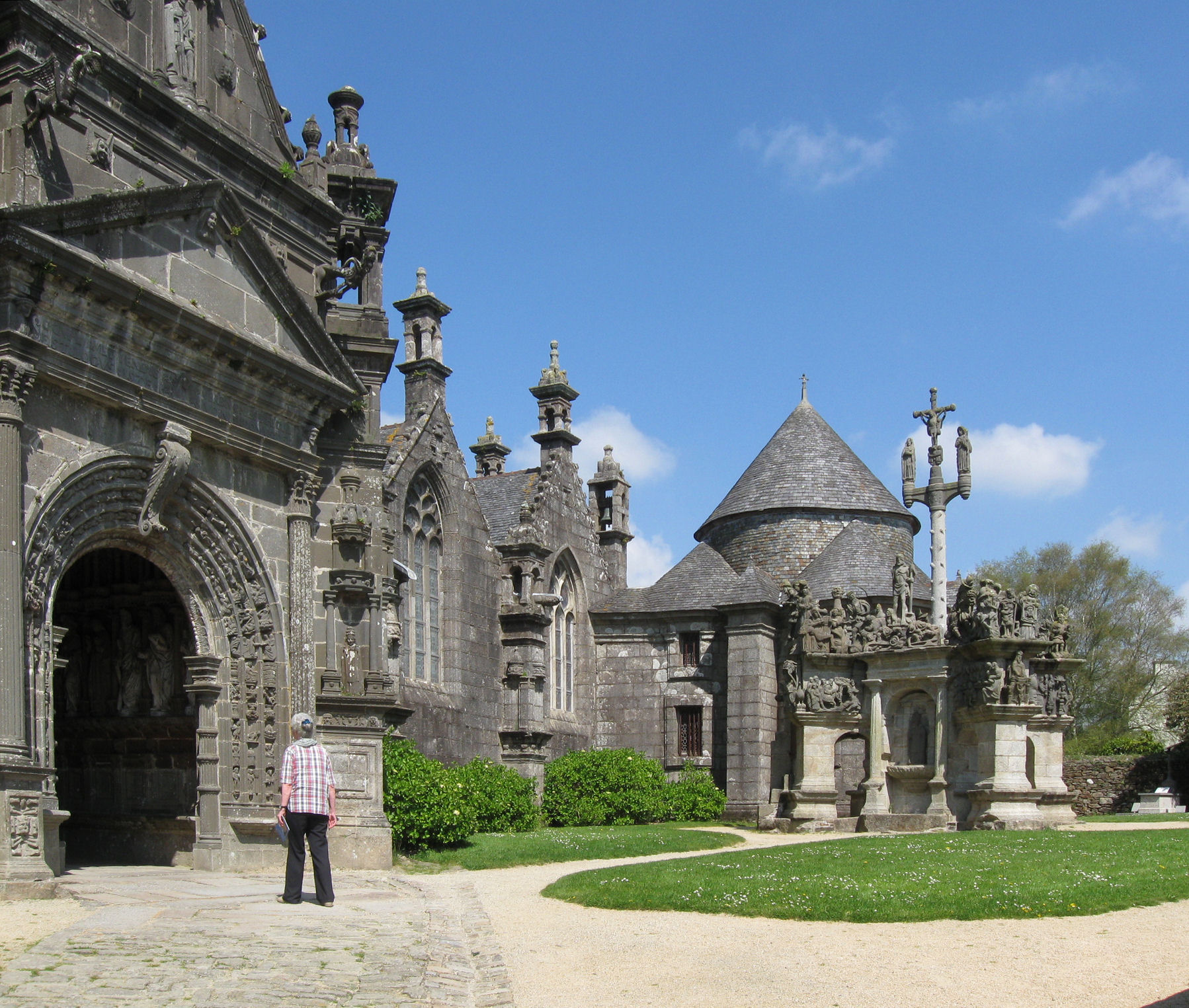
The sacristy

== Saint Anne funeral chapel ==
This chapel, dedicated to the mother of the Virgin Mary, was built in 1648. It has an outside pulpit so that sermons could be delivered in the open air. Bodies were brought here prior to burial and could thus be isolated, particularly where death was from cholera or the plague.

There is a granite altar dating to 1644 inside the chapel with an altarpiece dedicated to Saint Anne. This is decorated with a carving of the Virgin Mary with child and a "Christ aux liens" (that moment when Christ stands or sits alone, his hands tied and awaiting his crucifixion). These are to the left and right of the central sculpture showing Saint Anne with her daughter.

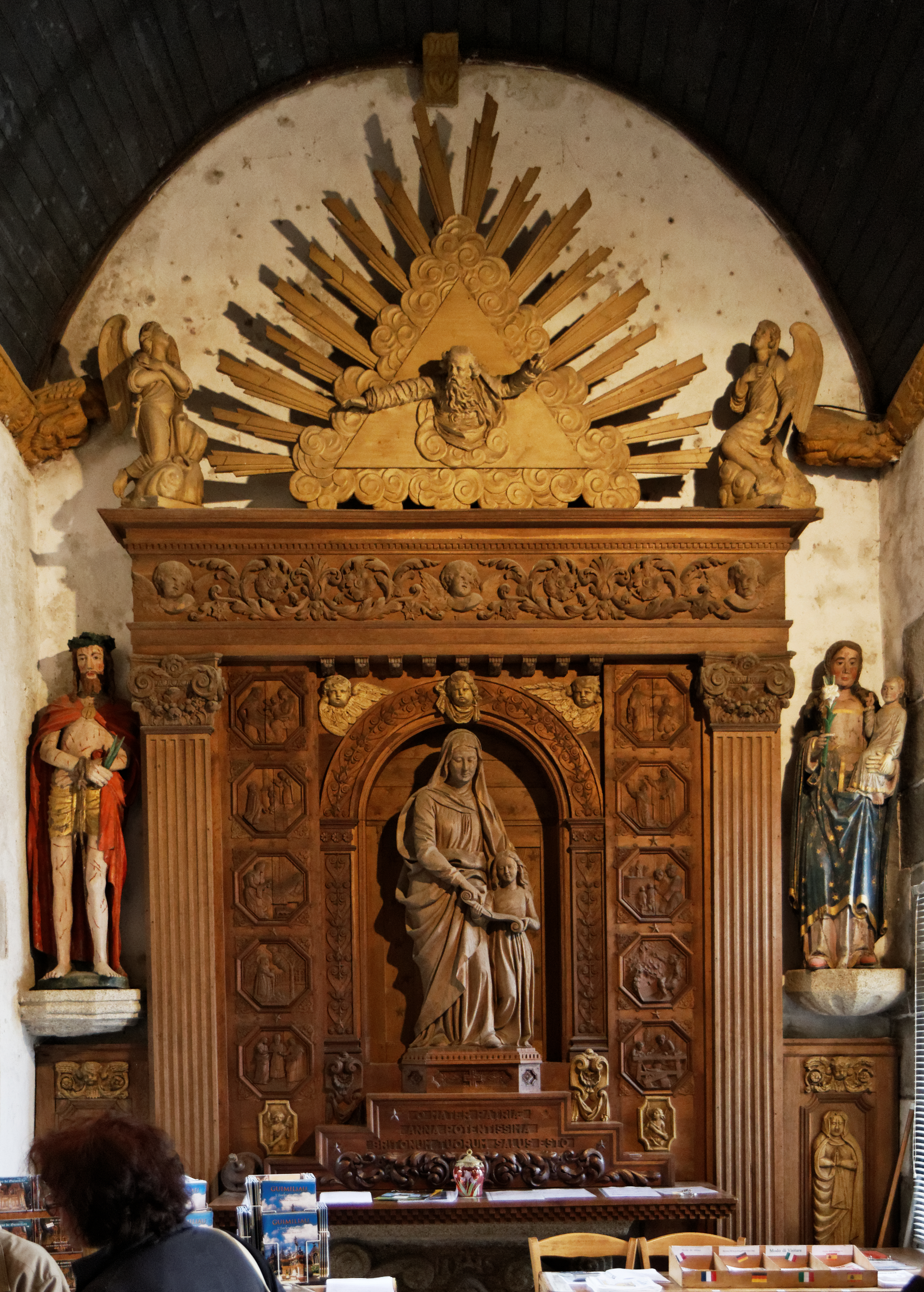
The Saint Anne altarpiece

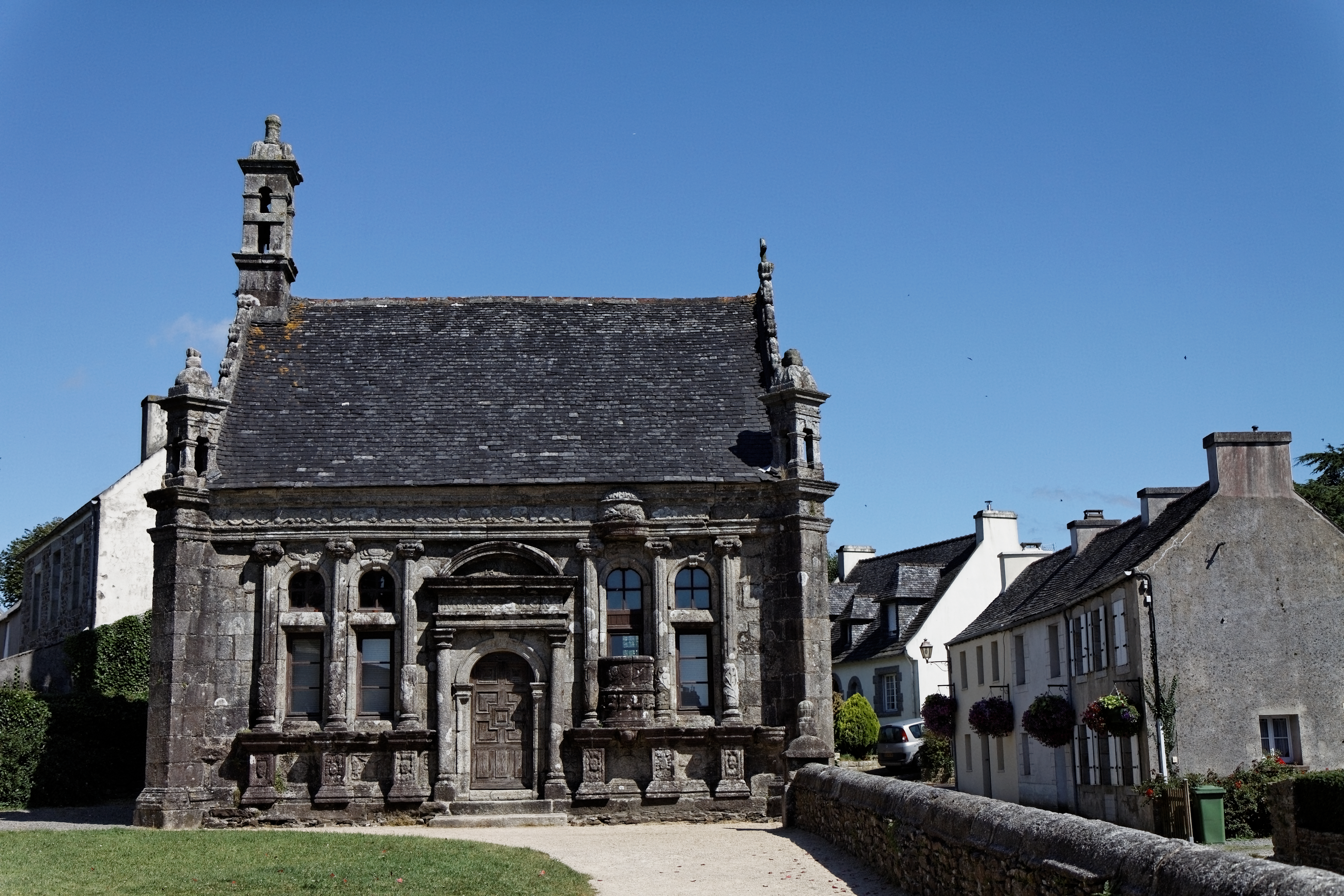
The Saint Anne chapel

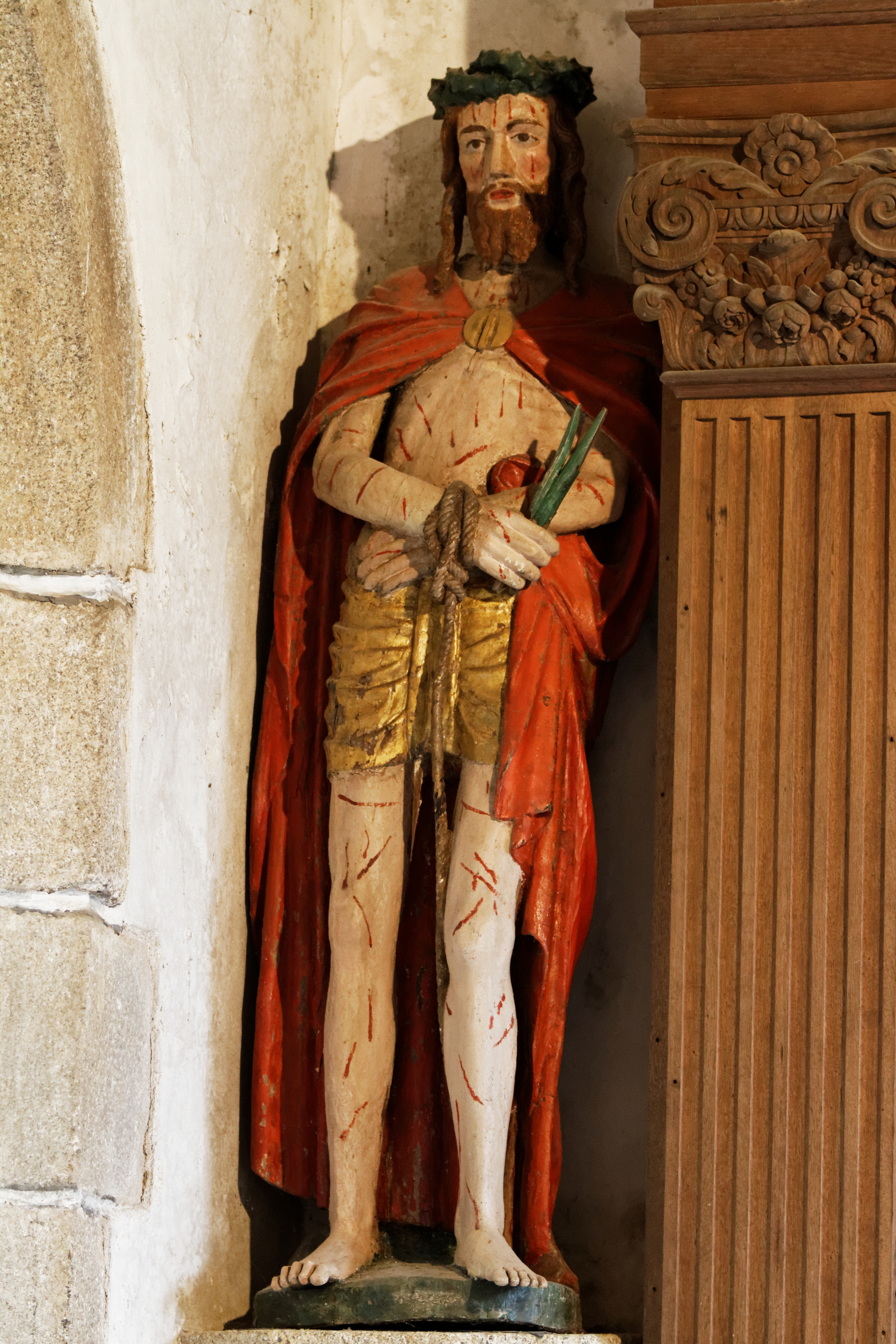
Jesus, his body showing the marks of his flogging and wearing the crown of thorns, awaits the crucifixion. Part of the Saint Anne altarpiece

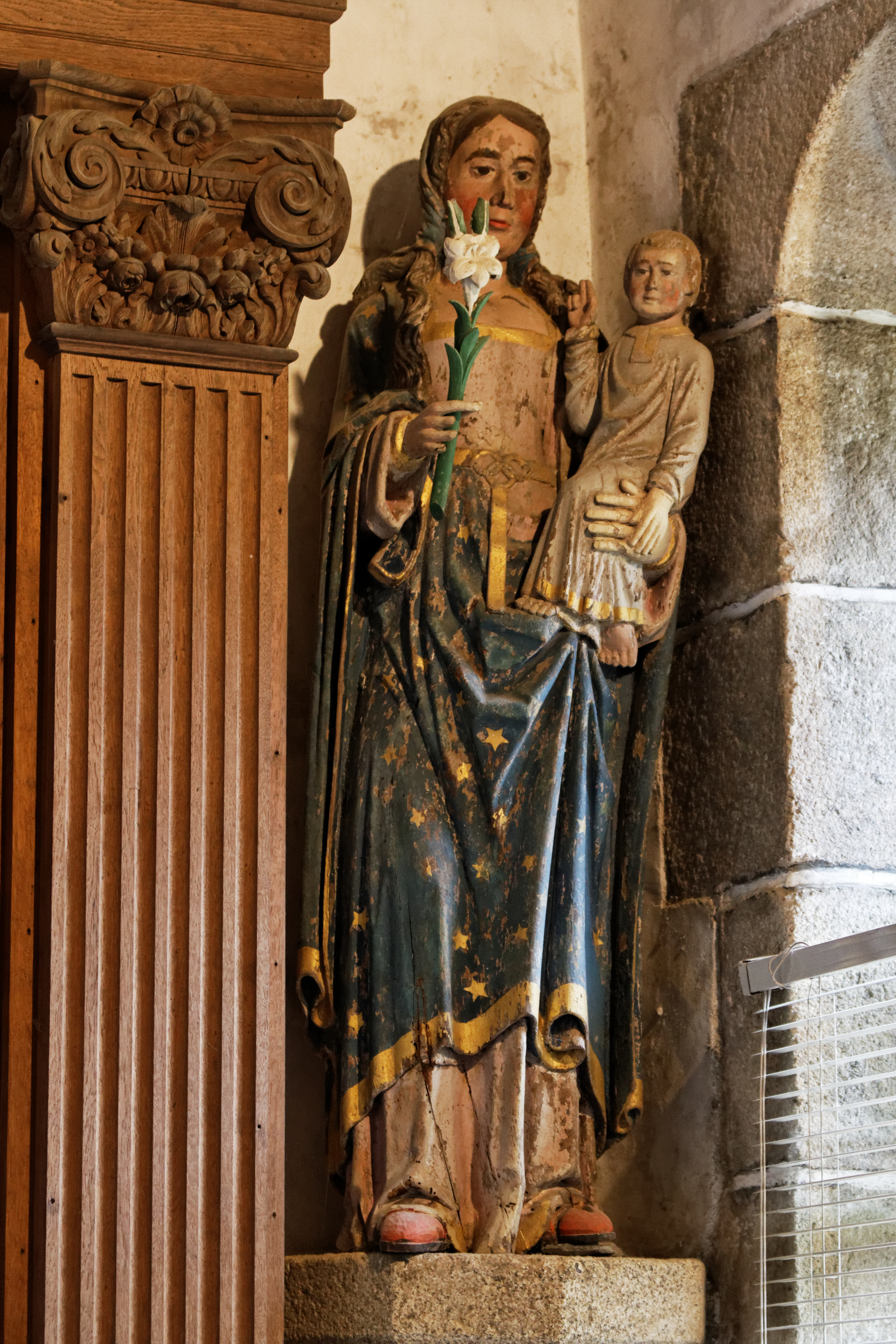
The Virgin Mary with child. A statue in the Saint Anne funeral chapel. Part of the Saint Anne altarpiece

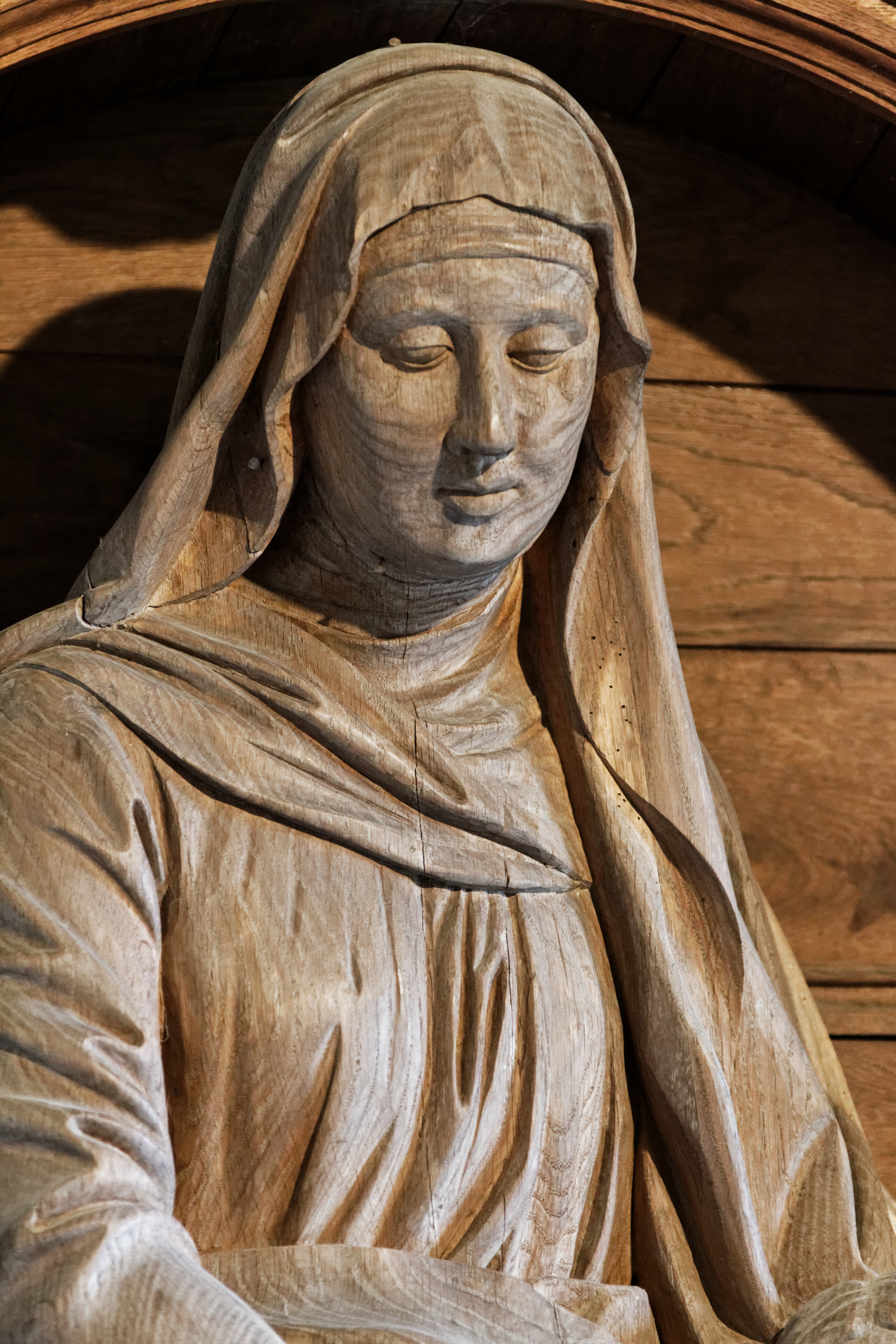
The central part of the Saint Anne altarpiece. The Virgin Mary with her mother

== The porch ==
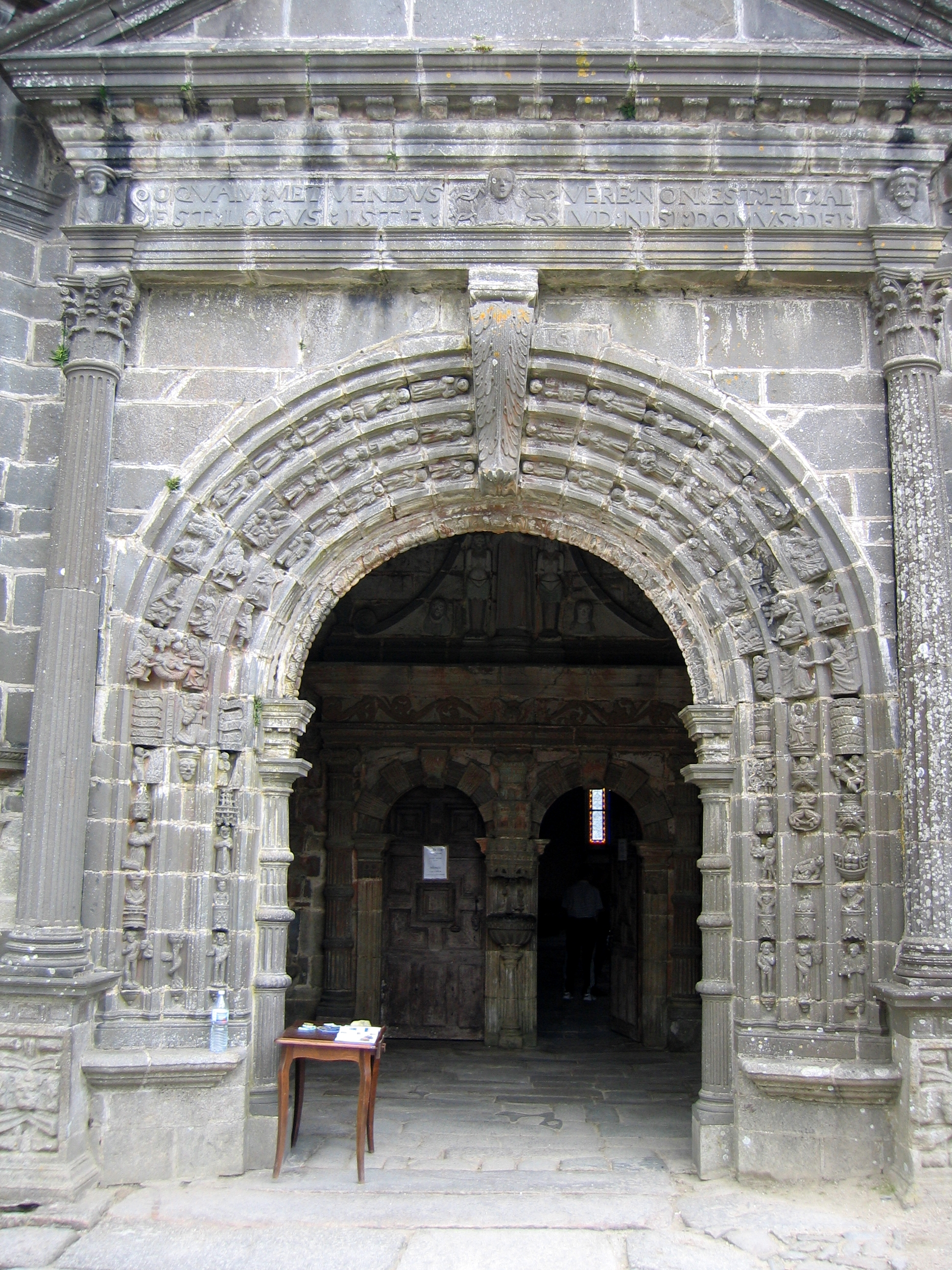
The entrance to the south porch

The bulk of the porch was built between 1606 and 1617 by the Maître de Plougastel and the finishing touches were added by Roland Doré (sculptor). The porch gives access to the nave and is in a mélange of Gothic and Renaissance styles.

On the outside of the porch there are two decorated friezes and two triangular pediments completed by two narrow gargoyles. There is a niche on the façade containing a statue of Saint Miliau sat on his throne and at the very top is a "clocheton" topped with a lantern. The voussures and piédroits of the porch's arch have carvings from the base upwards that recount stories from the Old and New Testament and these should be read by starting on the left side and moving across to the right.

These carvings start with the temptation of Eve on the left side and Adam and Eve's expulsion from paradise on the right. Next is a depiction of Eve as a mother and Adam as a labourer on the left and Caïn's murder of his brother coupled with Noah's ark on the right. Next there is a scene showing the sacrifices of Caïn and Abel on the left, with Noah collecting grapes on the right and then Noah is shown, clearly in drunken state with wine. We then move to the New Testament with the Annunciation, the Nativity juxtaposed with the visitation, followed by the Adoration of the Magi and the angels and shepherds attending Jesus' birth. Finally, on the left there is a depiction of the Flight into Egypt and on the right the Circumcision.

Inside the porch are statues of the apostles set in elaborate niches and Renaissance style daises. Under the apostles, there is a frieze with various heads depicting the cardinal sins and three reliefs. One shows a monk conducting an exorcism, another two wrestlers, and the third an amazing composition depicting God's creation of Eve.

At the end of the porch and above the two doors giving access to the church, there is a statue by Roland Doré of Christ giving a blessing ("Christ bénissant") with "termes gainé" of Adam and Eve on either side. The apostles, on the right as one leaves the church, comprise saints Peter with his key, James the Greater with pilgrim's hat and sea-shell, John, Andrew, Matthew, and James the lesser.

On the right side are depictions of saints Phillip, Bartholomew, Simon with saw, Judas with a palm leaf, Mathias with axe, and finally Thomas with set square. Of the various statues in and around the porch, Doré has been attributed with the statues in the outside niches of the monk and bishop, and the Pope as well as the statues inside the porch of saints Phillip, Bartholomew, Matthew, Simon, Judas, and Thomas.

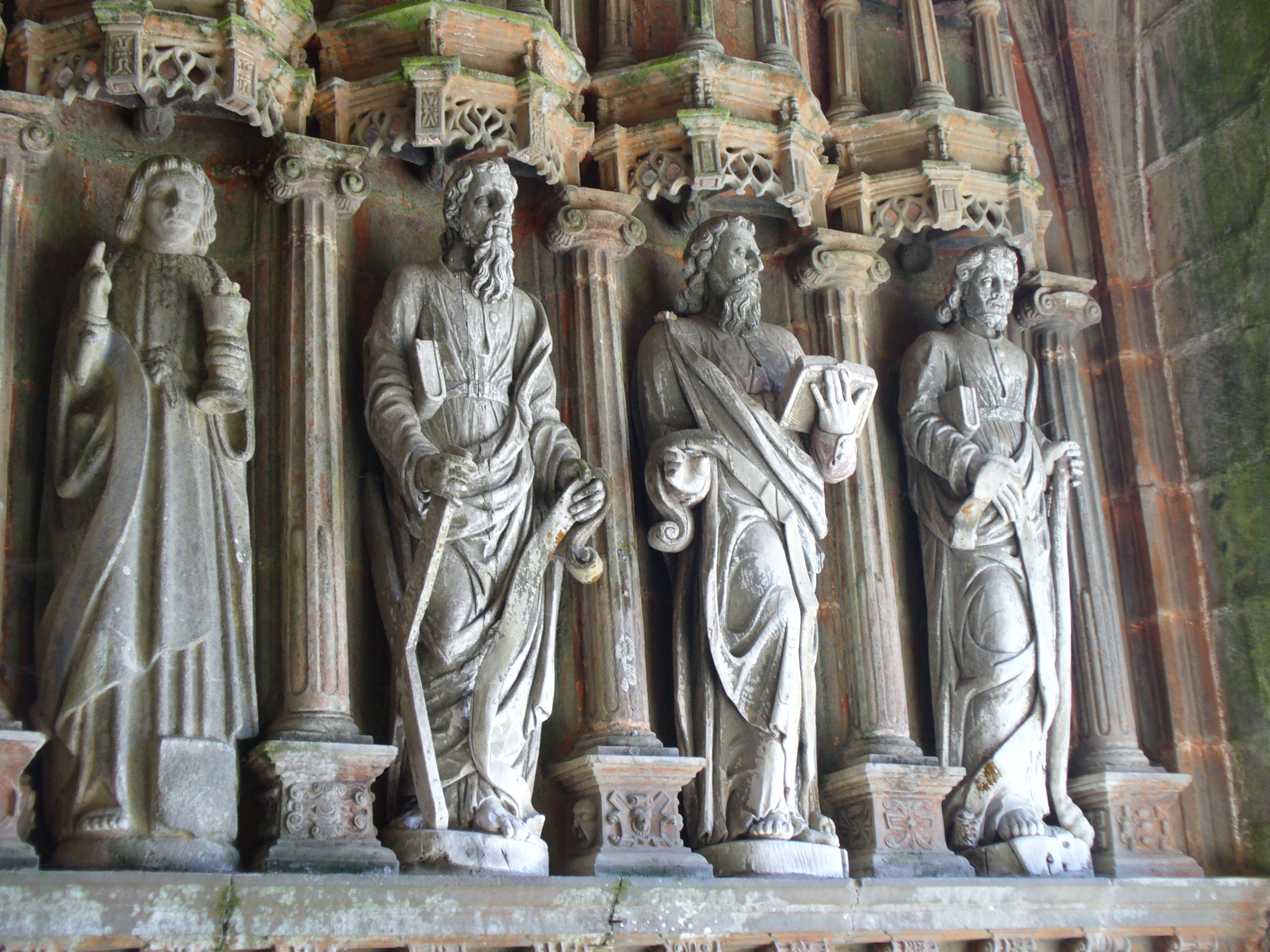
Some of the statues of the apostles in the porch interior

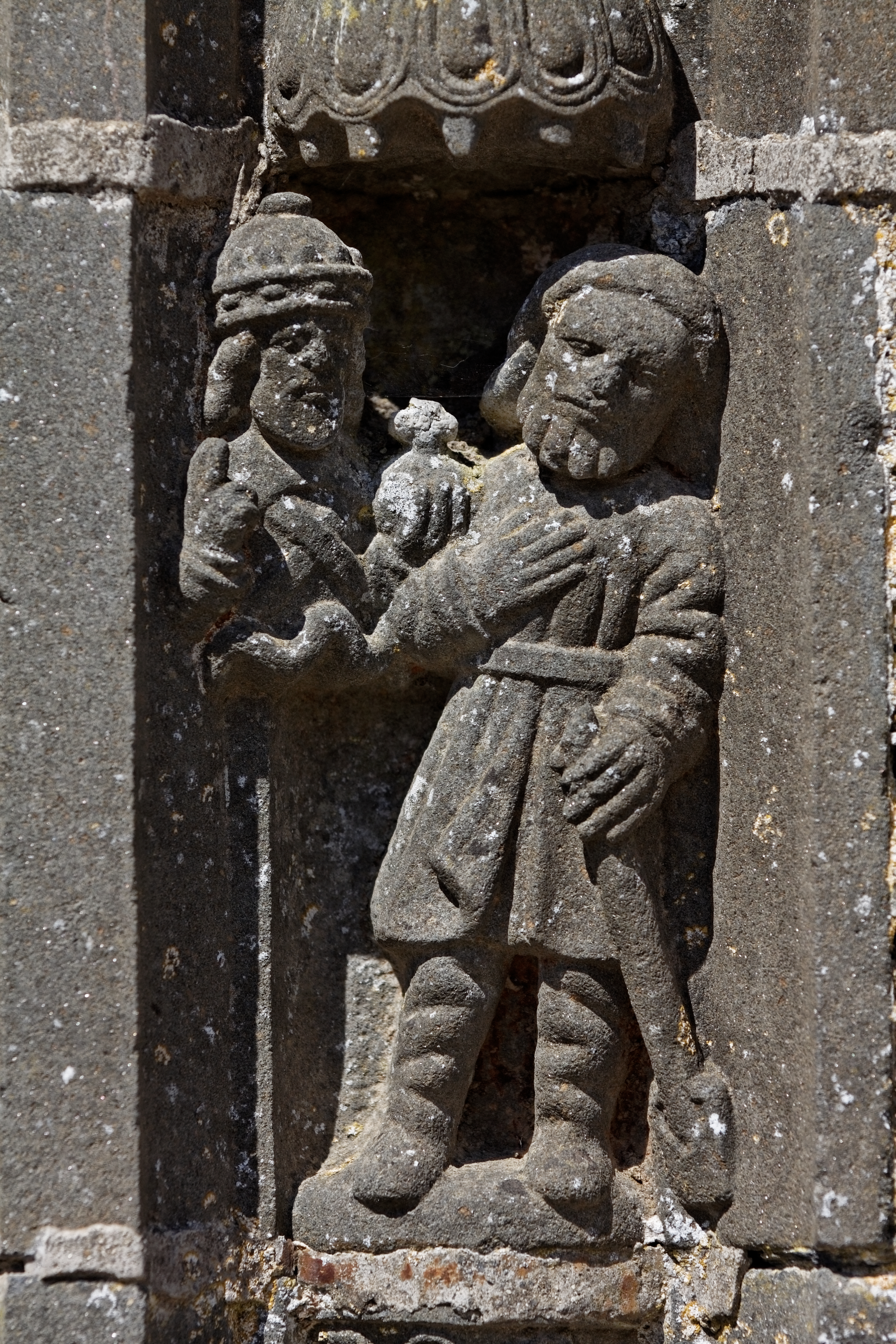
The south porch at Guimiliau. Part of the piédroit on the right depicts Cain's murder of Abel

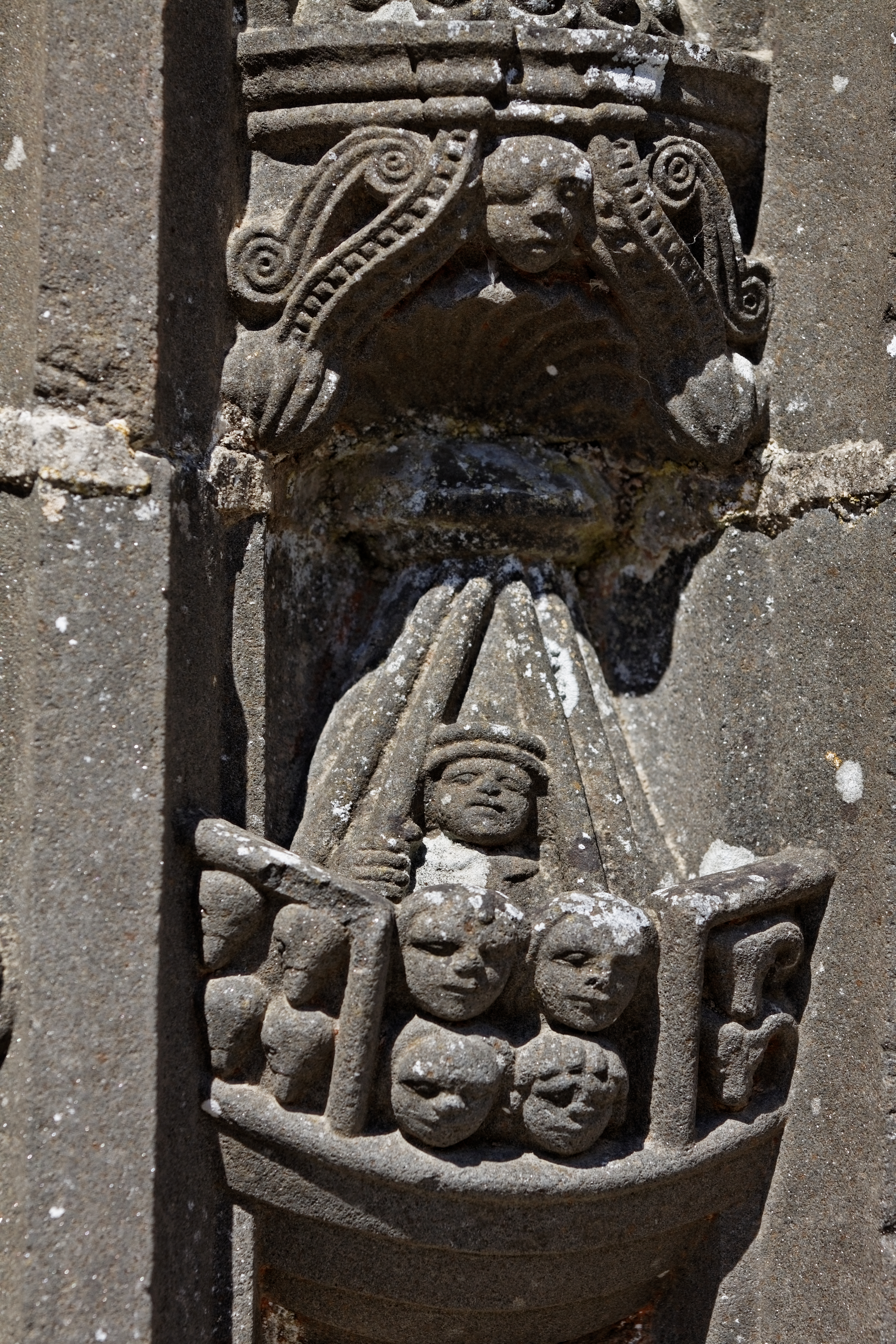
Alongside Cain's murder of Abel is this depiction of Noah's Ark.

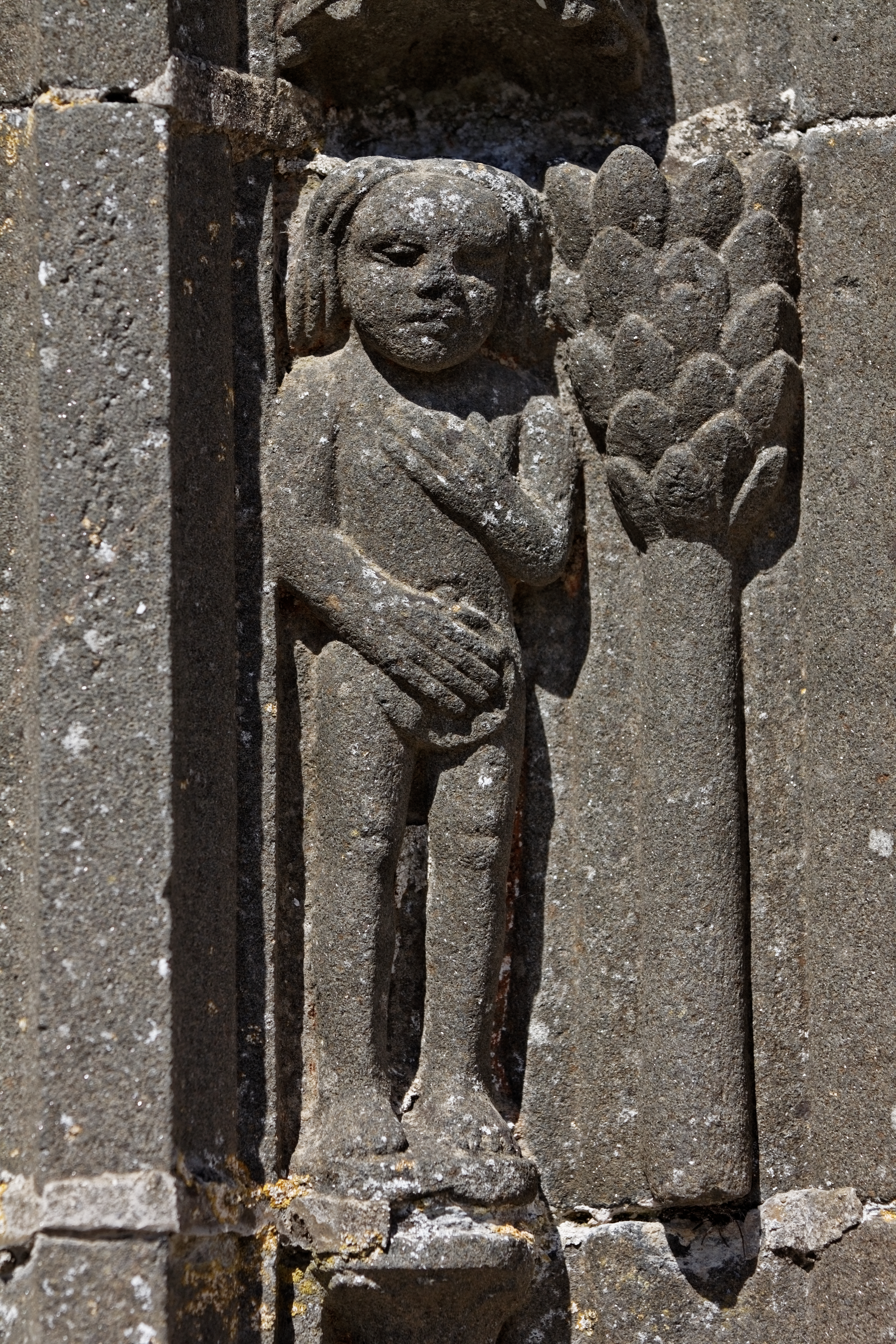
Eve has succumbed to temptation and with Adam has been thrown out of paradise. She is now painfully aware of her nudity and attempts to cover her vulnerability

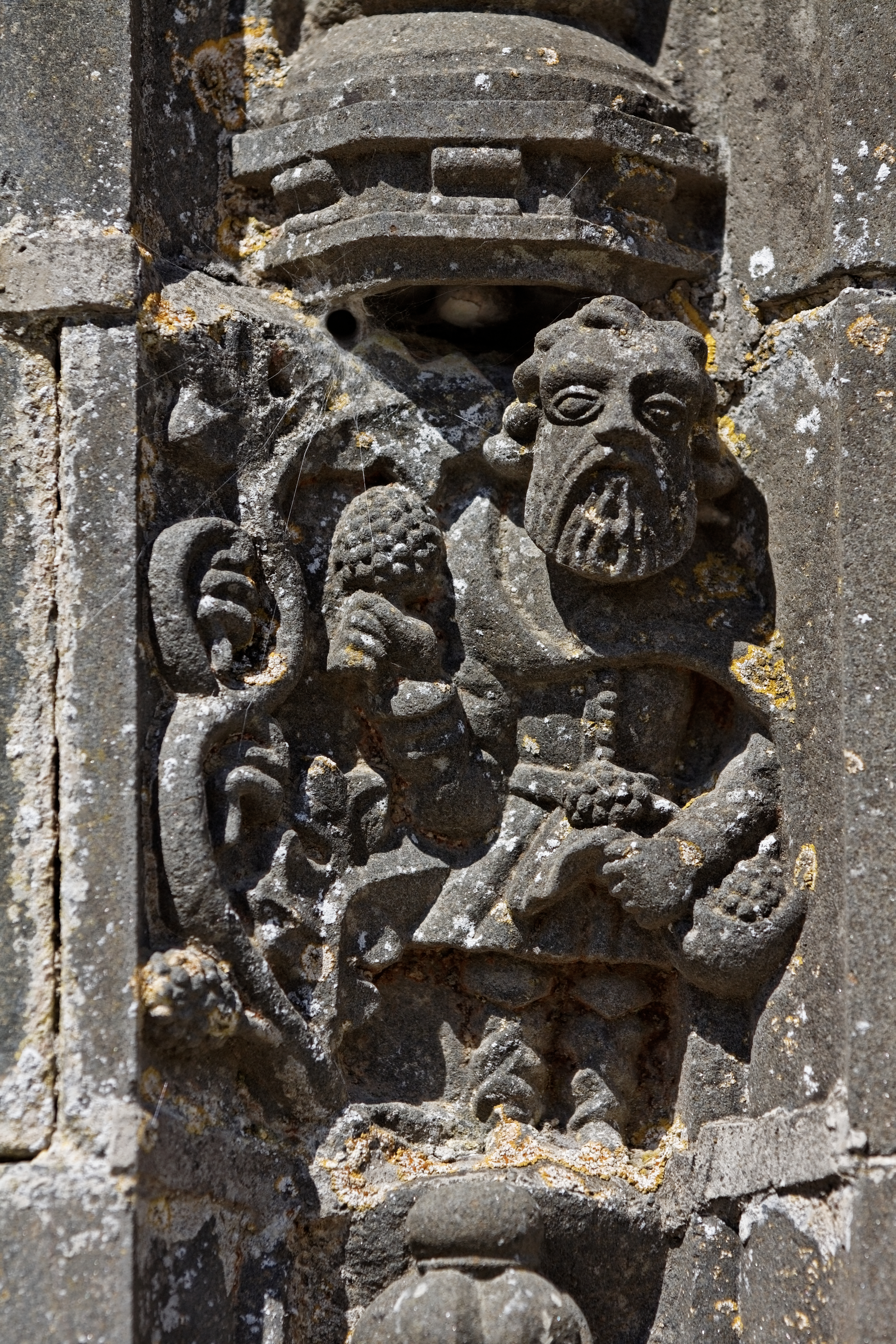
Noah collecting grapes

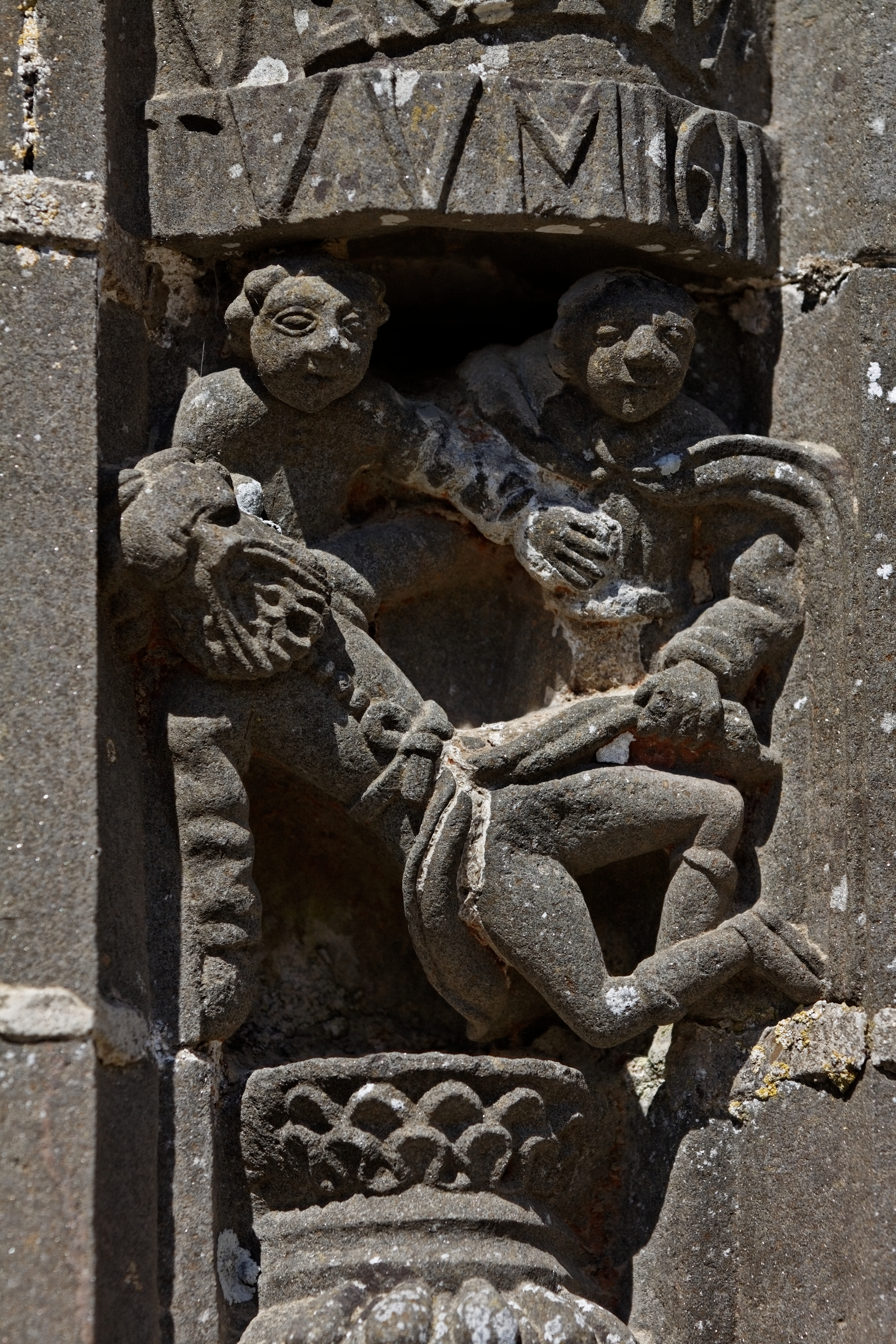
Noah is completely drunk

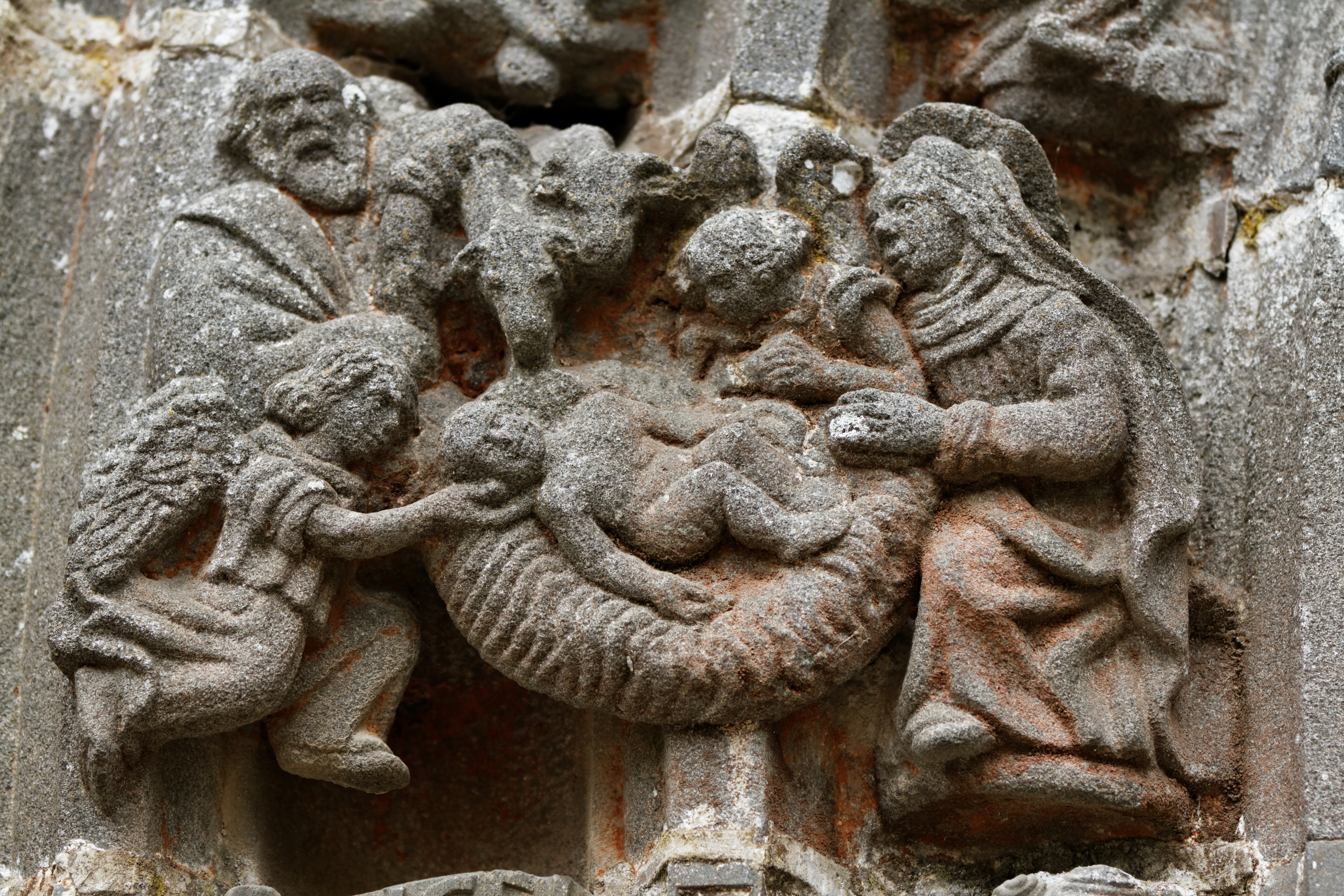
The Nativity

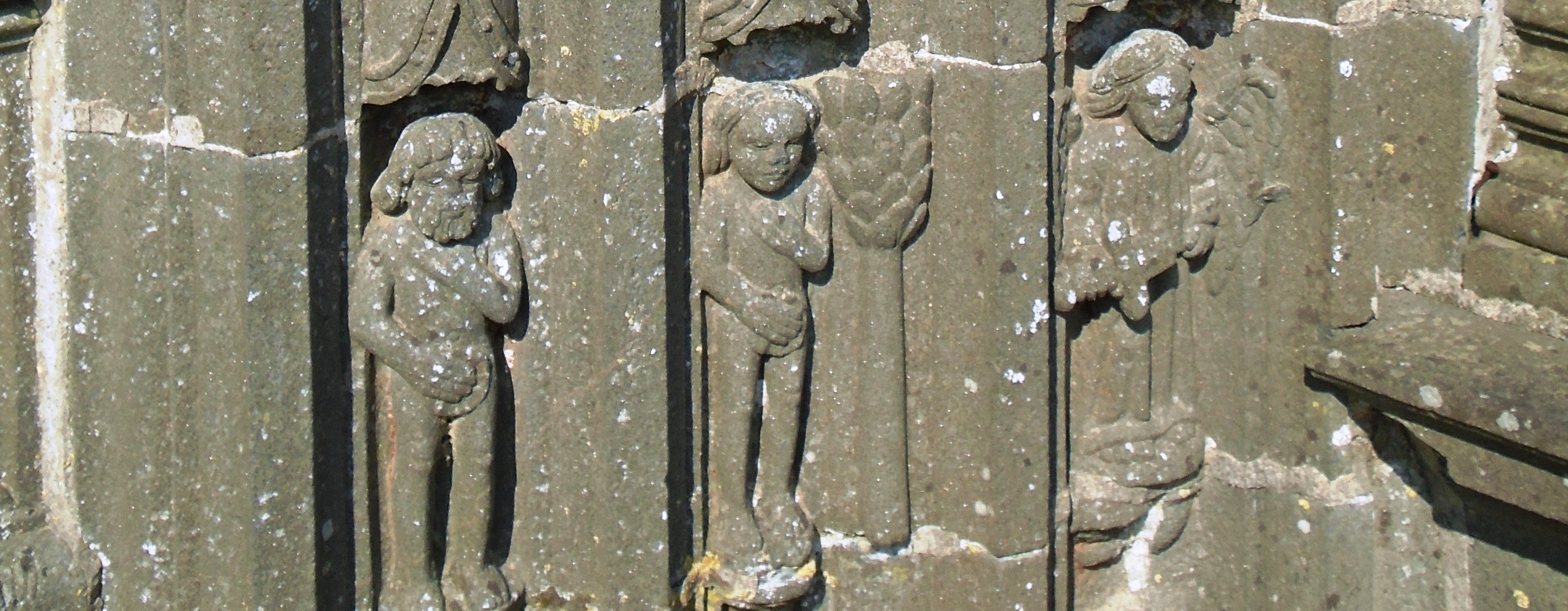
Adam and Eve are chased from the Garden of Eden. Now aware of their nakedness they cover themselves with leaves

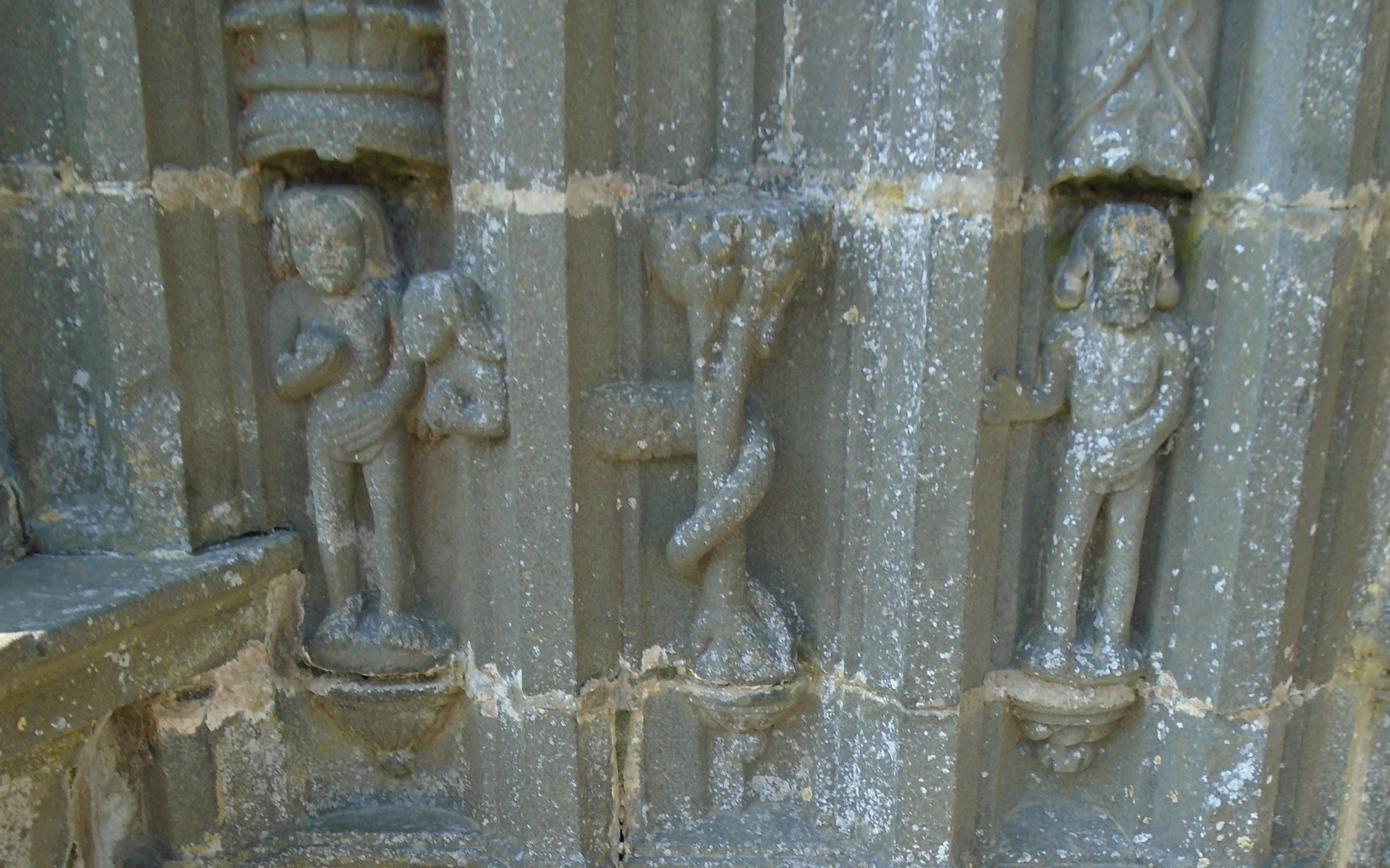
Adam and Eve with the Tree of Knowledge between them have been unable resist temptation and cover their nakedness

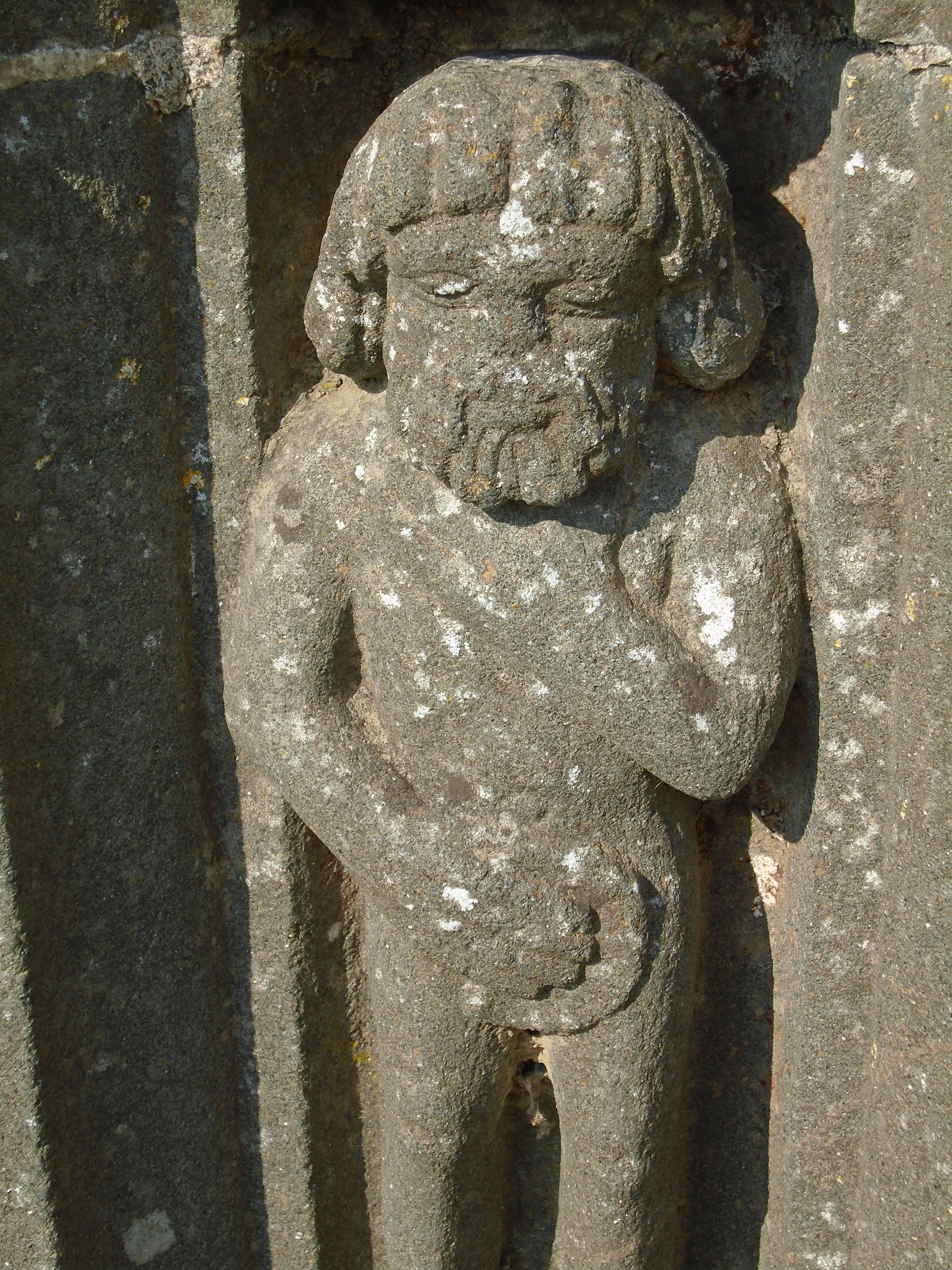
Adam is now aware of his nakedness

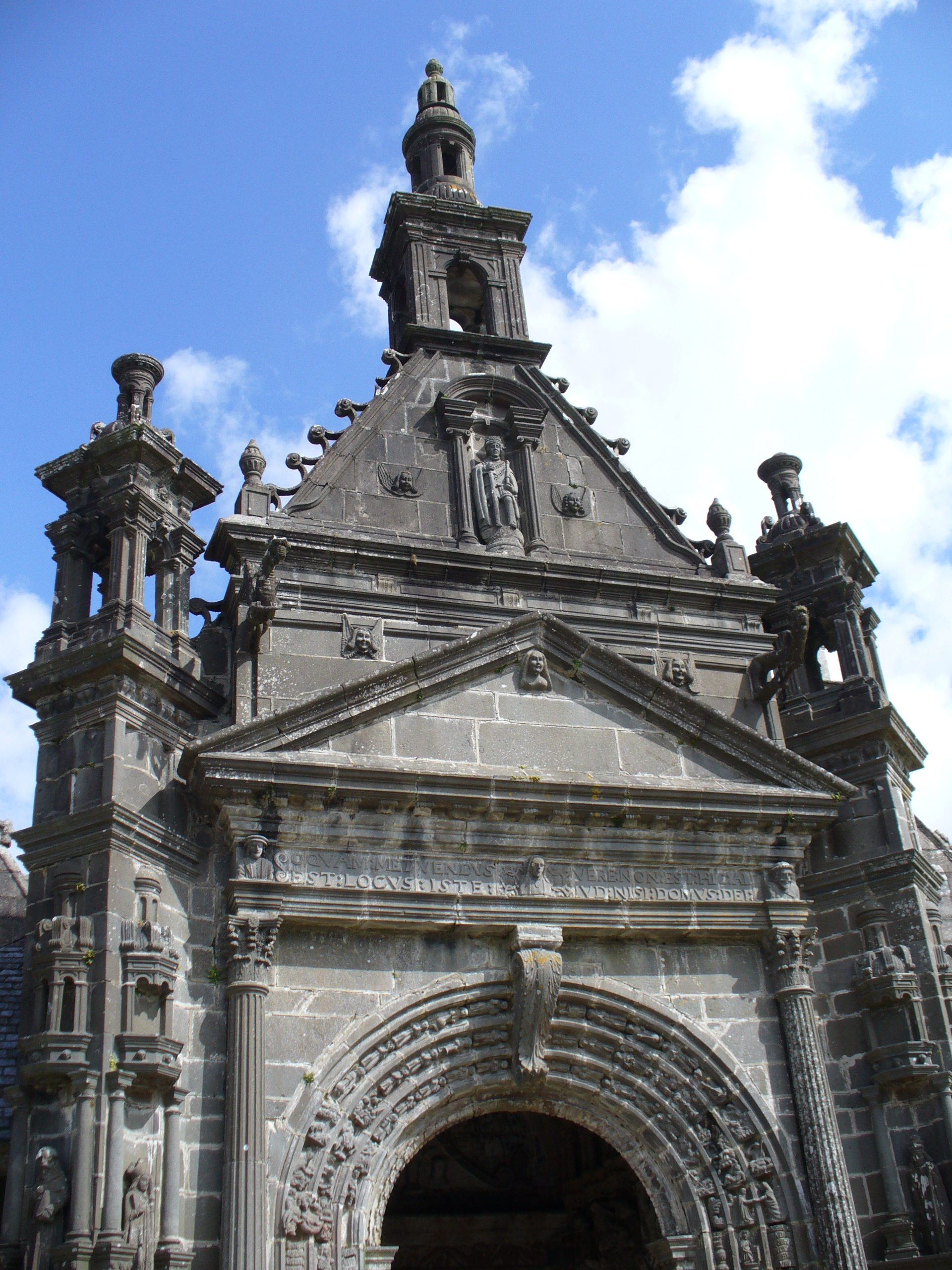
The front of the south porch. At the top of the pediment we see the bust of a woman and in the gable at the very top there is a niche containing a statue of saint Miliau

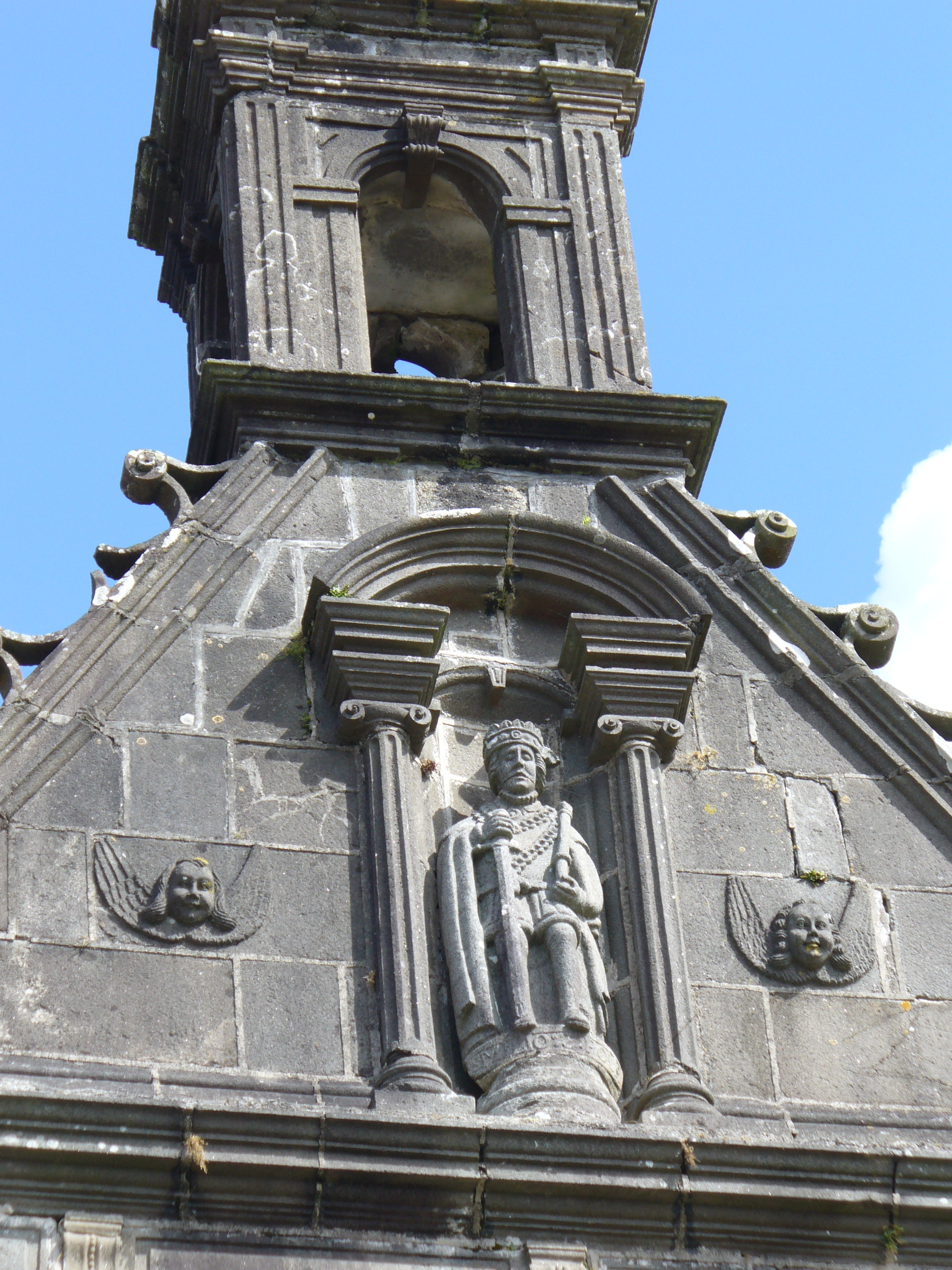
The statue of saint Miliiau

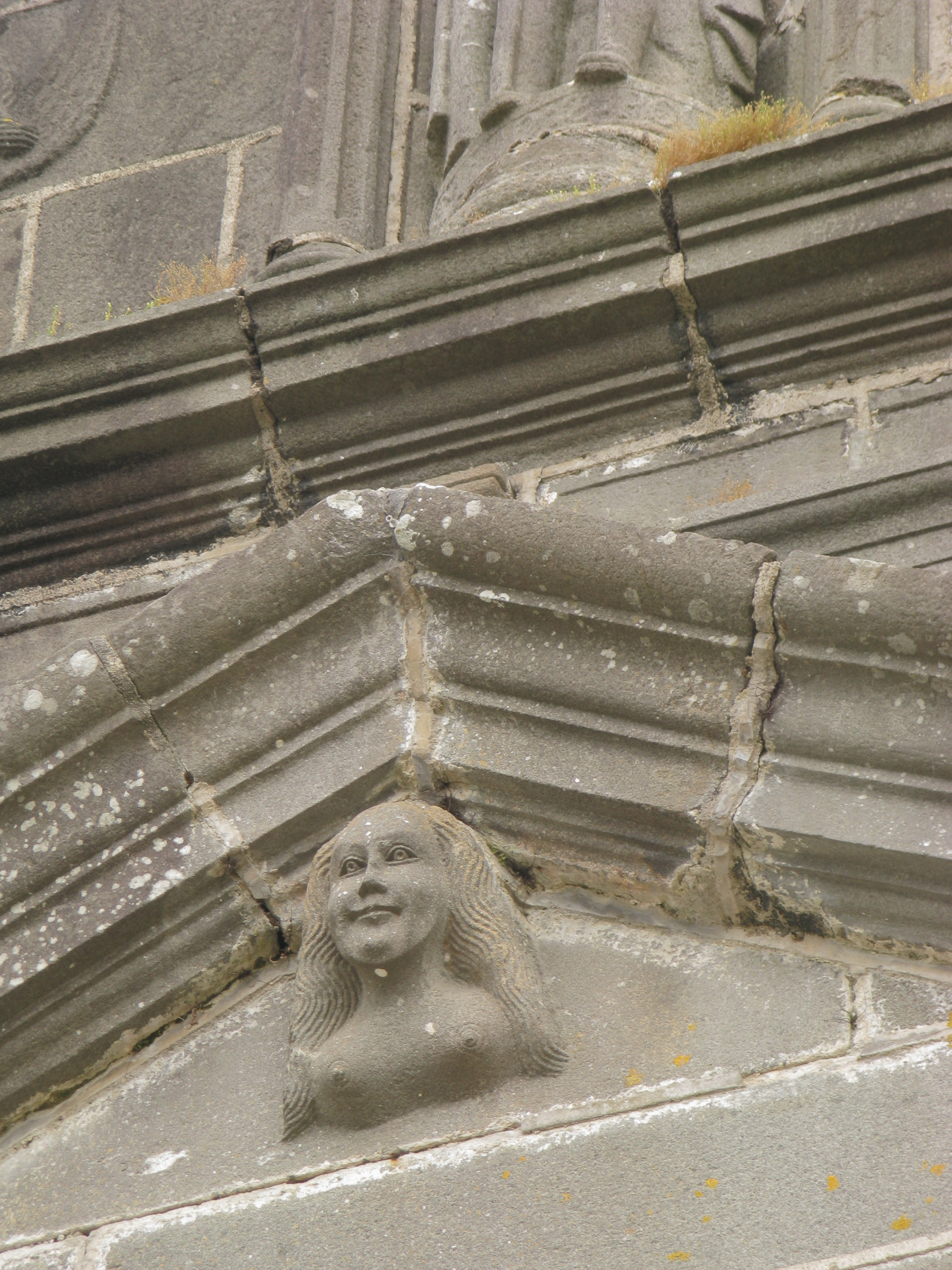
The woman in the south porch pediment.

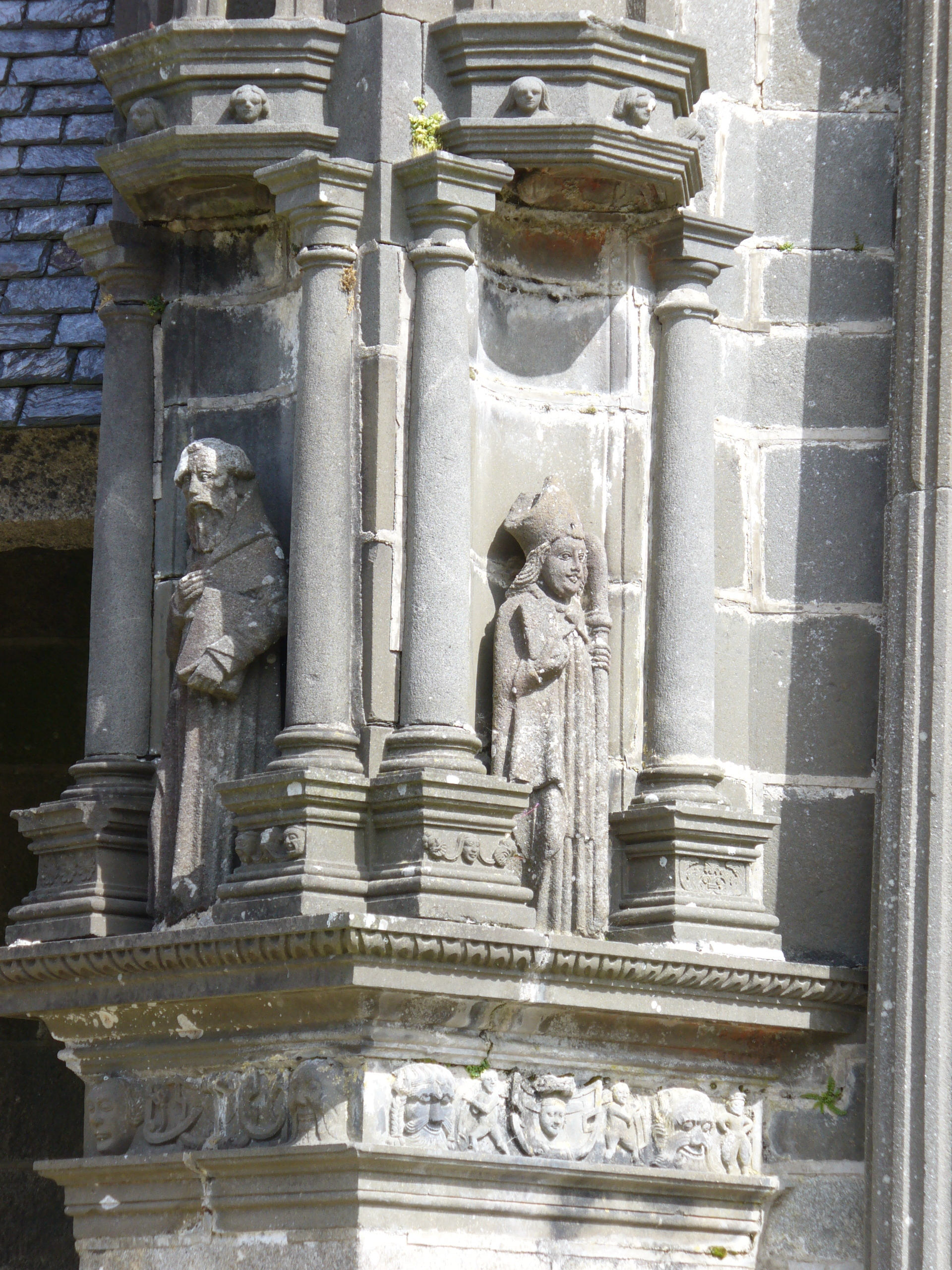
The right side buttress by the south porch. We see a monk holding a book in the left niche and a bishop in the right niche.

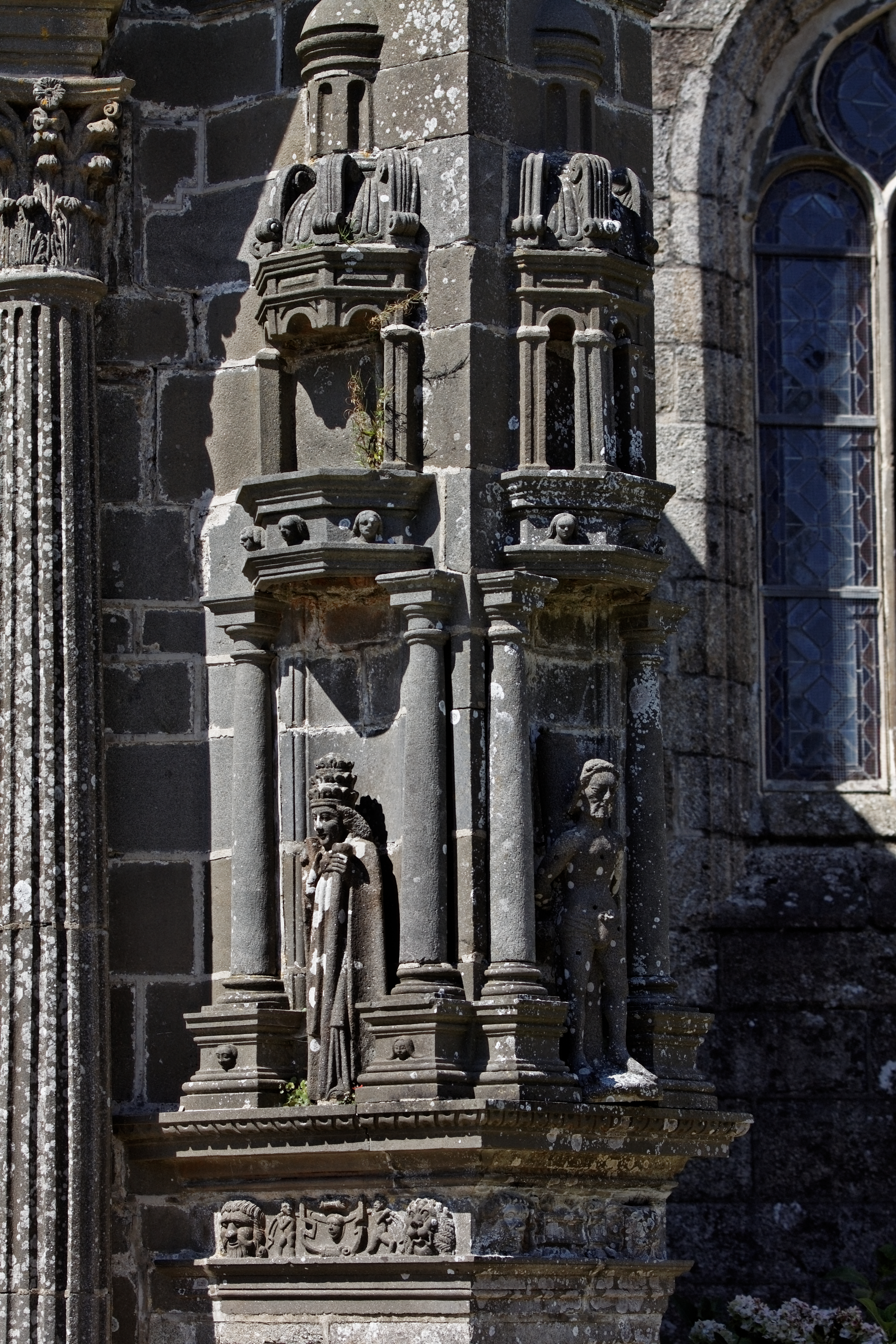
The left side of the south porch buttress

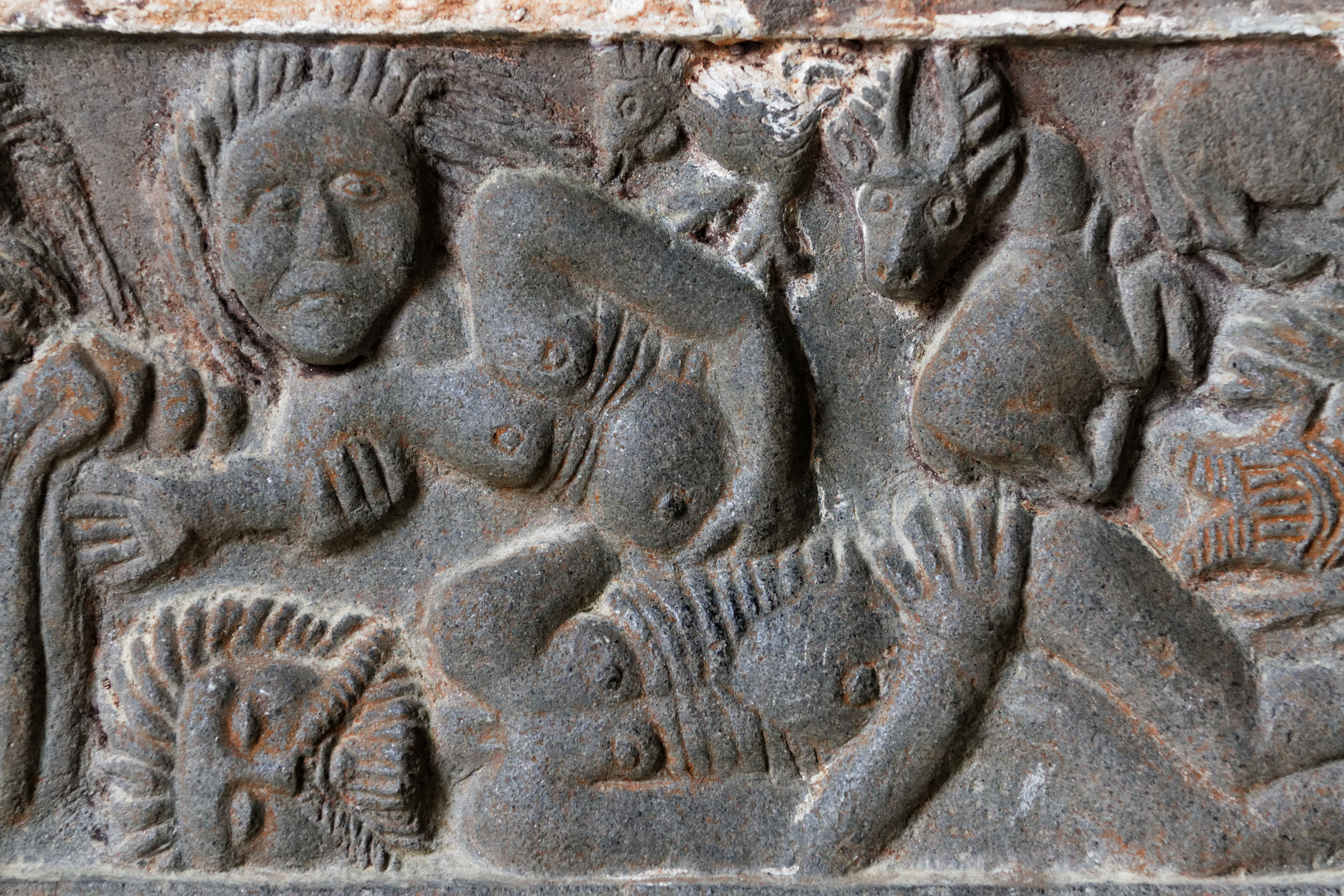
The frieze inside the south porch. Eve is born. God helps withdraw Eve from Adam's side by pulling on her arms.

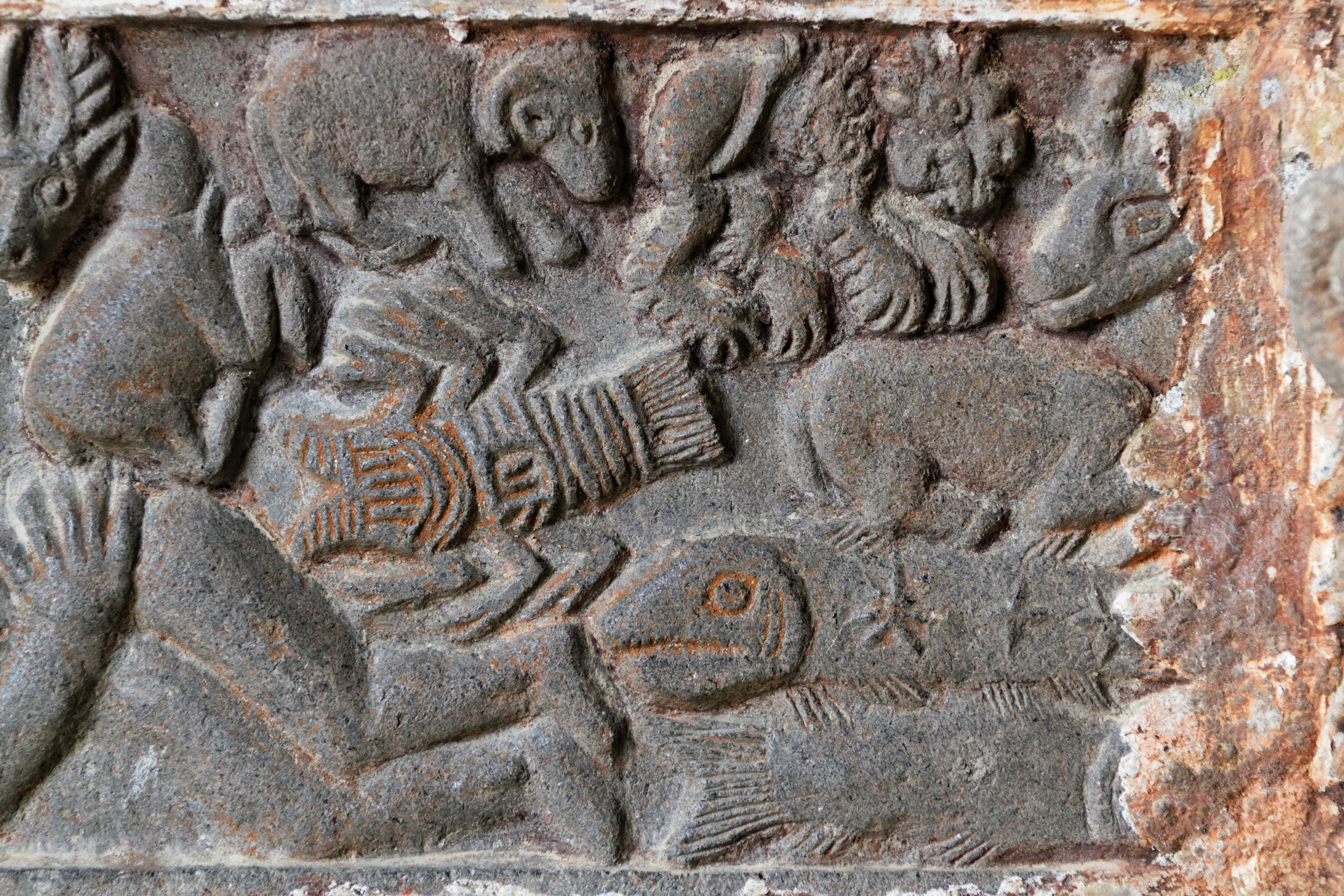
In the depiction of the creation, fish, deer and other creatures are depicted

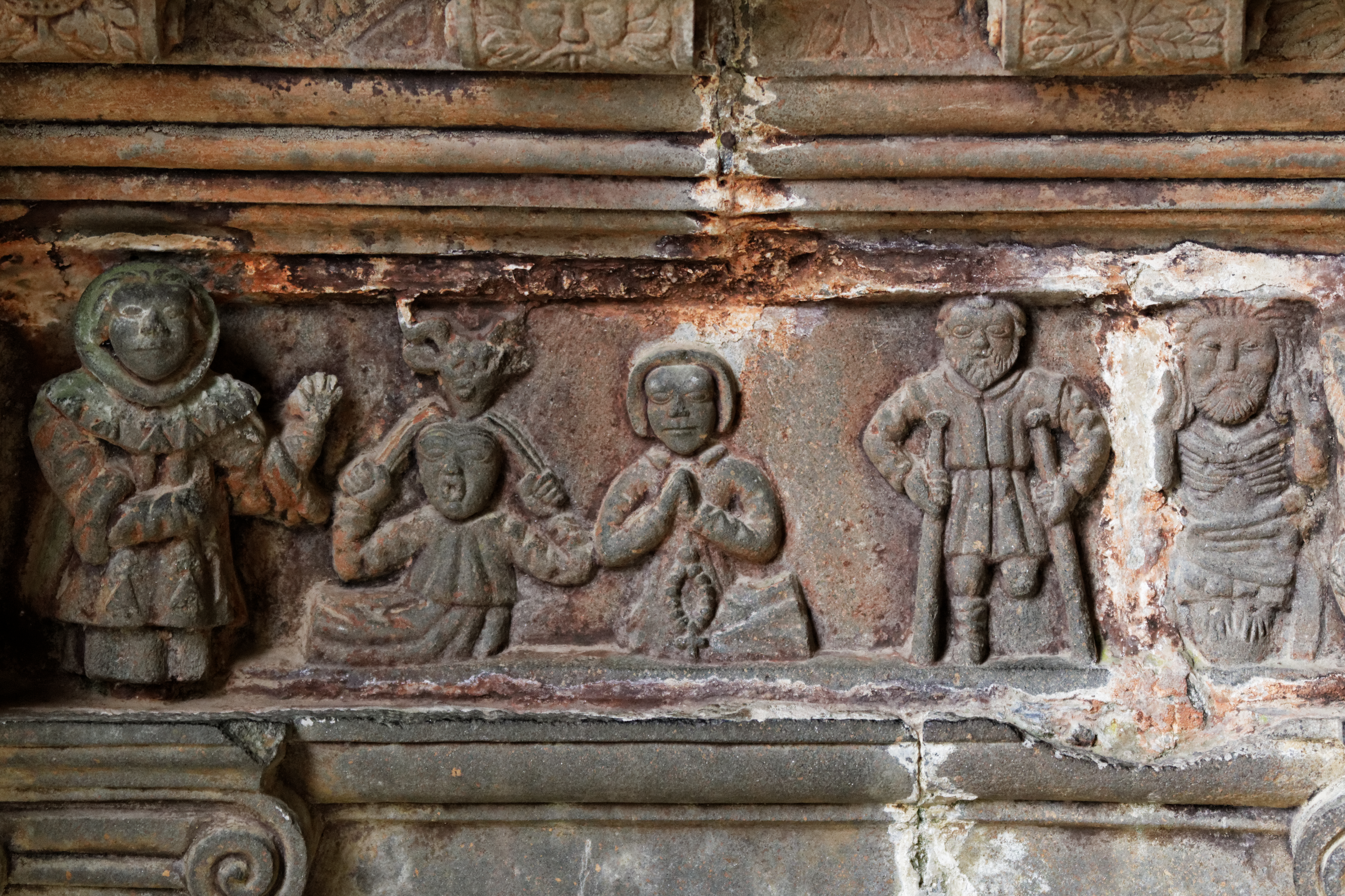
St Yves blesses four "unfortunates"

At the end of the porch interior, two doors give access to the church and between these two doors there is an elaborate stoup ("Bénitier") with a sculpture of an angel holding an aspergillum.
