= Saint-Herbot Parish close =

Parish close in Brittany, France

Coordinates: 48.3277°N 3.8092°W

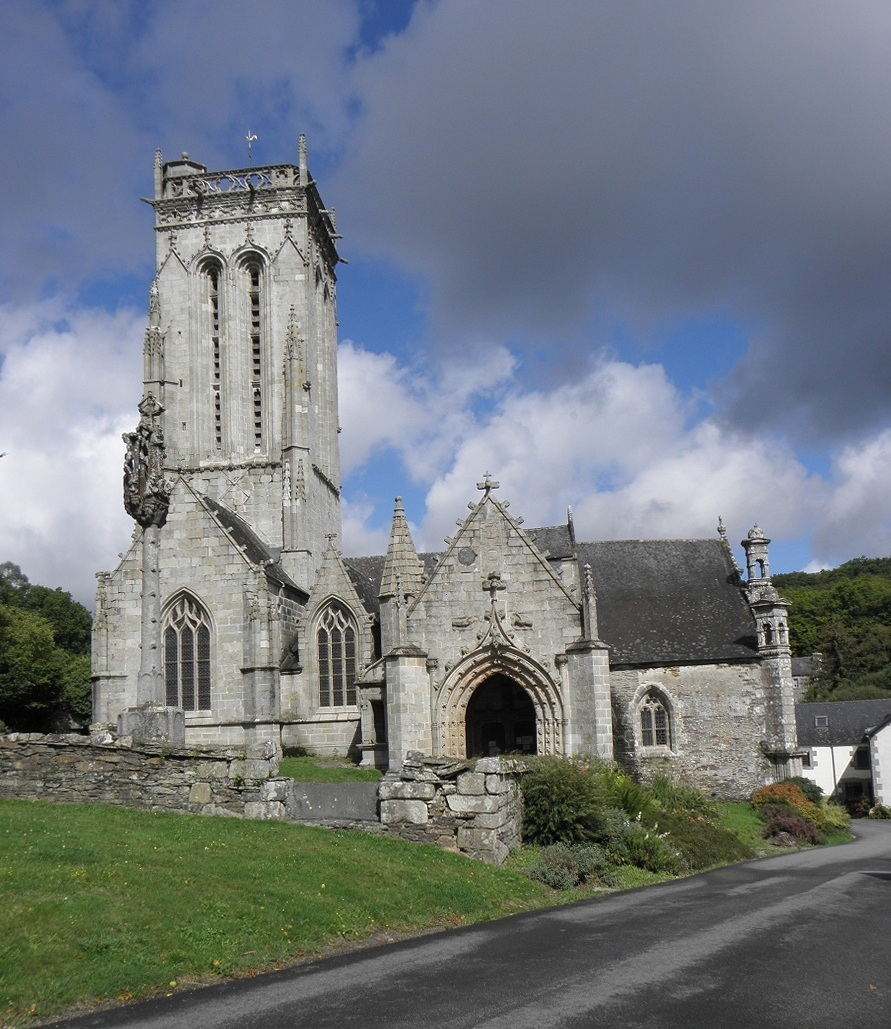
Saint Herbot church

The Saint-Herbot Parish close is a religious complex outside the village Plonévez-du-Faou, Finistère, Brittany in north-western France. It is located on the road between Huelgoat and Loqueffret. The parish close (French: enclos paroissial) contains the chapel of Saint-Herbot, the calvary and a small ossuary.

== History ==
The chapel has no transept and is rectangular in shape with five traverses with aisles and a flat chevet. Sponsorship from Anne de Bretagne was behind the addition of the south porch in 1498-1509 and the bell-tower porch on the western side. This sponsorship also funded the building of the neighboring chapel of Sainte-Barbe. The Saint Herbot chapel was enlarged in 1545, the chevet wall was rebuilt in around 1550 and the ossuary added in 1558 and many other changes were made in the succeeding years. There is a gisant In the chapel dedicated to Saint Herbot. The chapel was built in around 1389 on the site where St Herbot had his hermitage and where he is thought to have been buried. It had served as a priory but the original building was destroyed during the French wars of succession and a replacement was constructed in the 14th century. The architectural style is Flamboyant Gothic and the chapel has many treasures including a superb stained glass window depicting the passion which dates to 1566 and two other windows one of which depicts St Yves. A stairway leading to the door on the north side of the church dates to the 14th century and the porch on the northern side is 16th-century. The chapel has a 30 metre high bell-tower, erected in the 15th century, rather too large in fact for the building. This tower was said to have been inspired by Quimper cathedral. A domed turret was added to the tower in 1697. Inside the church the choir is separated from the main body of the church by an oak railing topped by a "poutre de gloire" ("Rood screen") and on each side of the door in this railing is a granite table on which farm workers were able to put tuffs of hair from their cattle as offerings to Saint Herbot (see later note). Near the chapel are the ruins of an 18th-century fountain, there is a small ossuary built in the renaissance style attached to the church and the calvary which dates to 1575 and stands in the middle of a "placître" (an area of grass) just by the chapel. The chapel's south porch is magnificent. The chapel holds statues of the Virgin Mary and Saint Herbot and in various niches Saint Corentin, Saint Sébastien, Saint Roch and a 16th-century Pietà.

== Description of the Calvary ==
All the Calvary's sculptures are grouped at the top of the cross' shaft. After the black death outbreaks of the 15th and 17th century, depictions of "bubons" were added to the shafts of the three crosses to ward off this dreadful disease. Bubons were the boil like sores which were one of the symptoms of the plague. The calvary dates to 1575 and is inscribed "Cest croix fut faicte l'an 1575 Mathieu Cravec PG". It bears the coats of arms of Kerlech Chastel and of Rusquec.

== The Calvary from the western side ==
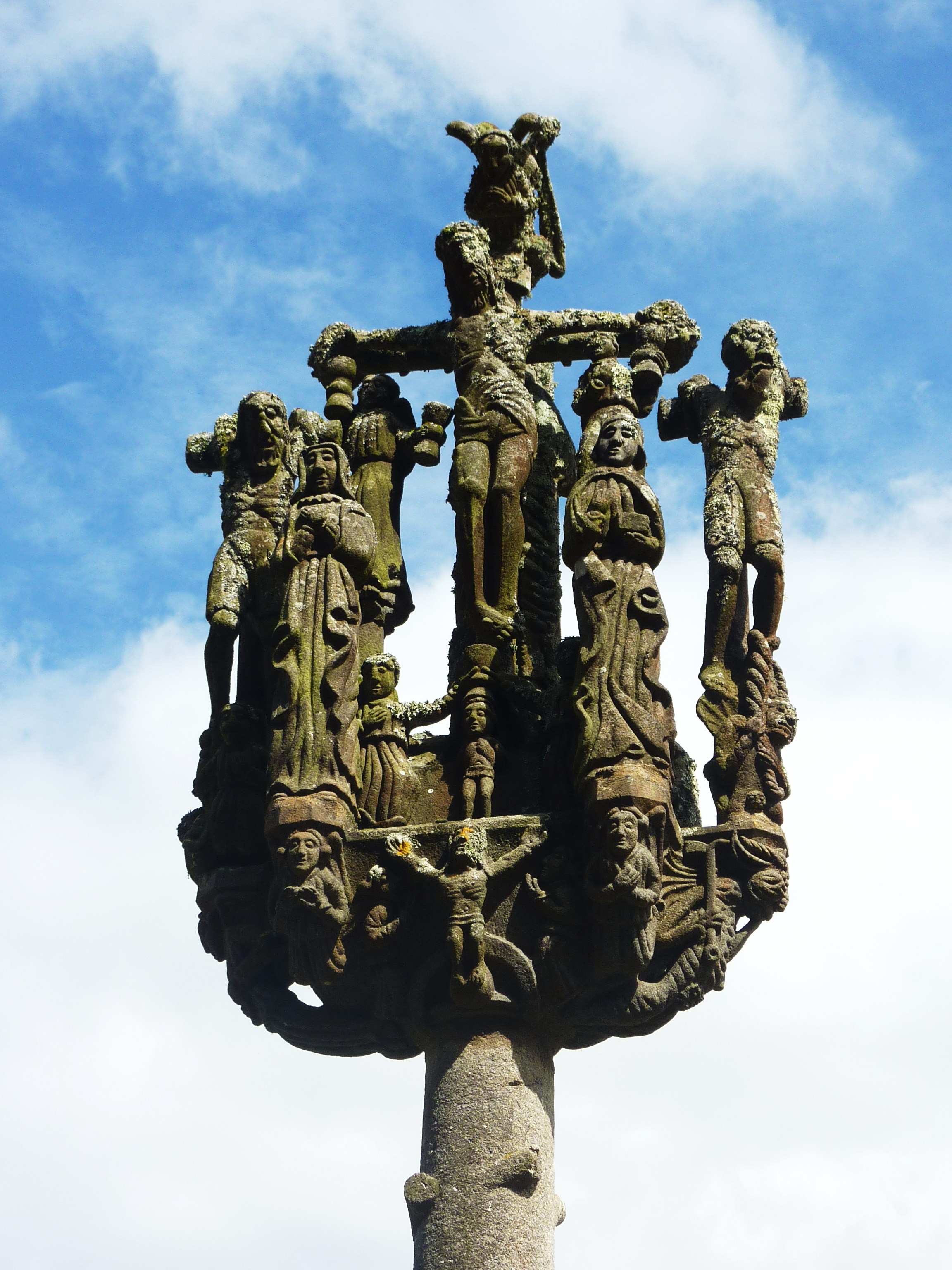
The calvary at Saint-Herbot chapel viewed from the western side

Above the crucified Jesus we see a small angel who will carry off his soul and other angels collecting the blood from his wounds including those in his side. We see the Virgin Mary and John the Evangelist's statues and the two robbers on their crosses. At the foot of the crucifixion cross, two angels stand placing a chalice on the head on a small figure. This figure is thought to represent Adam added to represent the human race and being the first to benefit from the shedding of Jesus' blood. Below is the resurrected Christ. We can see the wounds on his hands. On either side of him are angels and another two winged angels are seen below the figures of the Virgin Mary and Saint John. Beneath the "good" robber is another angel whilst beneath the "bad robber" is a demonic figure who has the head of another demon between his legs.

== The Calvary from the eastern side ==
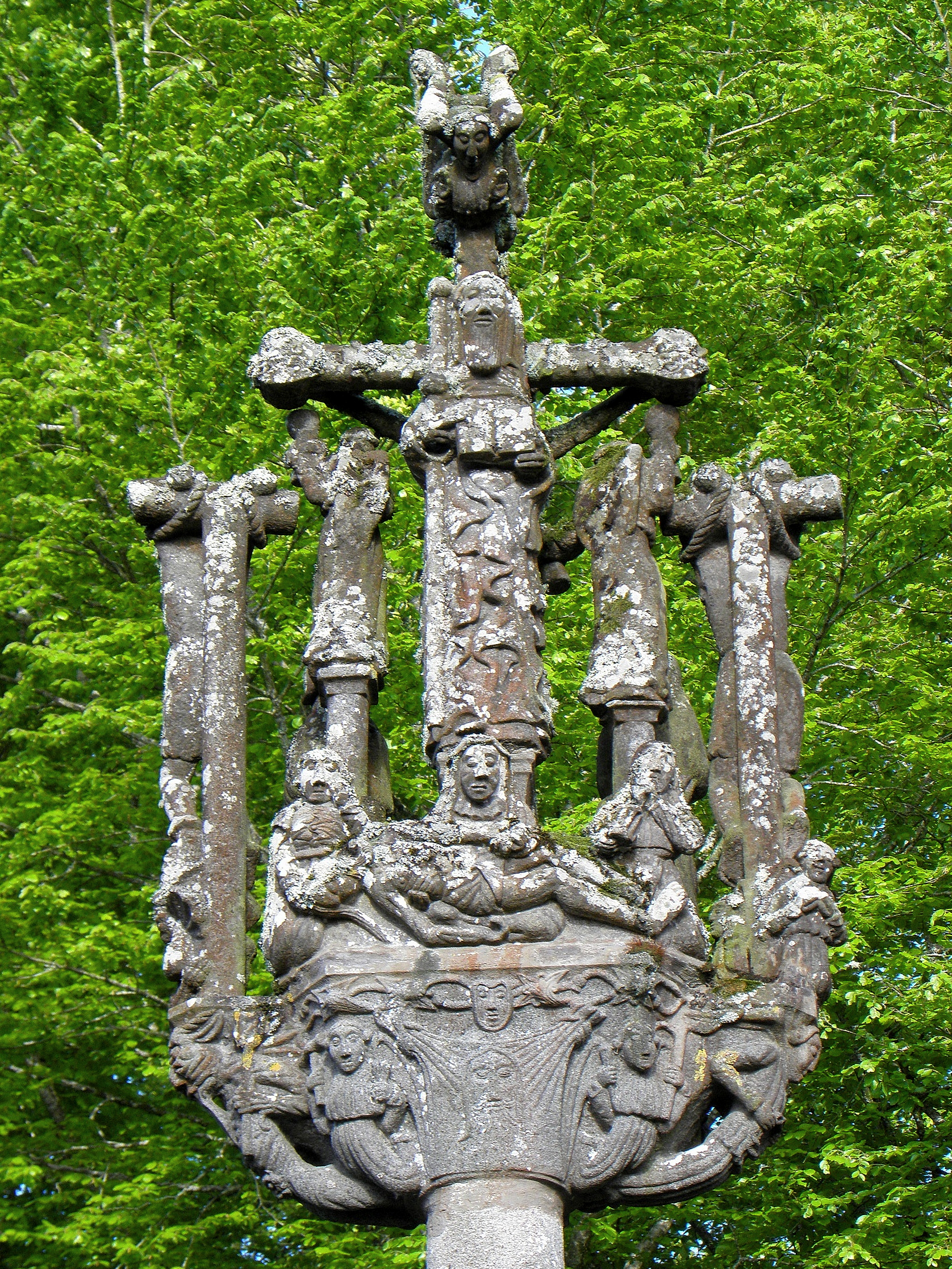
The Calvary from the eastern side

The reverse or eastern side of the Calvary has a depiction of Saint Herbot on the central cross. He holds an open book and a pastoral staff. Beneath Saint Herbot is a pietà and above him is an angel, her hands spread open. Below the pietà is St Veronica between two angels. She wears a nun's whimple and is holding her veil bearing the image of Jesus' face. The angels hold some of the instruments of the Passion. One holds a hammer and the other a whip. Both hold nails. The Virgin Mary has one hand on the place where Jesus' side had been pierced by a lance during the crucifixion and bizarrely an animal, possibly a dog, appears to be licking Jesus' hand. The Virgin Mary has John the Evangelist on one side and Mary Magdalene on the other.

== The south porch ==
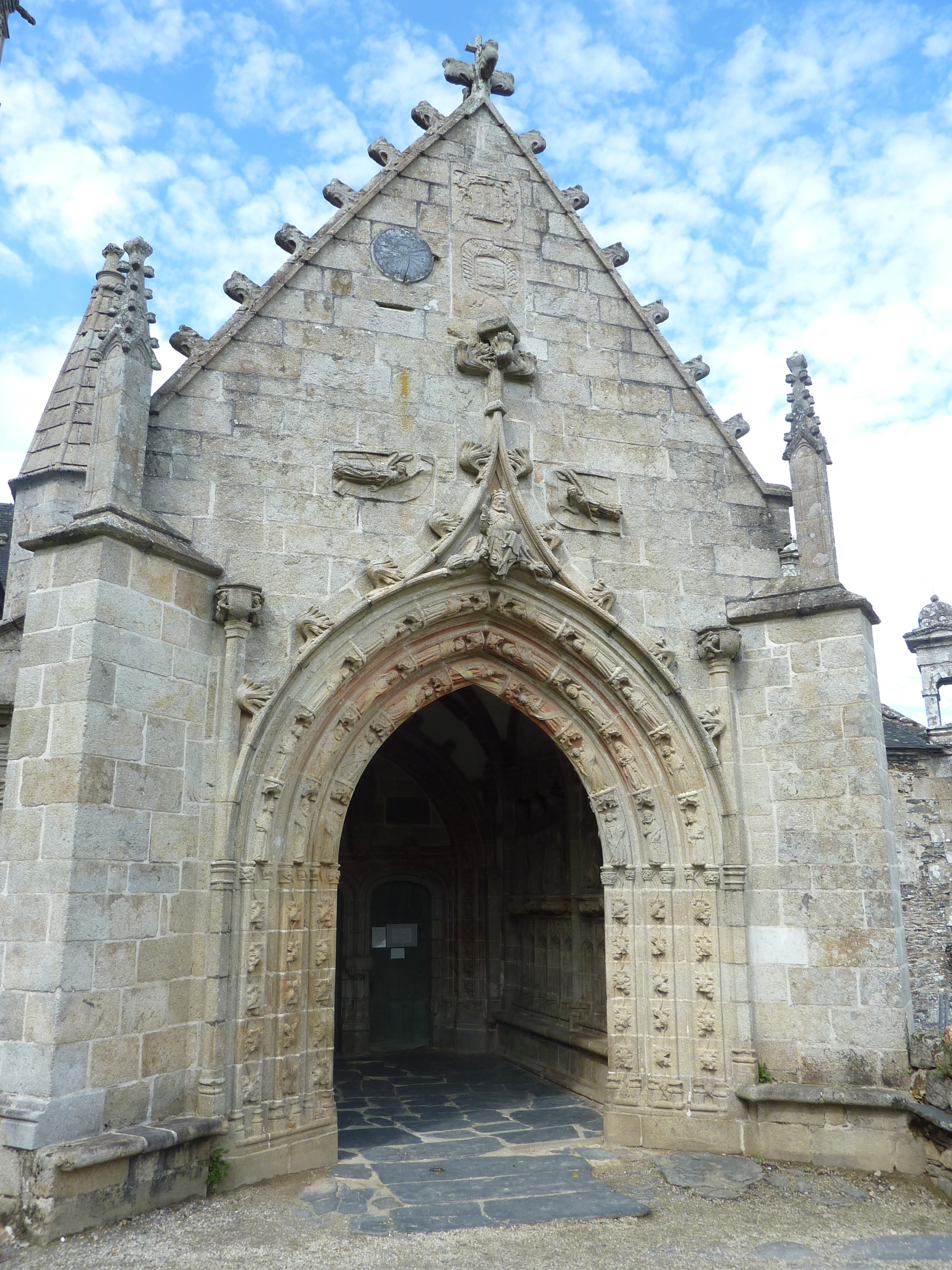
View of the south porch. Above the porch entrance voussoirs feature angels and the prophets including John the Baptist

The arched porch, added between 1498 and 1509, is decorated with voussures depicting angels and saints. There are three voussoirs on the porch's entrance and two on the inner door leading into the chapel. Above the porch entrance is a sculpture depicting the Holy Father who is giving a blessing with his right hand and holding a terrestrial globe in his left hand. Two small angels are placed on either side of him. Then on each side of the entrance are sculptures of two further angels. They appear to be floating in the air. There are in fact twenty-six angels and sixteen saints depicted in the voussoirs. John the Baptist is one of the saints depicted. He carries a lamb in his arms and is dressed in an animal skin. Inside the porch are twelve statues depicting the apostles, each placed in elaborately decorated gothic niches. Each apostle wears a banderole on which is written the part of the credo associated with them. These statues lead to the entrance door to the church and over this door is a sculpture depicting Saint Herbot, inscribed with the date "1581". He carries an open book thus introducing the theme of evangelism, a theme repeated throughout the chapel.

== Gallery of images relating to the south porch ==
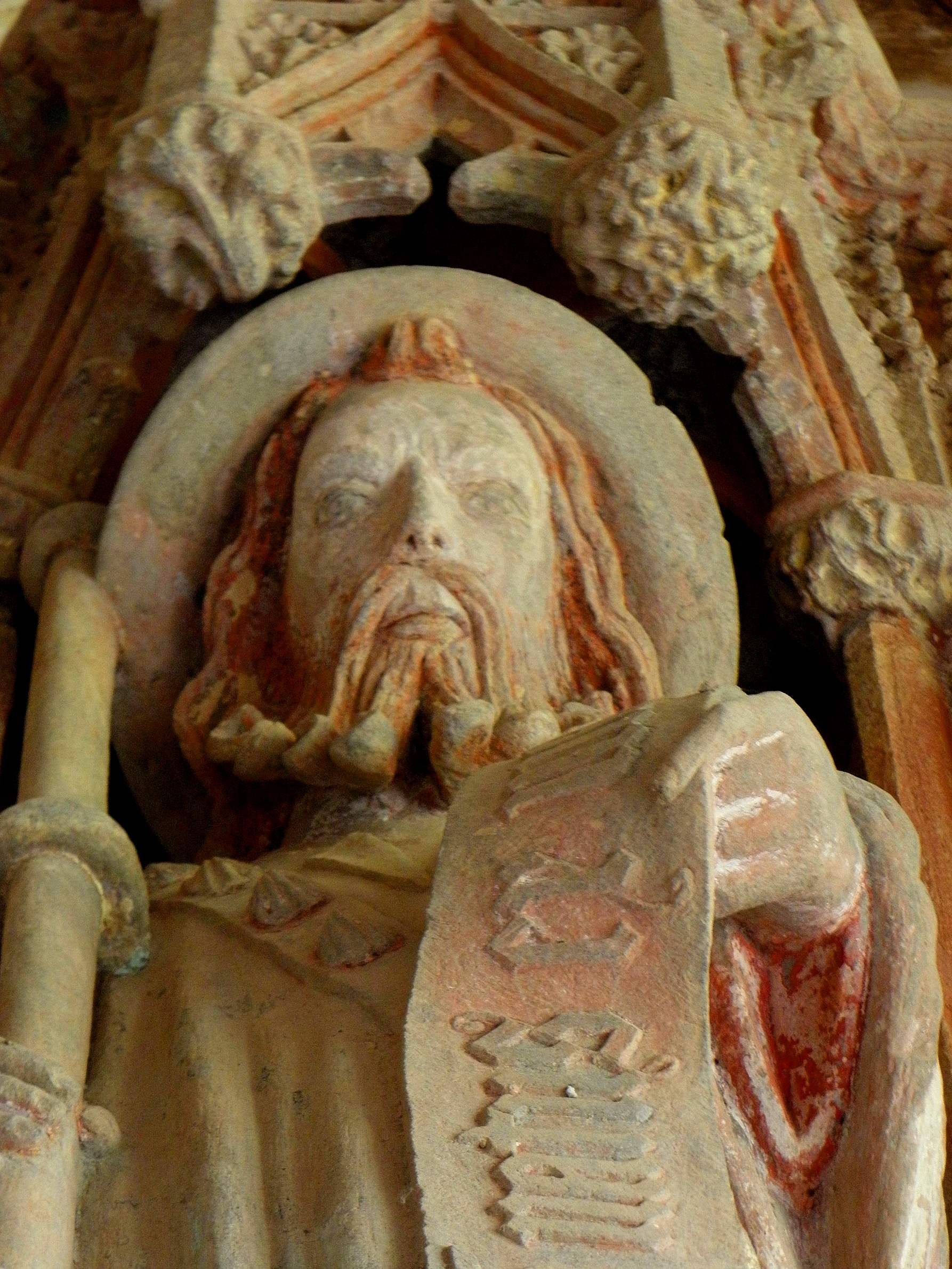
The interior of the south porch. A close-up of one of the statues of the apostles

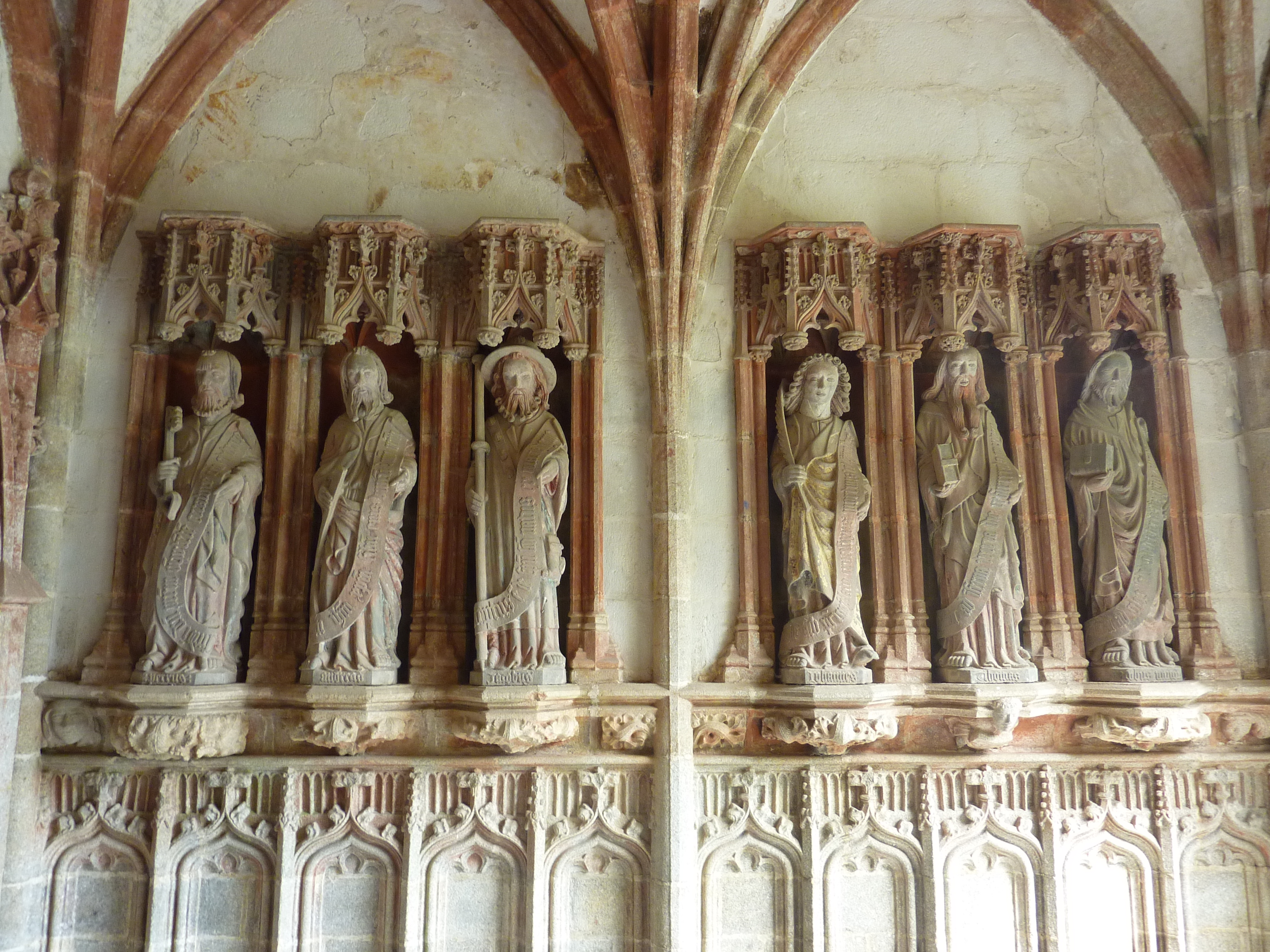
The six sculptures of apostles on the east side of the porch interior. They are, from left to right, Saints Peter, Andrew, James the Greater, John, Thomas and James the Lesser.

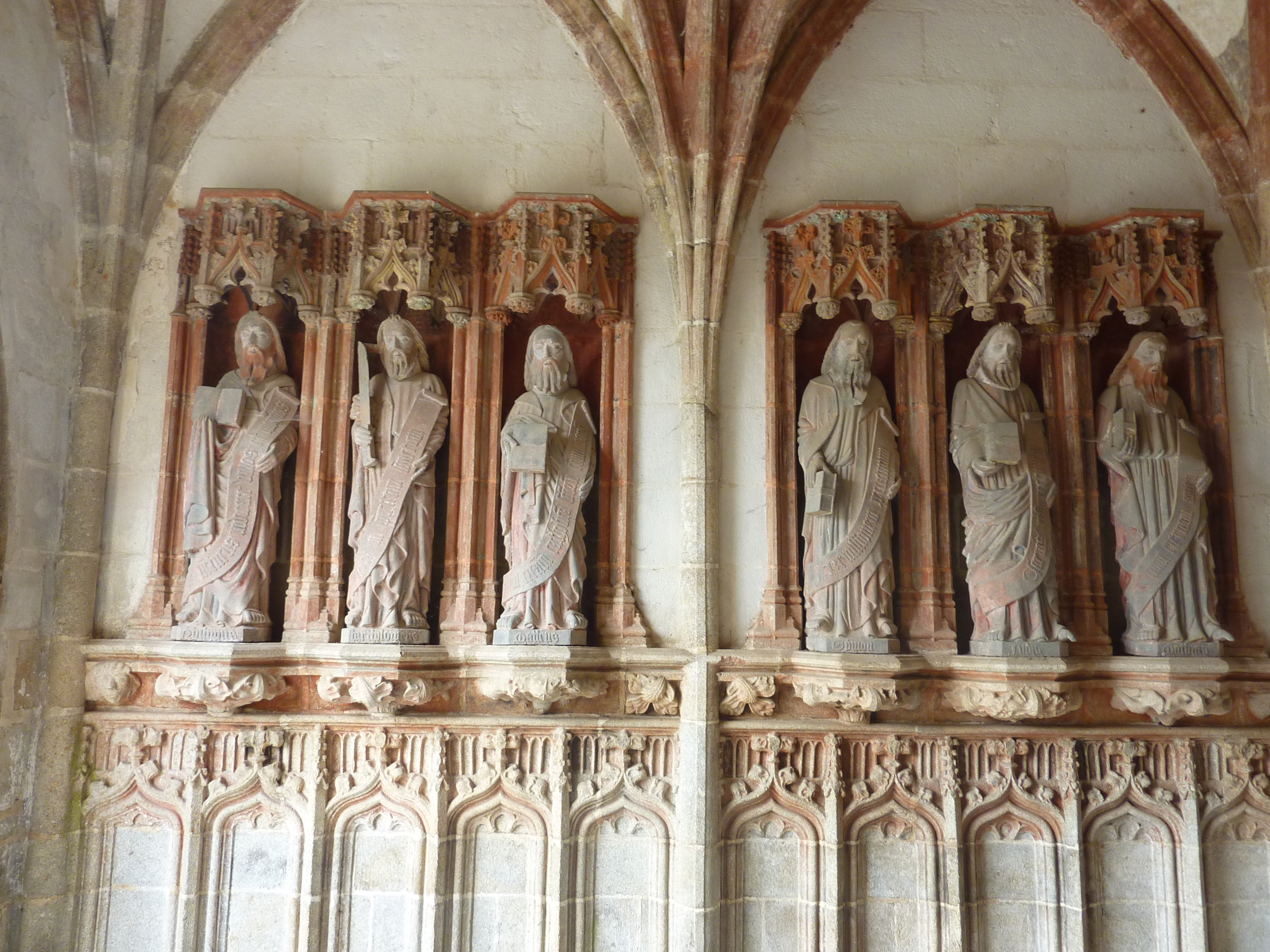
The six sculptures of apostles on the west side of the porch interior. They are, from left to right, Saints Phillip, Bartholomew, Matthew, Simon, Judas and Mathias.

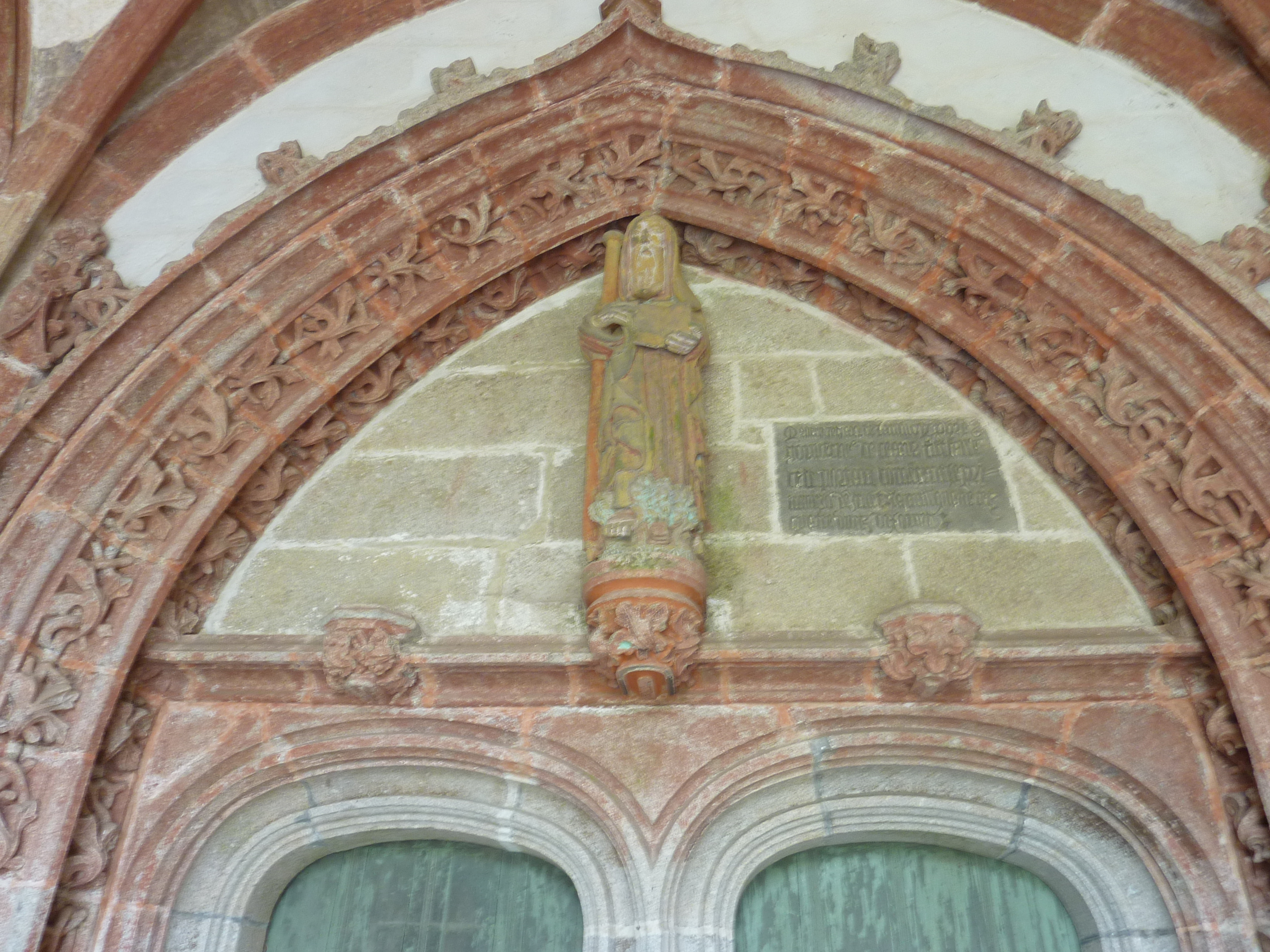
The entrance door to the church via the south porch. Over the door is a depiction of Saint Herbot with the inscription "MESSIRE IEHAN DE LAVLNAY P[RE]B[T]RE GOUVERNEUR DE CEANS FIST FAIRE CEST PORTAL COMENCE(ME)NT LE PREMIER IOVR DE IVIET LAN MIL QVATRE CE[N]TS QVATRE VINTS DIX OVIT"

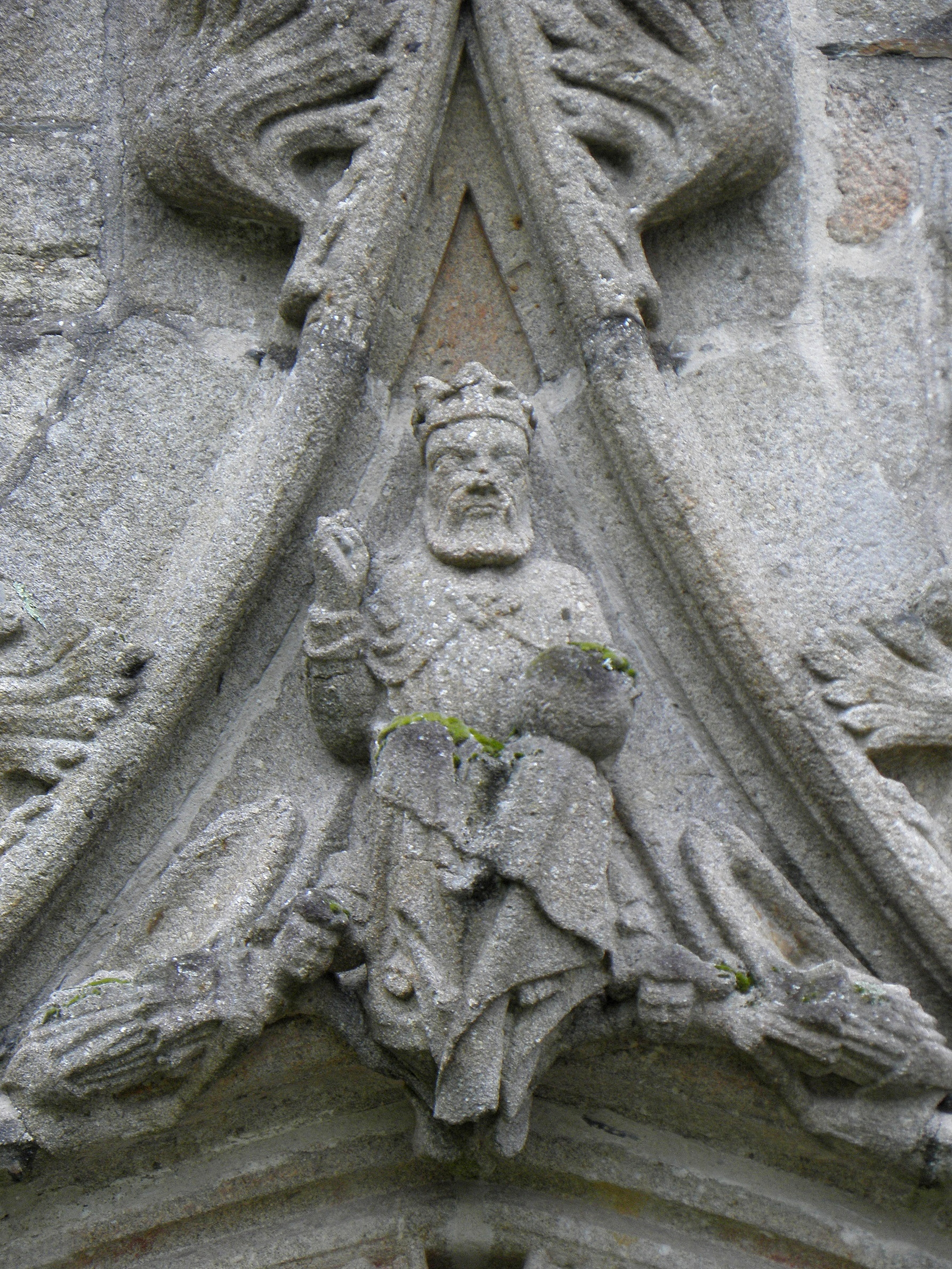
The small statue depicting the Holy Father over the entrance to the south porch. He is giving a blessing and holds a terrestrial globe.

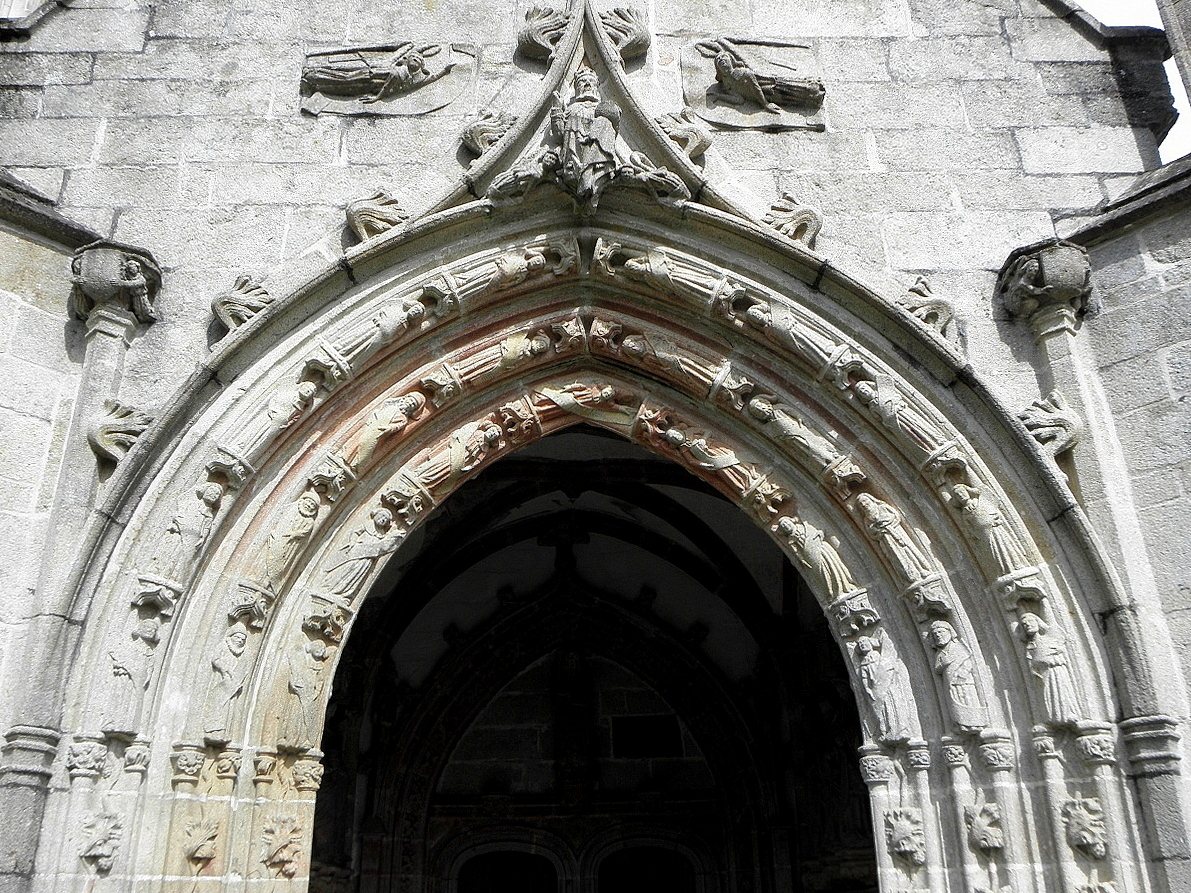
The south porch showing the voussoirs decorated with depictions of the apostles

== Other entrances to the church ==
The arched west double door dates to 1516 and gives access to the nave and the decoration includes a depiction of Saint Herbot surrounded by angels. They wear banderoles inscribed "Benedictus" ("Blessed are those who come in the name of the Lord") and "Laudate" ("Praise be to God"). There is also a depiction of a man carrying his hat in his hand and greeting visitors with the greeting "Pax vobis" ("Peace be with you"). There is another entrance to the church on the north side, this accessed by a stairway built in 1858.

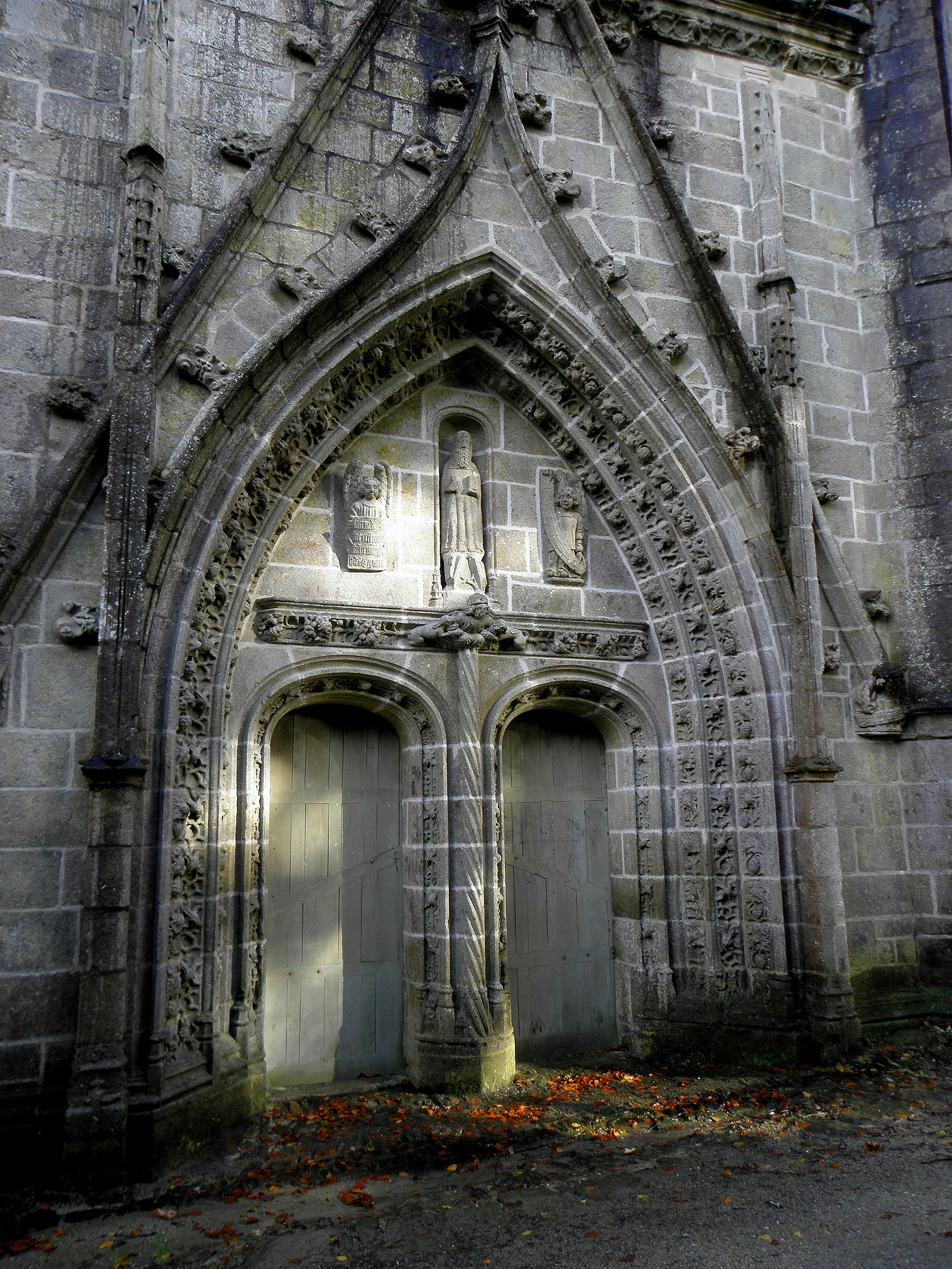
The west façade of the chapel. Saint Herbot is depicted with two angels on either side. The angels carry a banner reading "LAN:M:VC:XVI:/FVT CEST PORTAL/.COMA[N]CE:MESSIR[E]:CHO[RENTIN]:/K[ER]DETFEZ GOVVERNEUR"

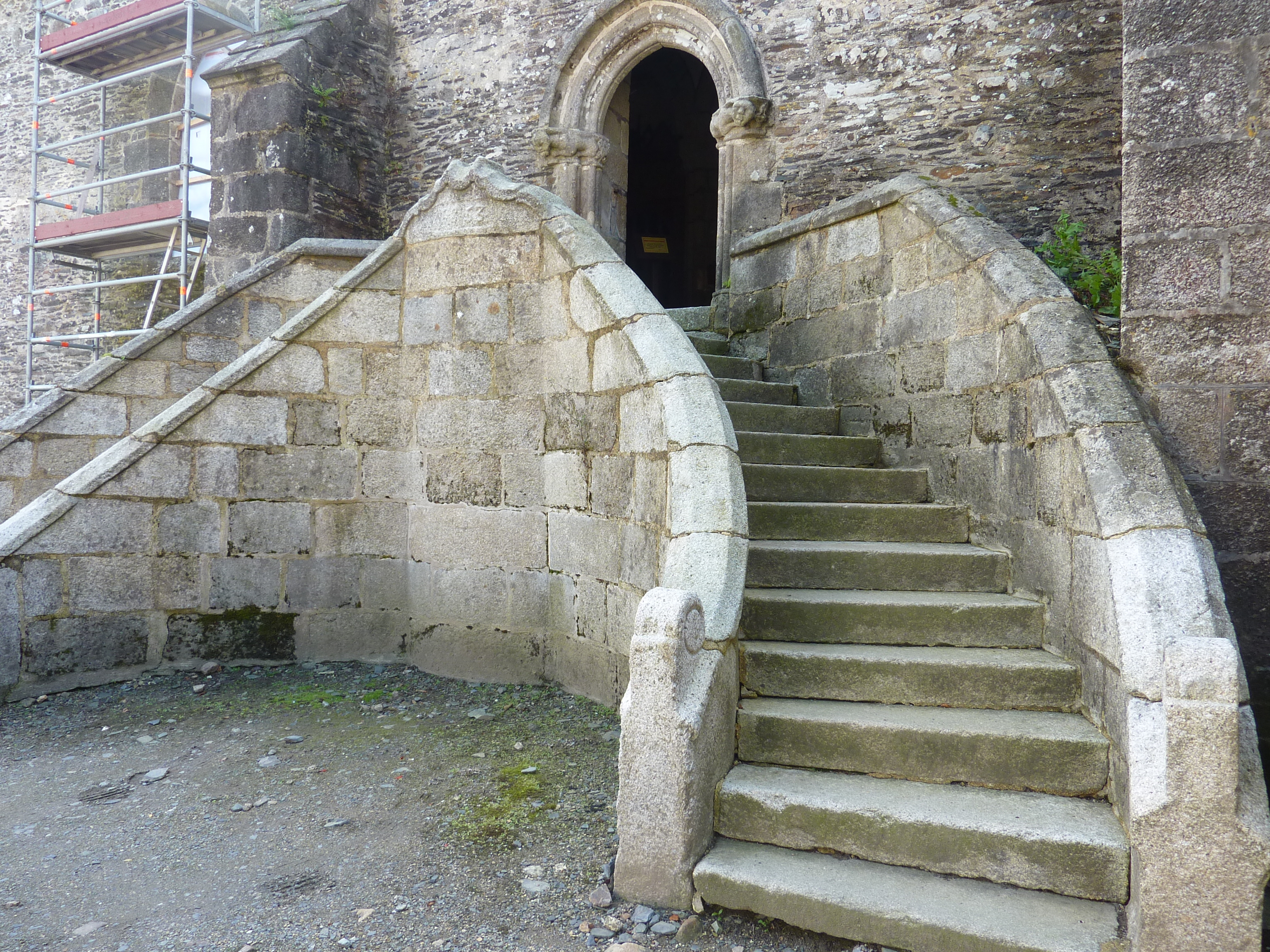
The stairway leading up to the north door

== The chapel interior ==
The interior of the chapel has a remarkable chancel separated from the rest of the church by an oak rood screen ("poutre de gloire") in the Renaissance style and on the top of this screen is a depiction of the crucifixion. The chancel also holds a frieze of panels separated by caryatids representing the twelve Sibyls and the twelve apostles. On either side of the chancel entrance which leads on to the choir are two granite tables on which worshippers could deposit their offerings to Saint Herbot (often tuffs of hair from their cattle). The choir itself has fifteen stalls dating from 1550 to 1570 each with misericords. These misericords have their own unique carvings. The sacristy dates to the 18th century.

== The chancel and rood screen ==
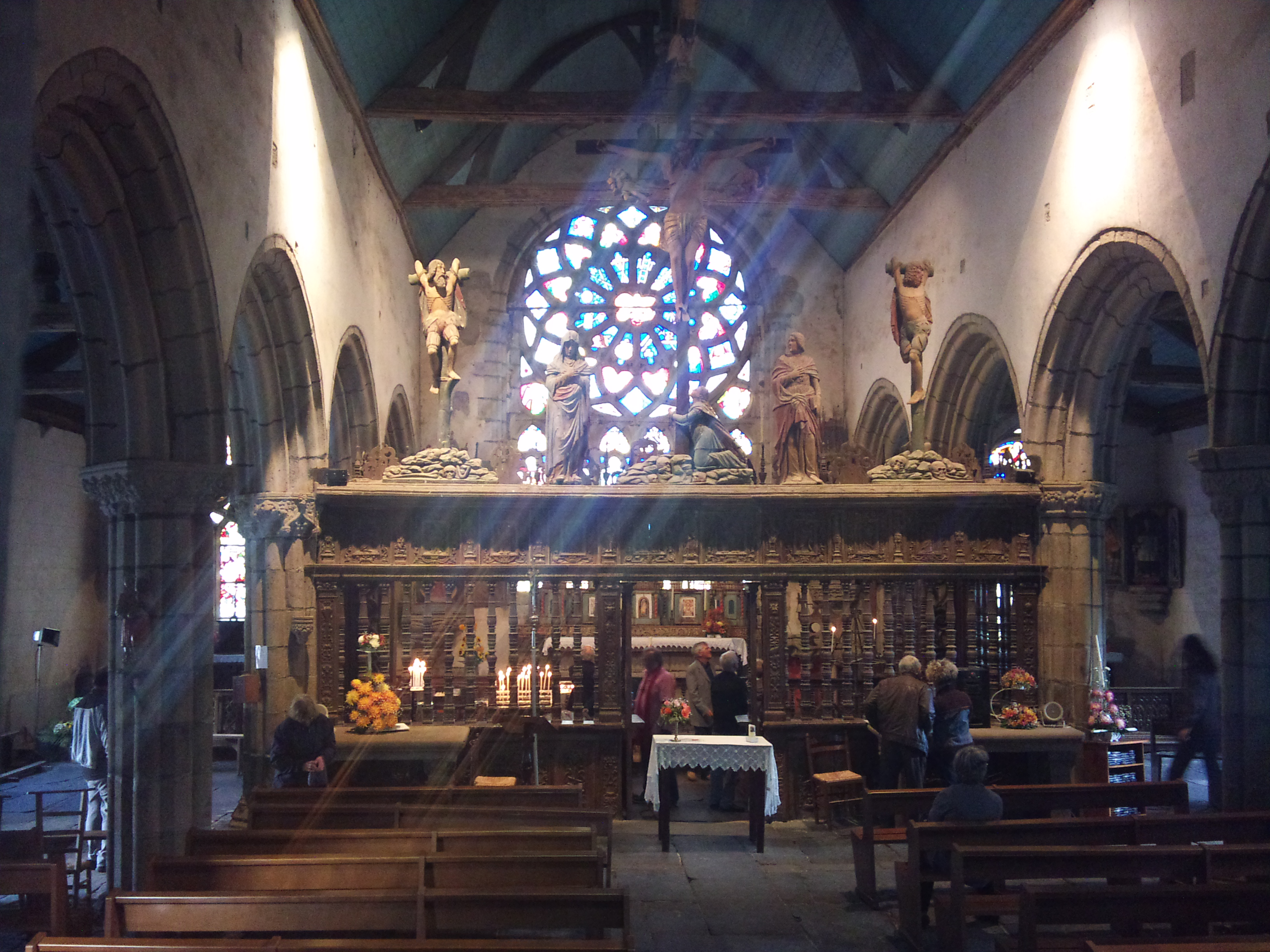
The chancel. The oak rood screen separating the choir from the rest of the church. On the top of the screen is a depiction of the crucifixion

The 16th-century chancel separates the choir from the rest of the church. The space inside the chancel is reserved for the clergy and that outside the chancel for the congregation. On each side of the entrance to the chancel are stone tables on which the congregation could place their offerings. Above the chancel grill is an inscription dating to 1659 with a verse from the Book of Jeremiah reading

" O VOS OMNES QUI TRANSITIS PER VIAM ATTENDITE ET VIDETE SI EST DOLOR SICUT DOLOR MEUS - O VOUS TOUS PASSANTS ARRESTEZ-VOUS ET VOYEZ S'IL EST UNE DOULEUR SEMBLABLE A LA MIENNE"

There is a decorated frieze on the outside of the choir and on the part of the frieze looking on to the nave are panels depicting the apostles presided over by Saint Herbot holding a baton and a book. The panels, from left to right, start with a depiction of St Peter with key, Andrew the Apostle and his cross, John the Evangelist with a chalice, and James the Greater with a hat and a stick. The two panels over the chancel entrance are larger than the others and in between them is a depiction of Saint Herbot on a dais. These larger panels hold two images, the first of Thomas the Apostle with a set-square and Philip the Apostle with a Latin cross and the second Bartholomew the Apostle with a knife and Matthew the Evangelist with a lance. The last four panels depict James the Lesser with a St Laurent's stick, Simon the Apostle with a saw, Matthew the Evangelist with a book and halberd and Judas Iscariot with an épée. Further panels include images of people playing the harp and viola or holding an anchor and another crossing water. On top of the rood screen is a depiction of the crucifixion. Jesus Christ is surrounded by the Virgin Mary and John the Evangelist and below them are heaps of bones scattered on the ground to remind us of Golgotha. Mary Magdalene is shown kneeling, her arms around the base of the cross. Two angels are shown collecting the blood from Jesus' wounds. The good robber hangs from his cross looking towards Jesus whilst the bad robber is turning his head away. A pelican is added to the composition to remind the congregation that Jesus was sacrificed to save the human race. There are 15 oak stalls around the chancel. Each is decorated and has a misericord. They date from between 1550 and 1570.

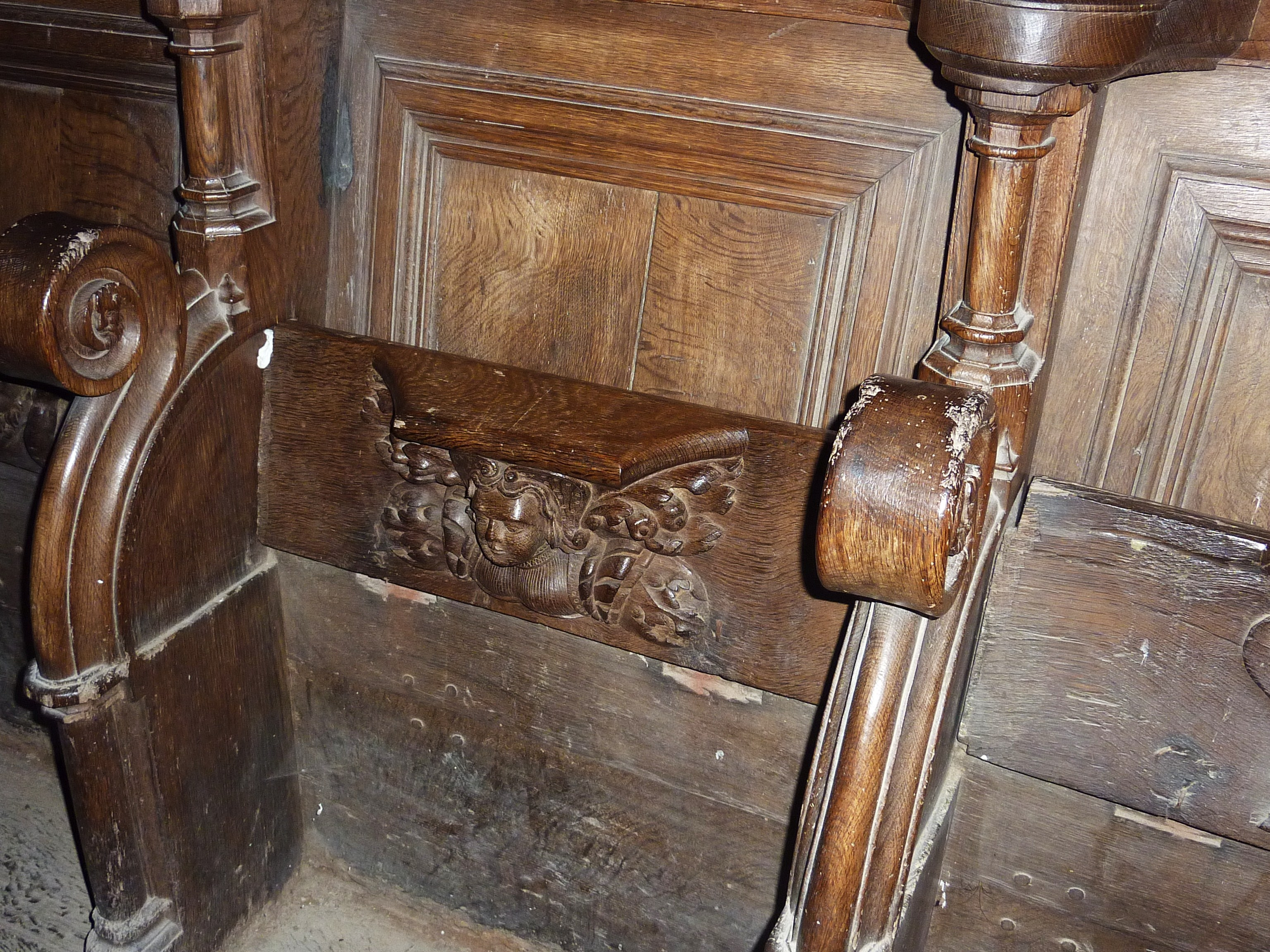
One of the fifteen stalls in the St Herbot chapel

== Stained glass ==
The choir window and the window dedicated to St Yves both date to 1556 and are attributed to the Morlaix workshop of Thomas Quéméner. The choir window includes the coats of arms of many local families and dignitaries. The windows were restored in 1716 by Claude Le Roux and in 1886 by Huchet et fils of Le Mans. The lateral windows honour St Yves and St Laurent.

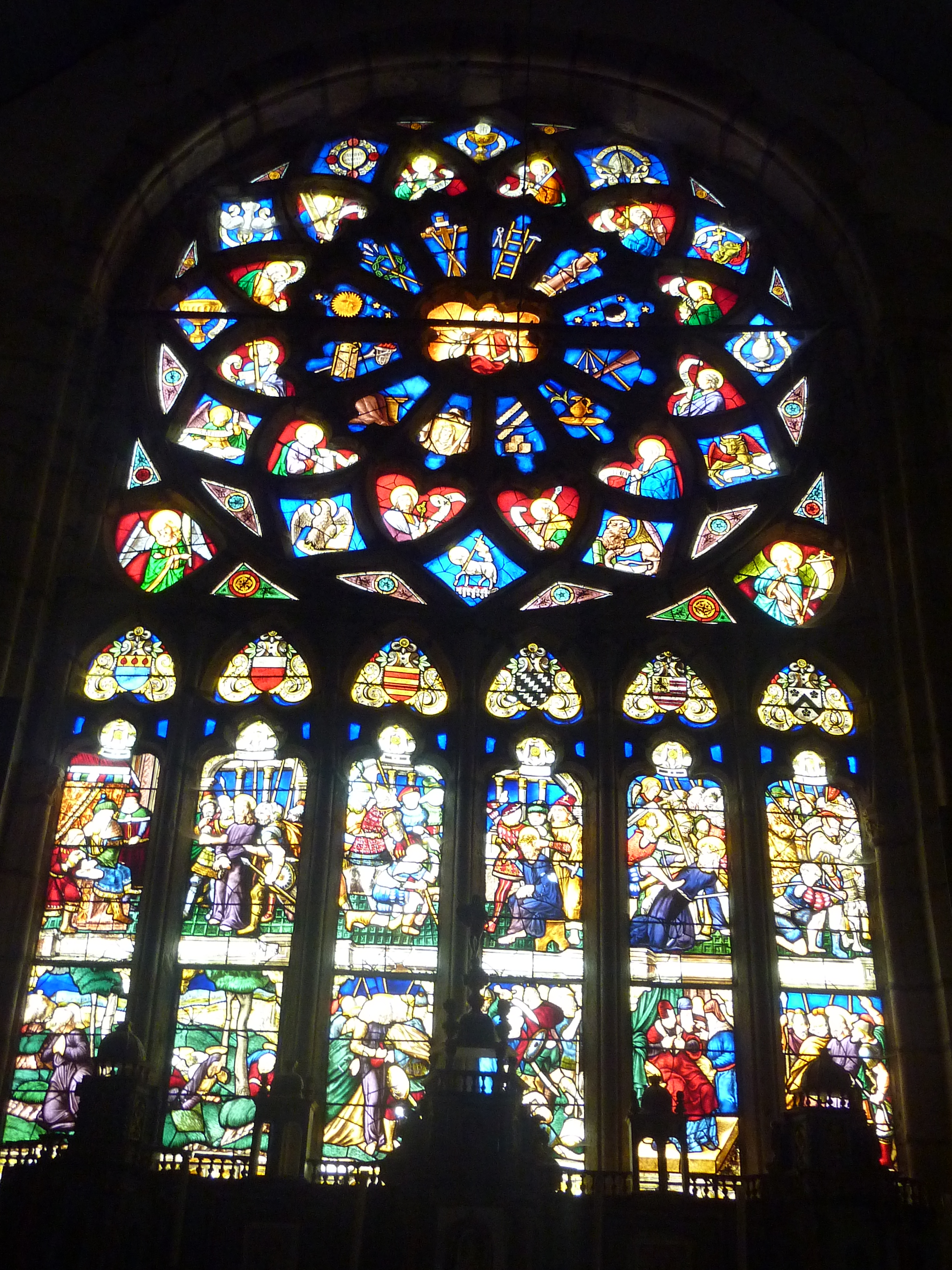
The choir window behind the main altar

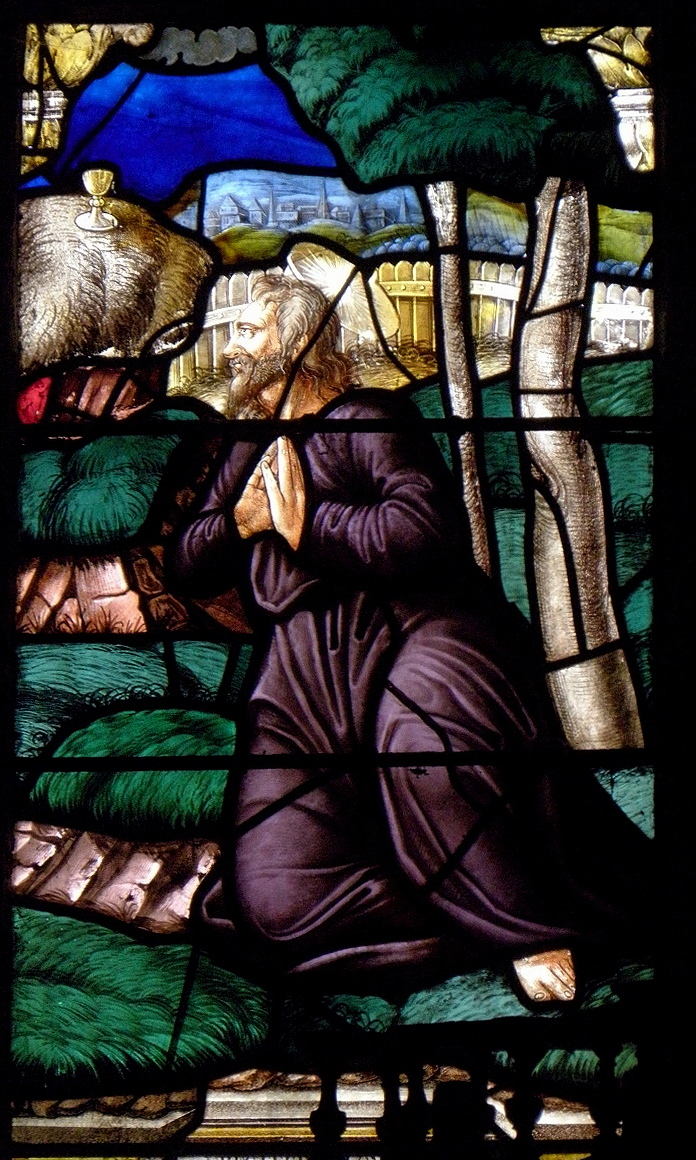
Jesus praying in the garden of Gethsemane. Part of the choir window

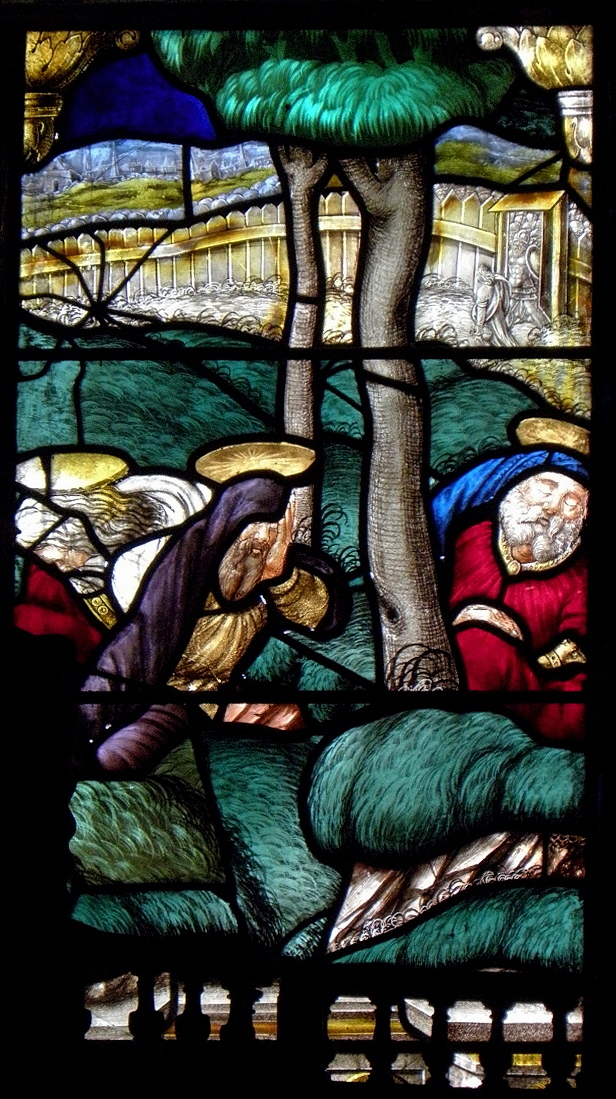
Whilst Jesus was praying the apostles who were with him have fallen asleep. Part of the choir window
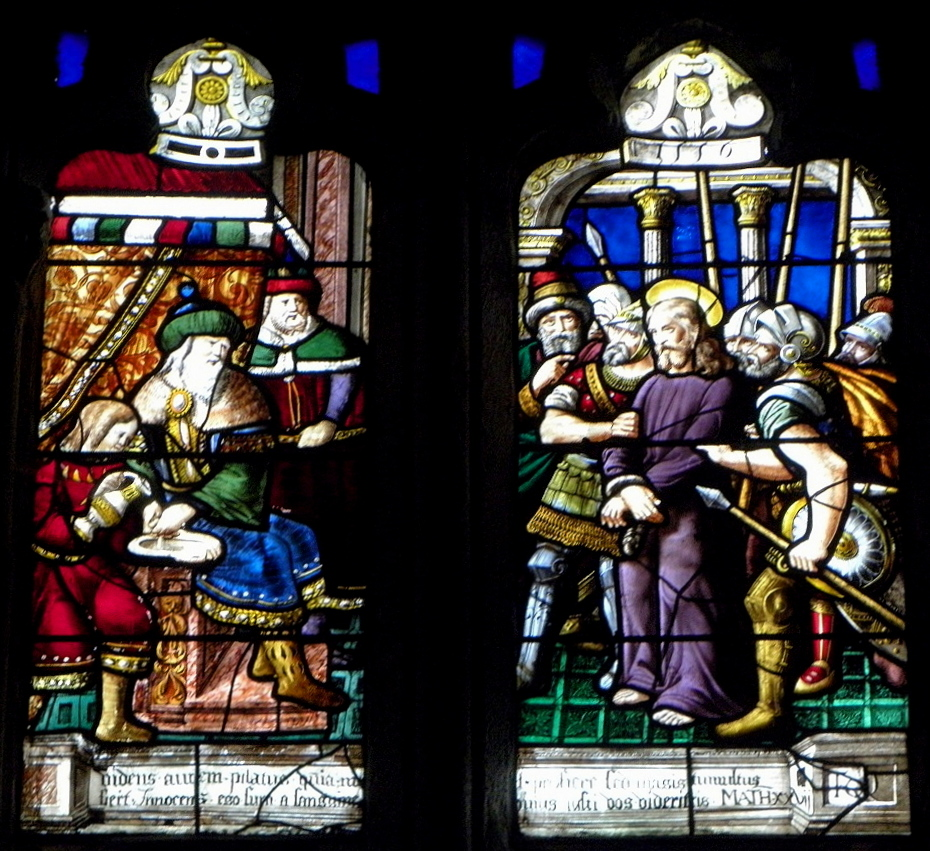
Part of the St Herbot chapel main window. Jesus is taken before Pontius Pilate

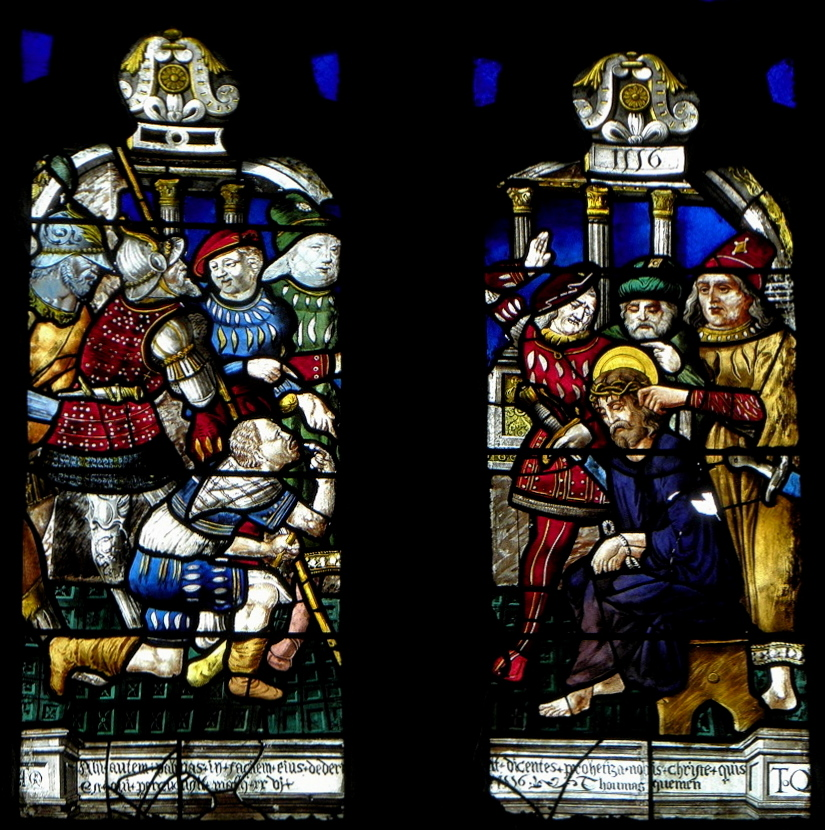
In these two lights the first showed Jesus being mocked and then having the crown of thorns pressed on his head.

The so-called "window of the Passion", dating to 1556, is a mullioned rose window with Christ depicted in the centre wearing a "royal" robe. The inner circle of the window has panels with depictions of the various instruments associated with the Passion whilst in the second circle there are depictions of the twelve apostles and the four evangelists. Further circles include the coats of arms of various local families, the Du Rusquecs, the De Rosilys, the marshal of Bodriec, De Kerlech du Chatel, the Le Forestiers and the de Berriens. There are five lancets below the rose window.

== The gisant of Saint Herbot ==
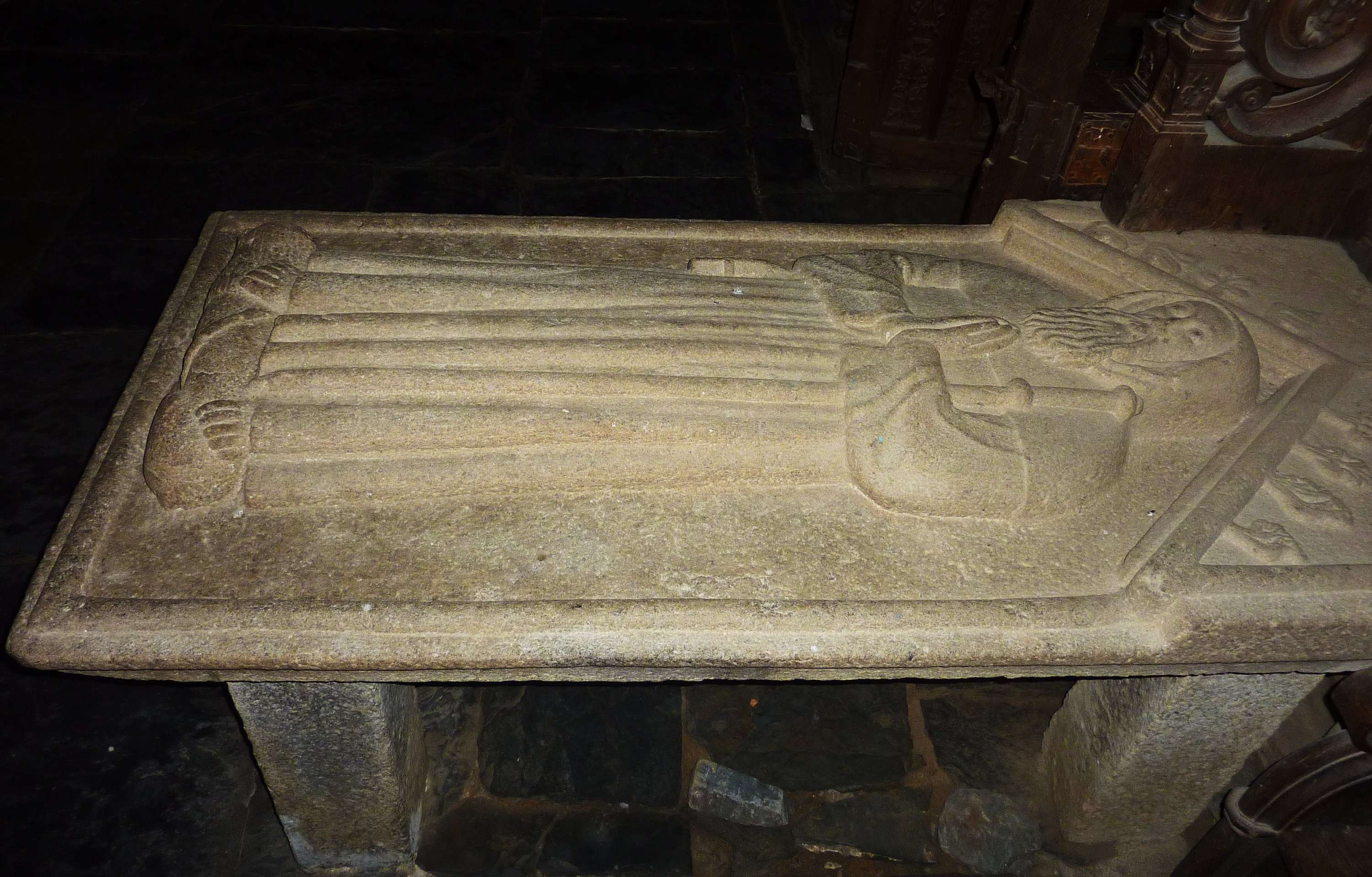
The gisant of Saint Herbot

This gisant is a granite effigy that depicts Saint Herbot in relief, dressed in a long robe and an aventail or camail. There is a pilgrim's staff beneath his left arm and by his right arm is a pouch and a book.

== See also ==
- Culture of France
- French architecture
- History of France
- List of the works of the Maître de Guimiliau
- Religion in France
- Roman Catholicism in France

== Notes ==
Note 1: Saint Herbot, born in Great Britain, was the patron saint of cattle and those who traded in milk products. According to legend, he owned two white cows who had supernatural strength and enabled him to work at a miraculous rate. When he died he left the two cows to the local farm workers on condition that every evening they brought them to his tomb. The workers failed to follow his instruction and the two cows disappeared! On the day set aside for the "pardon", the Wednesday before Trinity Sunday, the faithful leave on the church altar, milk, butter and even tuffs of hair cut from cattle to secure Saint Herbot's favour.
