= Huelgoat =

Huelgoat An Uhelgoad
- Commune
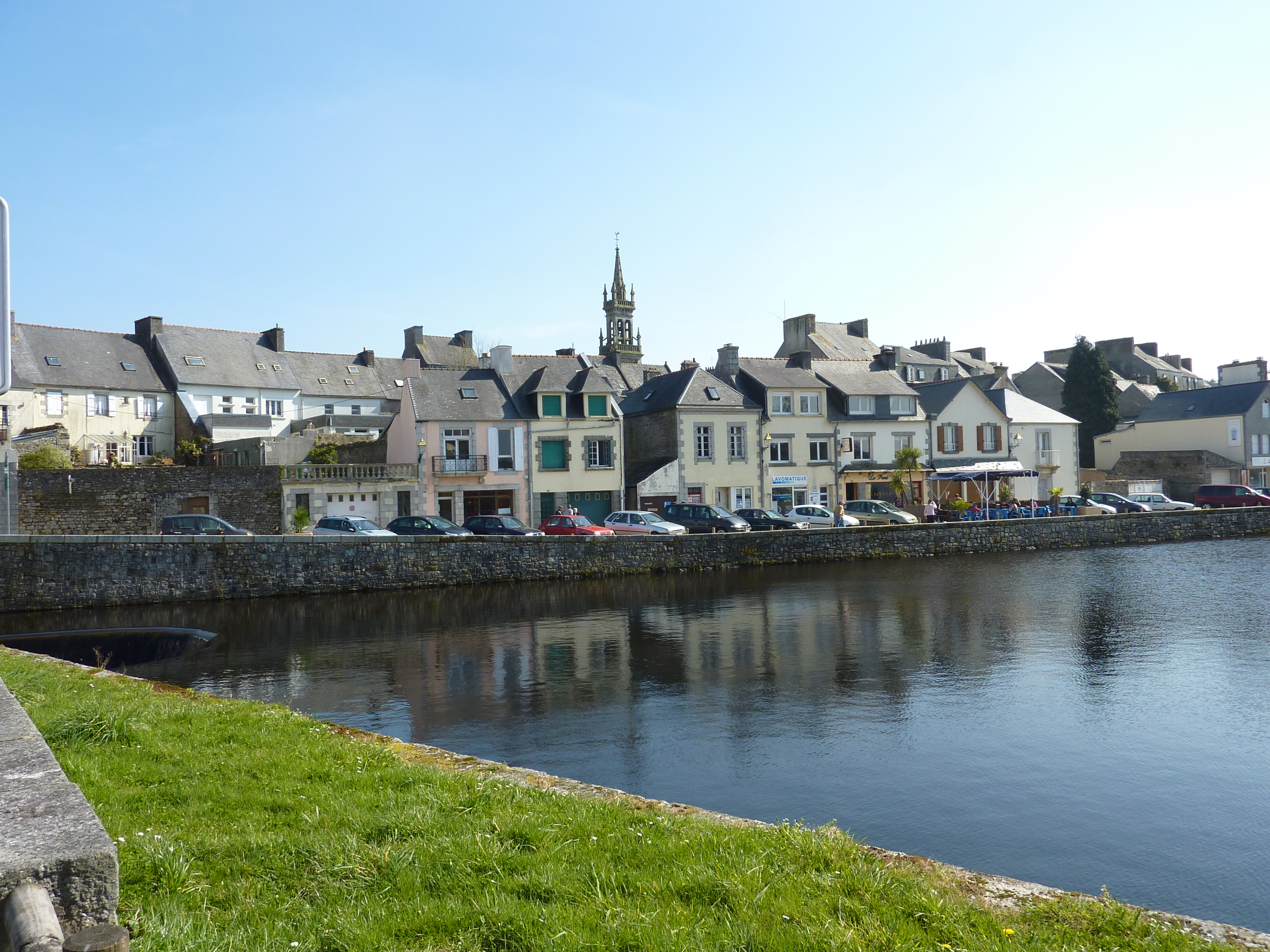
- The city seen from the lake

- Flag Coat of arms
- Location of Huelgoat
- Location within France Location within Brittany
- Coordinates: 48°21′54″N 3°44′37″W
- Country: France
- Region: Brittany
- Department: Finistère
- Arrondissement: Châteaulin
- Canton: Carhaix-Plouguer
- Intercommunality: Monts d'Arrée

Government
  - Mayor (2021–2026): Jacques Thepaut
- Area^{1}: 14.87 km^{2} (5.74 sq mi)
- Highest elevation: 267 m (876 ft)
- Lowest elevation: 92 m (302 ft)
- Population (2023): 1,440
  - Density: 96.8/km^{2} (251/sq mi)
- Time zone: UTC+01:00 (CET)
  - Summer (DST): UTC+02:00 (CEST)
- INSEE/Postal code: 29081 /29690
- ^{1} French Land Register data, which excludes lakes, ponds, glaciers > 1 km^{2} (0.386 sq mi or 247 acres) and river estuaries.

Huelgoat (French pronunciation: [ɥɛlgwat]; Breton: An Uhelgoad meaning "High Forest") is a commune in the Finistère department of Brittany in northwestern France.

== Population ==
Inhabitants of Huelgoat are called in French Huelgoatains.

Historical population

Year	Pop.	±% p.a.
1793	977	—
1800	898	−1.20%
1806	900	+0.04%
1821	929	+0.21%
1831	1,037	+1.11%
1836	1,171	+2.46%
1841	1,156	−0.26%
1846	1,200	+0.75%
1851	1,215	+0.25%
1856	1,176	−0.65%
1861	1,203	+0.46%
1866	1,277	+1.20%
1872	1,240	−0.49%
1876	1,327	+1.71%
1881	1,184	−2.25%
1886	1,401	+3.42%
1891	1,324	−1.12%
1896	1,413	+1.31%
1901	1,600	+2.52%

Year	Pop.	±% p.a.
1906	1,874	+3.21%
1911	2,134	+2.63%
1921	1,996	−0.67%
1926	2,207	+2.03%
1931	2,331	+1.10%
1936	2,283	−0.42%
1946	2,431	+0.63%
1954	2,363	−0.35%
1962	2,057	−1.72%
1968	2,456	+3.00%
1975	2,230	−1.37%
1982	2,026	−1.36%
1990	1,742	−1.87%
1999	1,687	−0.36%
2007	1,612	−0.57%
2012	1,574	−0.48%
2017	1,449	−1.64%
2023	1,440	−0.10%

Source: EHESS and INSEE (1968-2023)

== Geography ==
Huelgoat is popular with tourists and holidaymakers due to its impressive natural setting among the vestiges of the ancient forest that once covered inland Brittany. Once part of royal and ducal lands, the forest is now overseen by the French forestry commission, the National Forests Office. It has an area of 10 square kilometres. A large replanting scheme has repaired much of the damage sustained by the forest in storms on the 15–16 October 1987, when 3.1 square kilometres of trees were levelled or damaged.

The village lies on a lake created between the 16th and 18th centuries to supply water to local silver-lead mines by means of a 3 km (1.9 mi) leat or canal.

== Sights ==
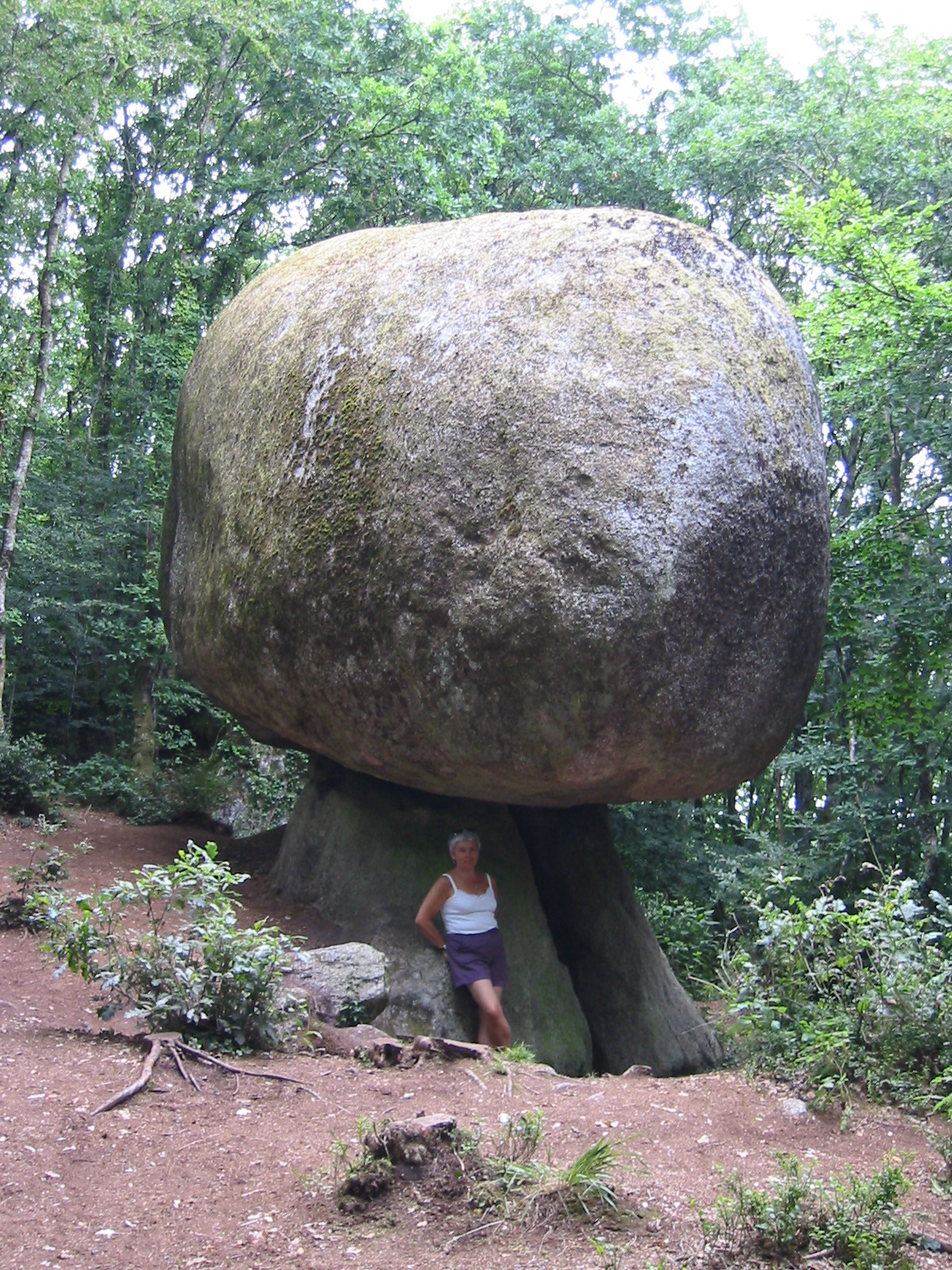
Le Champignon rock, Huelgoat

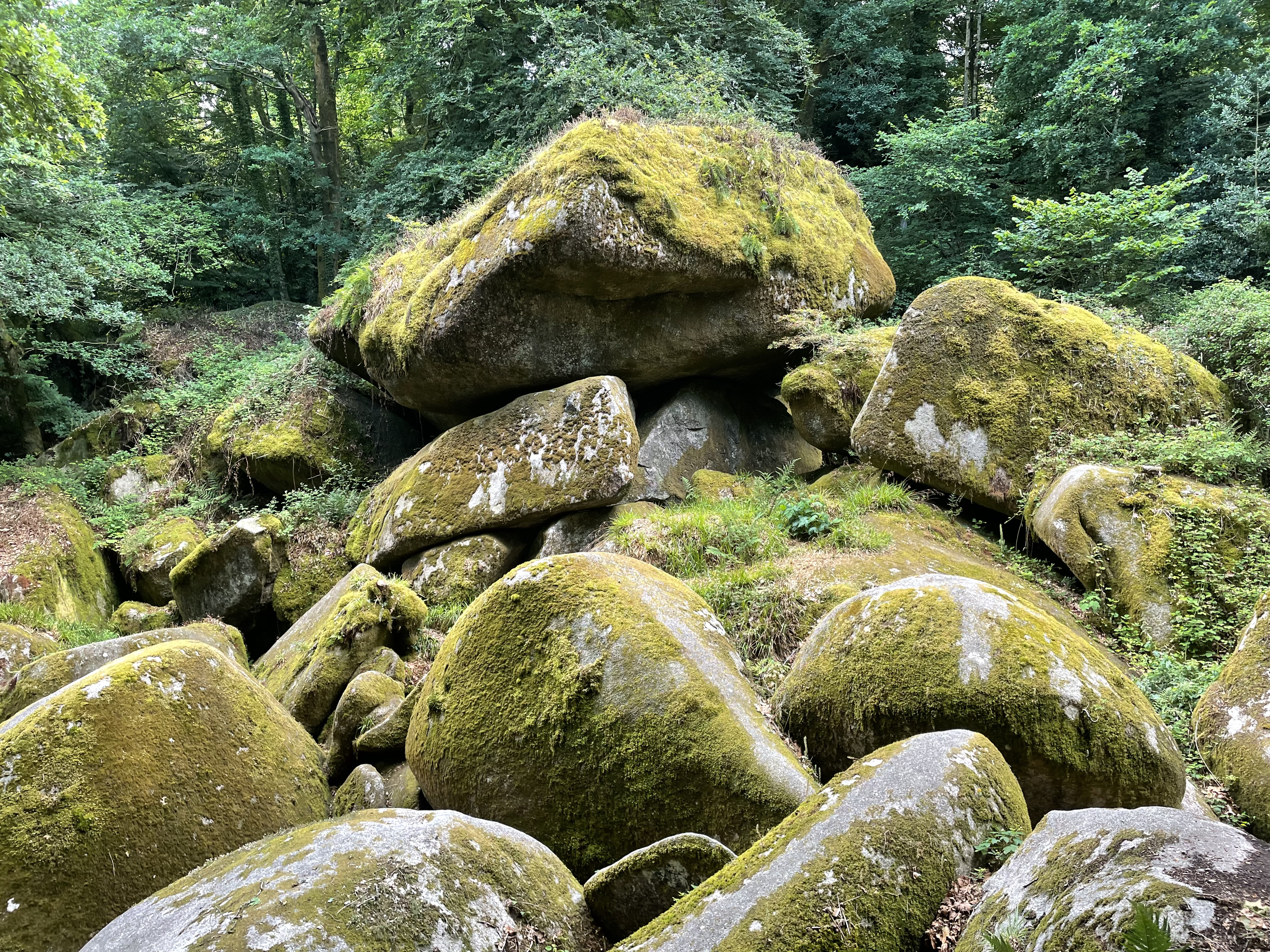
Le chaos de rochers, Huelgoat

A number of geological and prehistoric curiosities can be found by following trails in and around the village and forest. Among these are:

- Le Chaos de Rochers, the Chaos of Rocks, is a jumble of hundreds of large boulders below the dammed lake, into which the river vanishes. A 10 m descent down ladders is required to see it again, running rapidly below a dark cave called the Devil's Grotto.
- La Roche Tremblante or Trembling Rock, is a 137-tonne rocking boulder, pivoted so it can be made to rock by a person pushing against one point.
- Le Champignon, or The Mushroom, is a large rock balanced on a smaller one to give the eponymous appearance.
- La Mare aux Fées, the fairies' pool.
- La Mare aux Sangliers, the wild boar pool.
- Le Camp d'Artus, Arthur's Camp, a sea promontory hillfort based on a Gaulish oppidum, with a linear murus gallicus rampart. It was used as refuge by the Osismii Gauls against the Roman invasion in 57 BC and later acquired a nickname referring to Arthurian legend. The site was excavated by Sir Mortimer Wheeler.
- La Grotte d'Artus, or Arthur's Cave, is a natural shelter formed under a roof of jammed rocks.

The Poërop Arboretum is a local arboretum with a nationally recognized collection of maple trees, among other substantial collections.

== See also ==
- Communes of the Finistère department
- Parc naturel régional d'Armorique
- Calvary at Saint-Herbot near Plonévez-du-Faou and the Chapelle Saint-Herbot.
