= Poërop Arboretum =

Arboretum in Huelgoat, Finistère, Brittany, France

Coordinates: 48.357°N 3.740°W

The Poërop Arboretum (French Arboretum du Poërop) is a 22-hectare arboretum located in Huelgoat, Finistère, Brittany, France.

The garden's initial site was acquired in 1967 by a local retirement home, with the aim of creating a farm. In 1993 its first arboretum specimens were planted with residents' help, and in 1999 the site expanded by seven hectares. In 2001 its maple collection received a national commendation, and in 2004 the garden opened its Himalayan valley and collections of medicinal plants from Nepal and Yunnan.

Today, the arboretum contains about 3,600 types of trees and shrubs from five continents. Andean and Himalayan plants are strongly represented, primarily by specimens grown from seeds collected in situ. The garden contains good collections of maple (150 varieties), oak (170), pine (100), rhododendron (230), magnolia (160), and roses (200). It also contains about 100 bamboos from Asia, the Americas, and Africa, as well as a forest of eucalyptus and other trees from Australia. Its ethnobotanical garden contains sixteen beds of medicinal plants from the Himalayas.

== See also ==
- List of botanical gardens in France
