= Église Sainte-Geneviève de Loqueffret =

Coordinates: 48.3195°N 3.8577°W

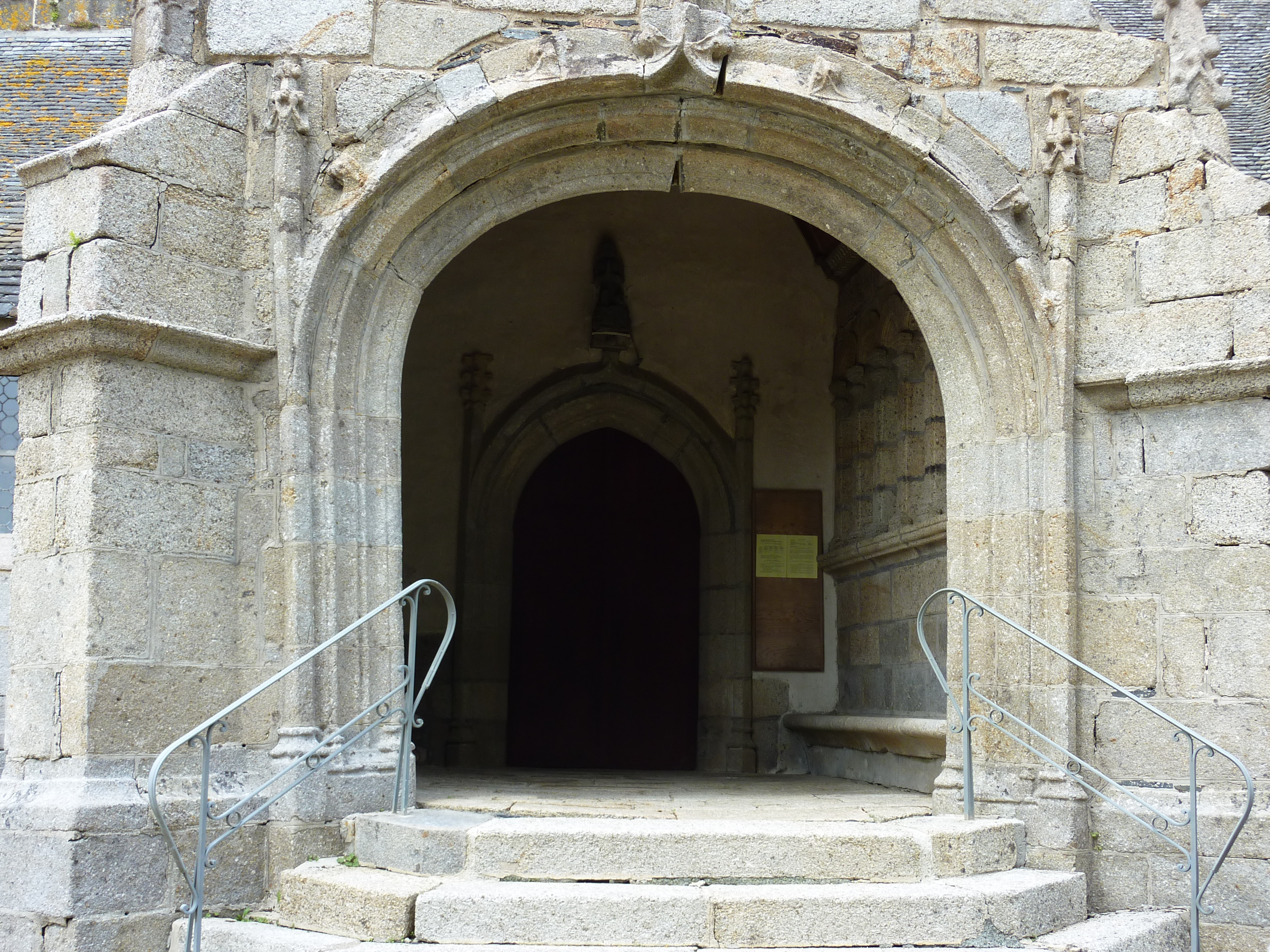
- The south porch of the Sainte-Geneviève church
- Église Sainte-Geneviève de Loqueffret
- Location: Loqueffret
- Country: France
- Denomination: Roman Catholic

Architecture
- Heritage designation: Monument historique
- Designated: 1916
- Architectural type: church
- Groundbreaking: 15th century
- Completed: 1850

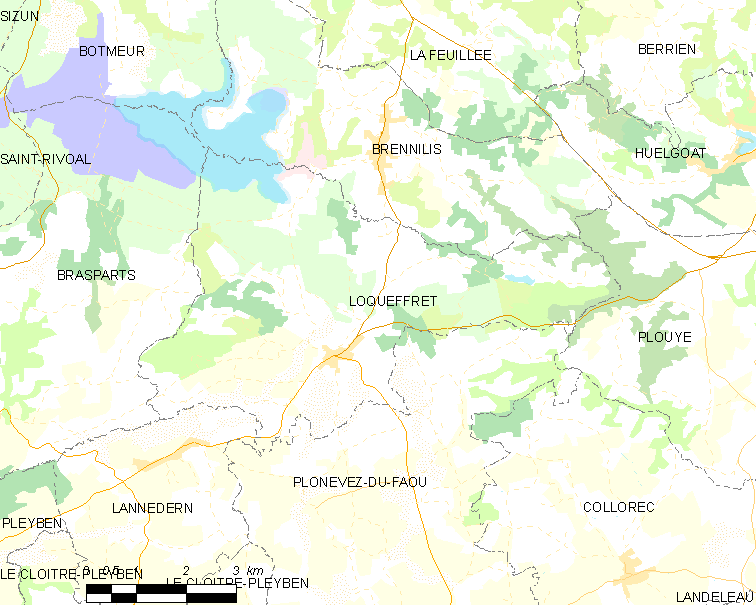
Map showing the location of Loqueffret

The Église Sainte-Geneviève de Loqueffret is a Roman Catholic parish church located at Loqueffret, situated in the arrondissement of Châteaulin and the department of Finistère in Brittany in north-western France. The parish church of Loqueffret was built in granite in the Gothic style in the 16th century and is dedicated to Saint Geneviève, a 10th-century Breton saint. The calvary dates to the 15th century. The existing bell-tower dates to 1771 and the bell-tower spire was designed by the architect Joseph Bigot and dates to 1850. The church has two large entrances on the west and south side.

== The calvary ==
The 6-metre-high calvary has a granite base, with a table (which could be used for offerings) and a stoup. The crosspiece and statuary are all carved from kersantite. At the base there is also a marble plaque with the inscription "MISSION 1923 40 JOURS D'INDULGENCE PATER AVE" ("mission 1923, 40 days of indulgence, Pater [Noster], Ave [Maria]"). The crucifixion cross includes a large titulus and on the reverse of the statue of the crucified Christ is a pietà. The good and bad robber's depictions have disappeared but the sculpture of an angel and a demon with tibia and skull have survived. On the lower crosspiece are statues of the Virgin Mary and John the Evangelist and below them and on the shaft of the cross there is a statue depicting Saint Geneviève. All three statues rest on a carving of a human head.

== Gallery of images ==
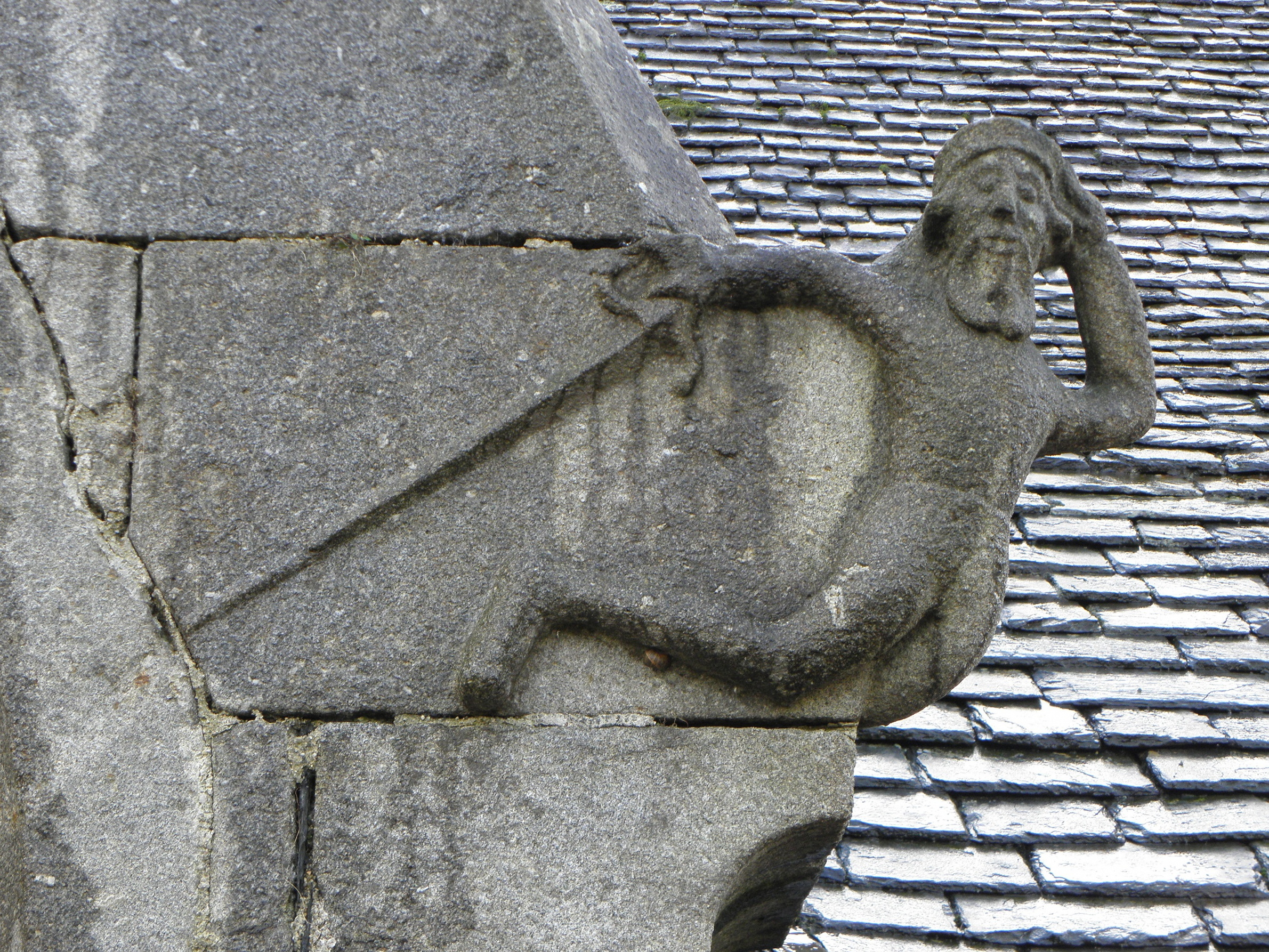
Unusual carving on church exterior at Loqueffret

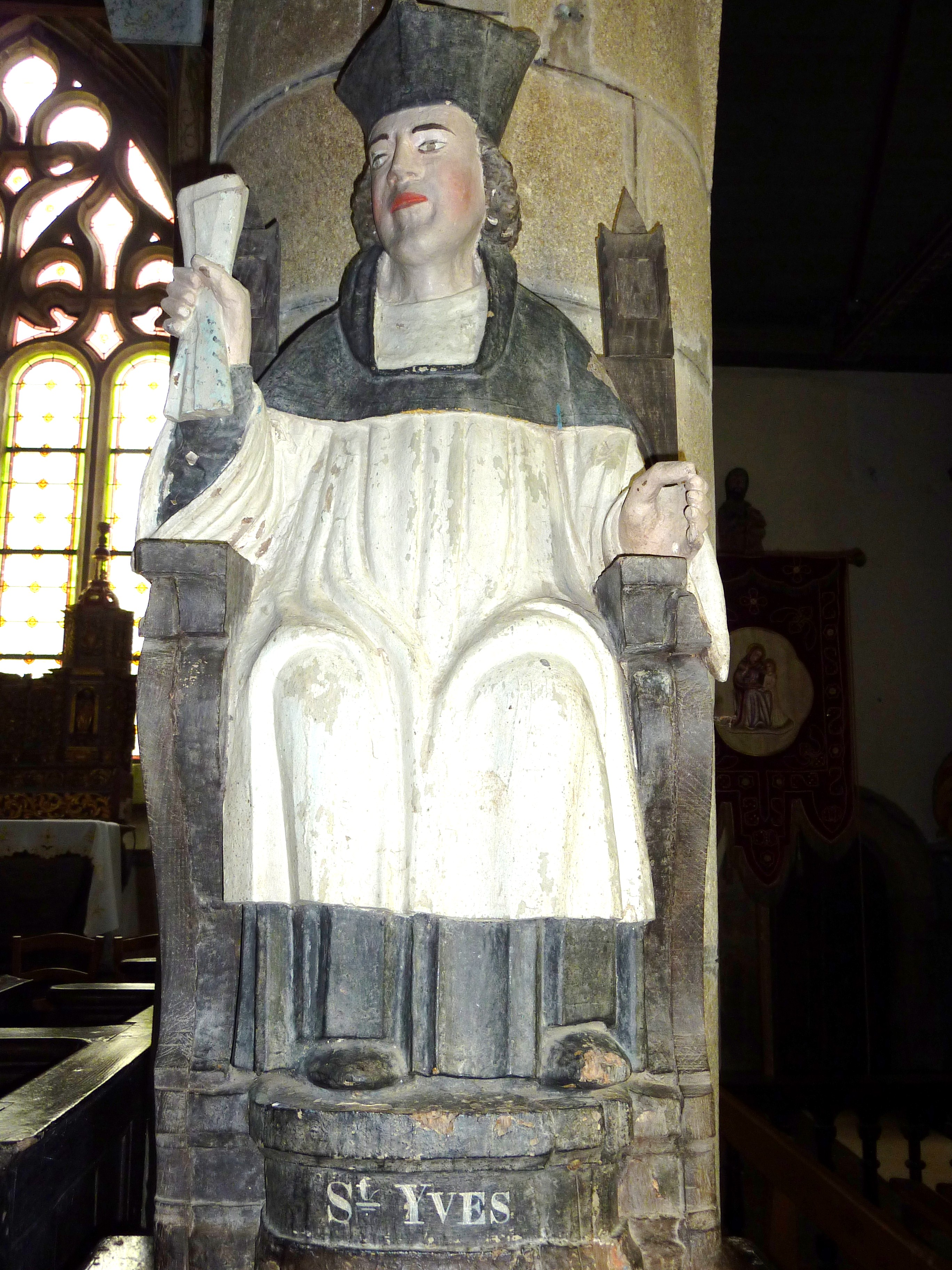
Statue of Saint Yves in the Église Sainte-Geneviève at Loqueffret

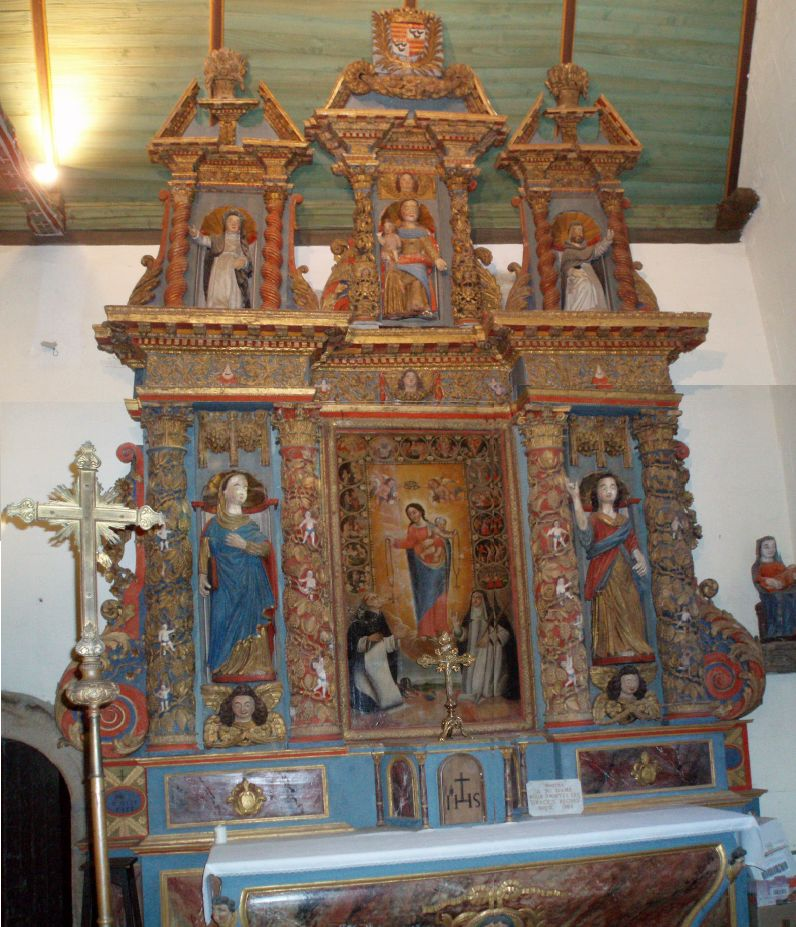
The baroque "Rosary" altarpiece in the Église Sainte-Geneviève at Loqueffret

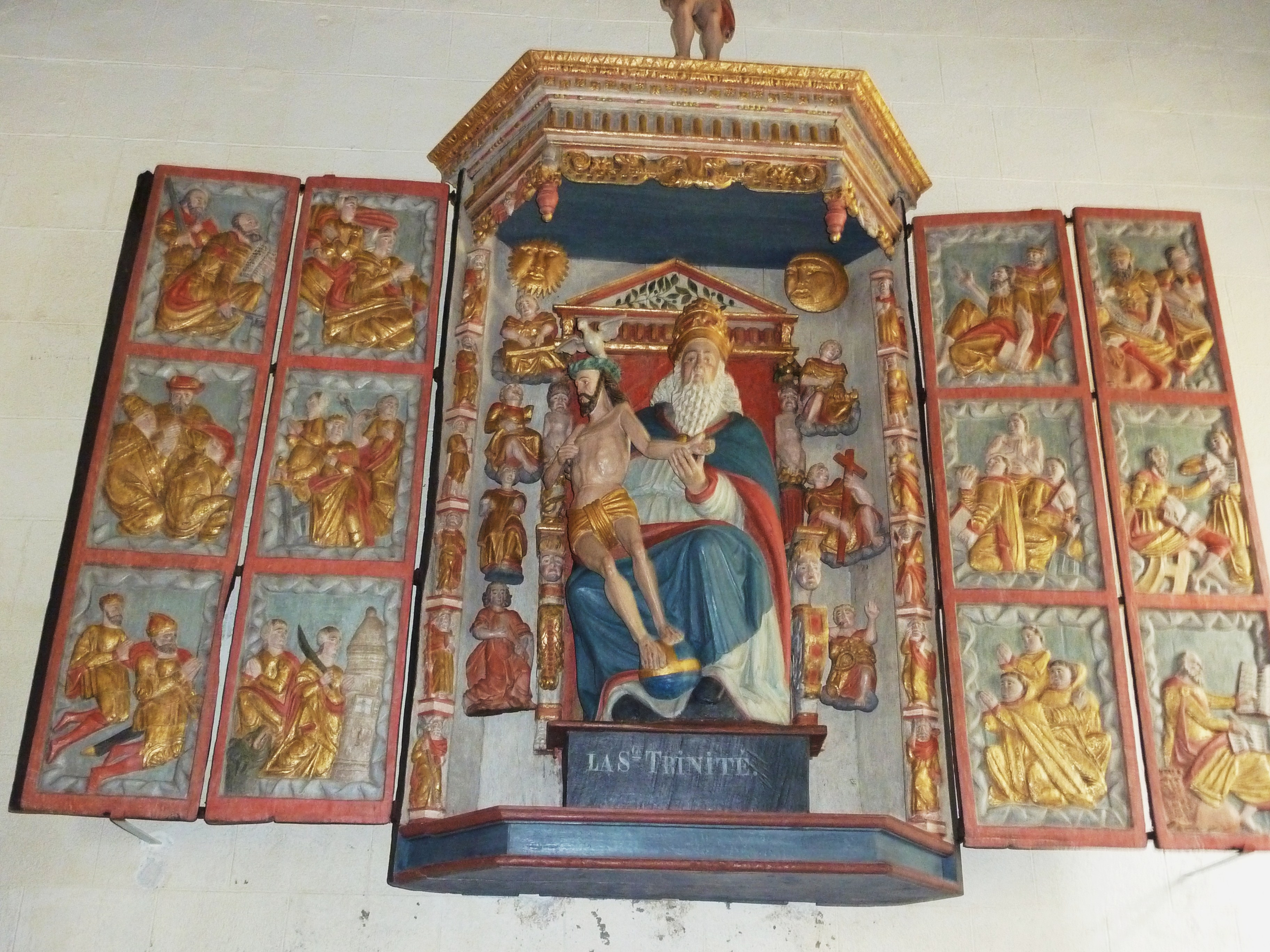
The remarkable "niche à volets" (literally translates as a shuttered niche)

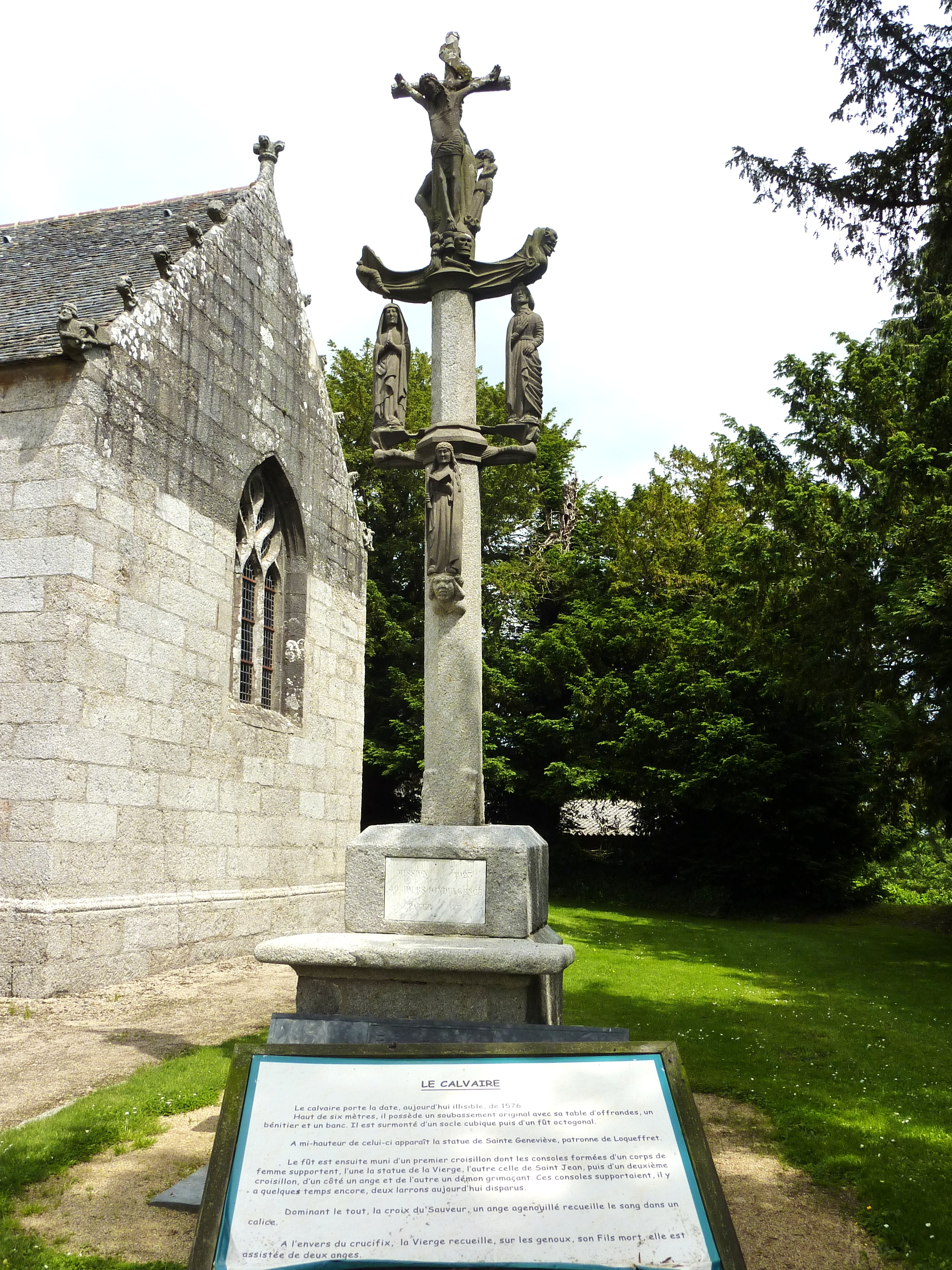
At the top of the calvary the sculpture depicting the crucified Christ has a pietà on the reverse side. Below is the upper crosspiece which has an angel and a demon depicted at its ends. There was originally a depiction of the good and bad robber on this crosspiece. On the lower crosspiece we see the sculptures depicting the Virgin Mary and John the Evangelist and below them the statue of Saint Geneviève
