= Loqueffret =

Loqueffret Lokeored
- Commune
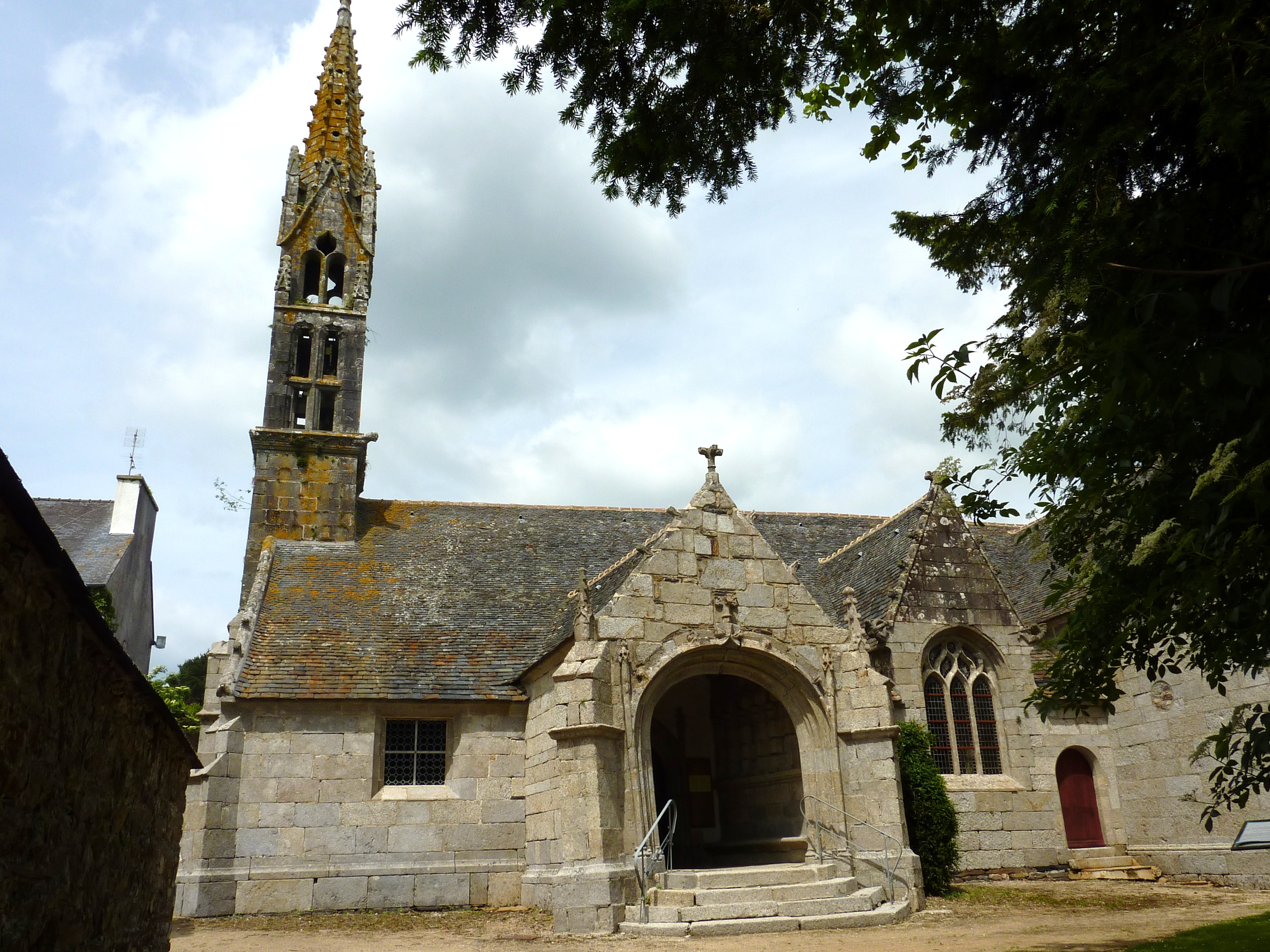
- The church of Sainte-Geneviève, in Loqueffret
- Location of Loqueffret
- Location within France Location within Brittany
- Coordinates: 48°19′20″N 3°51′14″W
- Country: France
- Region: Brittany
- Department: Finistère
- Arrondissement: Châteaulin
- Canton: Carhaix-Plouguer

Government
  - Mayor (2024–2026): Louis Marie Le Guillou
- Area^{1}: 27.40 km^{2} (10.58 sq mi)
- Highest elevation: 297 m (974 ft)
- Lowest elevation: 87 m (285 ft)
- Population (2023): 336
  - Density: 12.3/km^{2} (31.8/sq mi)
- Time zone: UTC+01:00 (CET)
  - Summer (DST): UTC+02:00 (CEST)
- INSEE/Postal code: 29141 /29530
- ^{1} French Land Register data, which excludes lakes, ponds, glaciers > 1 km^{2} (0.386 sq mi or 247 acres) and river estuaries.

Loqueffret (French pronunciation: [lɔkefʁɛt]; Breton: Lokeored) is a commune in the Finistère department of Brittany in north-western France.

Located south of the monts d ' Arrée, in the eastern part of the Armorique regional natural park, it is a small rural village, former home of the Pilhaouers. Covering 2 770 hectares, the commune had in 2006 of 406 inhabitants. Served by a dense drainage network, it presents two distinct part geographical entities and other sandstone of the monts d ' Arrée domes: northern slopes covered wildfires down towards Lake Saint-Michel, South of the slopes in crops or afforested, more conducive to agricultural soils.

"The parish church, the chapel of the cross and the Manor of du Rusquec remain important heritage sites, while the quality and variety of natural sites, paths and panoramas favour activities related to tourism rural

== Population ==
Inhabitants of Loqueffret are called in French Loqueffretois. In 1884 the commune of Brennilis was separated from Loqueffret.

Historical population

Year	Pop.	±% p.a.
1793	1,554	—
1800	1,689	+1.20%
1806	1,534	−1.59%
1821	1,767	+0.95%
1831	1,861	+0.52%
1836	1,890	+0.31%
1841	1,892	+0.02%
1846	1,927	+0.37%
1851	1,758	−1.82%
1856	1,763	+0.06%
1861	1,801	+0.43%
1866	1,920	+1.29%
1872	1,991	+0.61%
1876	1,986	−0.06%
1881	1,825	−1.68%
1886	997	−11.39%
1891	1,129	+2.52%
1896	1,135	+0.11%
1901	1,190	+0.95%

Year	Pop.	±% p.a.
1906	1,258	+1.12%
1911	1,316	+0.91%
1921	1,157	−1.28%
1926	1,115	−0.74%
1931	1,010	−1.96%
1936	990	−0.40%
1946	958	−0.33%
1954	802	−2.20%
1962	725	−1.25%
1968	692	−0.77%
1975	511	−4.24%
1982	482	−0.83%
1990	428	−1.47%
1999	435	+0.18%
2007	408	−0.80%
2012	395	−0.65%
2017	359	−1.89%
2023	336	−1.10%

Source: EHESS and INSEE (1968-2023)

== See also ==
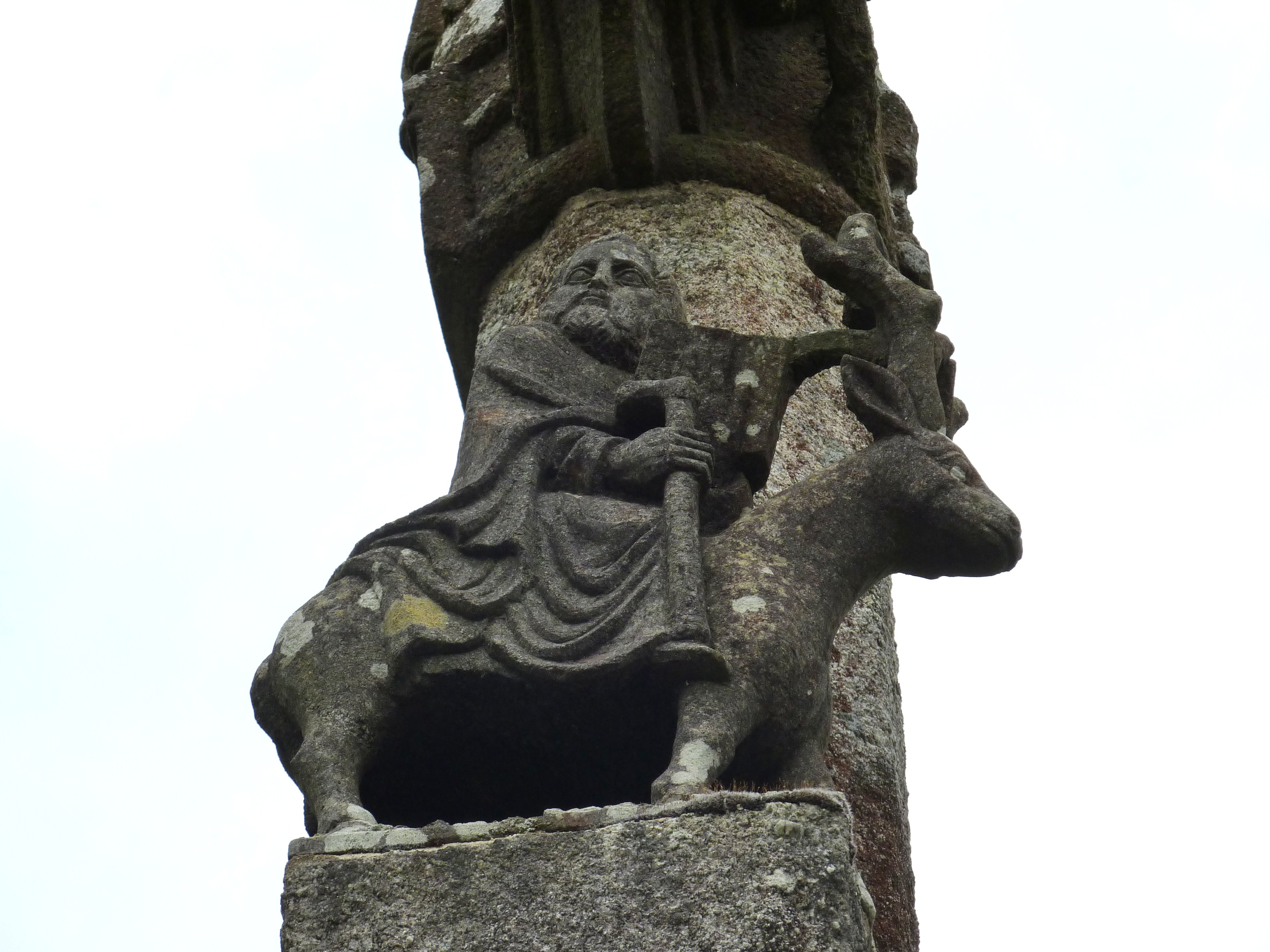
Loqueffret

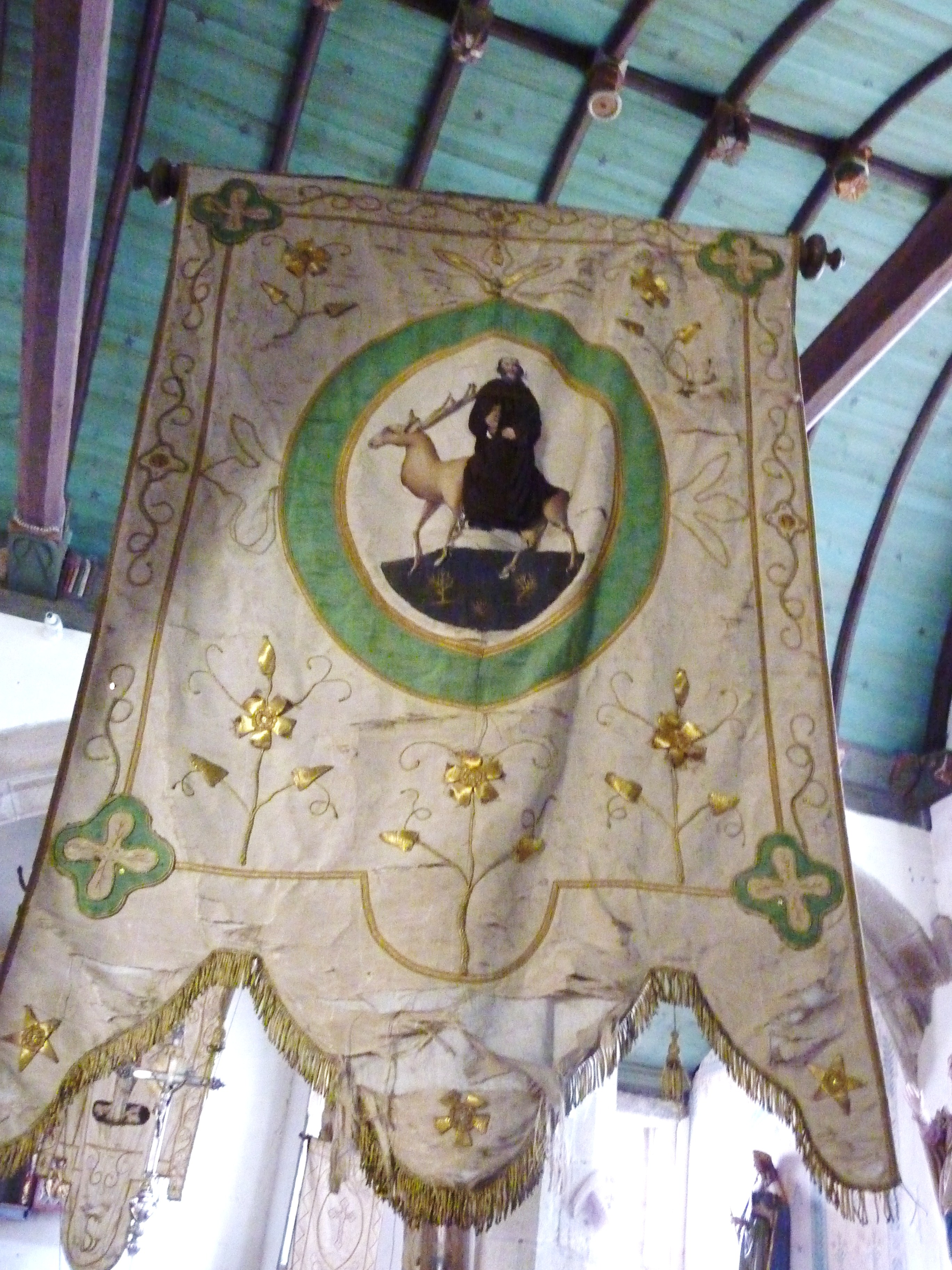
Banner of Saint Edeyrn at Loqueffret France.

- Communes of the Finistère department
- Parc naturel régional d'Armorique
- Loqueffret Parish close
