= List of the works of the Maître de Guimiliau =

This is a listing/"catalogue raisonnė" of the works of the Maître de Guimiliau who was active between 1575 and 1589. He is best known for his work on the Calvary at Guimiliau. The Maître de Guimiliau's workshop included a second sculptor whose name is not recorded but who contributed to the Guimiliau calvary and worked on the arc de triomphe at Saint-Thégonnec. All the work was completed using kersanton stone.

== Calvaries ==
Apart from the Guimiliau calvary, the Maître de Guimiliau worked on two other calvaries, those at Saint-Herbot and at Mespaul.

Type of sculpture	Location	Description|Notes
Chapel calvary	Mespaul	The Maître de Guimiliau worked on the calvary of the Sainte-Catherine chapel. He executed an ornate titulus, the crucifix and Saint Peter reversed with the Virgin Mary, and Mary Magdalene, He also executed a pietà for the pedestal.
Chapel calvary	Plonévez-du-Faou	The Maître de Guimiliau worked on the calvary at the Saint-Herbot chapel in 1575. His statuary included some angels praying, the crosses of the good and bad robbers, four angels with chalices surrounding the crucifix, a pietà and angels bearing the instruments of the passion. See also Calvary at Saint-Herbot near Plonévez-du-Faou and the Chapelle Saint-Herbot. The calvary at Plonévez-du-Faou

== Other ==
Type of sculpture	Location	Description|Notes
Decoration to the manor of Trébodennie	Ploudaniel	The Maître de Guimiliau executed all the decoration to the manor's entrance door. The manor of Trébodennie
Church decoration	Dirinon	The Maître de Guimiliau executed a statue of Sainte Nonne for a niche in the west façade of the Église Sainte-Nonne. See also Dirinon Parish close. Statue of Sainte Nonne

== Note ==
In his work on the Guimiliau calvary, the Maître de Guimiliau was assisted by another sculptor who worked on five scenes; the annunciation, the visitation, the circumcision, the entry into Jerusalem and "Christ aux outrages". This sculptor is also credited with the pietà, three of the evangelists, Luke, Mark and Matthew as well as Saint Pol de Lėon. The identity of this sculptor is not known.
