= Calvary at Guimiliau =

Group of religious statues in Brittany, France

Coordinates: 48.4931°N 4.0402°W

The Calvary at Guimiliau, completed in 1588, is located in Guimiliau, Brittany, in northwestern France. It is part of the Guimiliau "enclos paroissial" (Guimiliau Parish close).

== Background ==
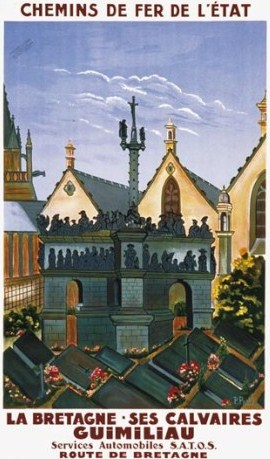
An old French Railway poster showing the Guimiliau calvary

The Guimiliau calvary is enormous and the statues displayed on it cover 37 scenes from the life and death of Jesus Christ. It comprises an octagonal base with arched corners/buttresses. The statues are spread over the surface (platform) of this base and along the frieze which runs around it. A single cross with crosspiece rises from the platform. It was built between 1581 and 1588. The date 1581 was inscribed on the architrave above the altar on the east facade and 1588 appears near the figure of the Virgin Mary in the scene depicting the Adoration of the Magi. The calvary was restored in 1881 and the lichens cleaned off in 2009. The buttress on the north-east corner has a small stairway leading up to the main surface of the platform. This enabled the calvary to be used as a pulpit. The priest could deliver a sermon, surrounded by pictorial representations of the stories he would relate to a largely illiterate congregation. Each buttress has a niche on the outer side in which there are depictions of the Evangelists each sculpted with their attribute. The main facade is that on the west side and this has an altar added to it. This altar has a column on each side, these supporting the architrave and in a niche here is a depiction of saint Paul Aurelian who founded the diocese of Léon. The various statues are placed on the main platform and along the frieze which runs around the plinth. The figures on the frieze are smaller than those on the platform and those on the platform are in ronde bosse whilst those on the frieze are in high relief. On the frieze above the columns of the altar there is an inscription reading

"AD GLORIAM DOMINI-1581-CRUX EGO FACTA FUI"

== The Cross ==
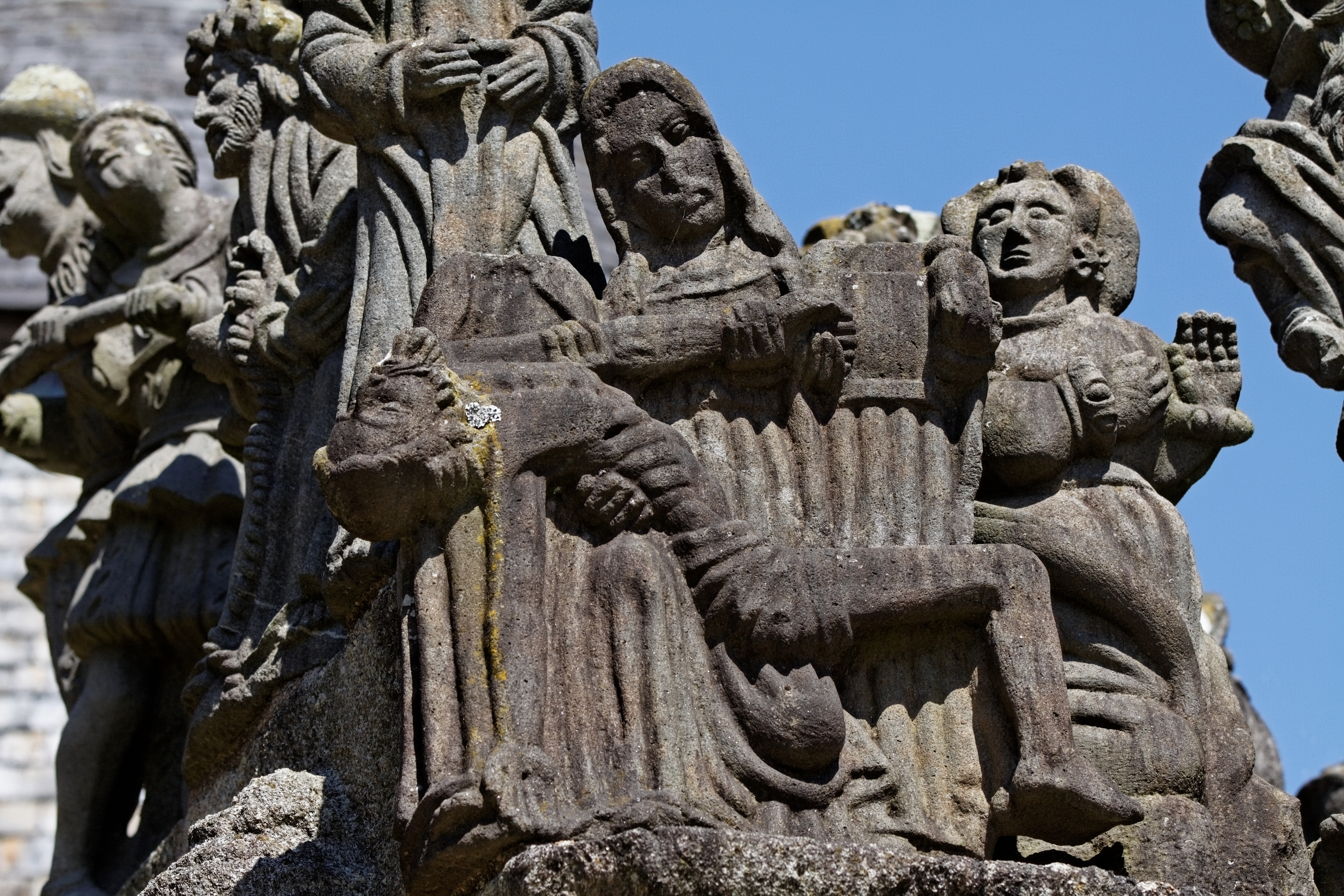
The emaciated body of Jesus is brought down from the cross.

The cross has a granite shaft and the crucified Jesus, sculpted in kersanton, is attended by four angels who are collecting his blood. On the crosspiece below are back to back ("géminée") depictions of the Virgin Mary and St Peter and John the Evangelist and Saint Yves. The top part of the cross was damaged in a storm in 1902 and refashioned by Yann Larhantec.

== The west face of the calvary ==
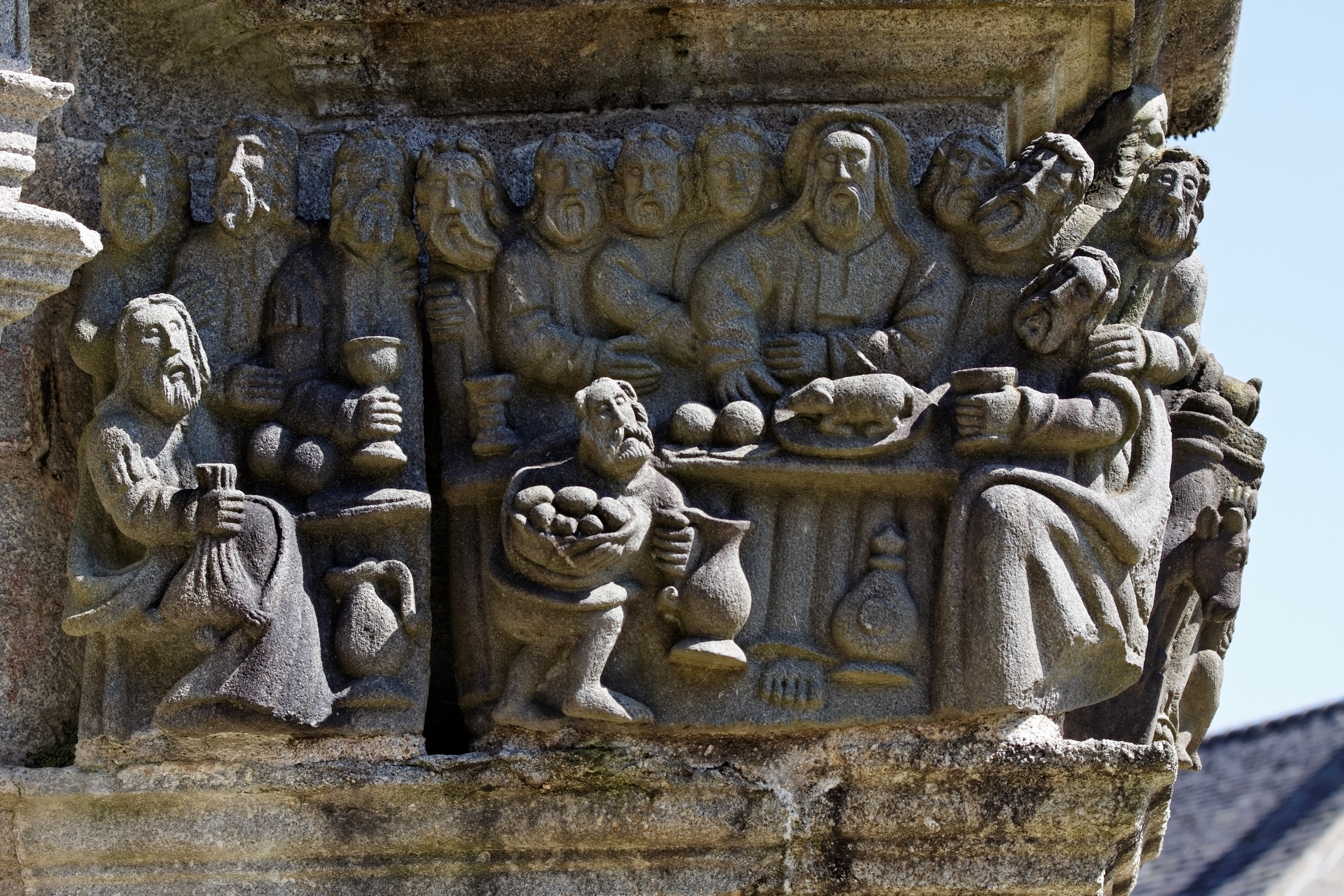
The scene involving the "last supper". Ten of the disciples sit behind the table with Judas and another disciple sitting at the table ends. Judas (on the left) holds a purse. A servant is seen carrying a basket of bread rolls and a carafe of wine whilst other wine jugs can be seen laying under the table. On a plate before Jesus is the pascal lamb

Firstly on this face on the calvary there is a niche on the arched buttress which contains a statue of Paul Aurelian. Then on the upper surface of the west facing side, the first two sculptures deal with the Crown of thorns. Firstly we see Jesus seated and with his hands tied. He awaits his fate with an air of resignation. Then we see four soldiers in the act of forcing the crown down onto Jesus' head in a most brutal way. The remaining statuary on the west side platform deals with the Resurrection of Jesus. Jesus stands upright and emerges from the tomb whilst at his feet guards sleep, surrounded by a heap of discarded weaponry. They have perhaps drunk too much wine as one clutches a wine jug. Jesus raises his hand to give a blessing and in the other hand he holds the "Cross of resurrection". To his left, a soldier stands open-eyed in wonder to see the scene before him. He holds up a shield bearing a depiction of a lion. Apart from the two sleeping guards another soldier stands and views the scene with astonishment. Next we have a pietà covering the scene after Jesus has been taken down from the cross and finally we are given a view of the mouth of hell which includes the legendary Katell Gollet, who had taken the devil as a lover and is now shown trapped and fleeing from her lover whilst above a trumpet sounds the Last Judgement. Finally, we have the niche holding the statue of John the Evangelist shown with his attribute, the eagle. The eagle in fact, stands alone. The frieze on this side has a depiction of the Entry into Jerusalem and then, after the statue of saint Pol, there is a scene showing the Last Supper.

- In the scene depicting Jesus being crowned with thorns, Jesus is sat with hands tied whilst soldiers use a bar to force the crown into his flesh.
- In the scene depicting the entry into Jerusalem, a disciple lays a cloak under the feet of the donkey as the entourage arrives and the sculptor has added an olive tree to the composition.

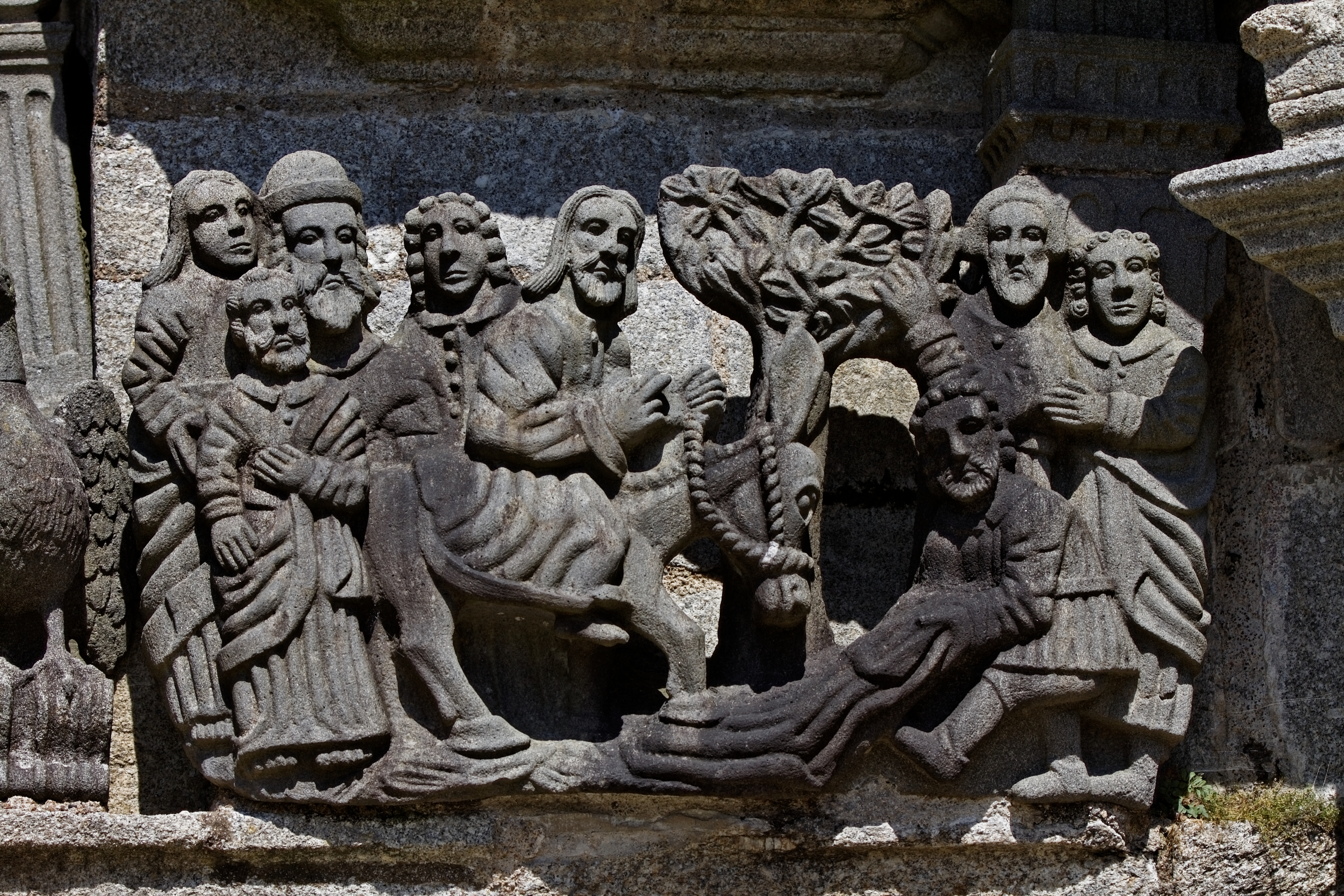
The scene showing the entry into Jerusalem

== The east face of the calvary ==
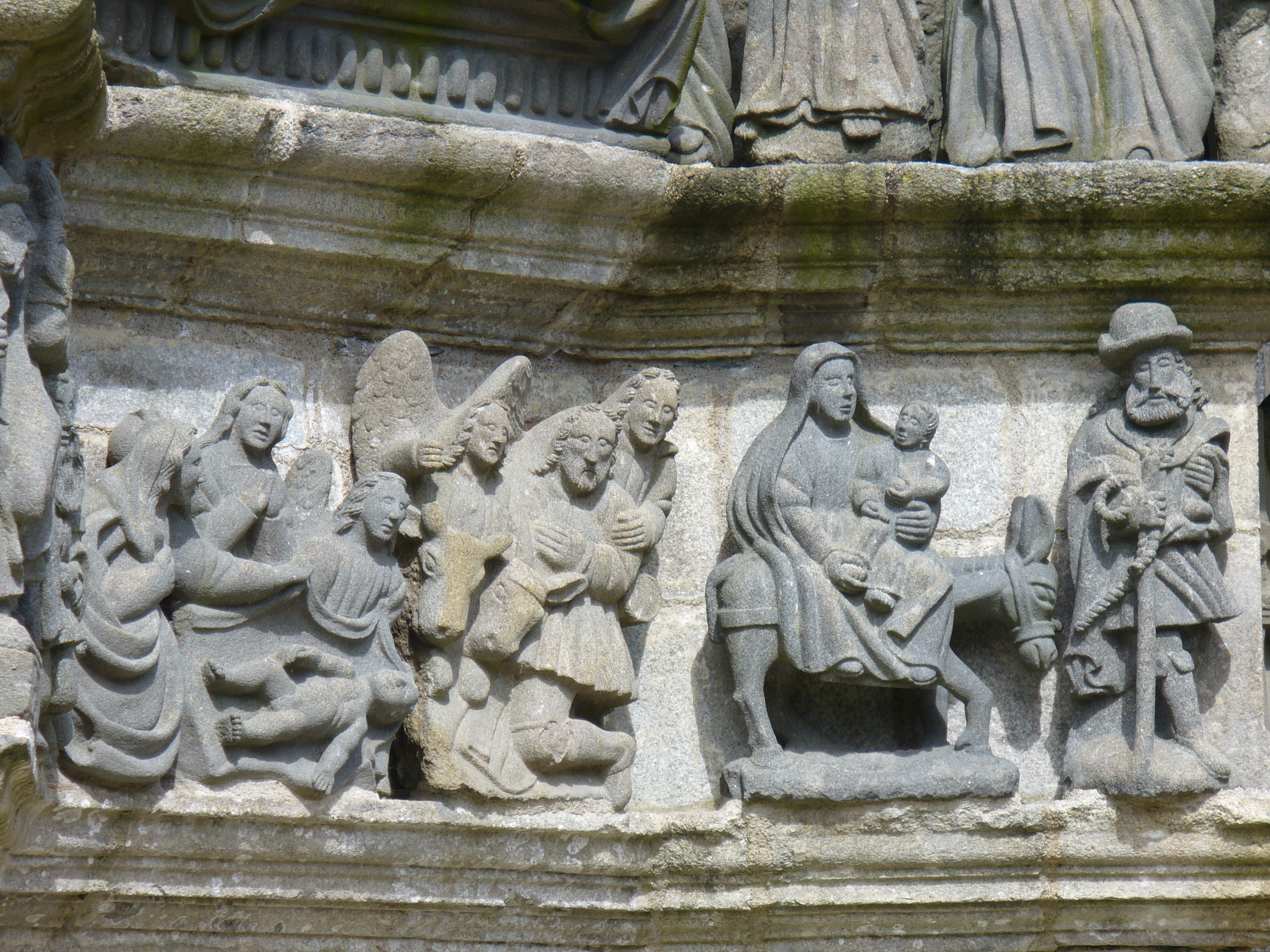
In this scene we see the nativity with Mary and Joseph being helped by two angels whilst next to the heads of two cattle another angel brings two shepherds to see the baby. On the right is the Flight into Egypt with Mary sitting side-saddle on an ass and holding baby Jesus. Joseph leads, his pilgrim's stick reminding us that they have set out on a long journey

On the upper surface of the east facing side, we firstly have a statue of a cavalier on horseback this being the figure who leads the scene covering Christ Carrying the Cross. Then we see Jesus being mocked and teased, then the "mise au tombeau" with Jesus' body being prepared for burial and finally Pontius Pilate depicted washing his hands. The frieze below concentrates on Jesus' childhood with a depiction of the Adoration of the Magi then the Nativity and culminating with the Flight into Egypt. We then have the niche containing Mark the Evangelist and his attribute the lion.

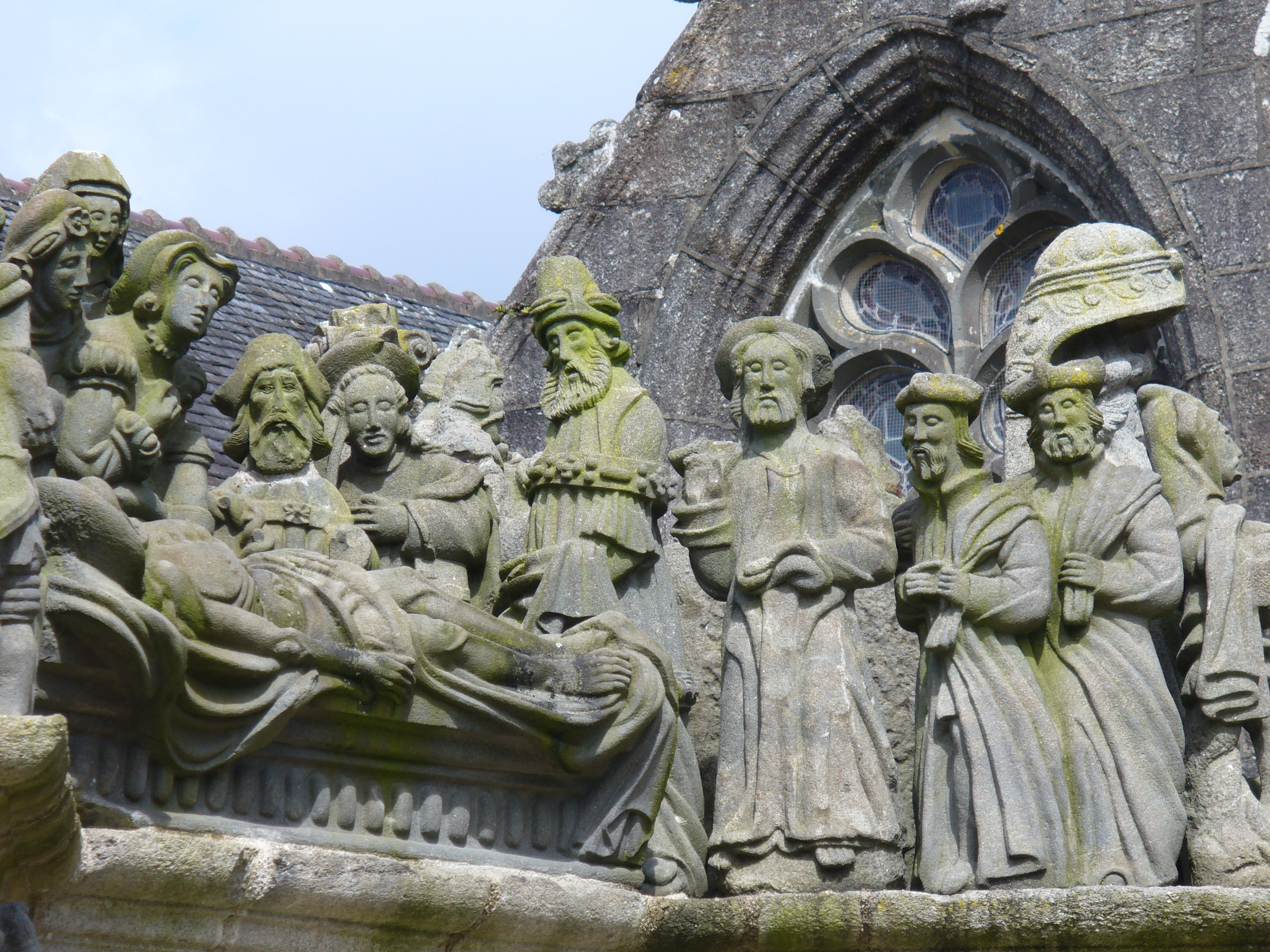
The "mise au tombeau". Part of the Guimiliau calvary. Jesus' body has been taken down from the cross and his body is prepared for burial. Nine people are present and in the centre the three Marys (Mary Salome, Mary Cleophas and Mary Magdalene) comfort each other. It has been written that the image of Mary Magdalene is based on Mary Stuart who was beheaded in 1587 and came to Roscoff to marry François 11. Near the head of Jesus is the Virgin Mary, her arms crossed against her chest, next to Nicodemus who holds the shroud. At Jesus' feet is a depiction of Joseph of Arimathea with John the Evangelist and Gamaliel. Behind Joseph of Arimathea are a group of pilgrims from Emmaüs. The Guimiliau calvary is the only calvary to deal with the journey to Emmaüs. Jesus has now risen and leads Cleophas and another to Emmaüs.

== South face of the calvary ==
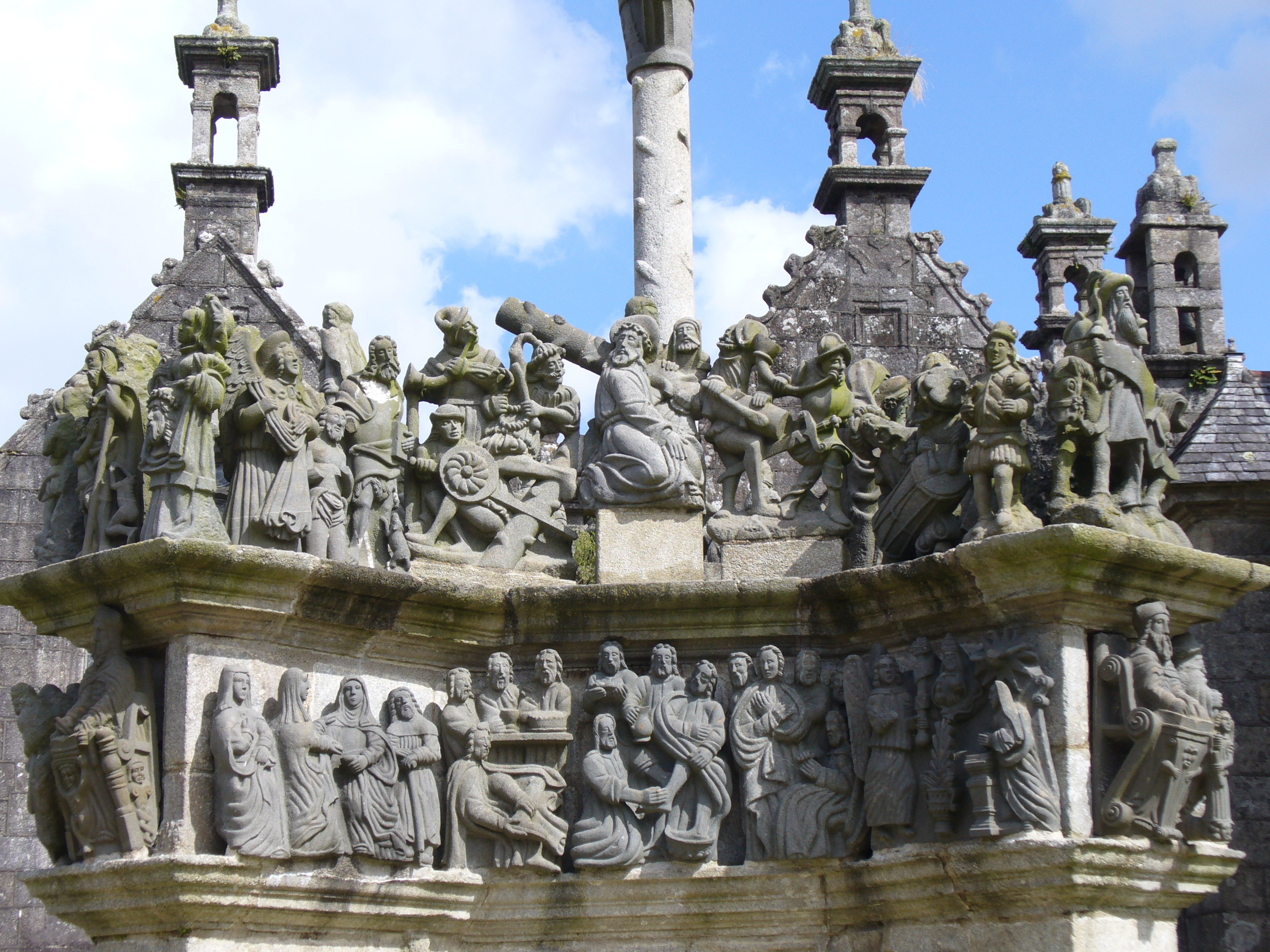
The south face of the calvary at Guimiliau. The statuary on the upper surface is dominated by the procession involving Christ Carrying the Cross to Calvary where he will be crucified. On the left corner, one firstly sees the scene dealing with the Harrowing of Hell before the image of Saint Veronica holding out her veil which now carries Jesus' image, and then, rather oddly positioned, Jesus' baptism by John the Baptist. Now we have the scene covering Christ Carrying the Cross and encounter a group of soldiers who accompany Jesus. Some carry arms, some play instruments and some deliberately and maliciously push down on the cross to increase its weight. Then we see Jesus himself with Simon of Cyrene and then more soldiers and finish on the far right where those leading the cortege are shown, including one riding a horse. On the lower frieze is seen the seated Luke the Evangelist in the niche at the end of the arched buttress, then, starting on the left, the visitation followed by the scene showing Jesus washing the disciples feet and finally the Annunciation, before the depiction of Matthew the Evangelist in the niche on the right-hand-side arched buttress.

On the upper surface of the south facing side, there is firstly a depiction of Jesus leading an innocent from Hell. This is followed by Saint Veronica holding her veil upon which Jesus' image has appeared. The next scene covers Jesus' baptism followed by a depiction of Jesus carrying the Cross. Then on the frieze below is a statue depicting the seated Luke the Evangelist with his attribute the ox, his statue contained in a niche followed by a scene depicting the visitation. Saint Elizabeth and a servant greet the Virgin Mary. Next, comes a depiction of Jesus washing a disciple's feet with the Annunciation being the last scene shown on the frieze. In the niche in the next buttress is a depiction of Matthew the Evangelist with his attribute, a small boy.

- The depiction of the ritual of Jesus washing the disciples' feet comes in three sections. In the first, a disciple is seated whilst three disciples stand behind waiting their turn and taking a glass which sits on a small table. In the central section Jesus, his sleeves rolled up, kneels before Saint Peter and rubs his right foot vigorously. The other foot rests in a bowl of water. Behind them another two disciples carry a basin and a jug of water, this to be used for rinsing. In the third and final group John the Evangelist has his arms crossed and stands with the other four disciples, one of whom is seated. All the disciples appear to greet Jesus' action with incomprehension and discomfort, not understanding and not comfortable with the apparent change of roles occurring.
- On the corner on the calvary's south-west face, Jesus is shown leading the damned from Limbo—see Harrowing of Hell, this before we encounter St Veronica with her veil and Jesus' baptism, before coming to the main procession involving Christ Carrying the Cross.
- At this point and just after the depiction of St Veronica, we see Jesus' baptism by John the Baptist in the presence of an angel—the Baptism of Jesus. The angel holds Jesus' tunic whilst the baptism takes place. John the Baptist wears an animal skin and holds a book in one hand. The other hand, with which John pours the water of the River Jordan onto Jesus' head, is broken.
- The scene depicting Christ Carrying the Cross is perhaps the most spectacular part of the Guimiliau calvary. Jesus carrying his cross does of course dominate the scene but the disposition and treatment of those forming the procession create a feeling of movement. The cortège is led by a cavalier on horseback and includes a soldier beating out a rhythm on a tambour and another blowing a trumpet. The soldier in front of Jesus leans maliciously on the cross to increase its weight. Simon of Cyrene helps Jesus to carry the cross and a second soldier is shown behind Jesus blowing another trumpet. Another sits with a shield and another carries a whip which he presses down on the cross which includes both patibulum and stipes. Note that the soldiers in this scene wear the military dress prevalent at the time of the Catholic League (French).
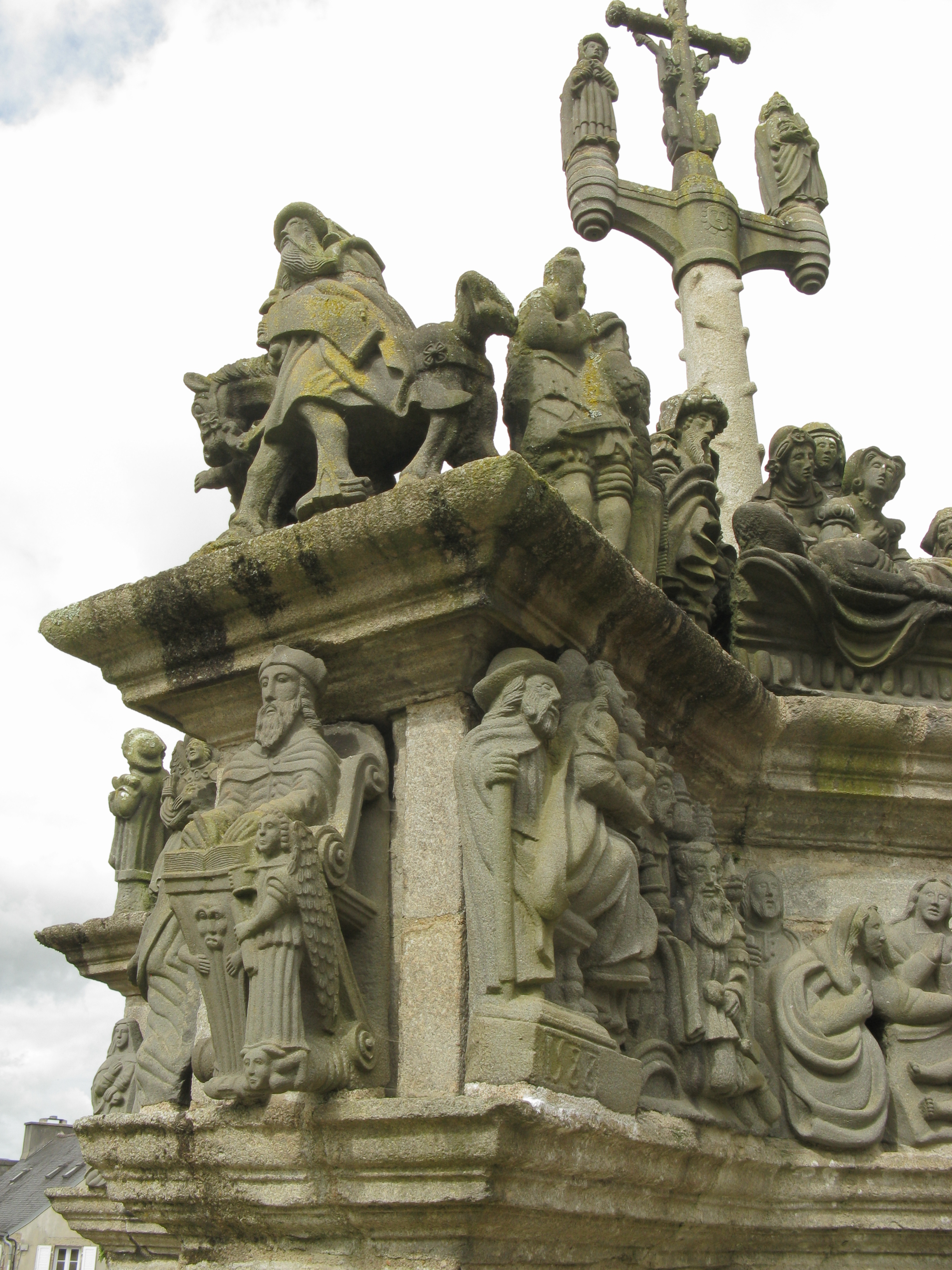
The horseman leading the cortege of Christ Carrying the Cross. In the niche below we see the seated St Matthew.

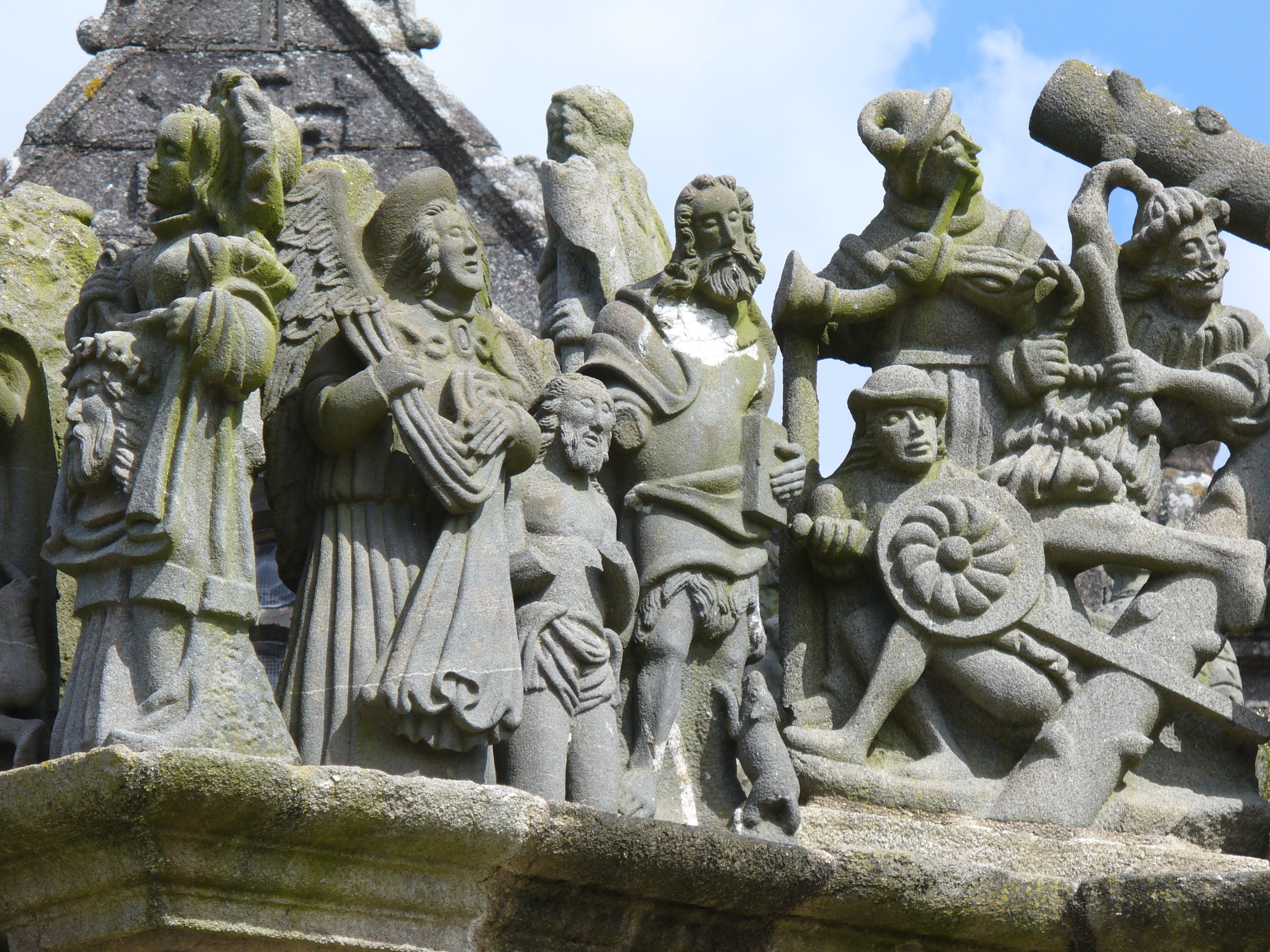
Part of the procession accompanying Jesus carrying the Cross to Golgotha. On the left we see St Veronica with her veil, then Jesus being baptized and then some of the soldiers accompanying Jesus.

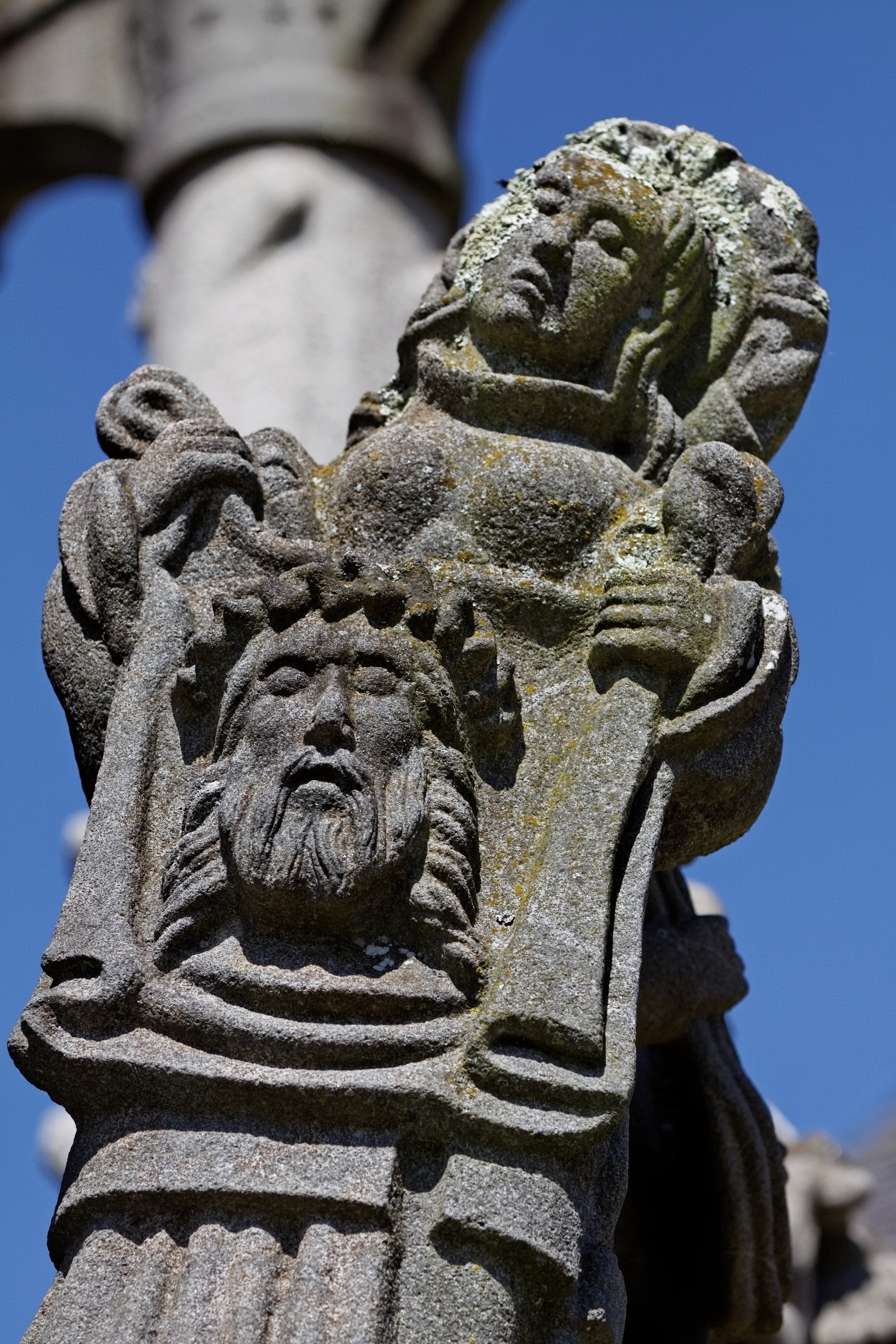
St Veronica holds up her veil bearing Jesus' image.

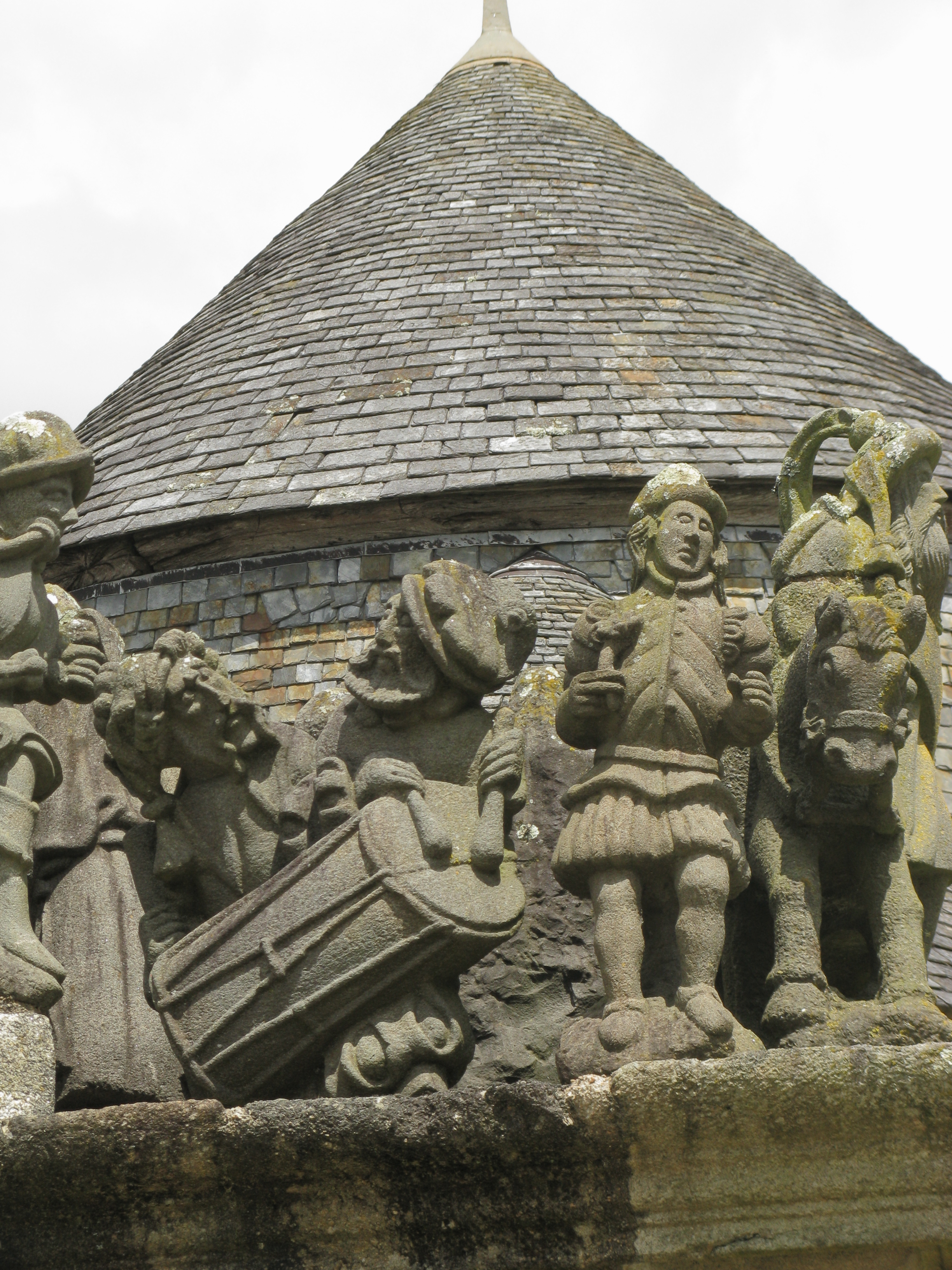
The front of the procession of Christ Carrying the Cross. A soldier beats out a rhythm on a tambour.

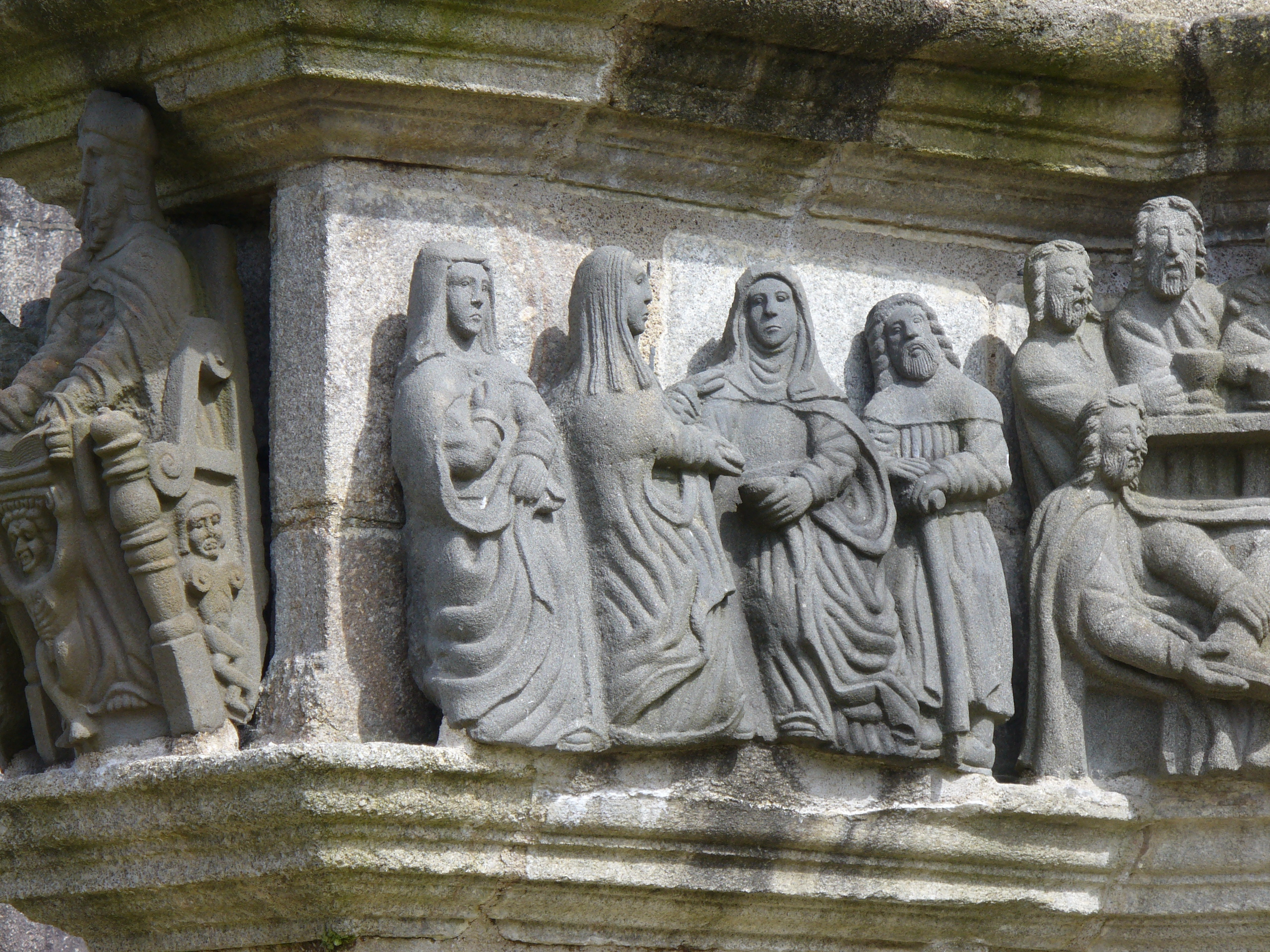
The visitation. Mary meets with St Elizabeth.

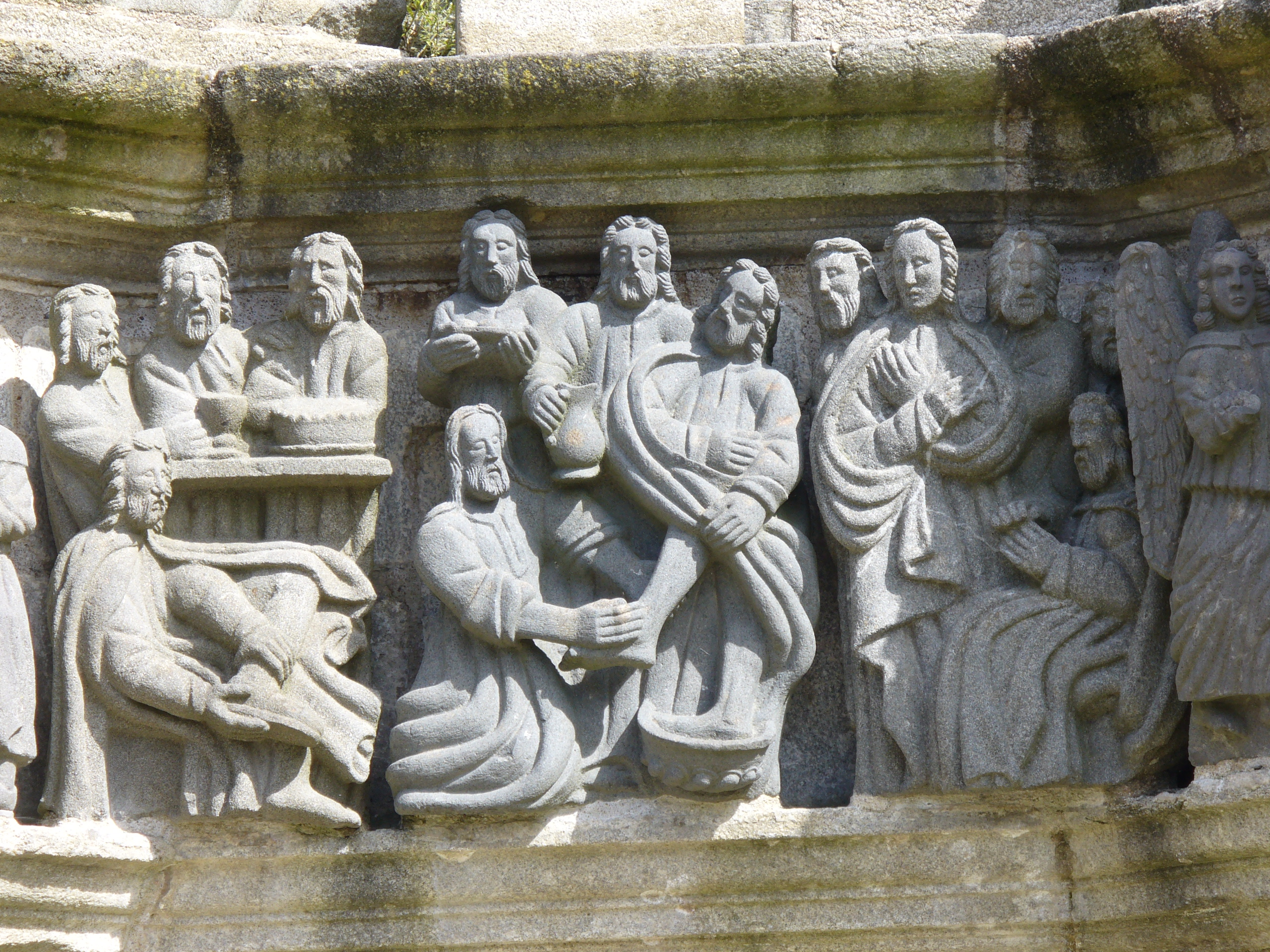
Jesus washing the disciples' feet. Note that the disciple sitting on the far left is taking off his shoes ready to take his turn.

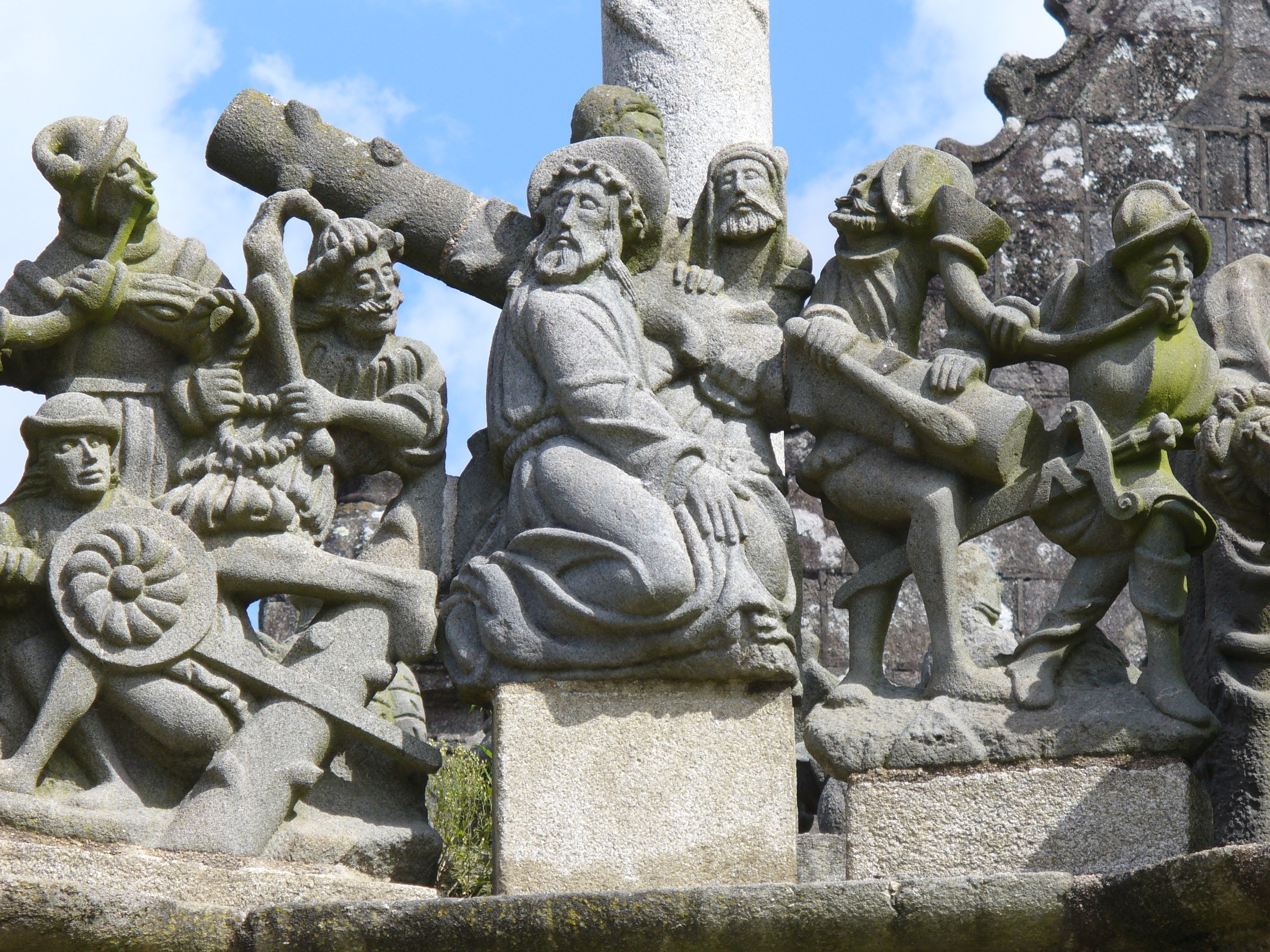
Jesus struggles to carry the cross to Calvary Hill

== The north face of the calvary ==
On the upper surface of the north face, we start on the left with Pontius Pilate sitting on his throne and washing his hands. His servant is preparing the water and a small dog can be seen at his feet. This is followed by two Pharisees who are holding law books and a copy of the written accusation concerning Jesus. Then we see Jesus tied up by four Roman soldiers who are mocking him, this followed by the actual flogging. Jesus is tied to a column and is being whipped by one of the soldiers whilst two others chat and a fourth lays sleeping at Jesus' feet. On the section of frieze below we have Mark the Evangelist, then the circumcision and then Jesus praying in Gethsemane with three of the disciples asleep. Finally, we see Judas holding his purse, Jesus' arrest and St Peter taking out his sword to cut off Malchus's ear.

- In the scene depicting Jesus' arrest the three soldiers involved wear renaissance costume and sport large moustaches.

== The church ==
The Église Saint-Miliau, the parish church in the Guimiliau enclos paroissial, has a magnificently carved porch dating to 1606-1617 and a 16th-century bell tower in the Beaumanoir style. The ossuary ("Chapelle funéraire") dates to 1648.

== Gallery ==
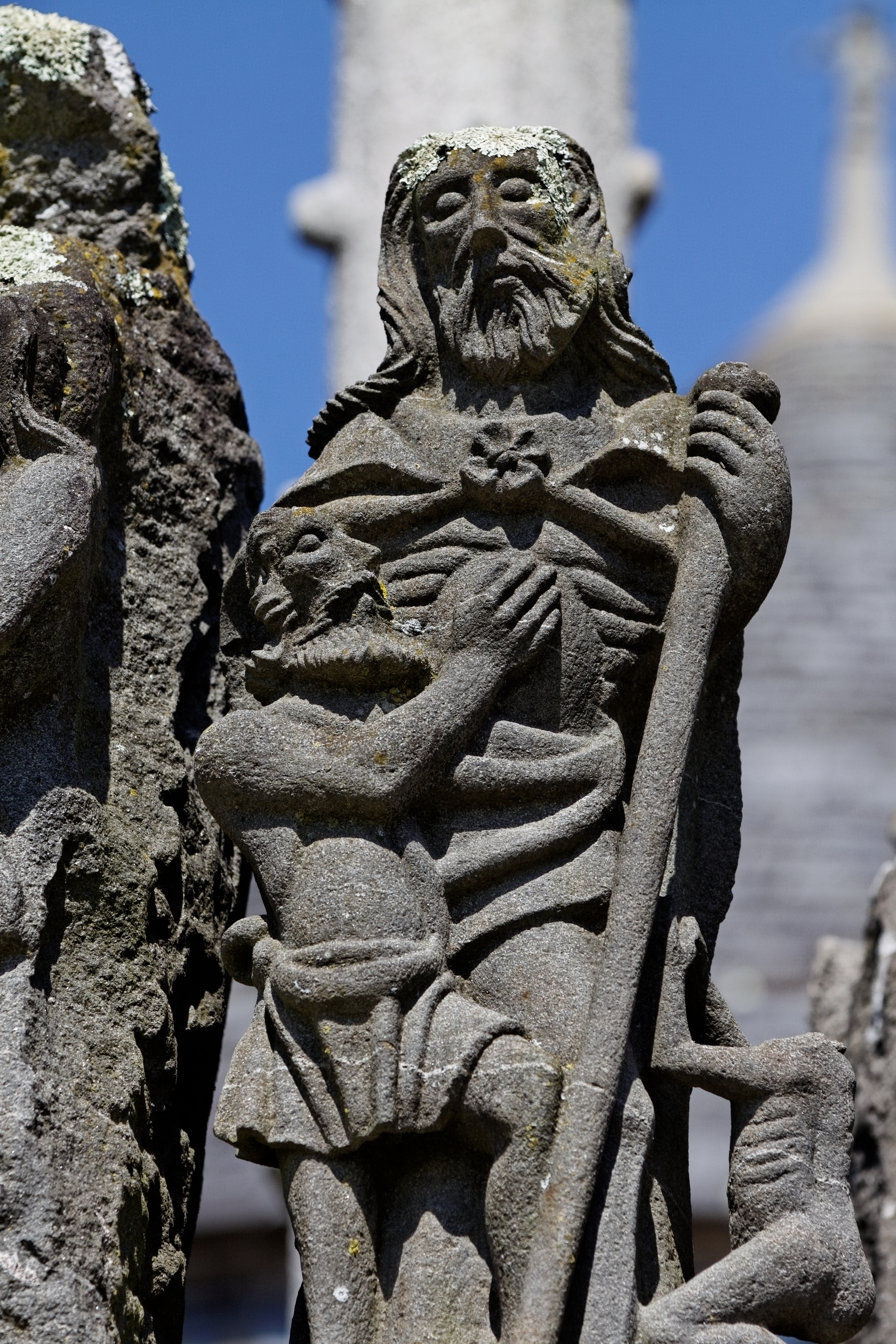
Jesus has reclaimed an innocent from the jaws of Hell.

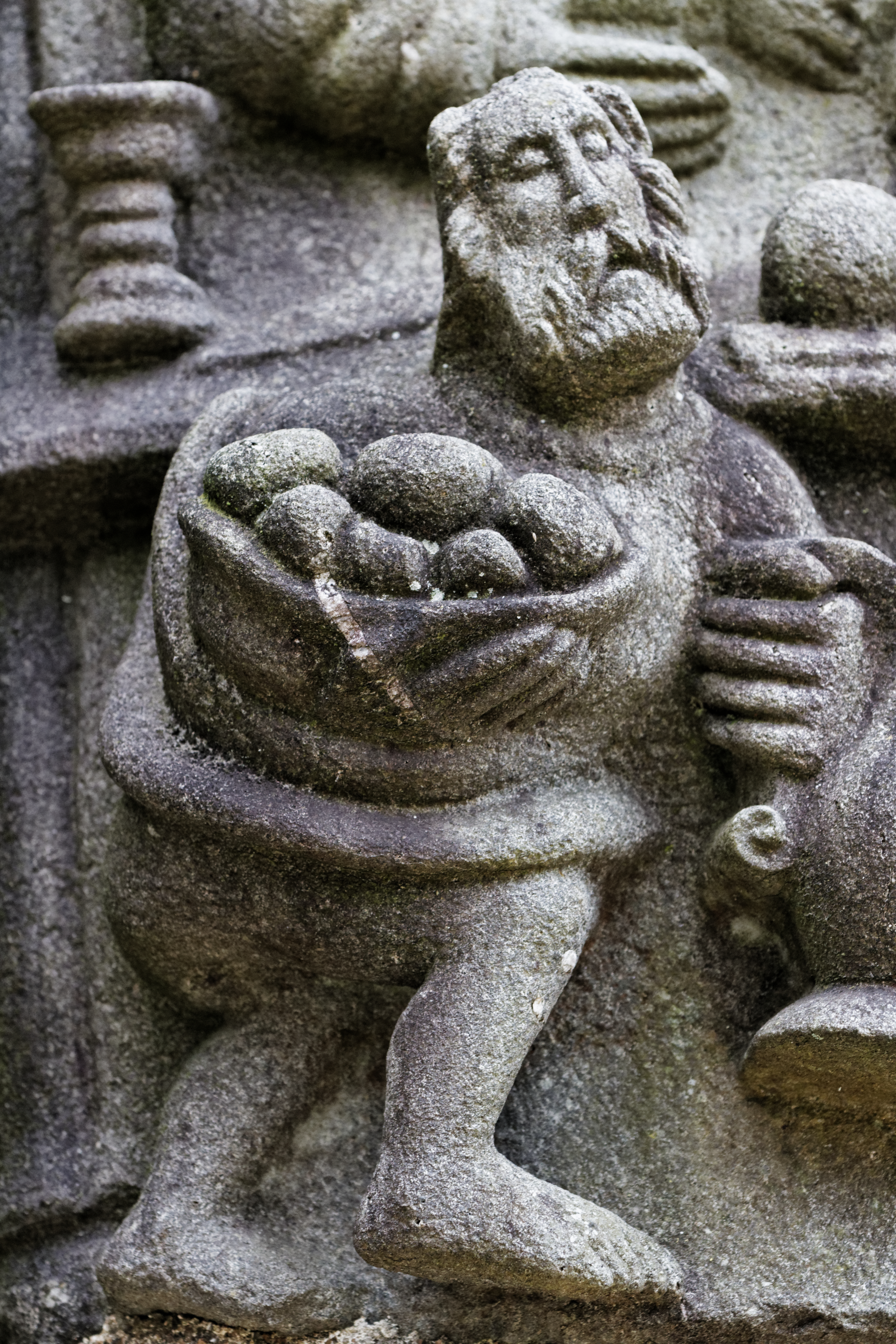
At the "Last Supper" a servant is busy serving bread rolls and wine.

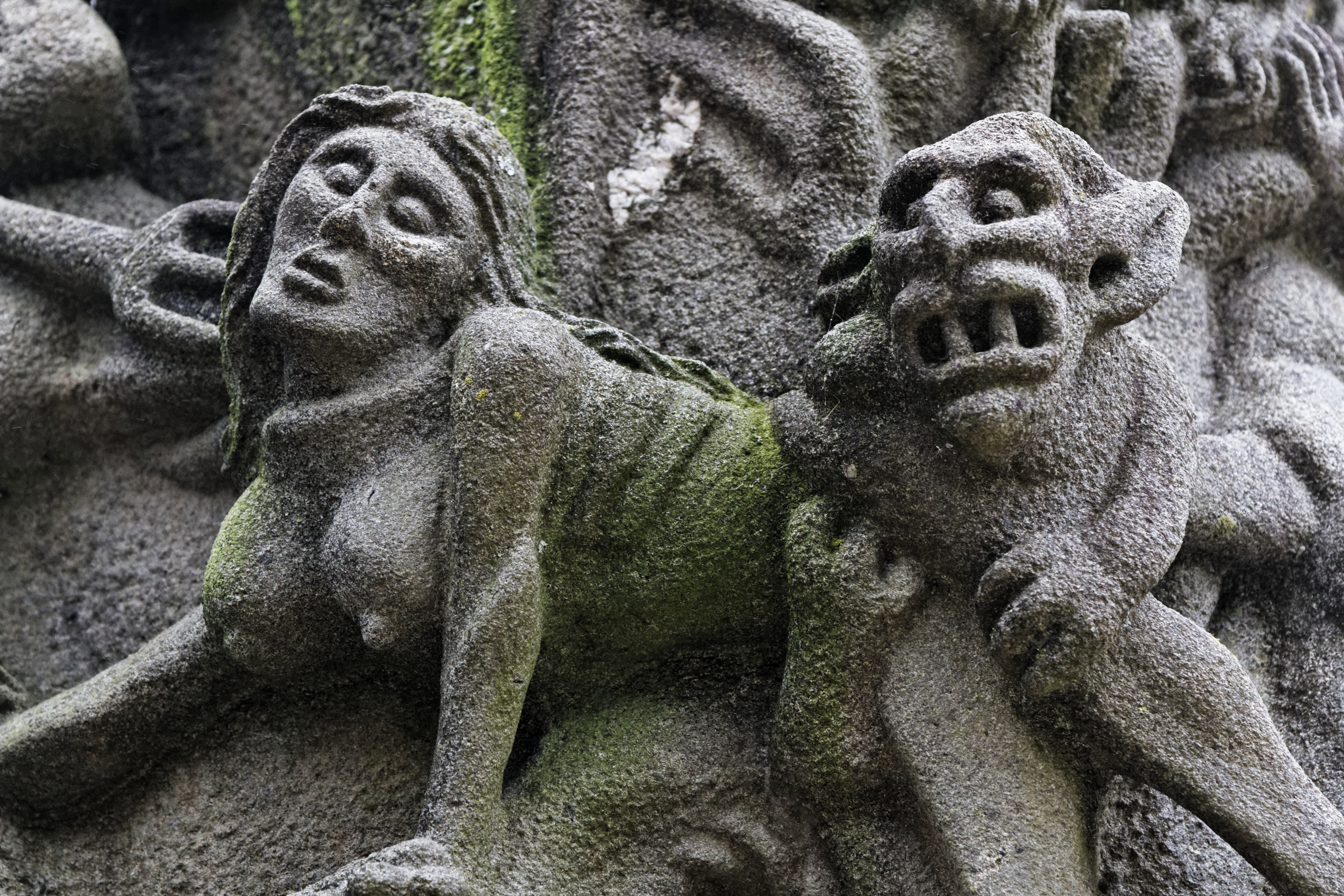
The unfortunate Kattell Gollet tries to escape the devil who pursues her.

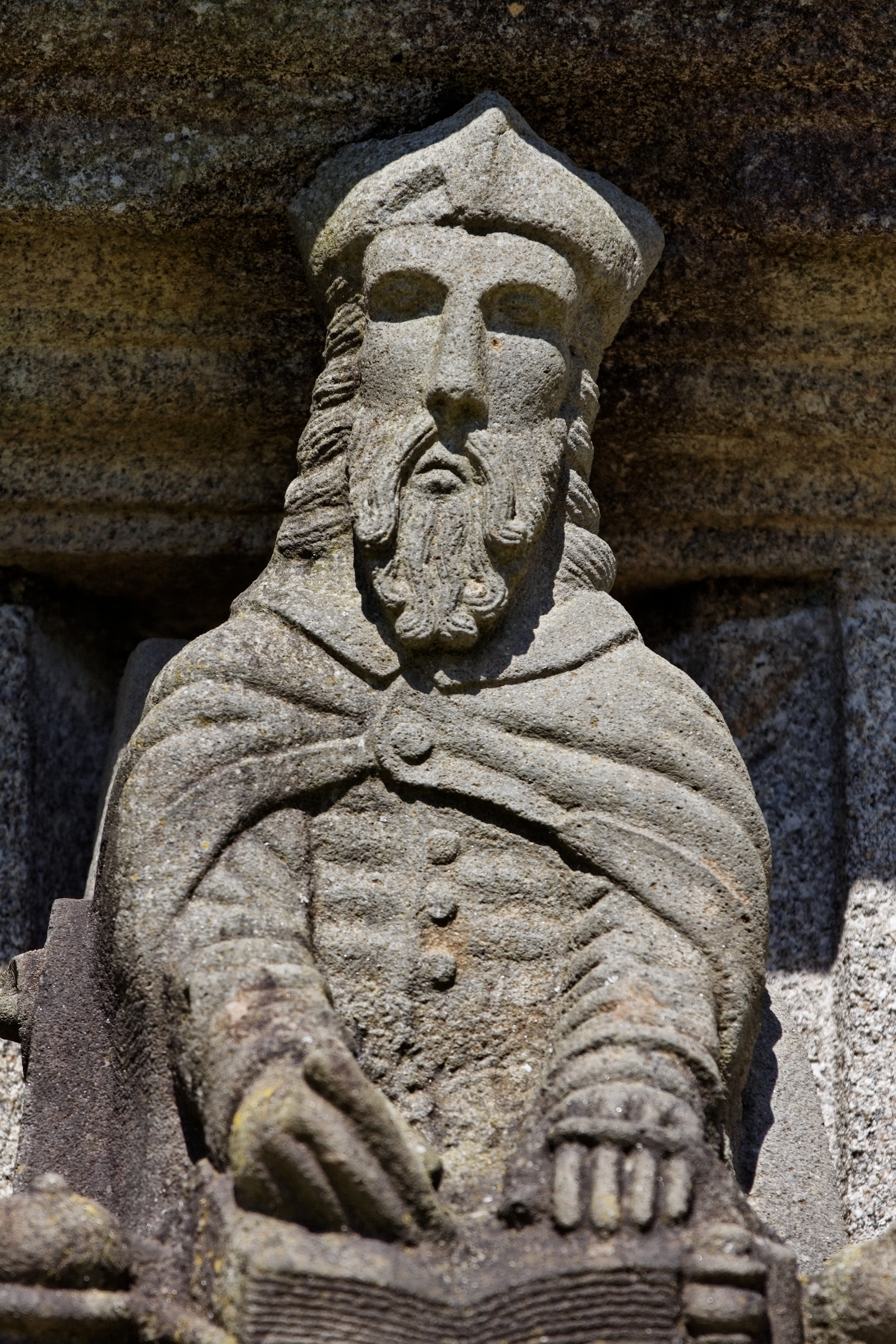
St Matthew in his niche

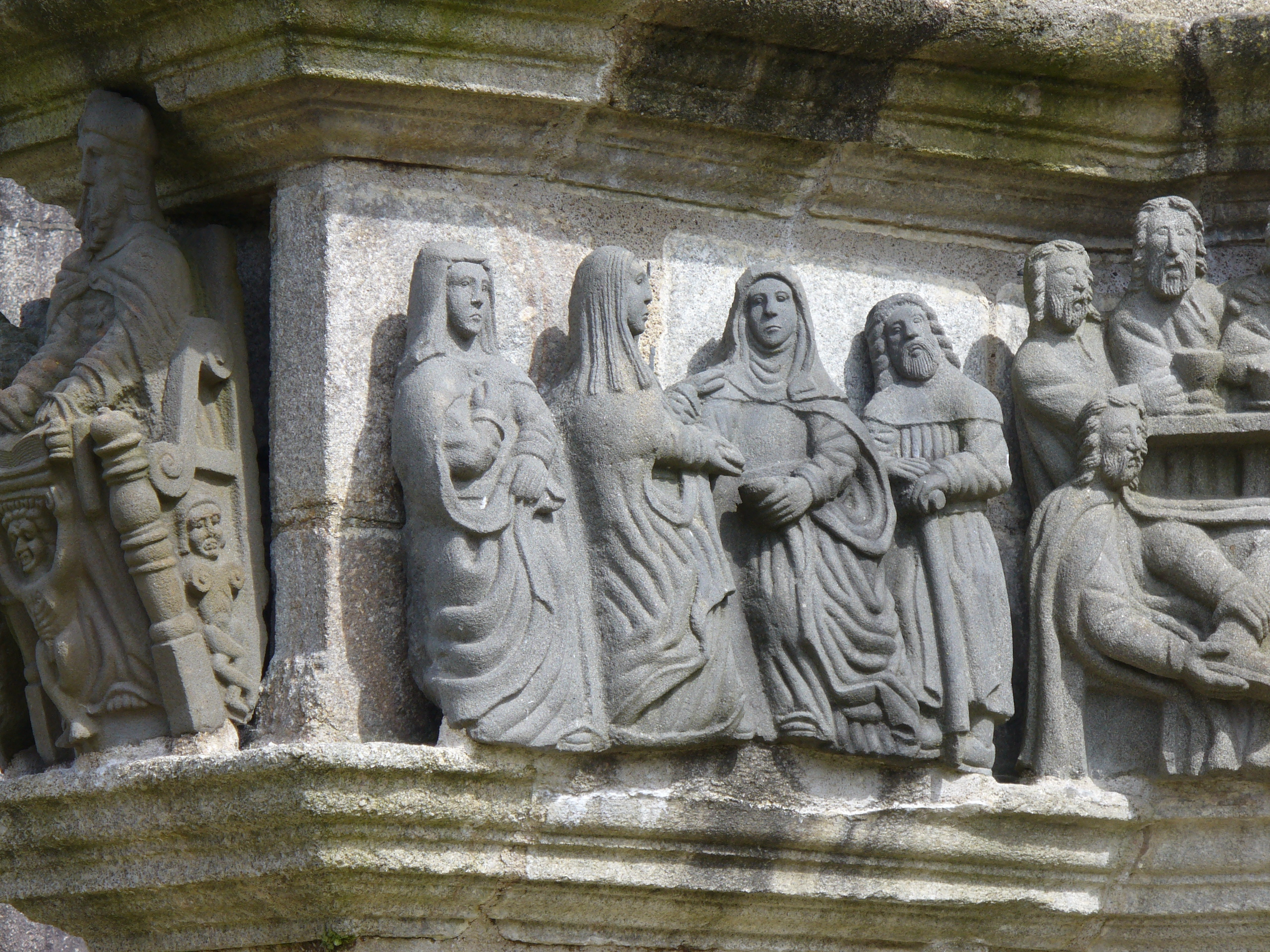
The visitation.

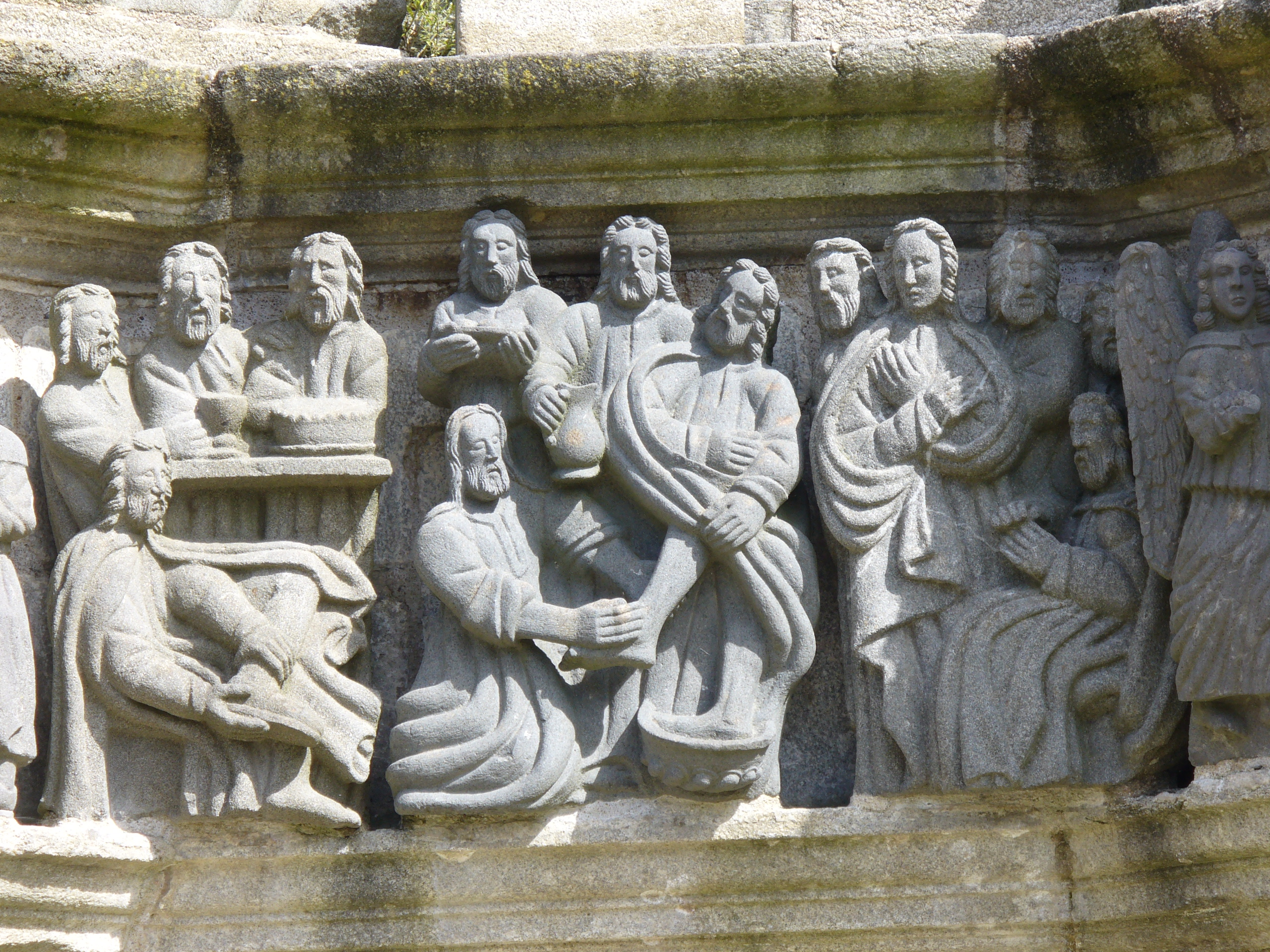
Jesus washing the disciples' feet.

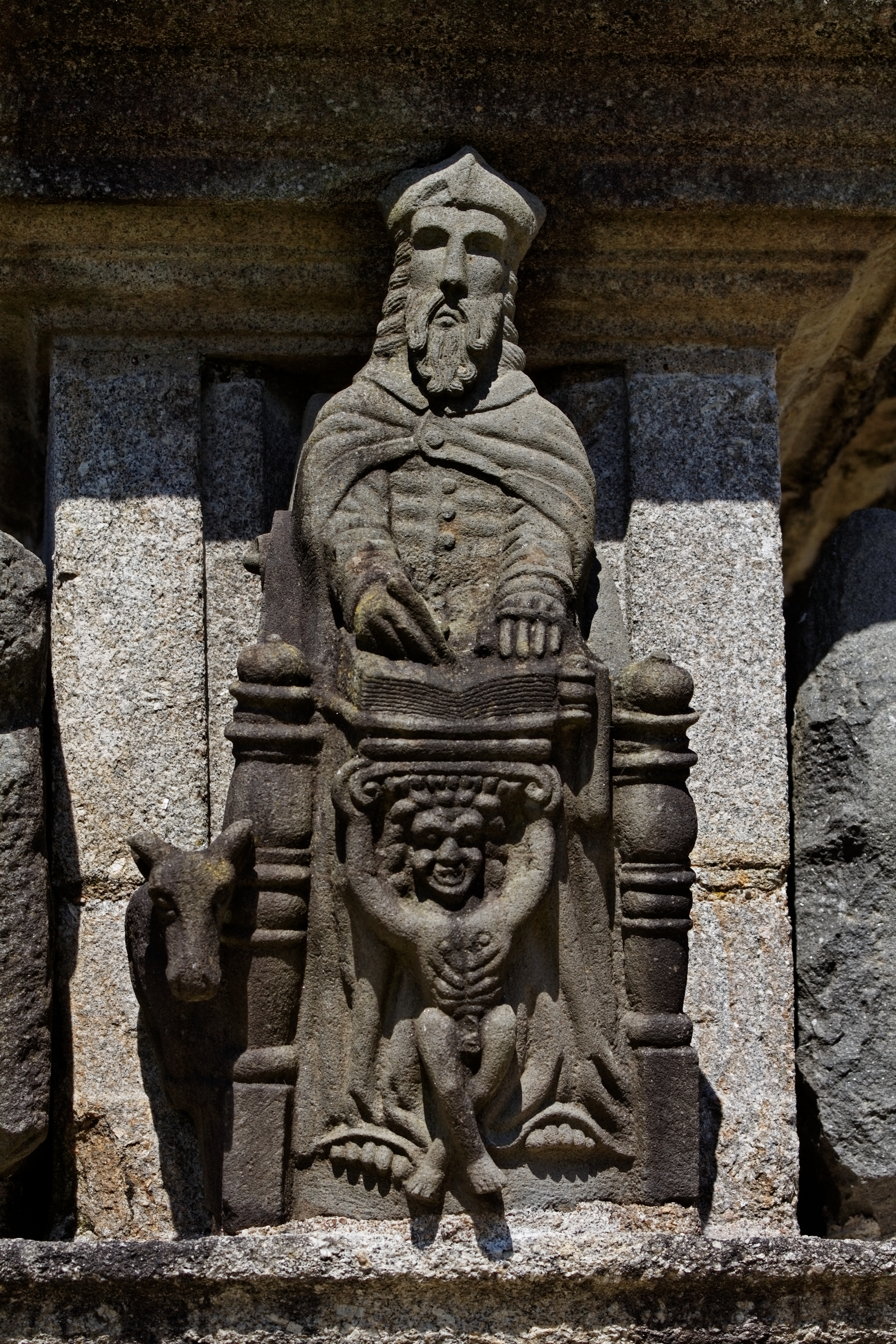
Another view of St Matthew and his attribute, a small boy.

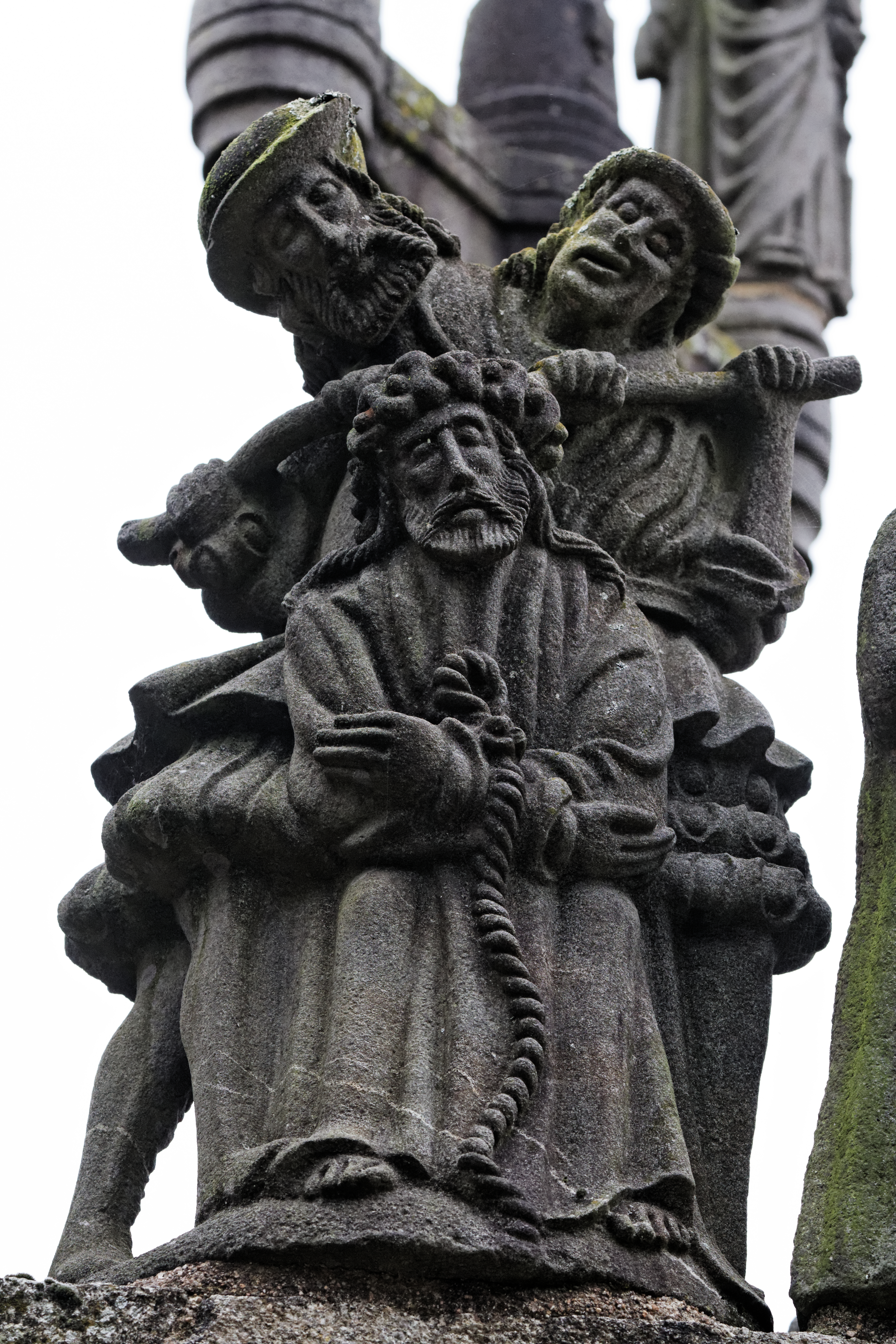
Two soldiers use a bar to press the crown of thorns into Jesus' head.

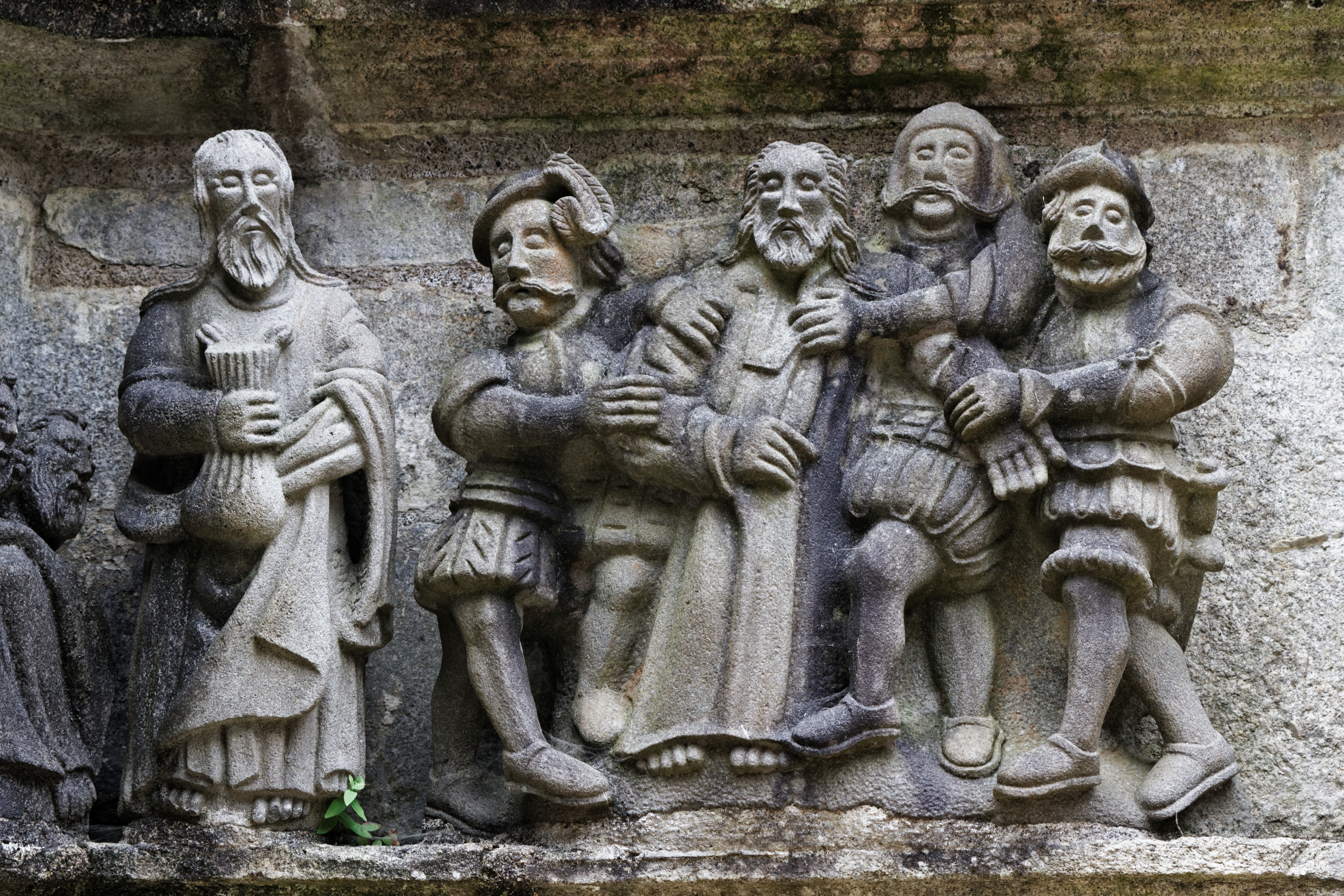
Jesus is arrested whilst Judas stands holding the purse.

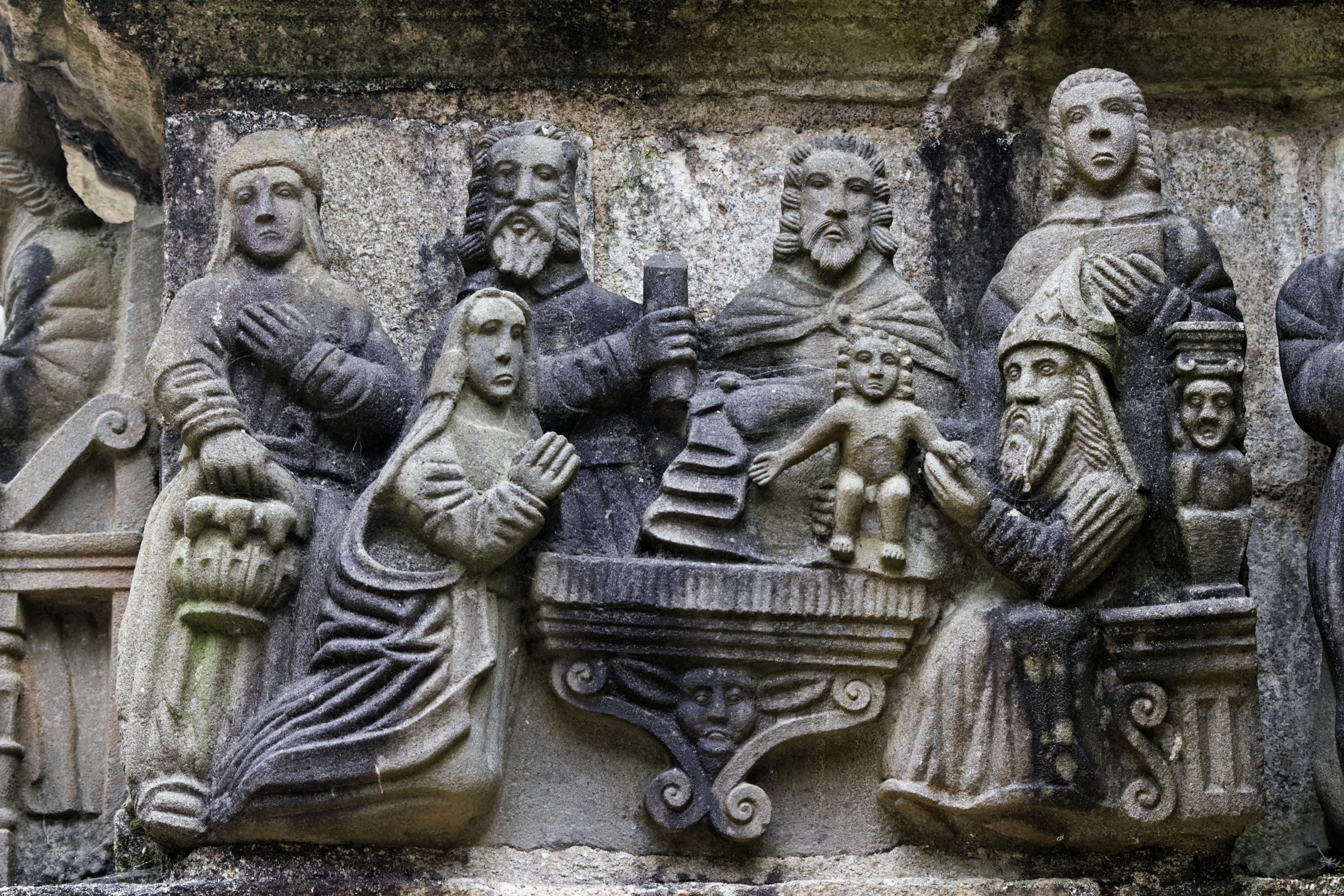
The circumcision

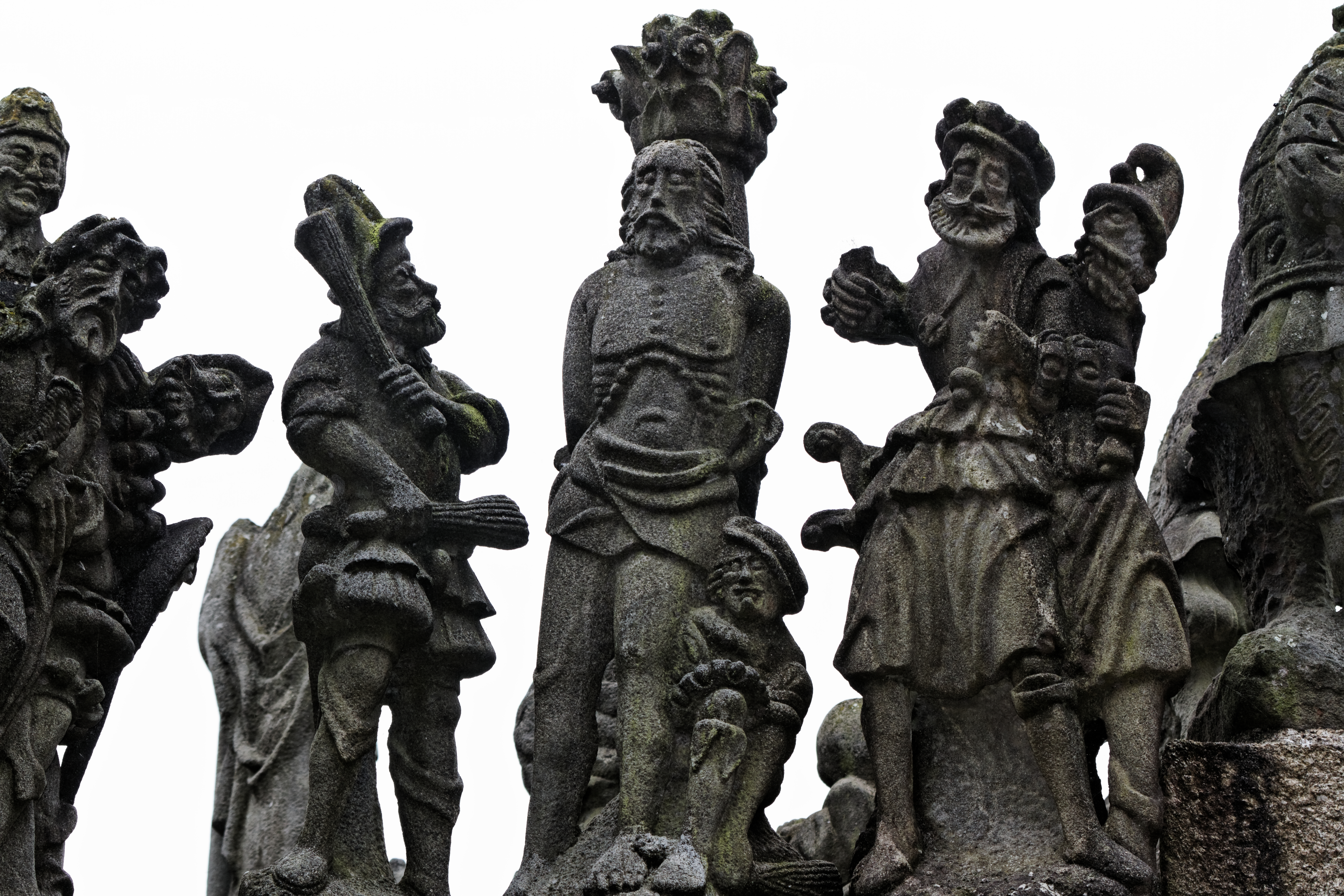
Jesus is tied to a column and mocked and ridiculed.

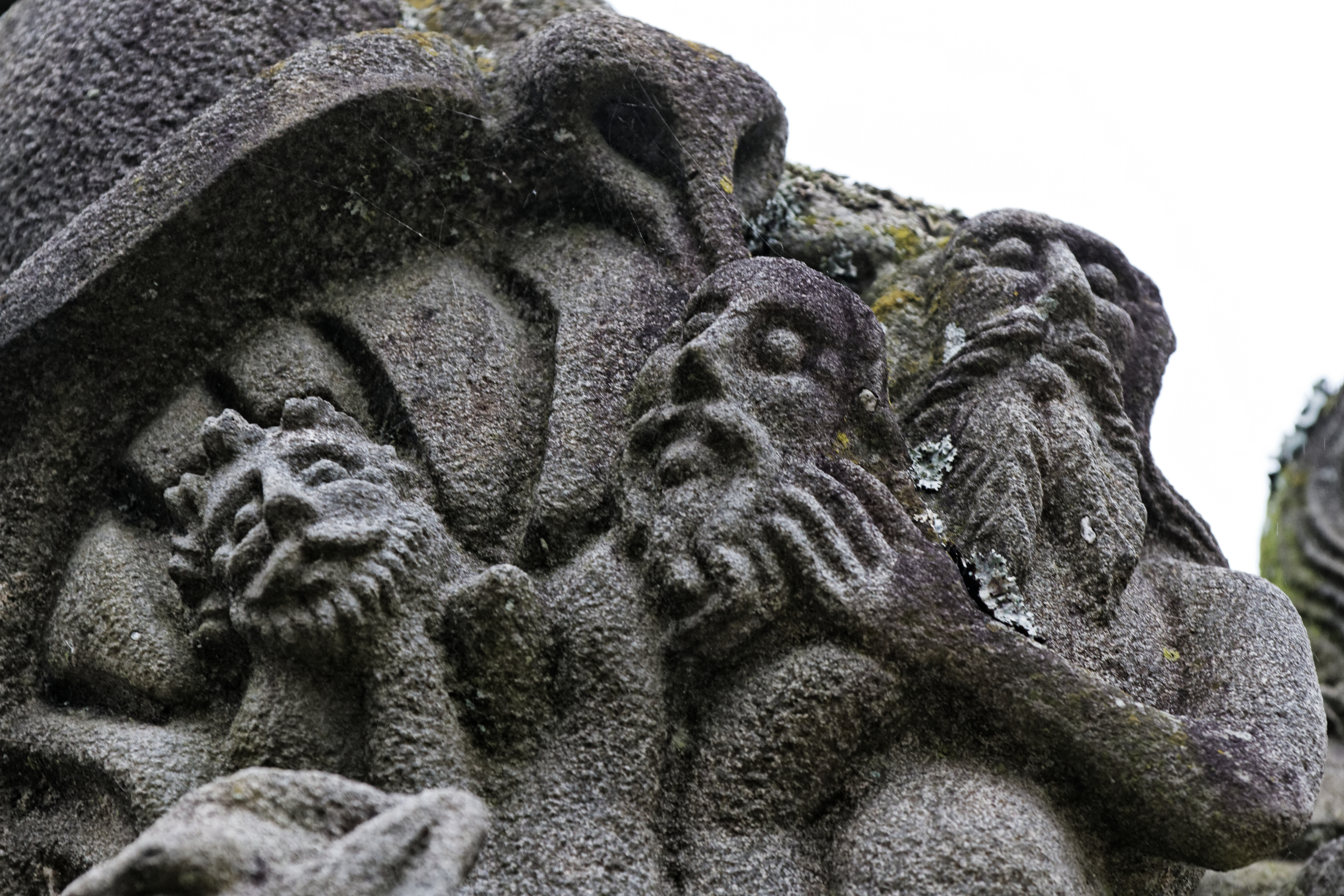
The mouth of Hell

== See also ==
- List of the works of the Maître de Guimiliau
- Guimiliau Parish close
