= Lampaul-Guimiliau Parish close =

Churchyard in Brittany, France

Coordinates: 48.4931°N 4.0403°W

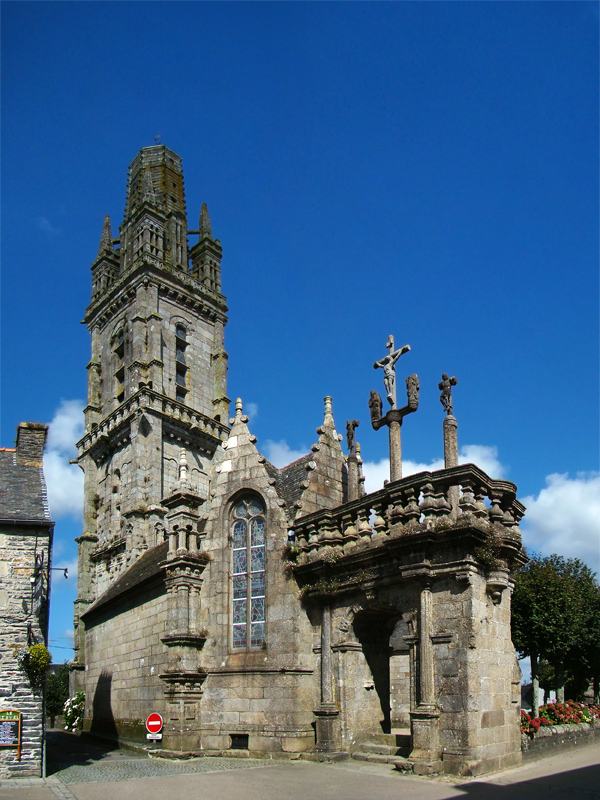
View of Notre-Dame church. Note the truncated tower and the triumphal arch that forms the entrance to the close

The Lampaul-Guimiliau Parish close (Enclos paroissial) is located at Lampaul-Guimiliau in the arrondissement of Morlaix in Brittany in north-western France. It is a monumental churchyard belonging to the Église Notre-Dame in that town. This church was built in the late 16th century to replace an older one. The structures in the parish close date to the 16th and 17th century. It is a listed historical monument since 1910.

== Calvary ==
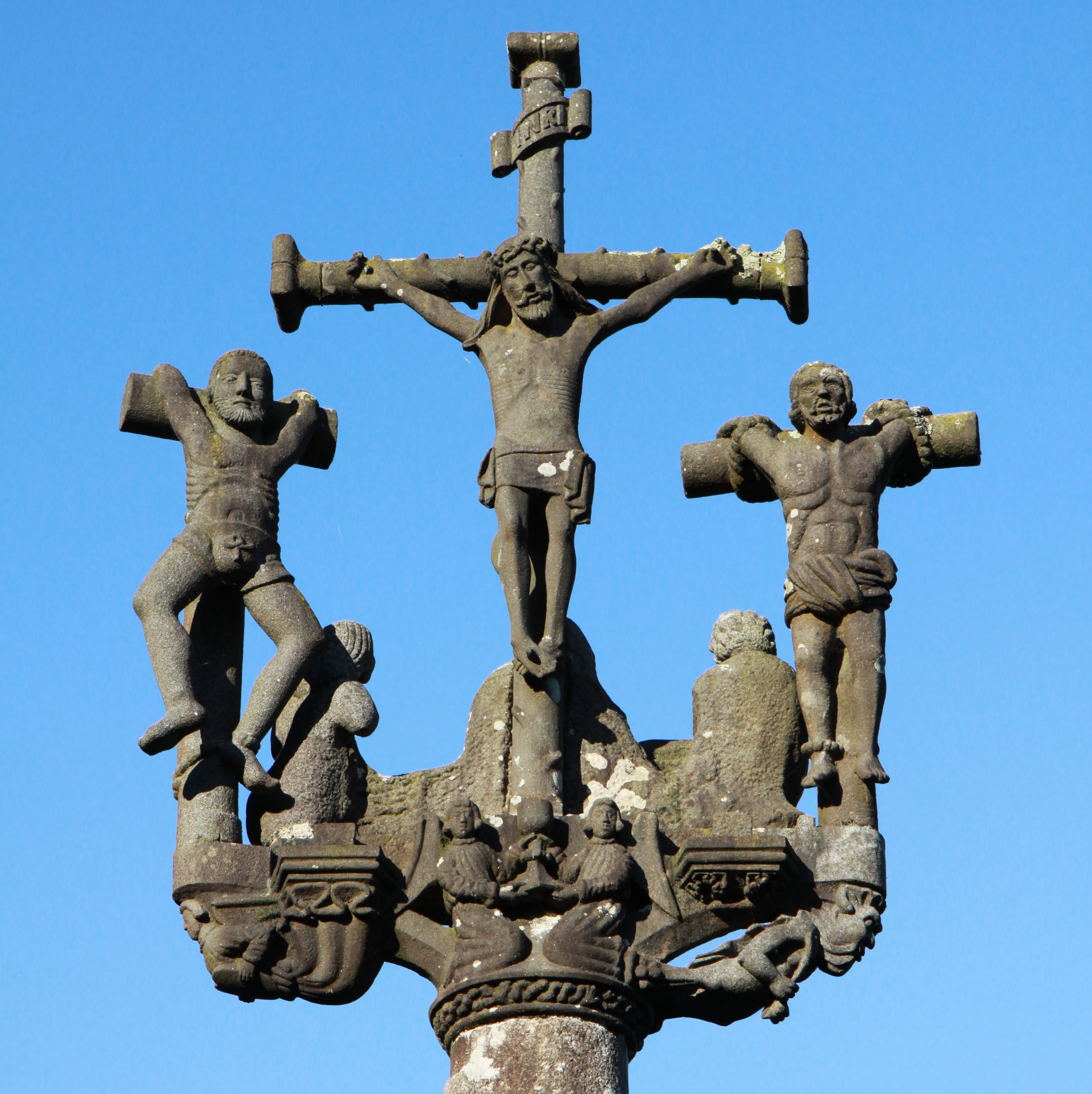
The calvary in the grounds of the Notre-Dame church at Lampaul-Guimiliau. Note the two angels gathering Jesus' blood in chalices. Under the bad robber on the right is a demon and an angel is carved under the good robber

The Lampaul-Guimiliau parish close boasts two calvaries. One, carved from kersanton stone, dates to the 16th century and is placed on top of the triumphal arch, the entrance to the enclosure, which dates to 1668 and comprises the central cross with gibbets on either side bearing the penitent thief and the impenitent thief. The central cross measures 4 metres in height. There is a statue of Mary Magdalene at the base of the cross and on the ornate crosspiece are back to back statues of Saint Peter and Saint John the Evangelist and Saint John with Saint Paul. The second calvary is 5.5 metres high and comprises a single shaft at the top of which is a Jesus is crucified with the two thieves on gibbets on either side. On the reverse of Jesus is a pièta, sadly much mutilated, although it was restored in 1993. Below Jesus are two small angels holding a chalice in which they have collected his Blood and under the bad thief there is a depiction of a demon ready to whisk his soul off to hell. Beneath the good thief, the depiction of an angel promises his soul a better fate.

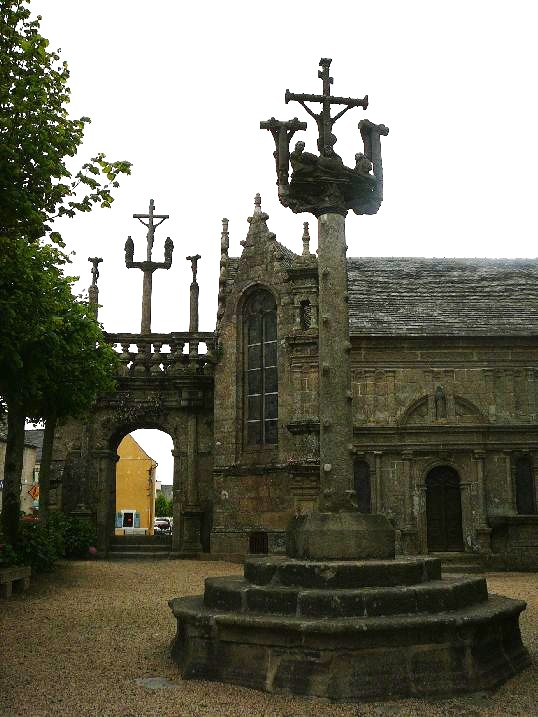
A view of the ossuary and the two calvaries at Lampaul-Guimiliau. We see the calvary on the arc de triomphe and the second calvary placed in the churchyard in front of the ossuary

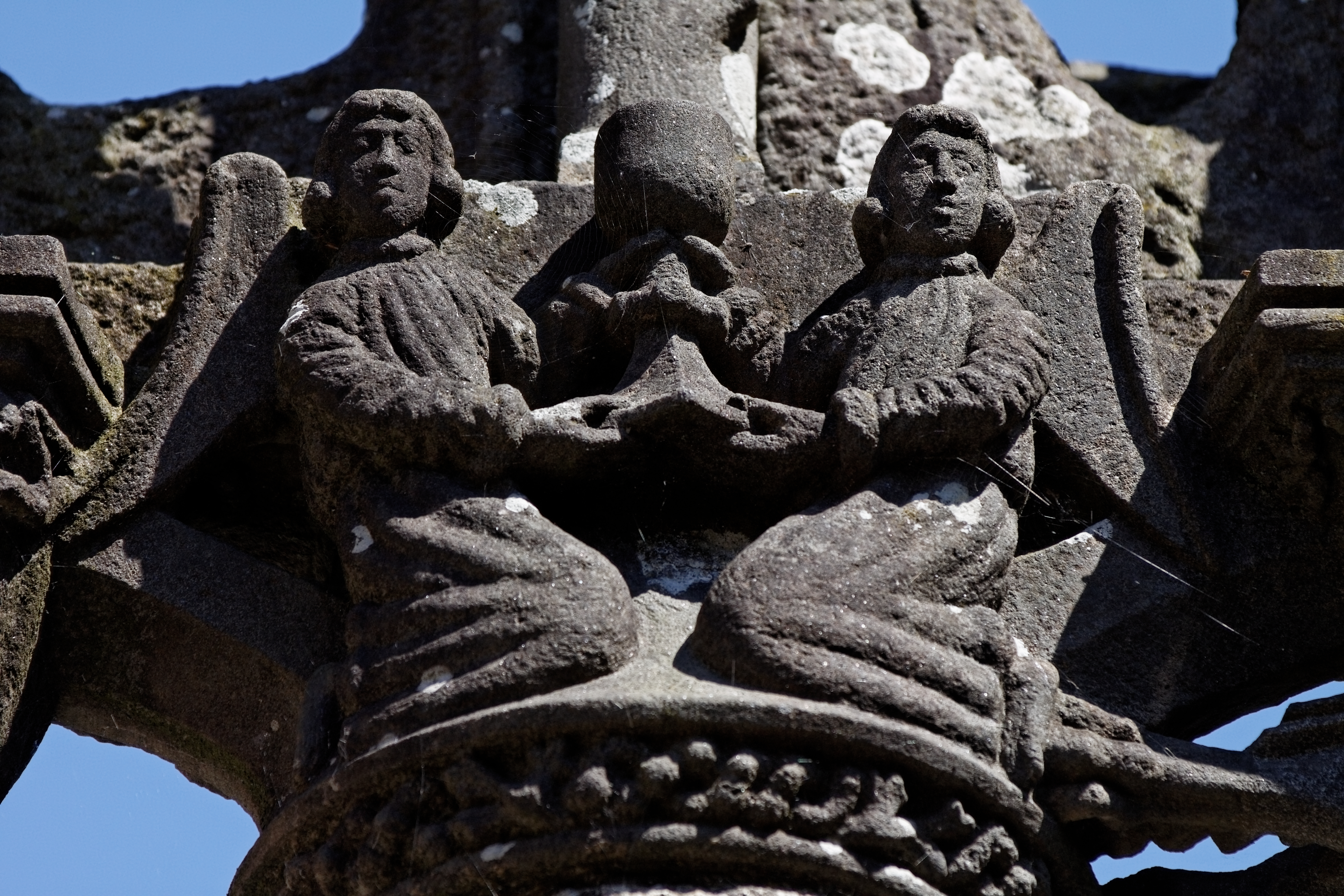
Two angels have collected Jesus' blood in a chalice. Part of the Lampaul-Guimiliau calvary

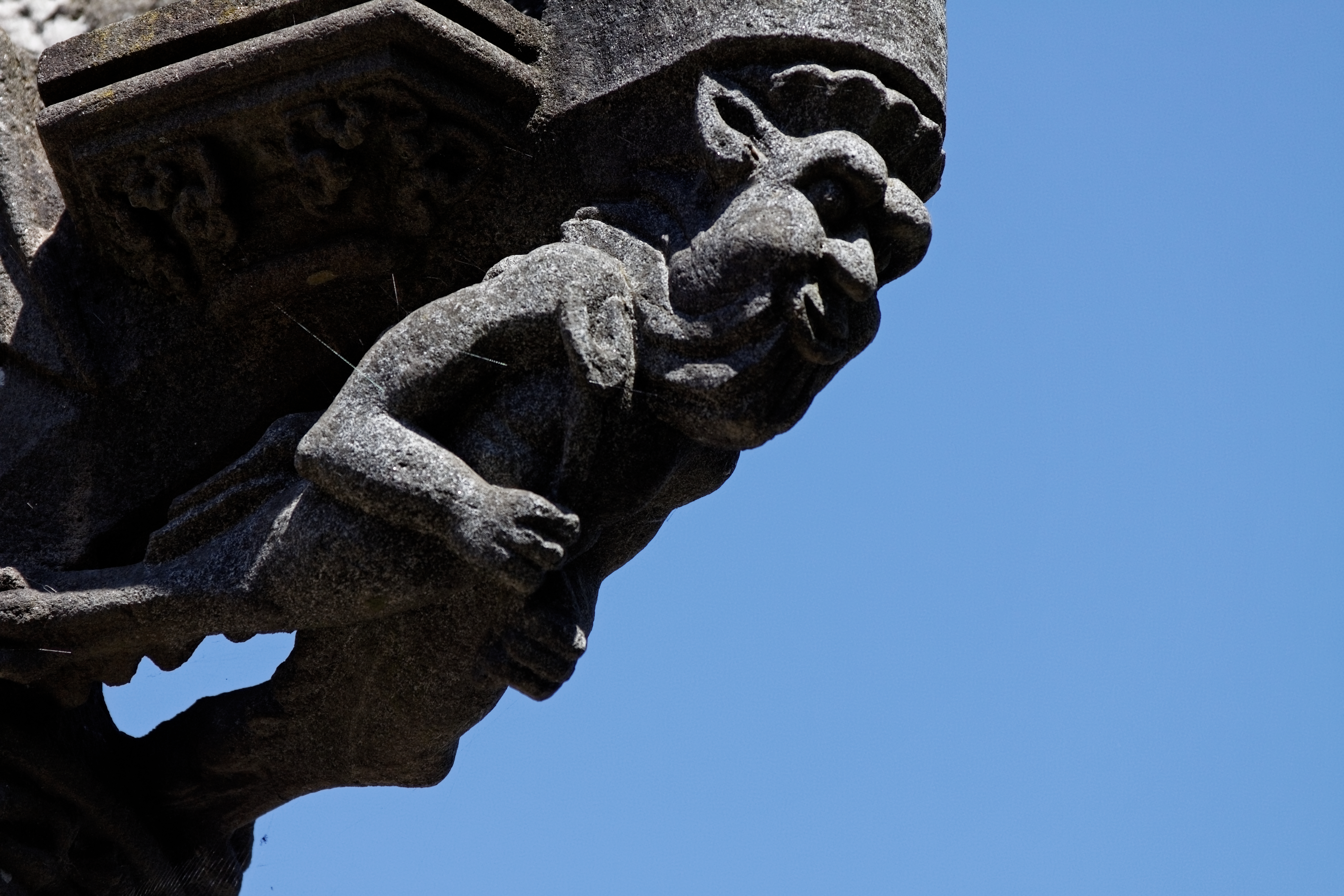
A demon under the bad robber waits to whisk his soul to hell. Part of the Lampaul-Guimiliau calvary

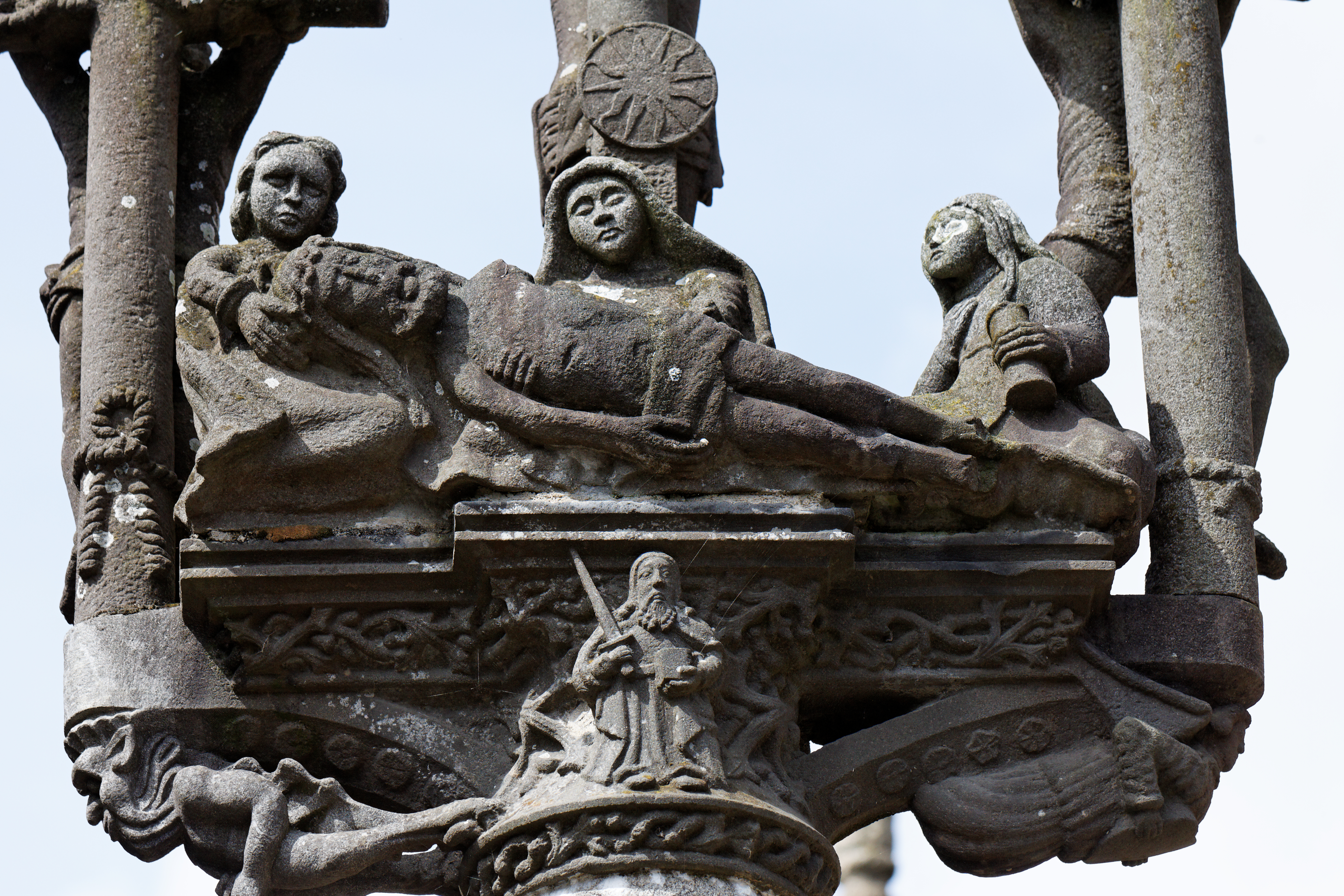
The pièta on the calvary at Lampaul-Guimiliau

== Ossuary ==
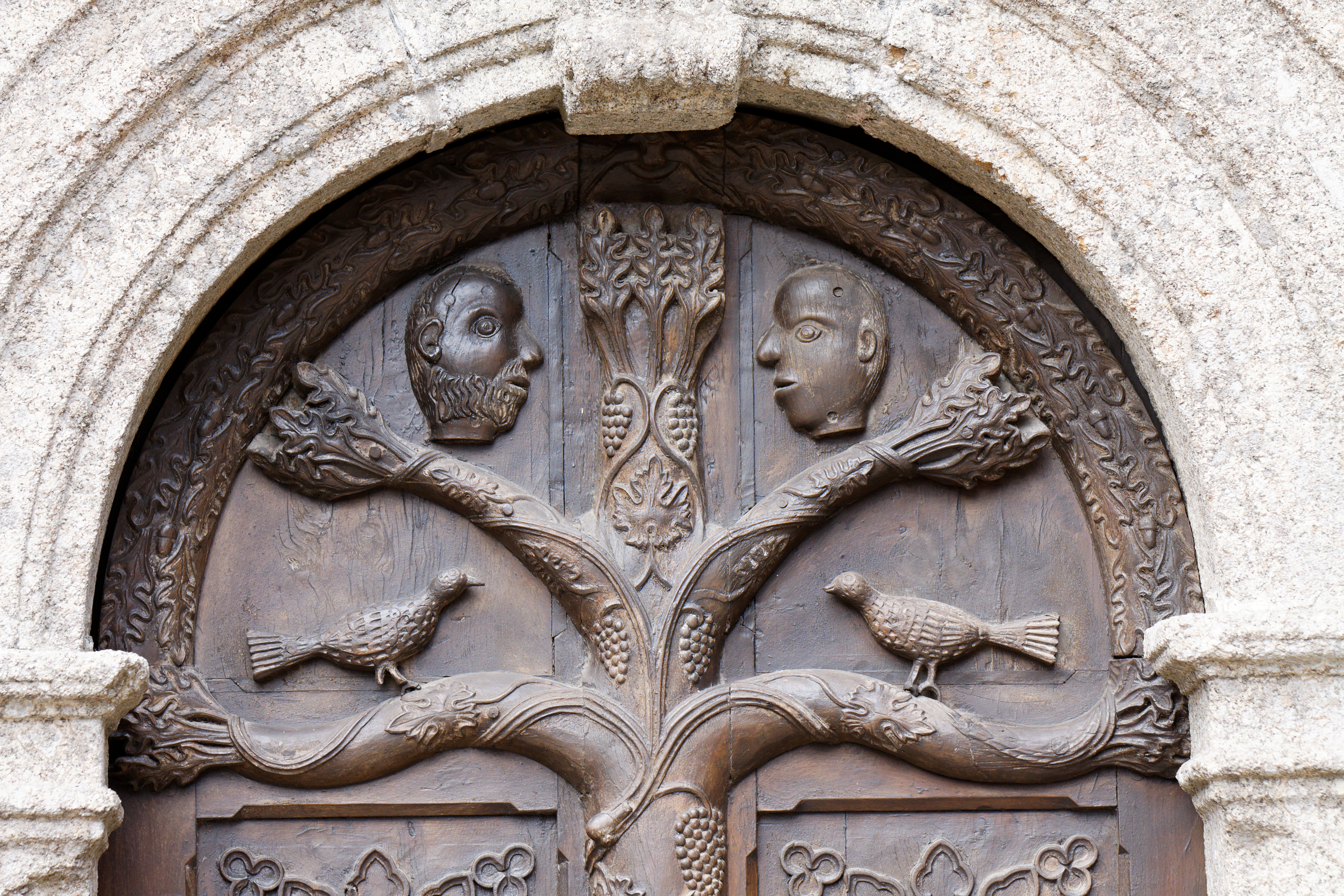
Carving of the "Tree of Life" on the ossuary door

This building dates to 1667 and is attributed to G. Kerlezroux. The motto "Memento mori" is written above the ossuary door, contrasting with the fine carving of the Tree of life on the door itself; the sculptor juxtaposed images of life and death. Inside the ossuary there is an altarpiece depicting the resurrection with a depiction of the "Risen Lord" with Saint Sebastian to the left and Saint Roch on the right. Also to the left of the altarpiece are statues of Saint Anne and the Virgin Mary and on the right a statue of Saint Pol and the dragon. The "Mise au Tombeau" or Burial of Jesus, shown in the photographs which appear later, was originally in the ossuary, but was subsequently moved to the church. Above the door there is also a sculpture of a man's head: he gingerly strokes his beard. Thus in its overall imagery, the ossuary deals not just with death but life and resurrection.

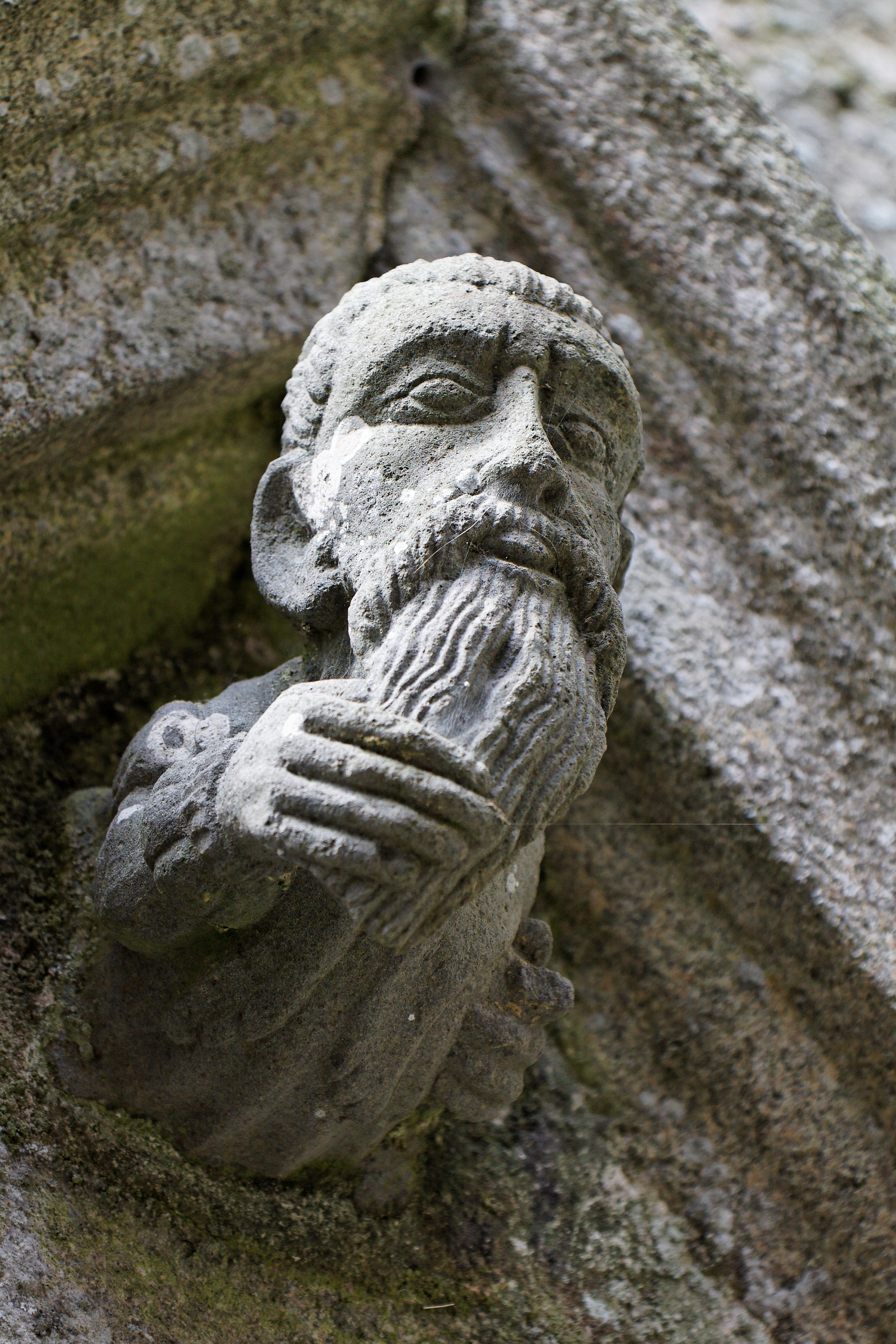
Carving on ossuary. A man strokes his beard

== Porch ==
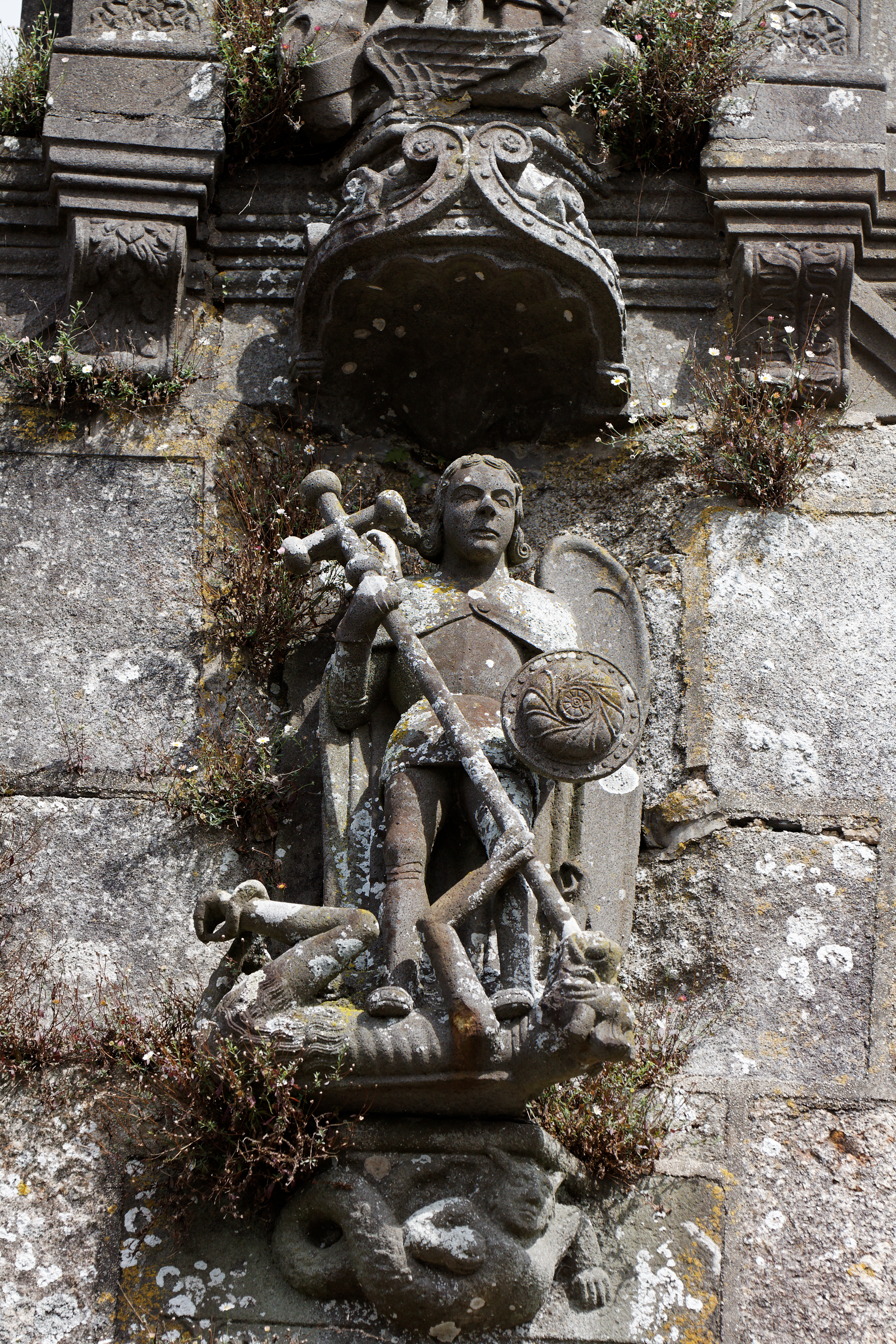
Saint Michael fights the dragon. Sculpture by Bastien Prigent on the south porch exterior at Lampaul-Guimiliau. Beneath the statue is a carving depicting a half demon/half fish creature

This large Gothic porch dates to 1533. At the very top are statues of the Virgin Mary, John the Evangelist and a small angel, these above a niche containing a statue of Saint Pol (Paul Aurelian). Beneath this is a sculpture depicting Saint Michael slaying the dragon. In the porch interior there are statues in Kersanton stone depicting the twelve apostles. On the east side are Saints Peter, Thomas, Judas, John, James the Greater and James the Lesser. On the west side are Saints Andrew, Phillip, Bartholomew, Matthew, Mathias and Simon. The sculptures depicting Saint Pol and Saint Michael are attributed to Bastien Prigent and those of the Virgin Mary, John the Evangelist and the angel are by Henry Prigent. The porch leads to a double doored entrance to the church. A statue of the Virgin Mary with child is placed over the doors. The porch also contains a stoup. The porch would have provided an area for merchants to hold discussions.

== Bell tower ==
The bell tower was built in 1573 and was one of the highest in Finistère. However, it was hit by lightning in 1809, its spire being destroyed. The date 1609 is carved above the door and on the south wall the date 1622 has been inscribed. The chevet dates to 1827 and is decorated with lanterons.

== Sacristy ==
This was added to the church in 1679. It served as a meeting place for local manufacturers and the parish's treasury. It has some remarkable carved paneling.

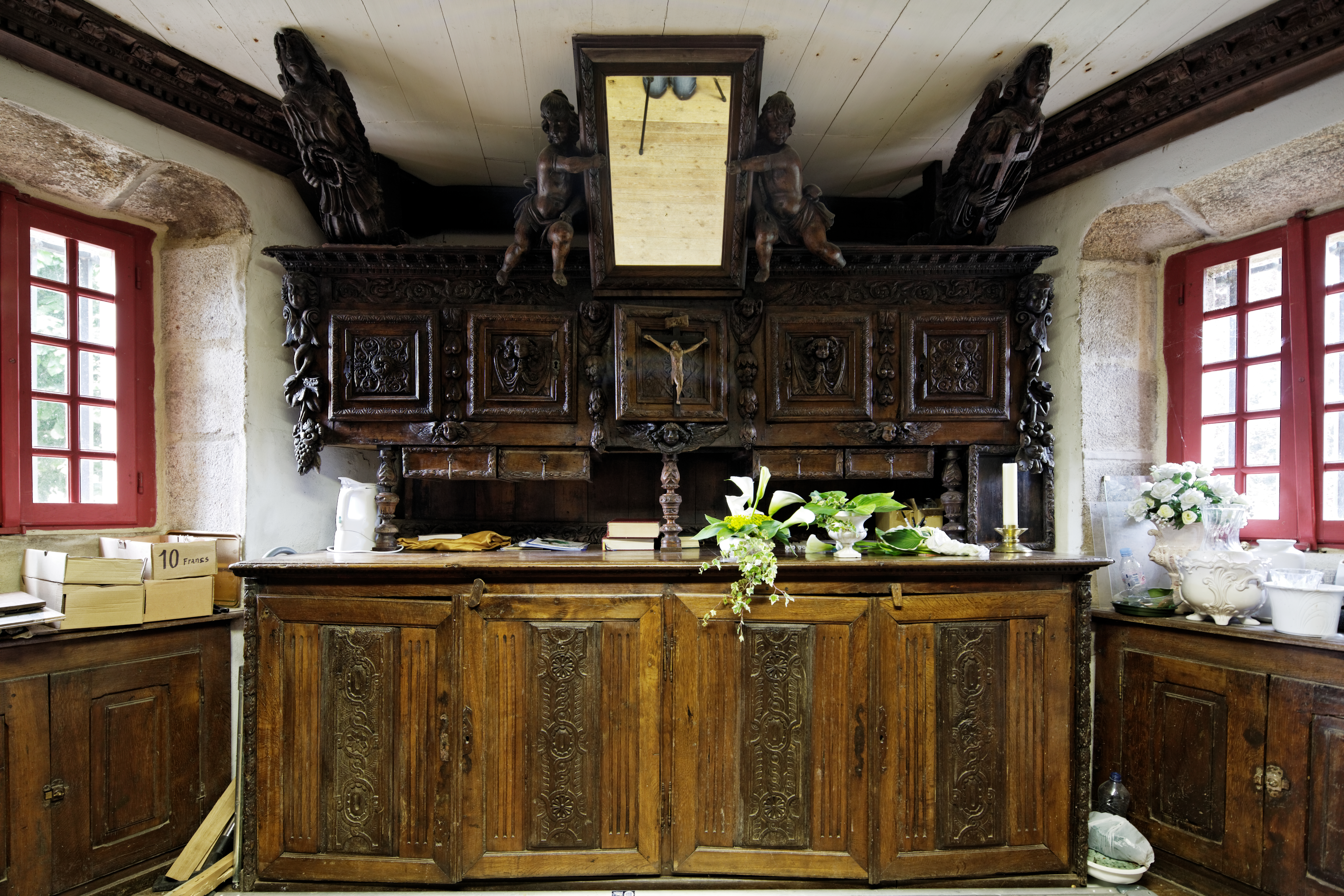
View of the sacristy

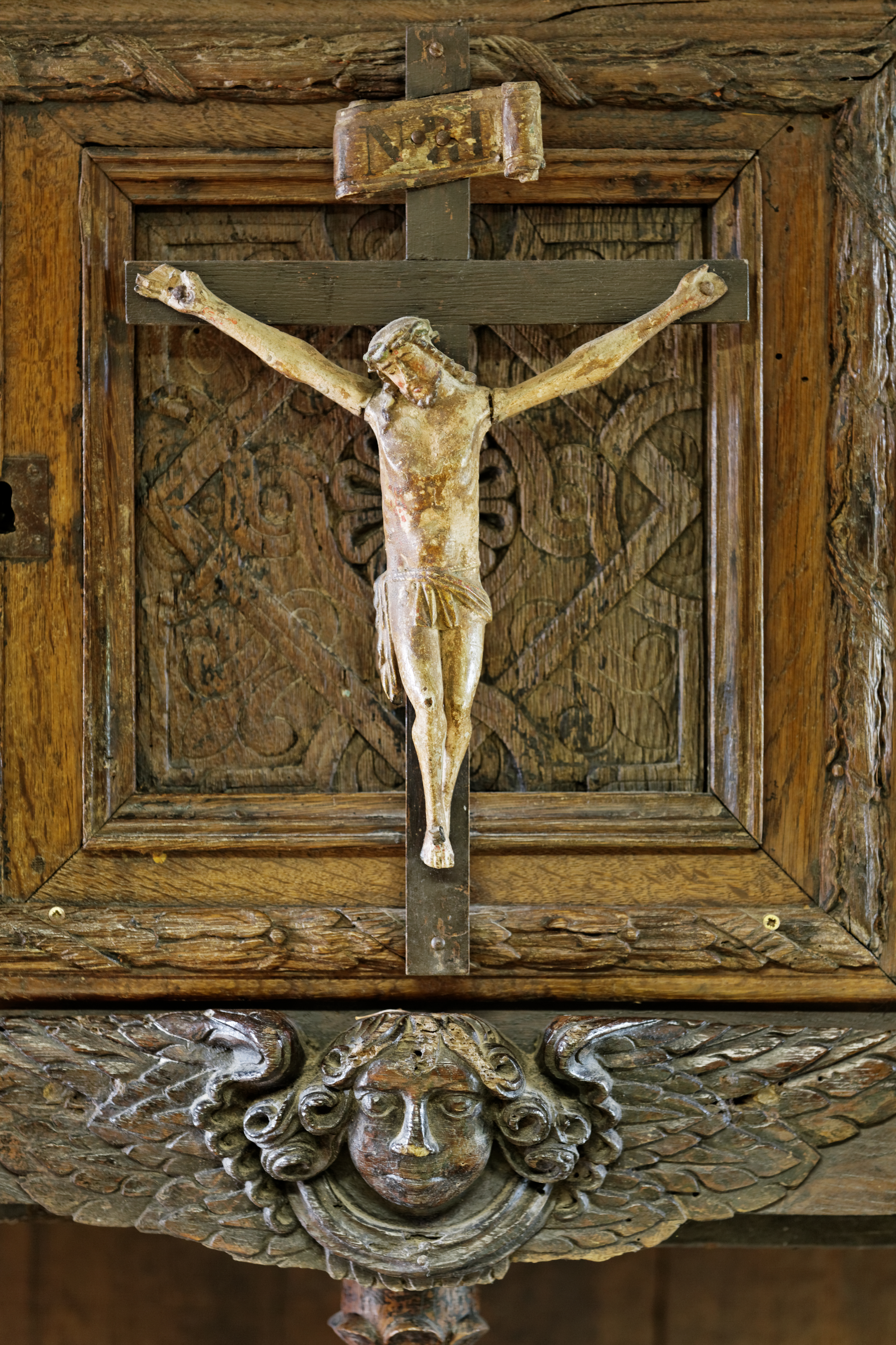
Detail in the sacristy paneling

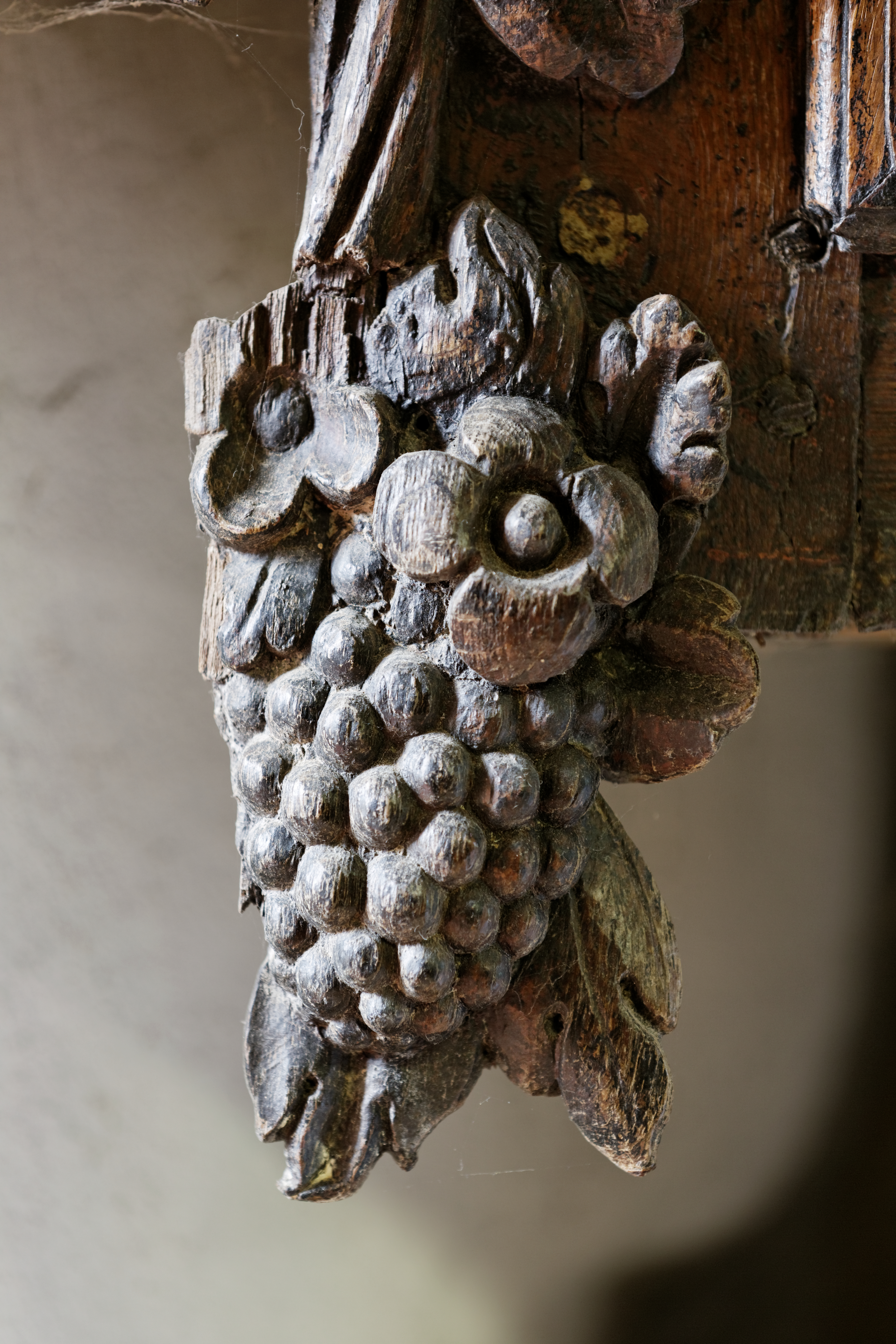
Carving in the sacristy

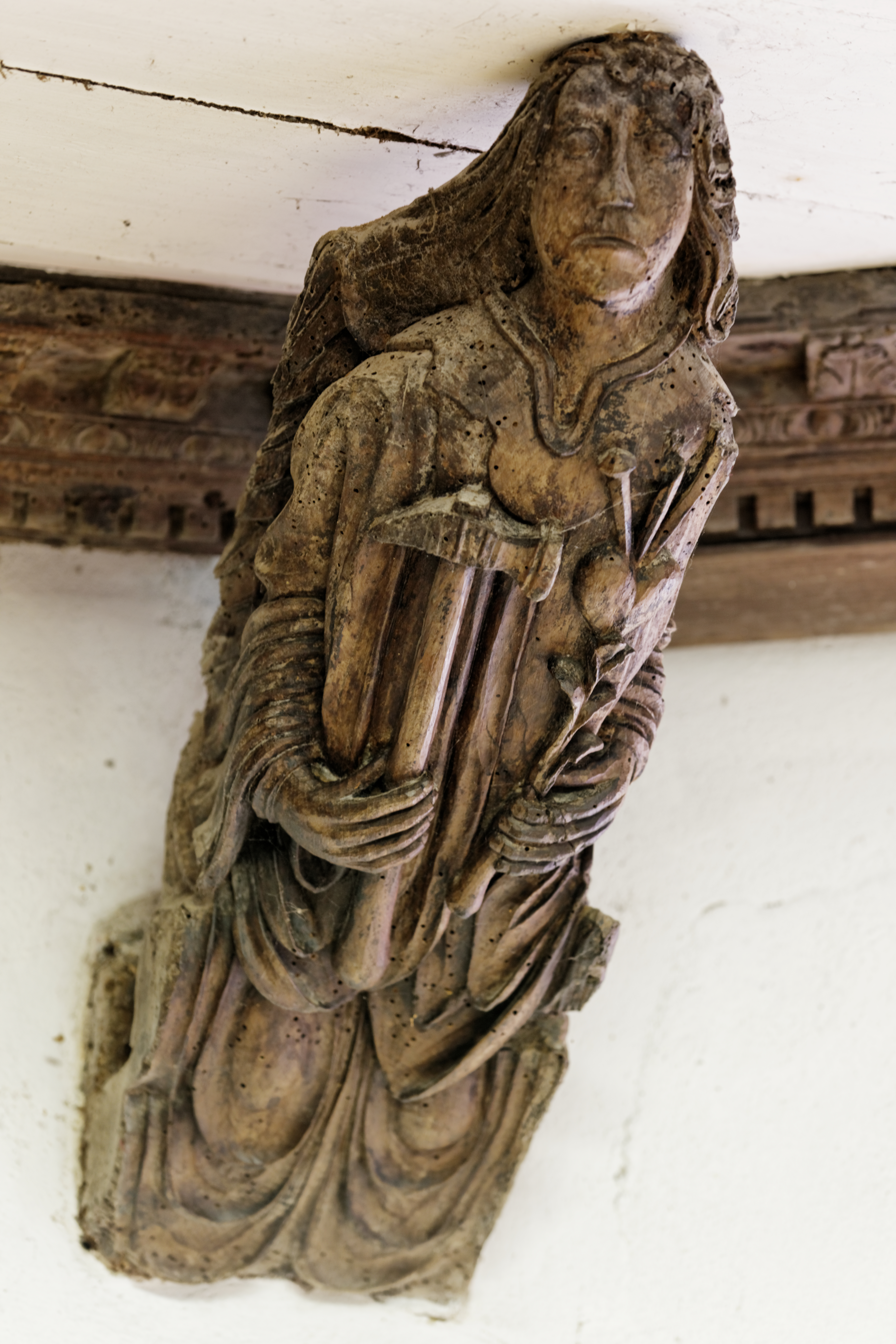
Carving in the sacristy

== Rood screen ==
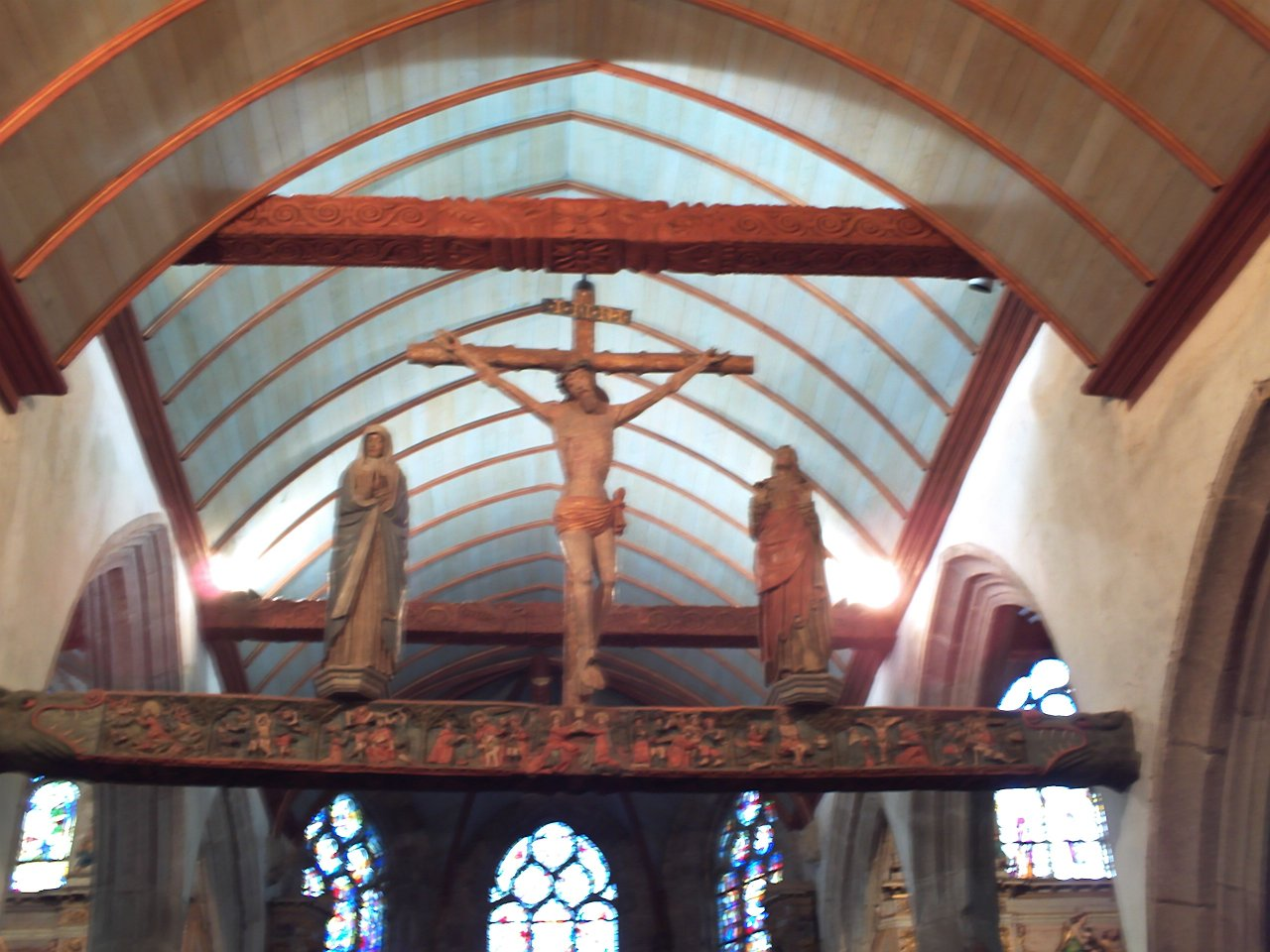
View of rood screen. Note the bas-relief carvings along the supporting beam

There is a 16th-century Rood screen ("Poutre de Gloire") with carvings depicting Christ on the cross with the Virgin Mary and John the Evangelist in attendance and bas-reliefs covering various scenes from the passion carved on the main cross beam; Christ's agony in the Garden of Gethsemane, the flagellation, the crowning with thorns, the " Ecce homo", angels with chalices to collect Jesus' blood, Jesus carrying the cross, Jesus disrobed, the crucifixion and the descent from the cross. On the choir side of the screen are further bas-reliefs depicting the Annunciation and the twelve Sybils announcing the coming of a "saviour".

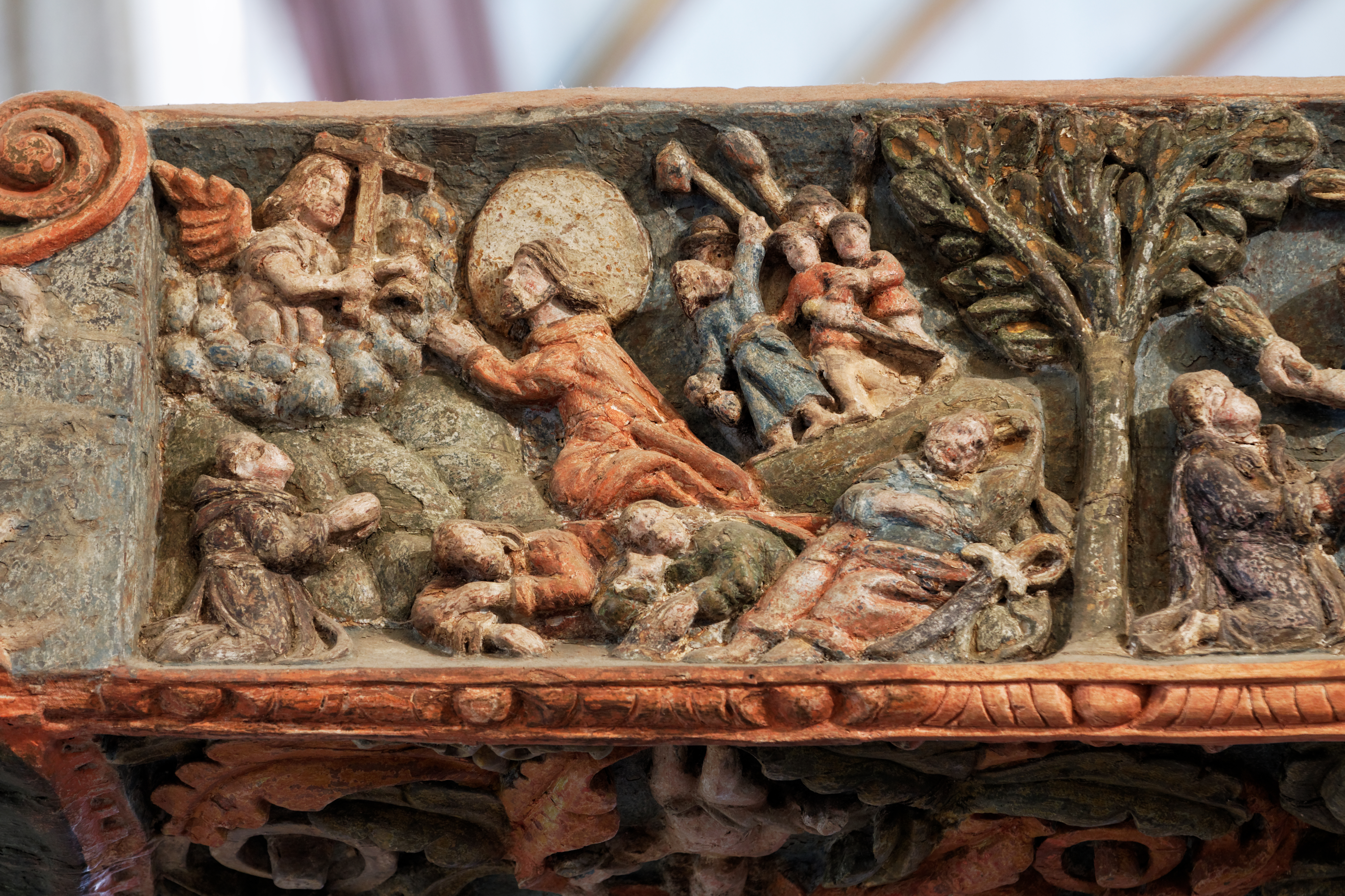
One of the bas-reliefs carved on the rood screen beam: Christ in fervent prayer in the Garden of Gethsemane

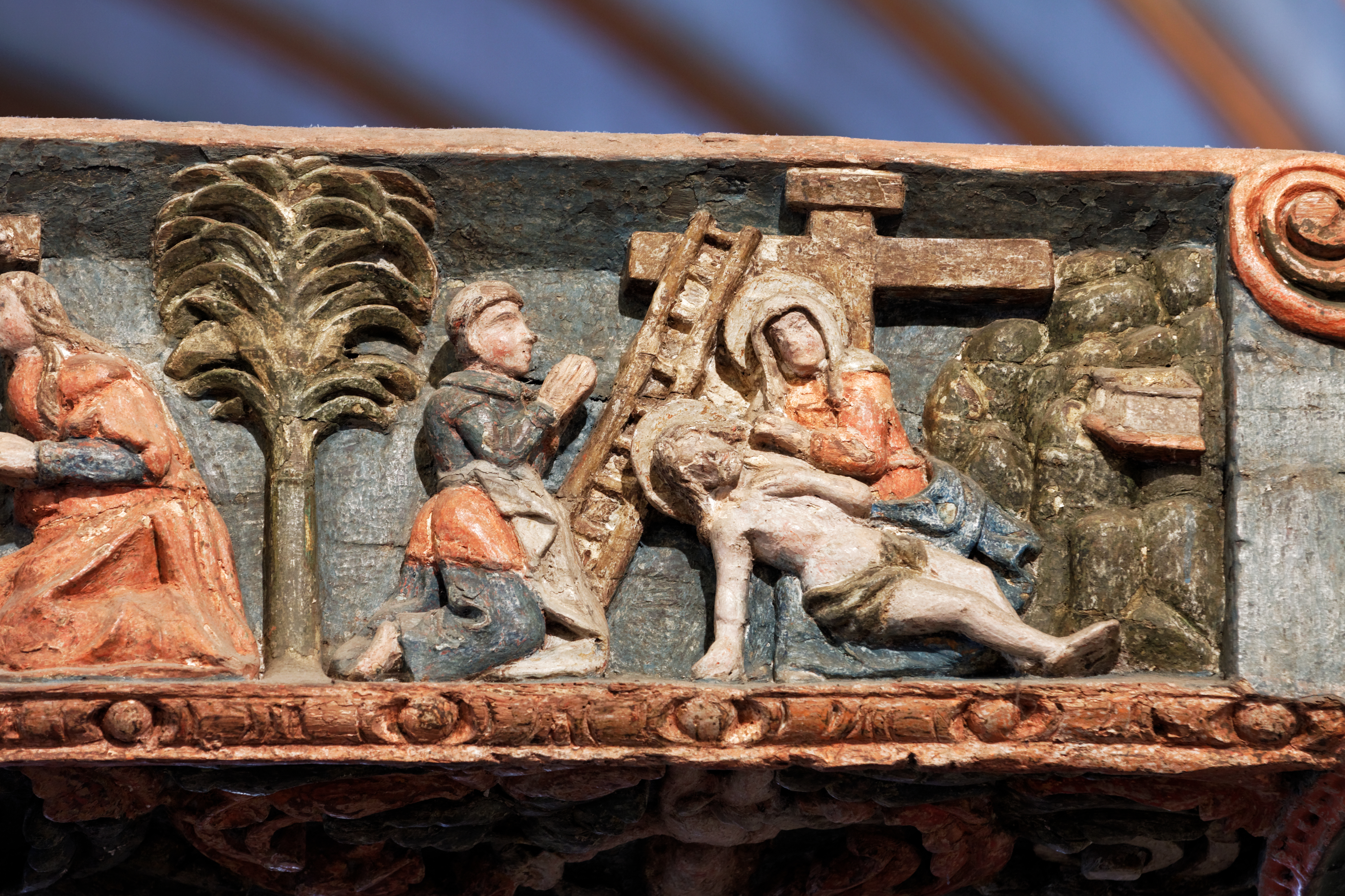
One of the bas-reliefs carved on the rood screen beam: Christ is brought down from the cross

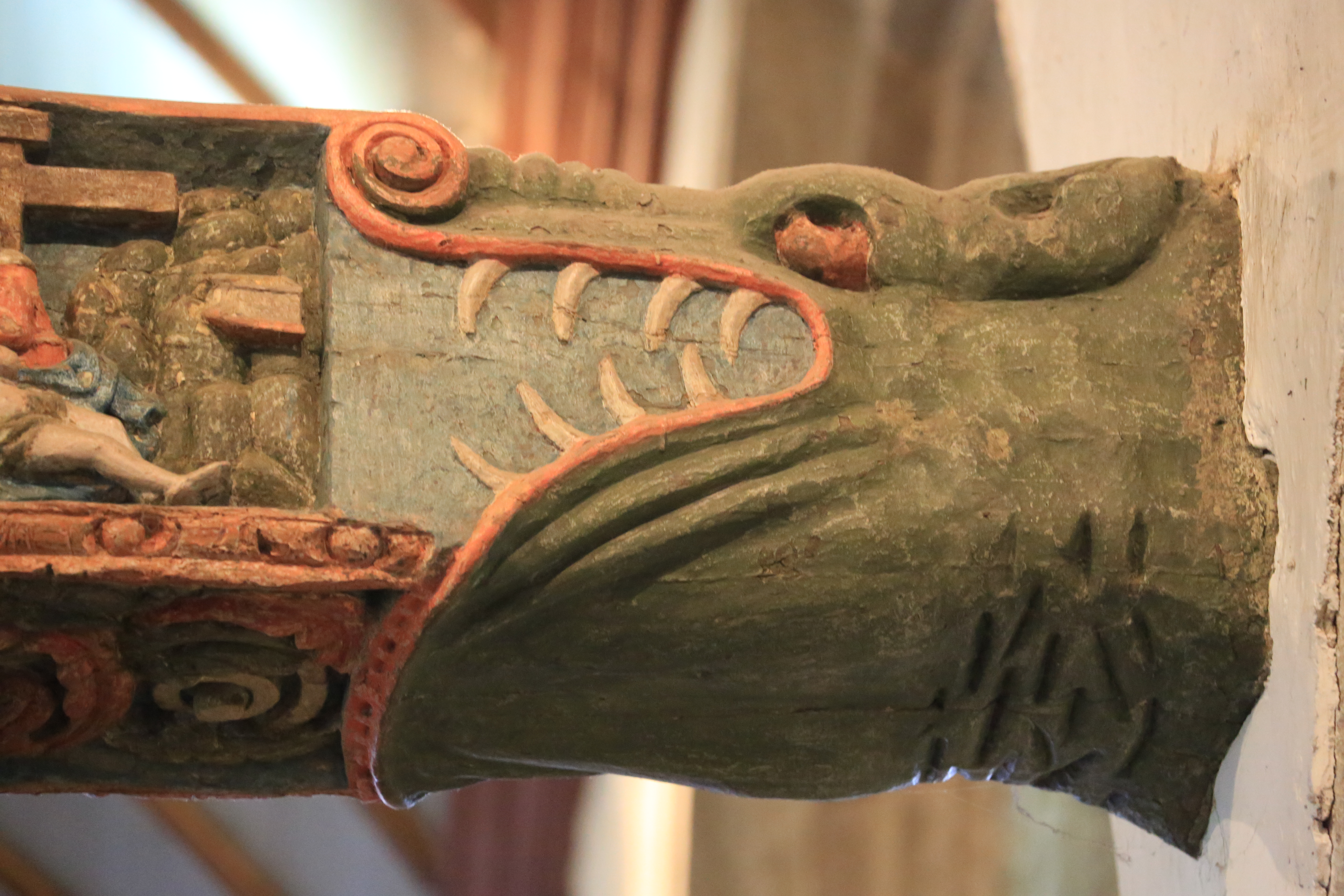
Carving at the end of the rood screen beam

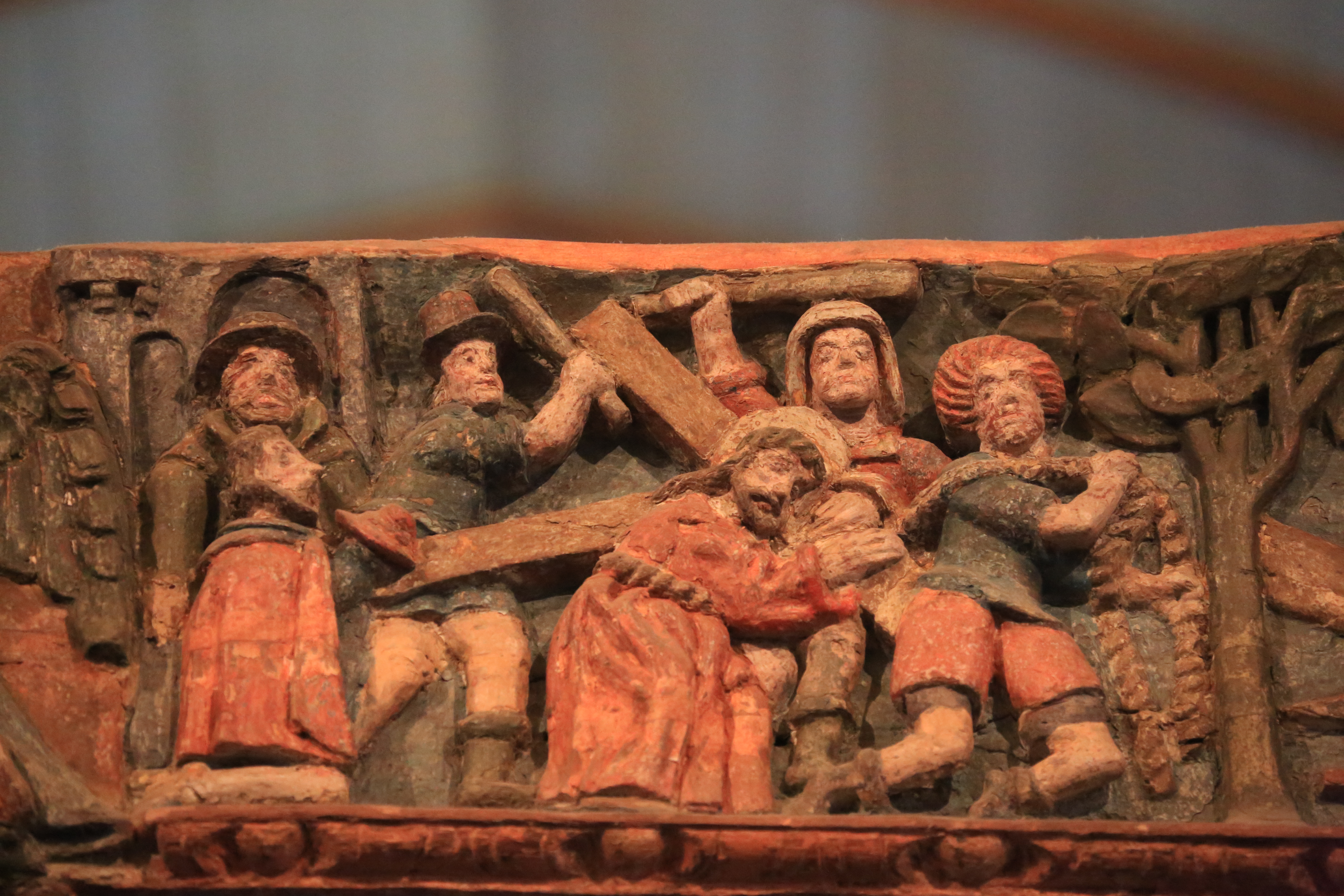
One of the bas-reliefs carved on the rood screen beam: Jesus carrying the cross

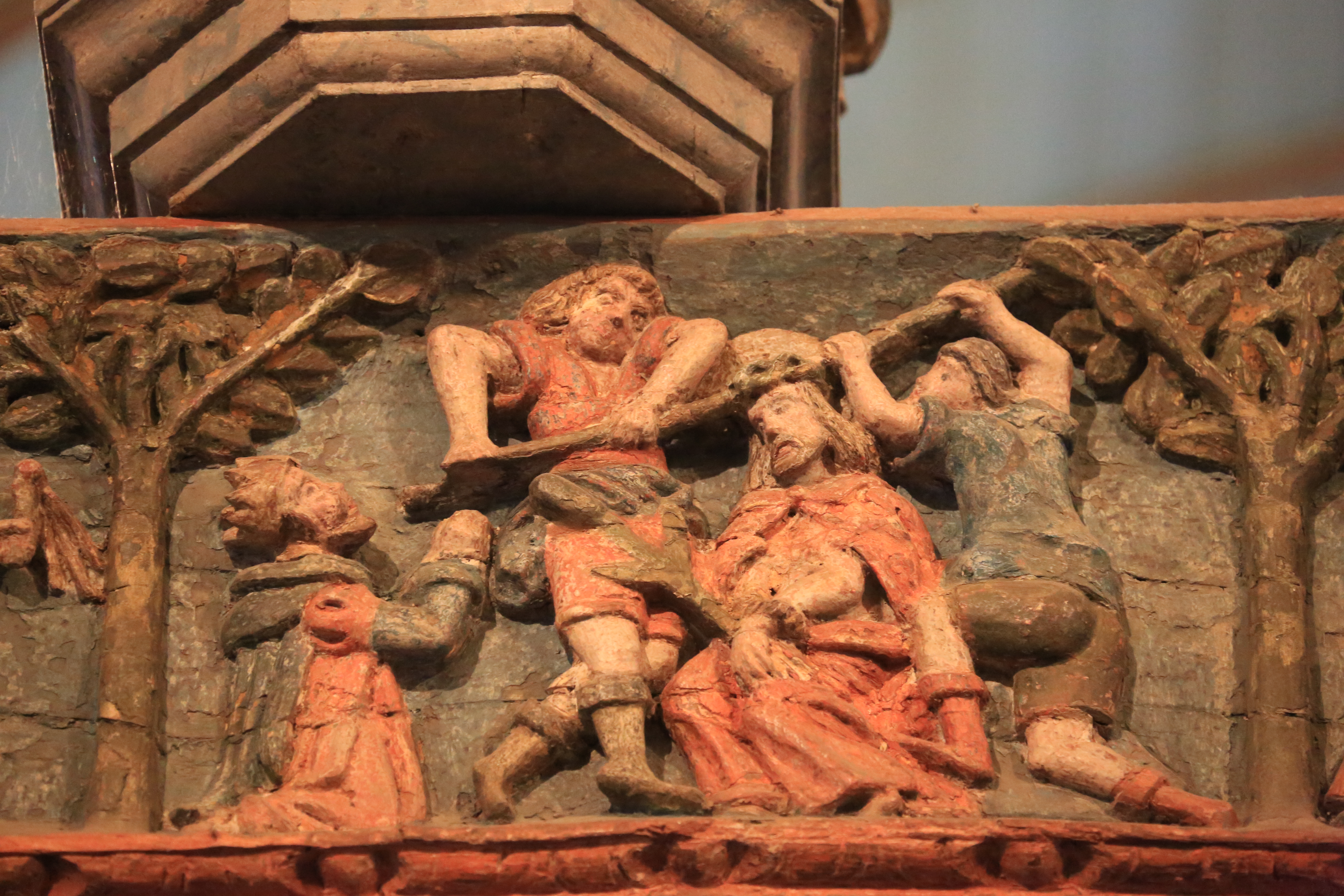
One of the bas-reliefs carved on the rood screen beam: The crown of thorns is forced down on Jesus' head

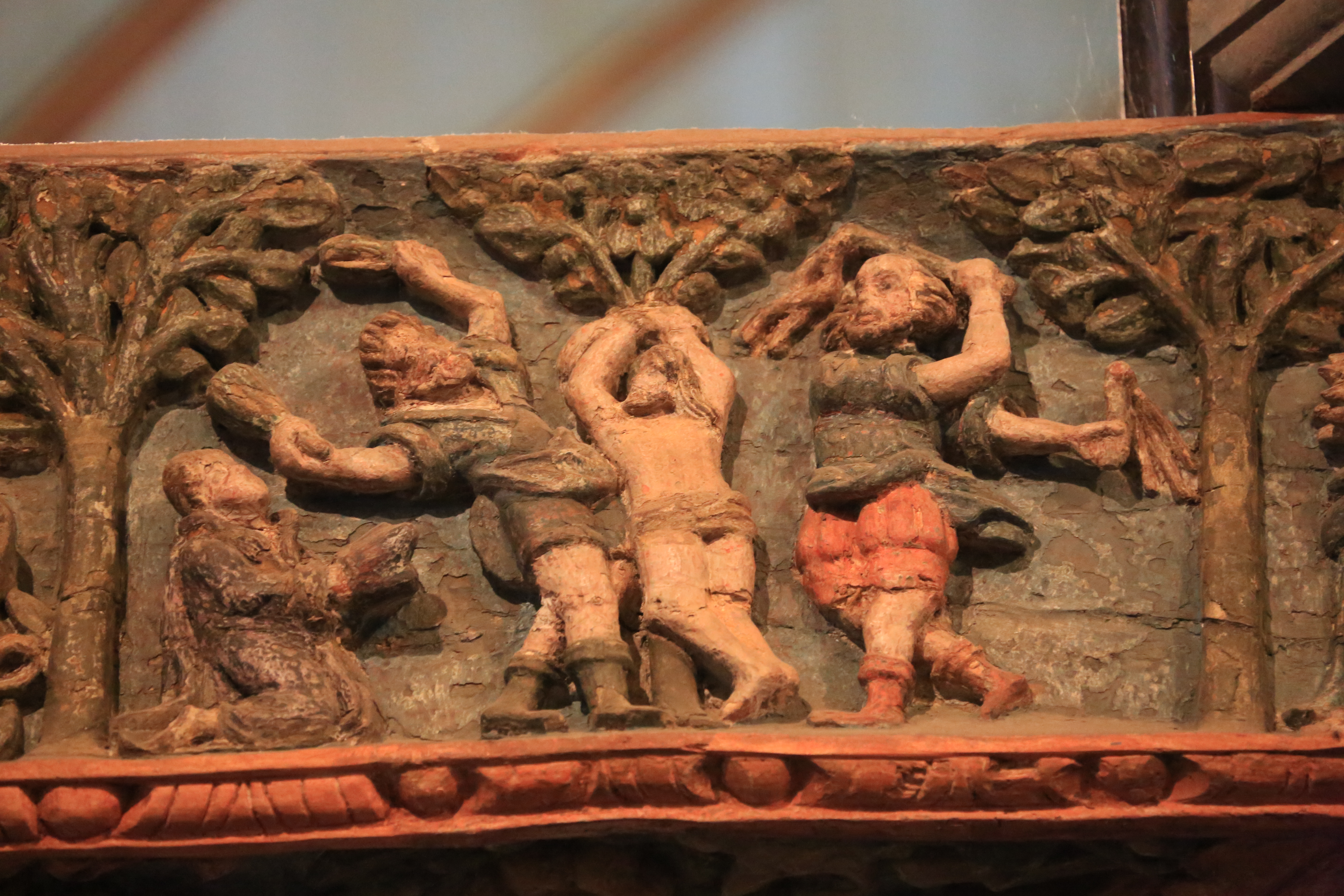
One of the bas-reliefs carved on the rood screen beam: Jesus is flogged

== Pulpit ==
This dates to 1759-1760 and is decorated with images of the four Evangelists and the four "Doctors of the church"; Saints Augustine, Jerome, Ambrose and Gregory the Great. See Doctor of the Church.

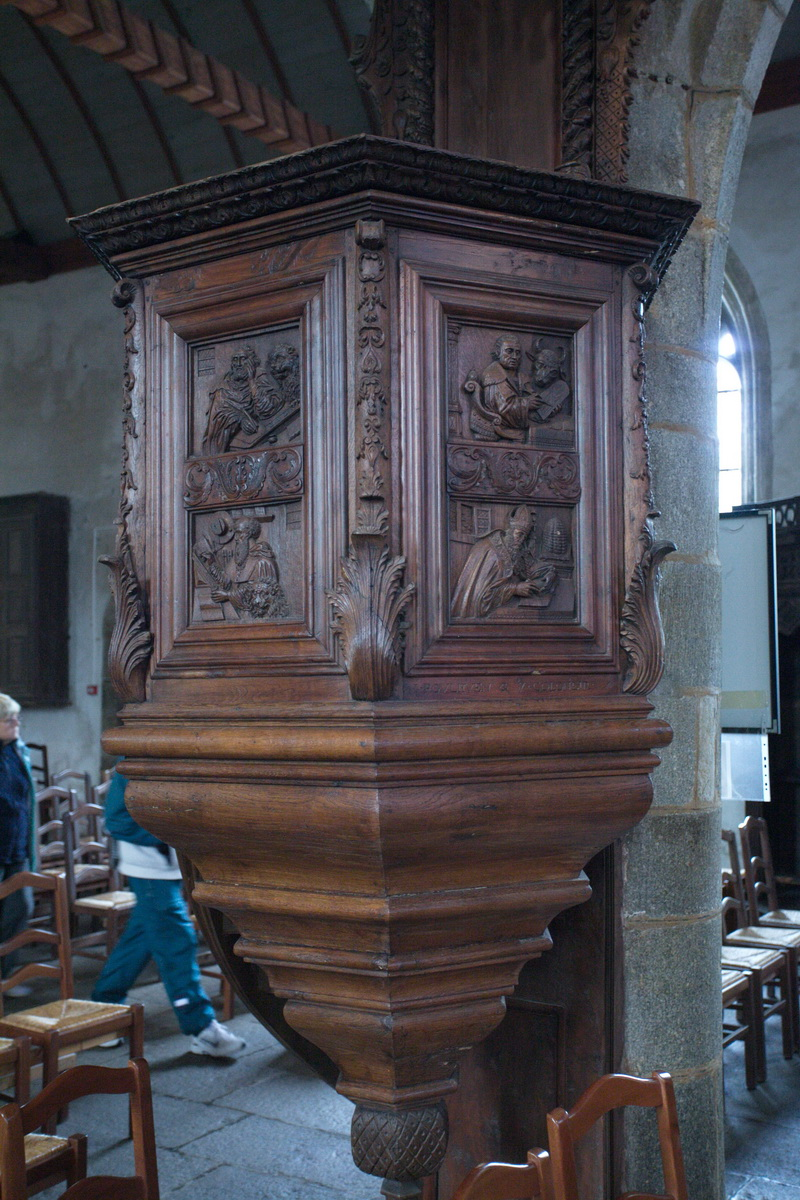
The pulpit at Lampaul-Guimiliau with carved panels

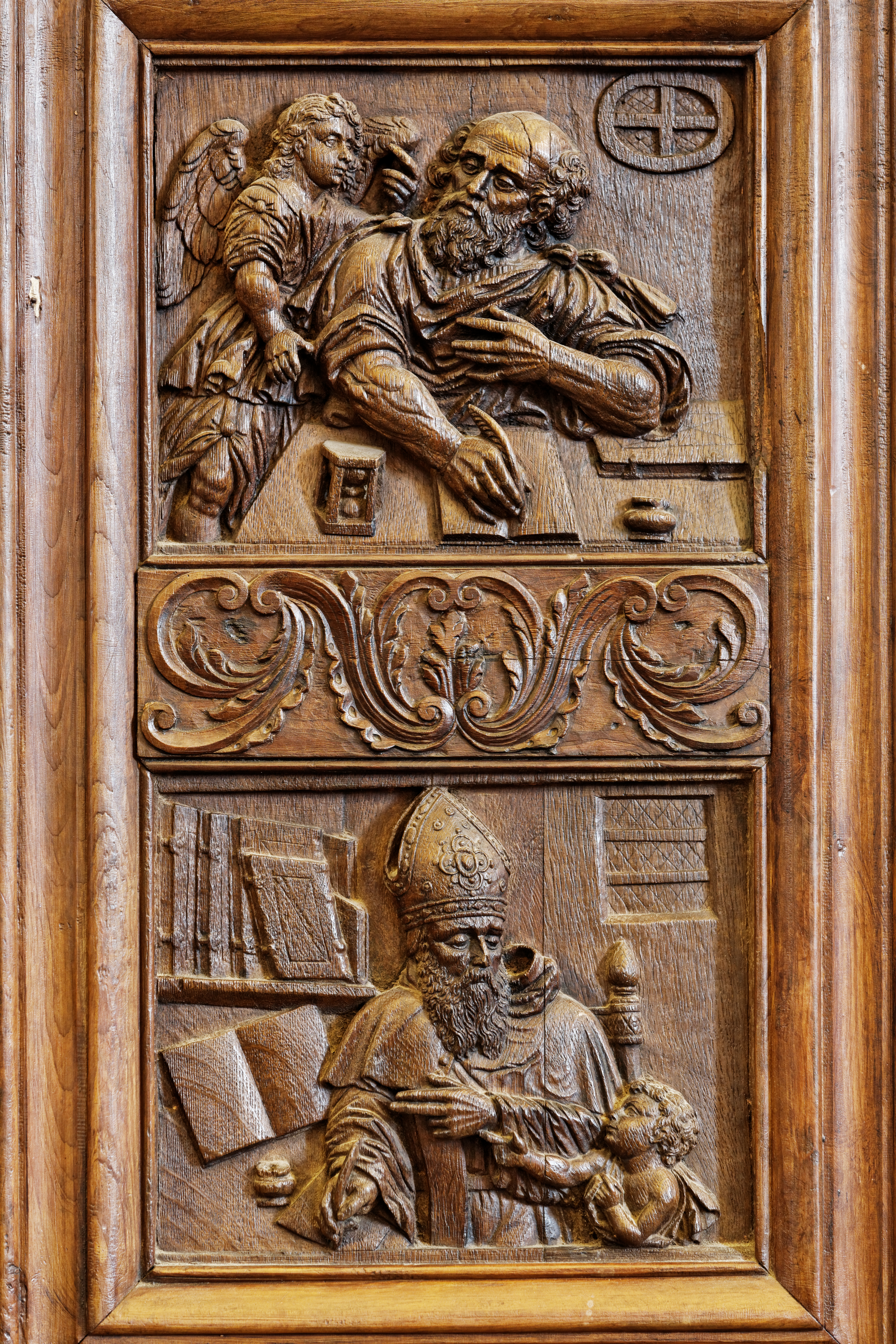
In the top panel Matthew the Evangelist is accompanied by his attribute, a small angel. In the panel below is Saint Augustine

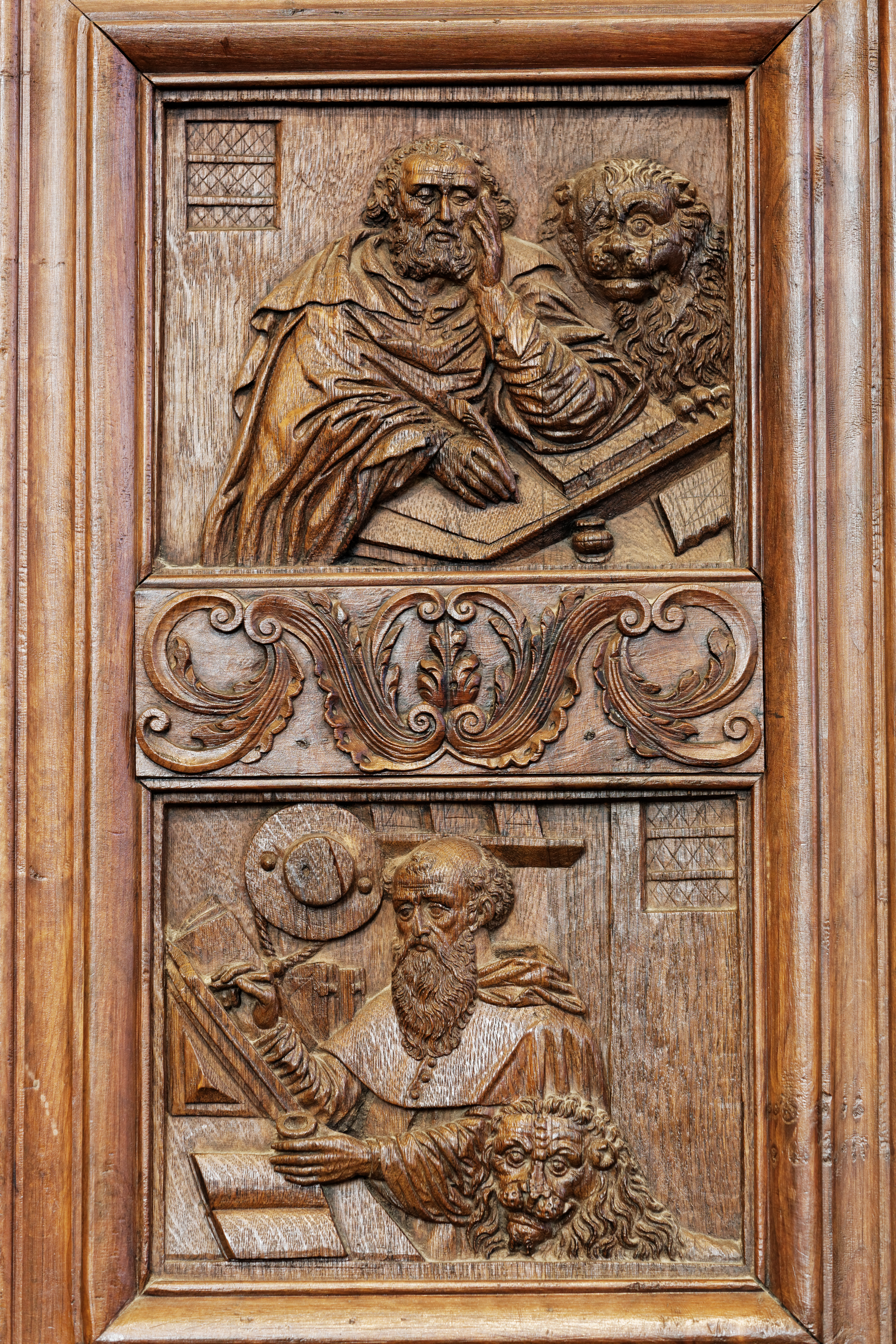
In the top panel Mark the Evangelist is accompanied by his attribute, the lion. In the panel below Saint Jerome is shown, also with a lion. Jerome is often depicted with a lion, in reference to the popular hagiographical belief that he had tamed a lion in the wilderness by healing its paw.

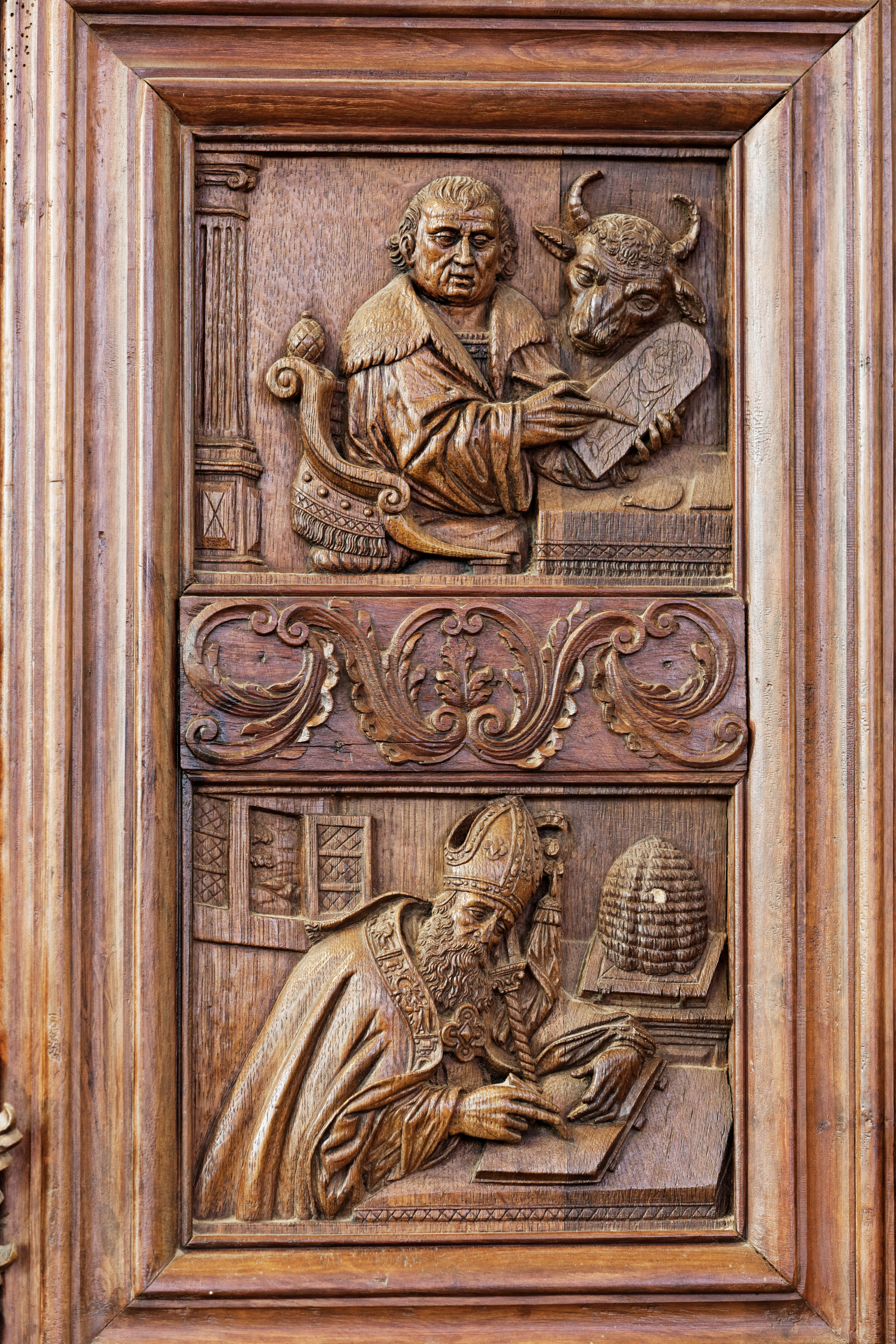
In the top panel Luke the Evangelist writes on a tablet. His attribute the ox looks on. In the lower panel we see Saint Ambrose with a bee-hive. Saint Ambrose is the patron saint of bees and beekeepers

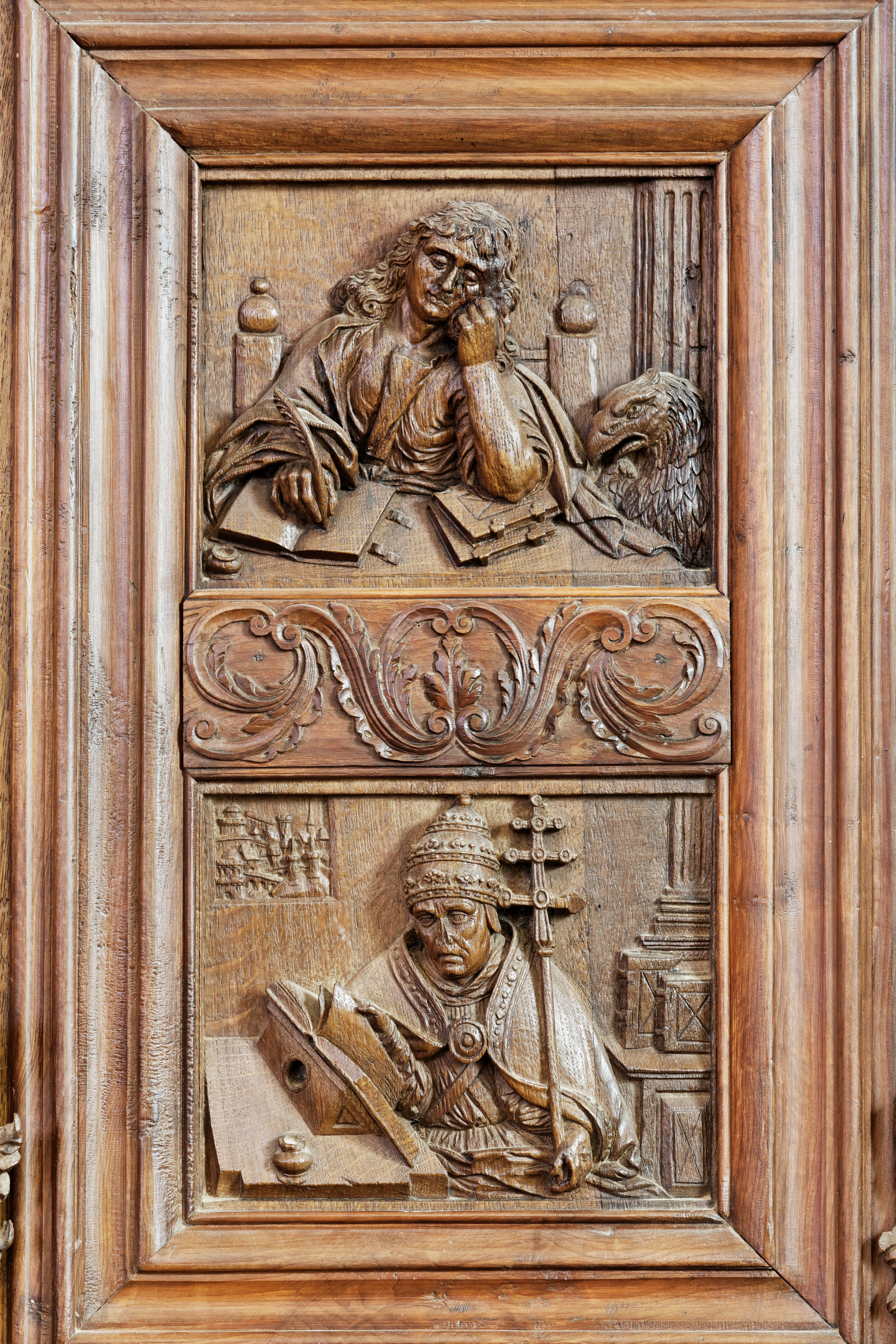
John the Evangelist sits working, his attribute the eagle at his side. In the lower panel is Saint Gregory the Great

== Saint Laurent altarpiece ==
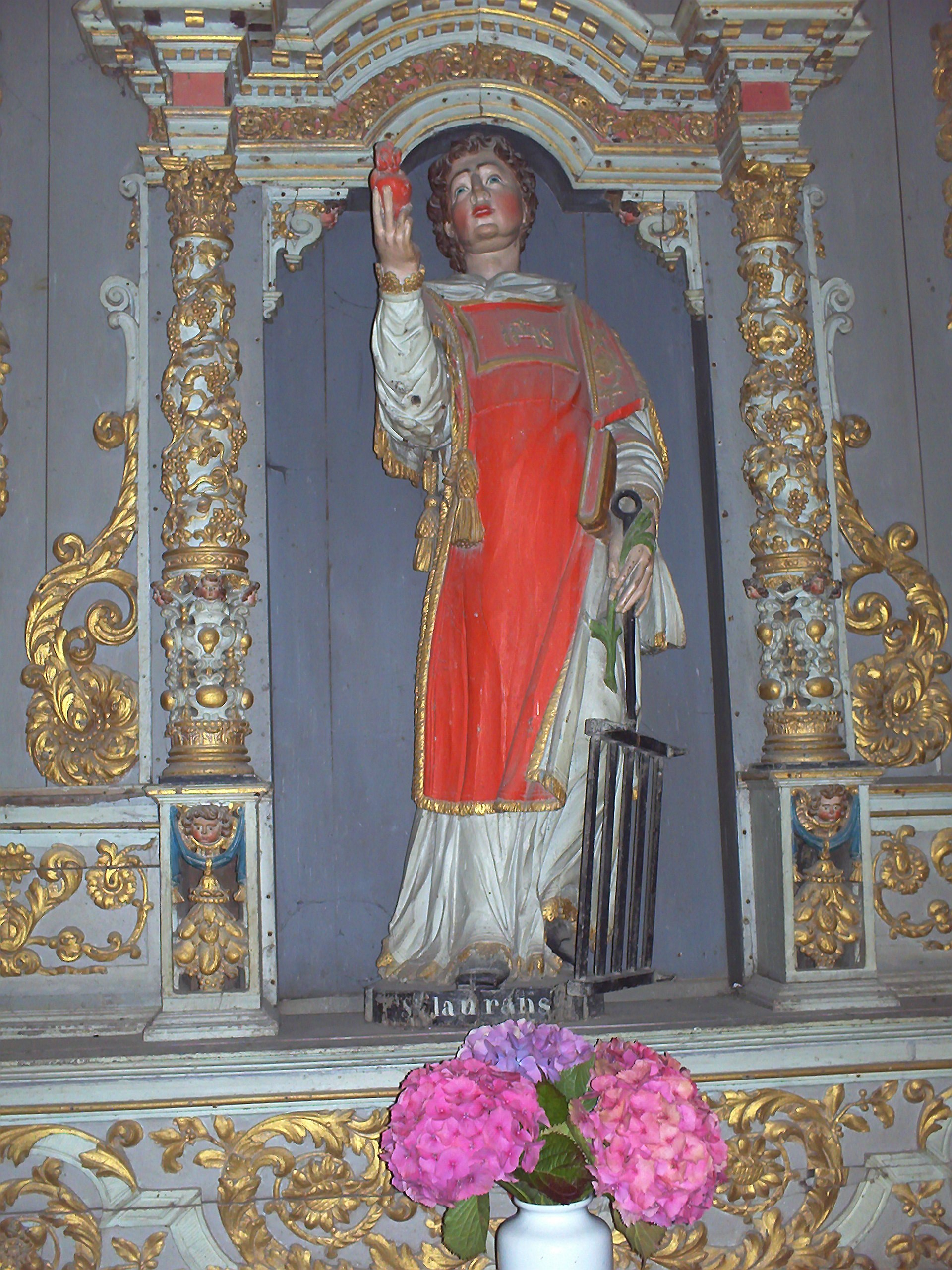
The Saint Laurent altarpiece

Includes a depiction of Lawrence of Rome in a niche. The saint holds a gridiron reminding us of the nature of his martyrdom.

== John the Baptist altarpiece ==
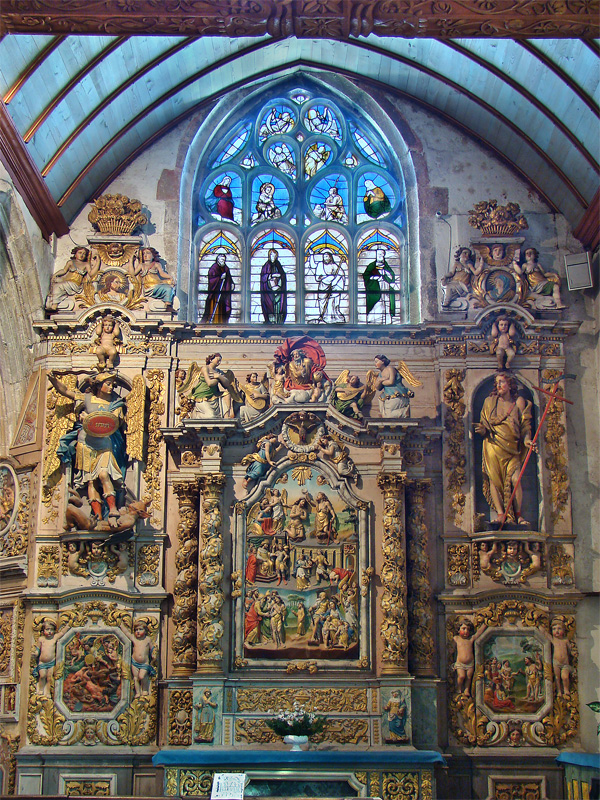
The John the Baptist altarpiece. On the left Saint Michael is depicted slaying the dragon and on the right is a depiction of John the Baptist. Beneath the depiction of Saint Michael is a composition based on Ruben's painting "The Last Judgement" whilst below John the Baptist's image is a scene showing John preaching on the banks of the Jordan. In the central tableau we see at the top, Jesus being baptized. Below this we see Salome taking John's head to Herod and at the bottom left, John is shown urging the disciples to follow Jesus and bottom right, "La sainte Parenté" after Bartholomeus Spranger

This altarpiece is to the right of the choir area. In the choir area are two statues. One depicts Saint Peter with his keys and the other Saint Paul.

== Saint Anne altarpiece ==
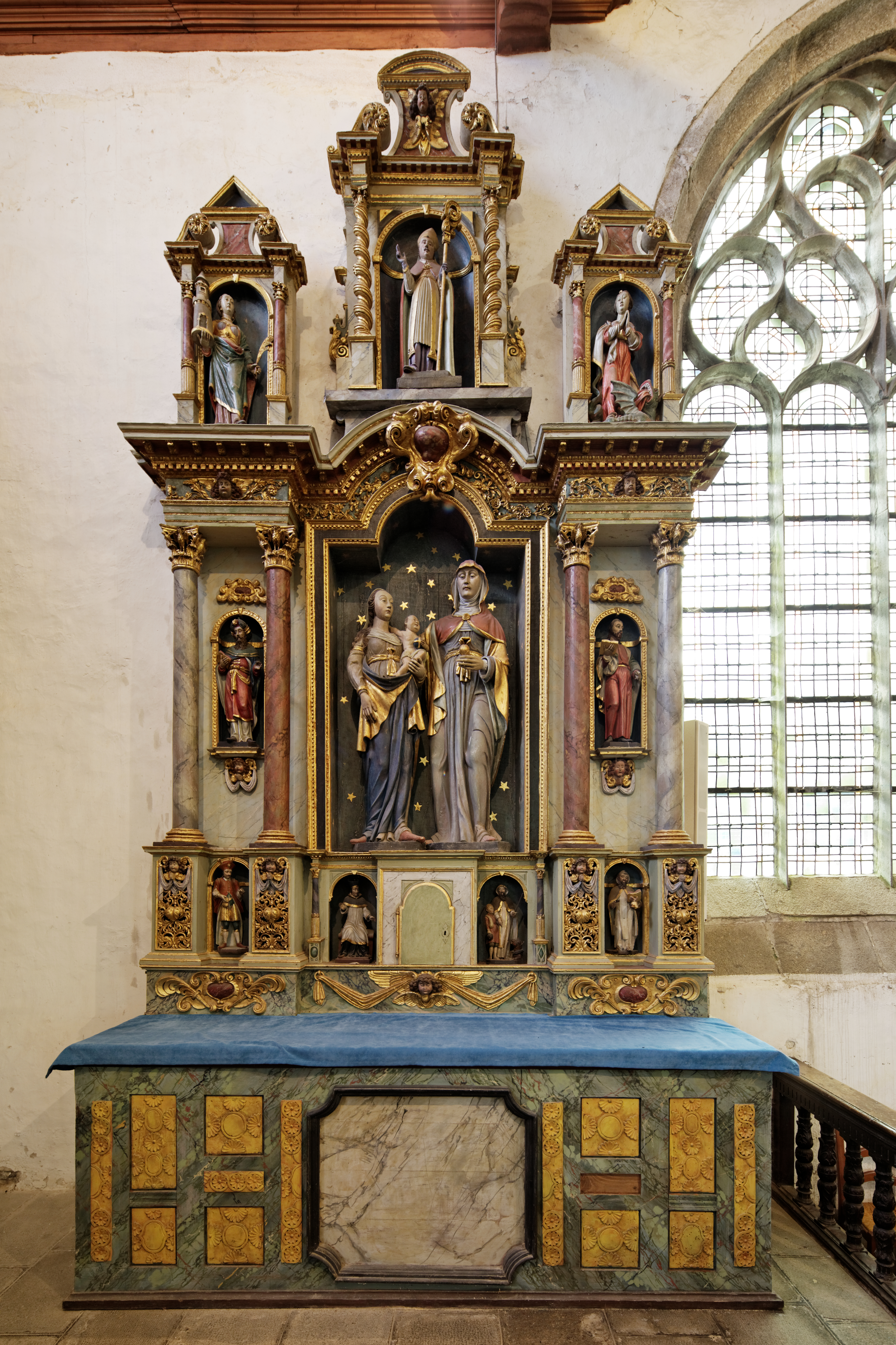
The Saint Anne altarpiece

This was designed by G. Carquain in the 17th century and shows Saint Anne with the Virgin Mary in the centre. On the right of this is a depiction of Saint Joseph, and on the left Saint Joachim. Top left is Saint Barbara, top centre a bishop and top right Saint Marguerite. Along the bottom of the altarpiece, and from left to right, we have a depiction of the "rich", then Saint Yves followed by Saint Hervé and Saint Cadou.

== Stoup ==
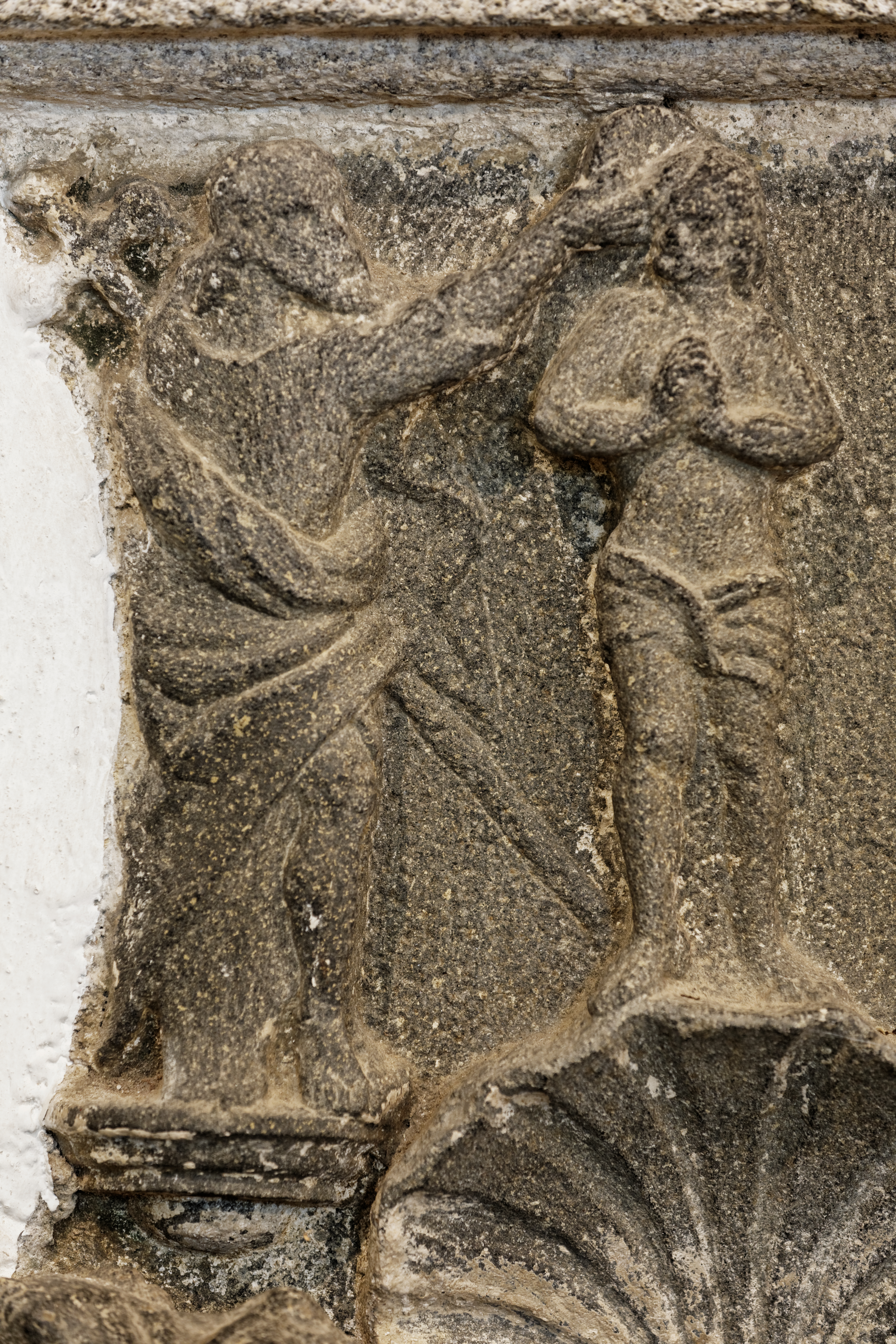
The stoup with depiction of Jesus being baptized by John the Baptist

The church has a stoup decorated with a demon and a serpent and a depiction of John the Baptist baptizing Jesus. This stoup is located inside the church.

== Main altar ==
Near the main altar there is a lectern in the form of an eagle and 17th century stalls with carvings depicting monsters.

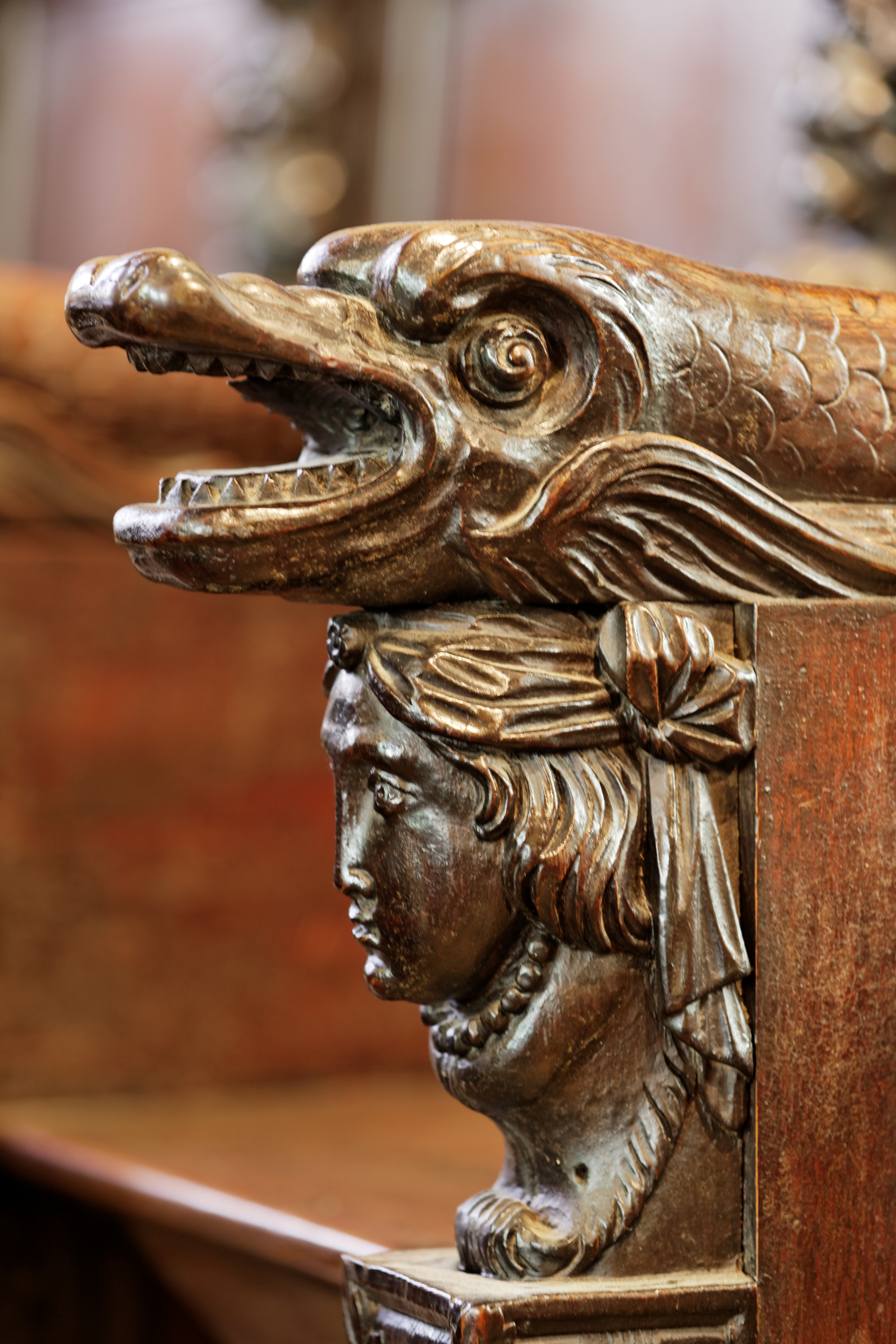
Stall carving at the Église Notre-Dame. Lampaul-Guimiliau

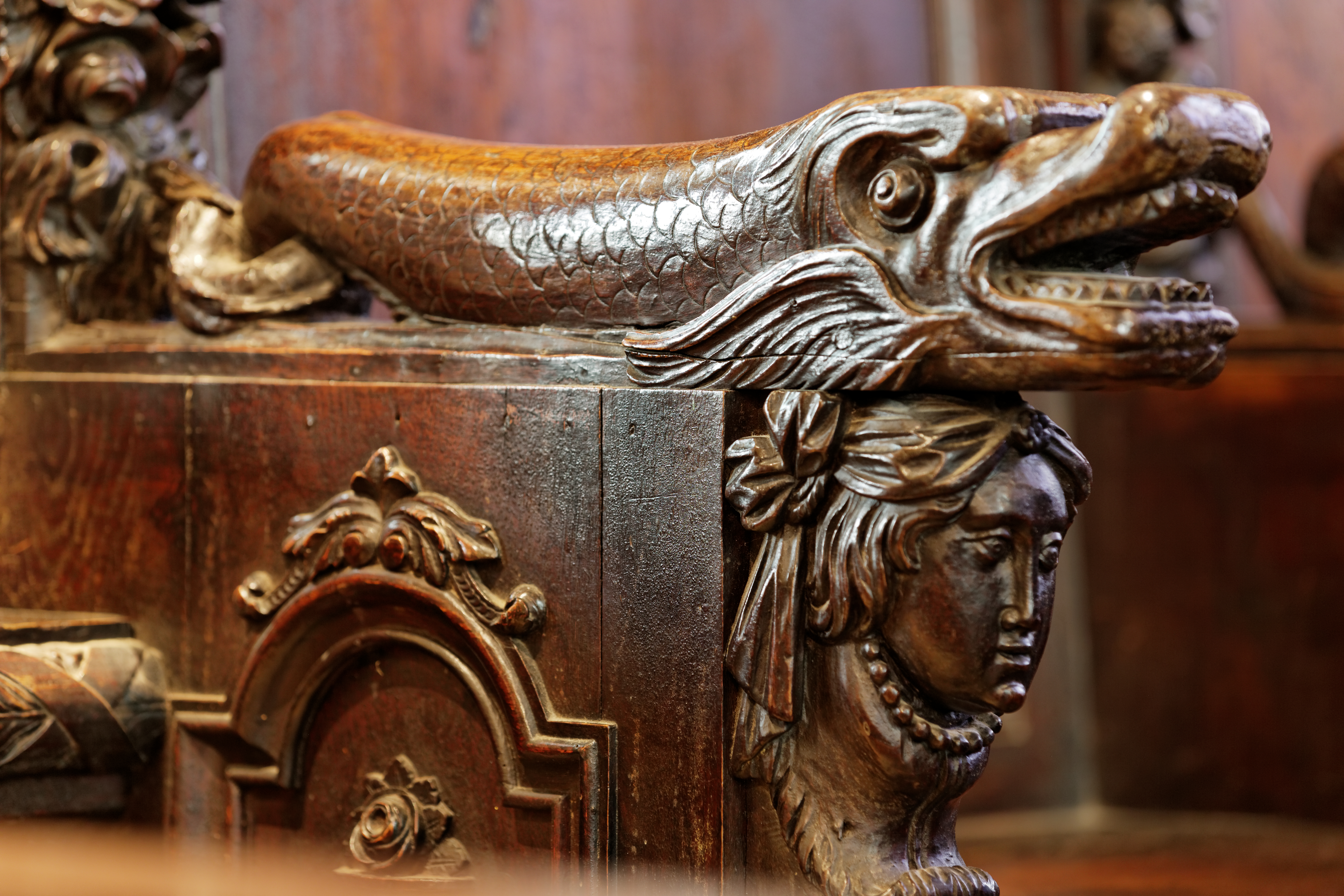
Stall carving at the Église Notre-Dame. Lampaul-Guimiliau

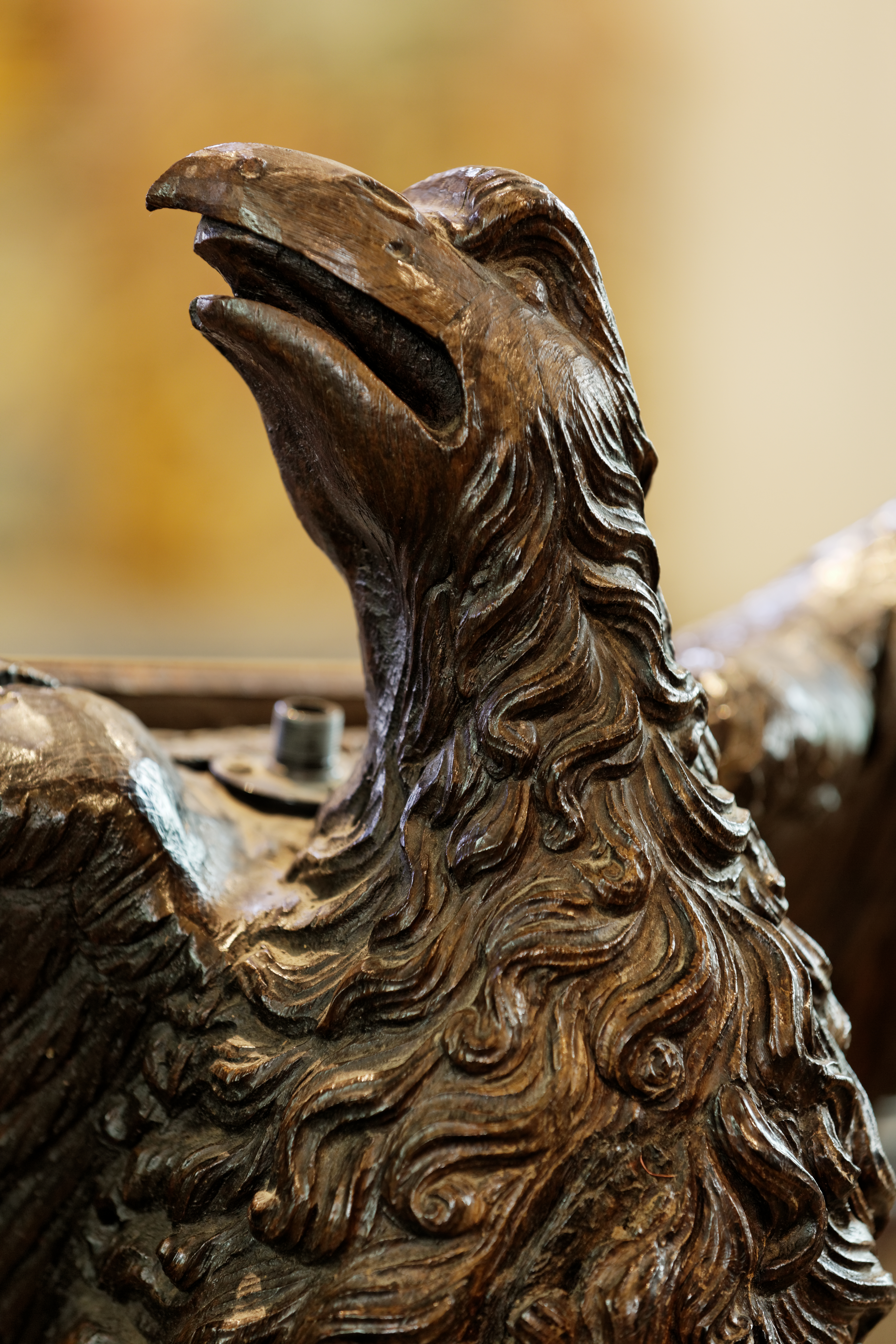
The lectern at Lampaul-Guimiliau

== Altarpiece of the High Priest (Saint Mathurin) ==
See image.

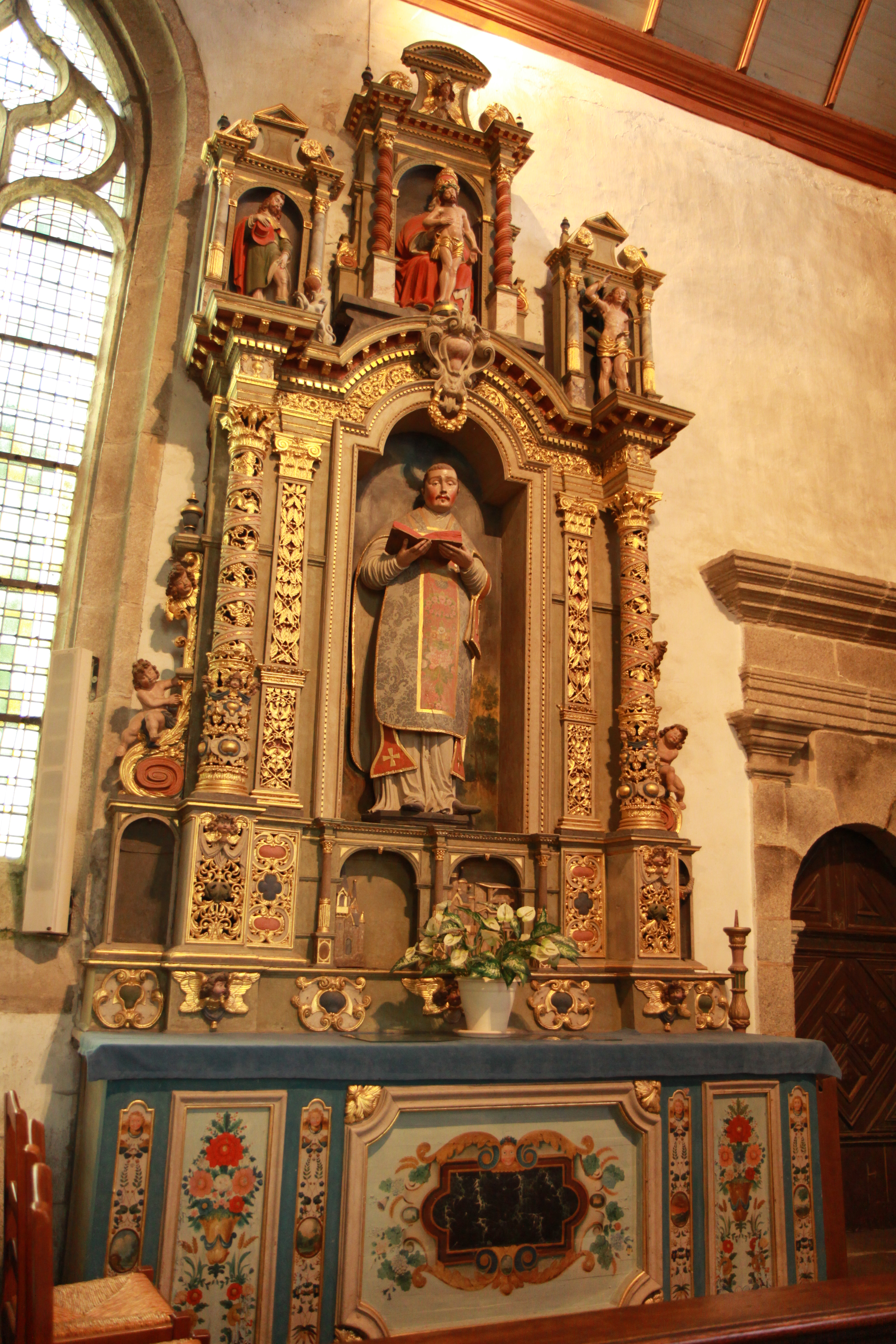
In the centre a depiction of Saint Mathurin. At the top left is Saint Roch, then the Holy Father presenting his son the risen Christ and on the top right, Saint Sebastian. In the empty niches below there had been an image of a bishop and depictions of pilgrims travelling to Emmaus but these are no longer there

== Altarpiece of Saint Marguerite ==
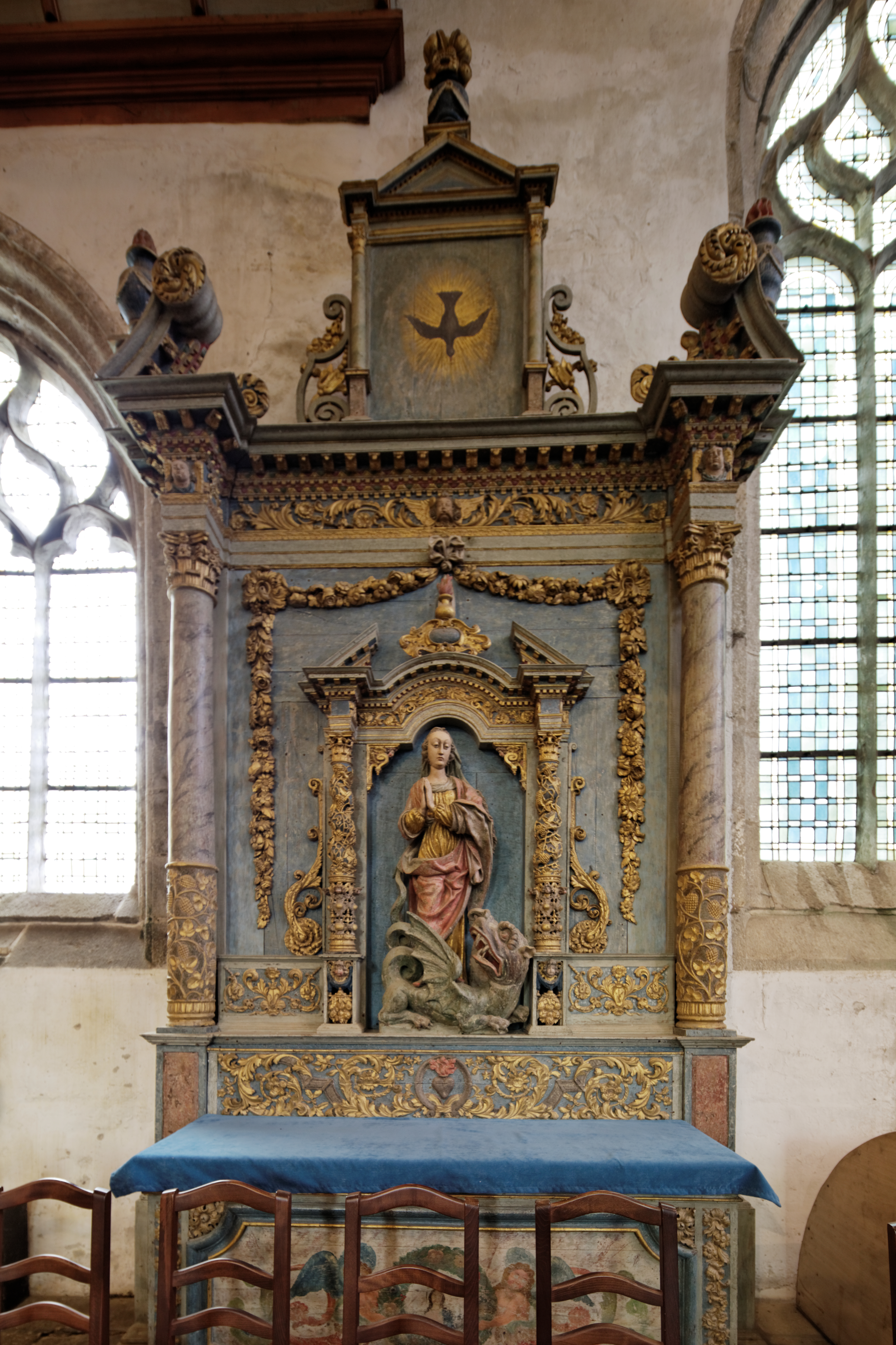
The altarpiece of Saint Marguerite

The saint is threatened by a demonic creature but tramples on it. A symbol of the victory of good over evil.

== Altarpiece of the Passion ==
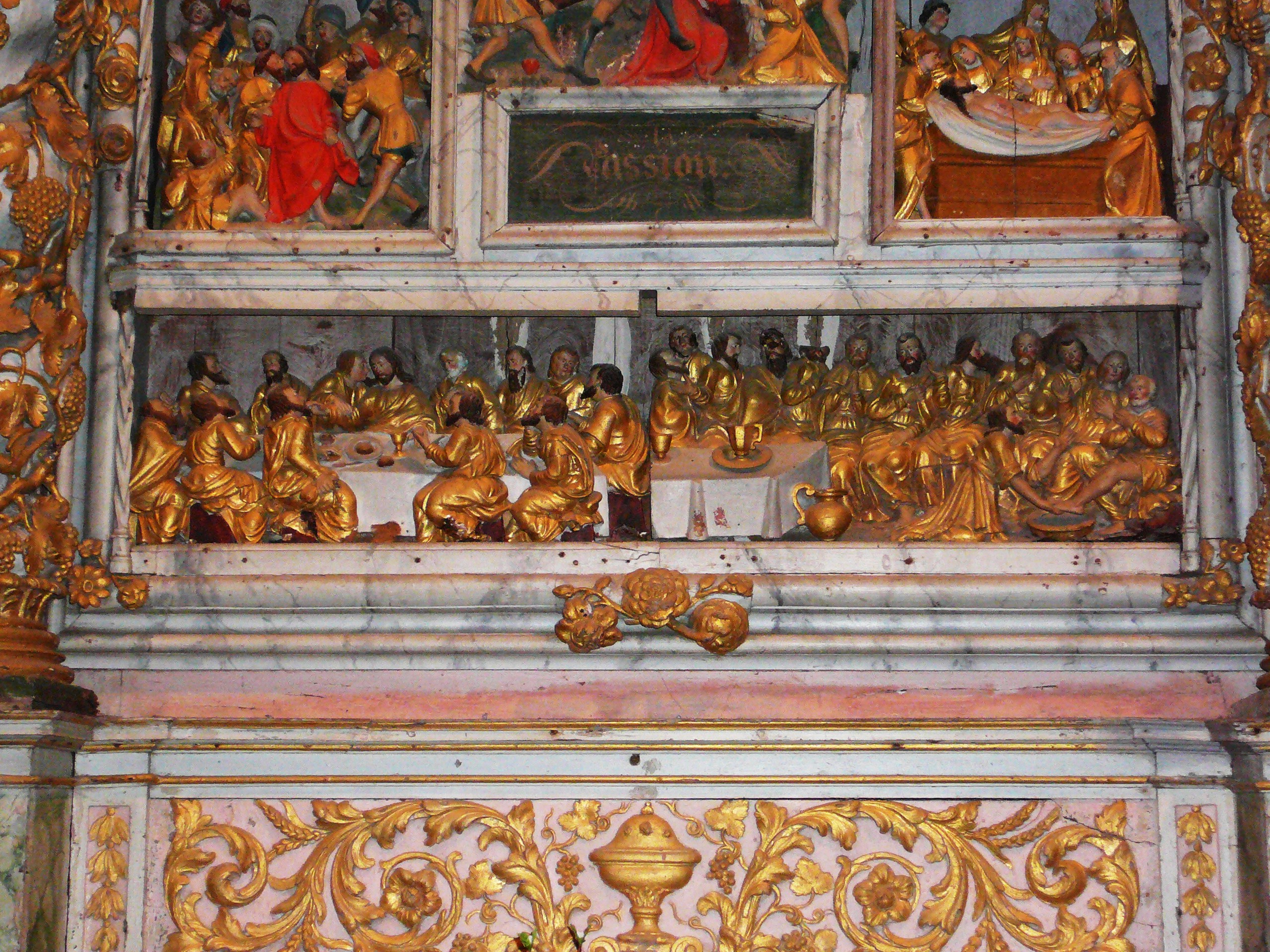
The Last Supper and Jesus washing his disciples' feet. Part of the altarpiece of the Passion at Lampaul-Guimiliau

This altarpiece dates to the 17th century. In the top right hand section there is a depiction of Saint Miliau, the patron saint of Guimiliau, and below a scene showing his martyrdom when he was beheaded by his brother Rivode. The left hand side has an image of the bishop of Léon and below that a depiction of the Virgin Mary's birth. The central section was supplied by an Antwerp workshop and in eight magnificent tableaux, the sculptors have created 80 images representing the story of the passion. At the very bottom the scenes presented are of the Last Supper and Jesus washing the disciples' feet and in the other sections, we see representations of Judas' kiss, the flagellation, Jesus carrying the cross, the descent from the cross, the entombment and the altar of the passion itself.

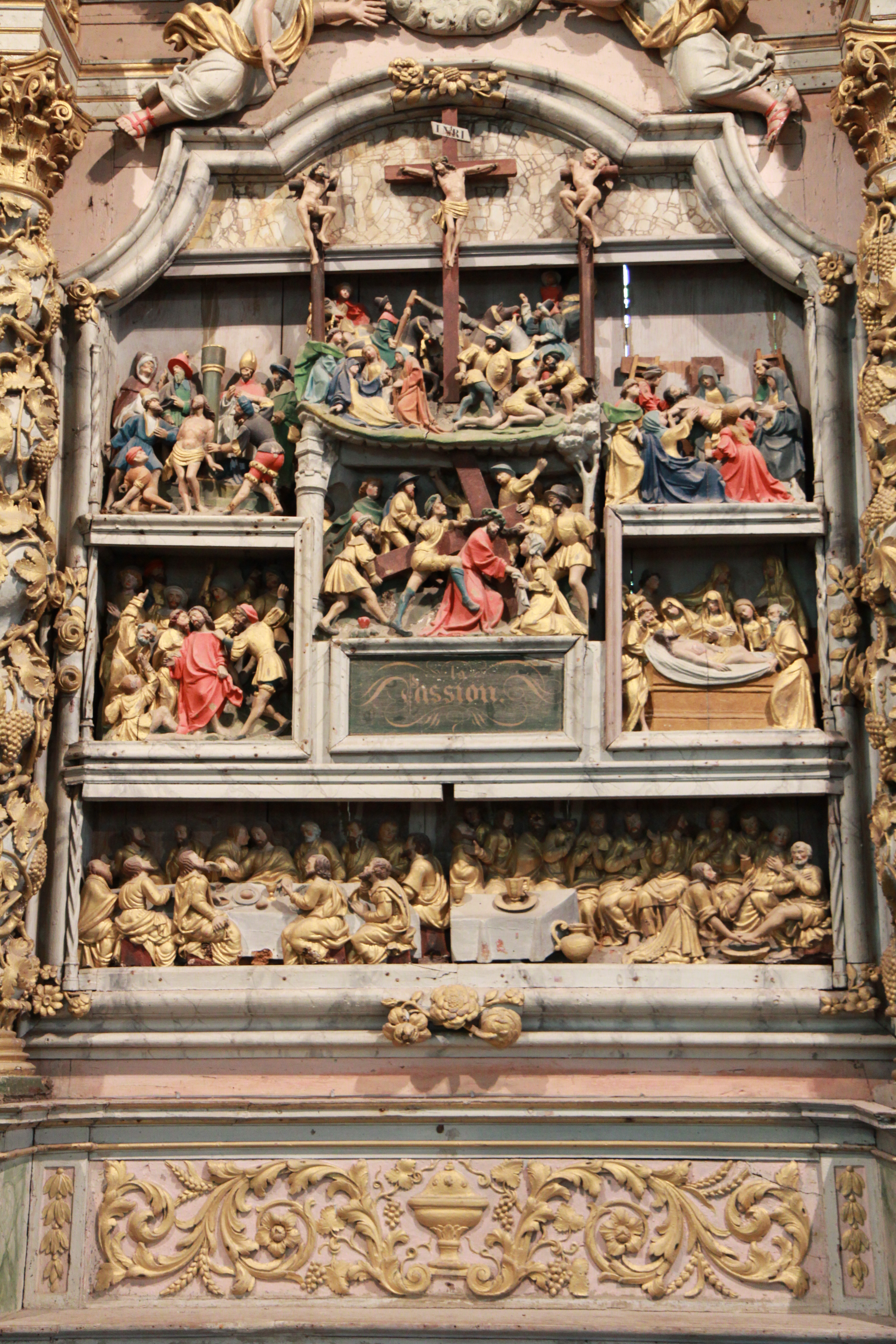

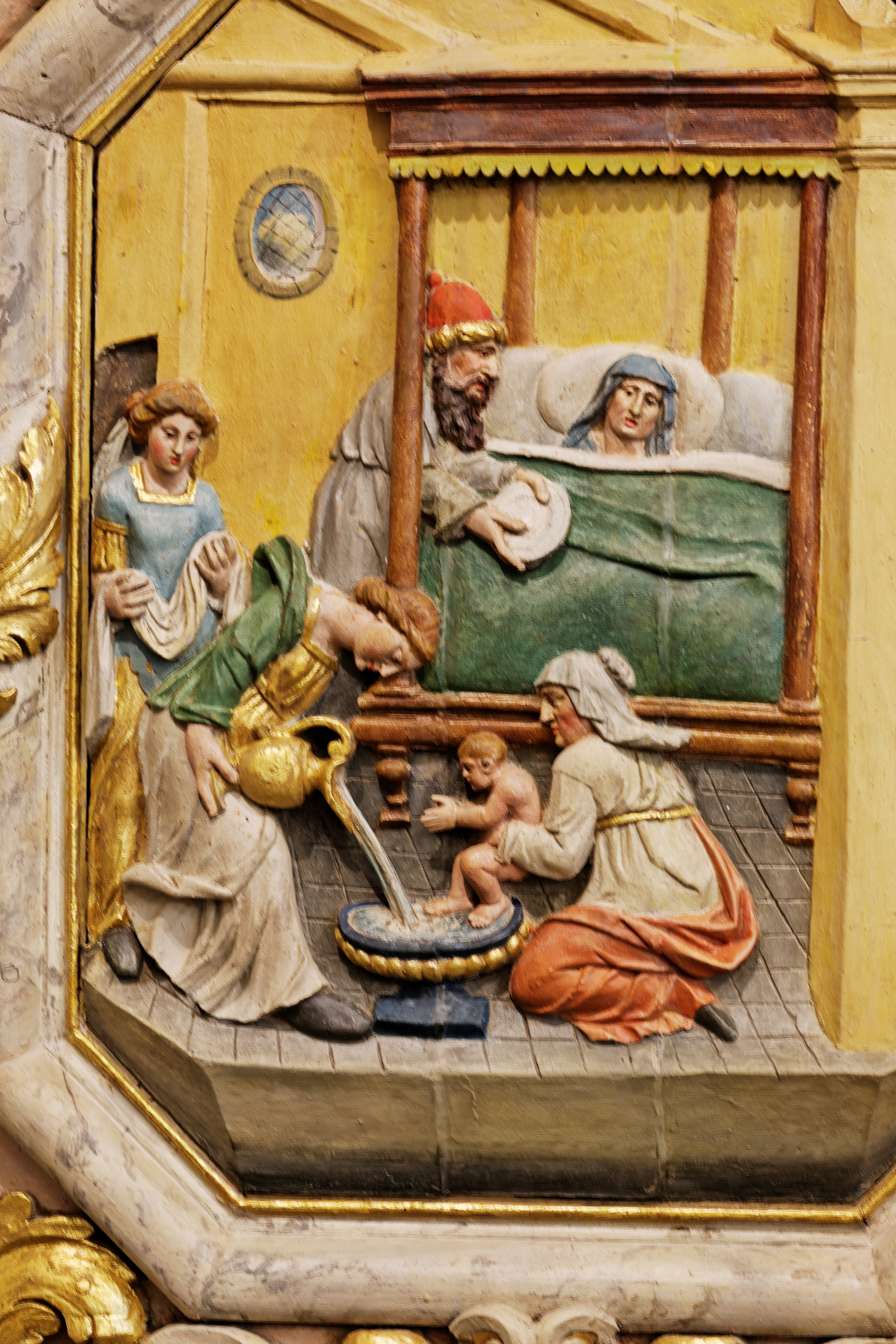
The birth of the Virgin Mary

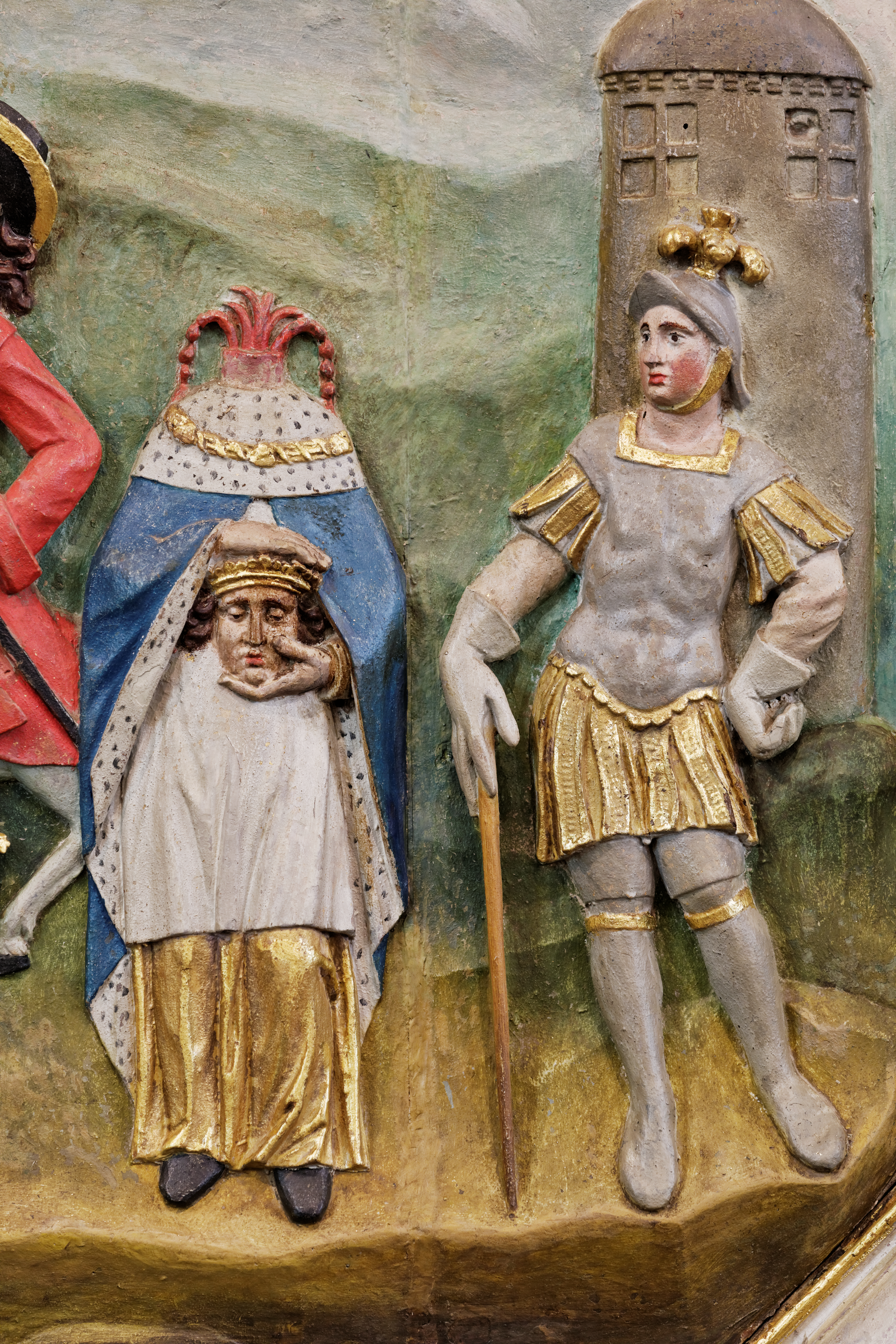
The martyrdom of Saint Miliau

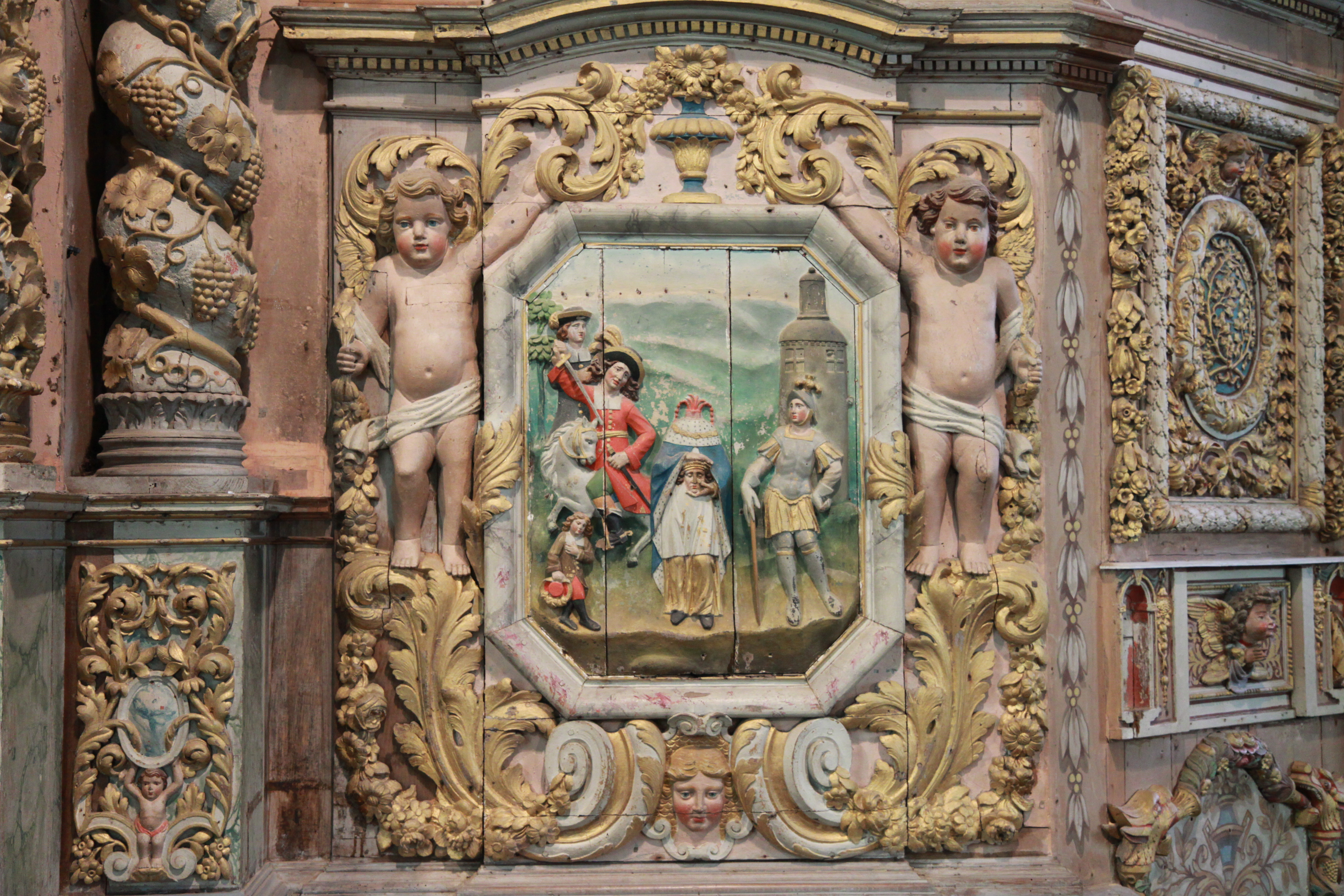
The martyrdom of Saint Miliau

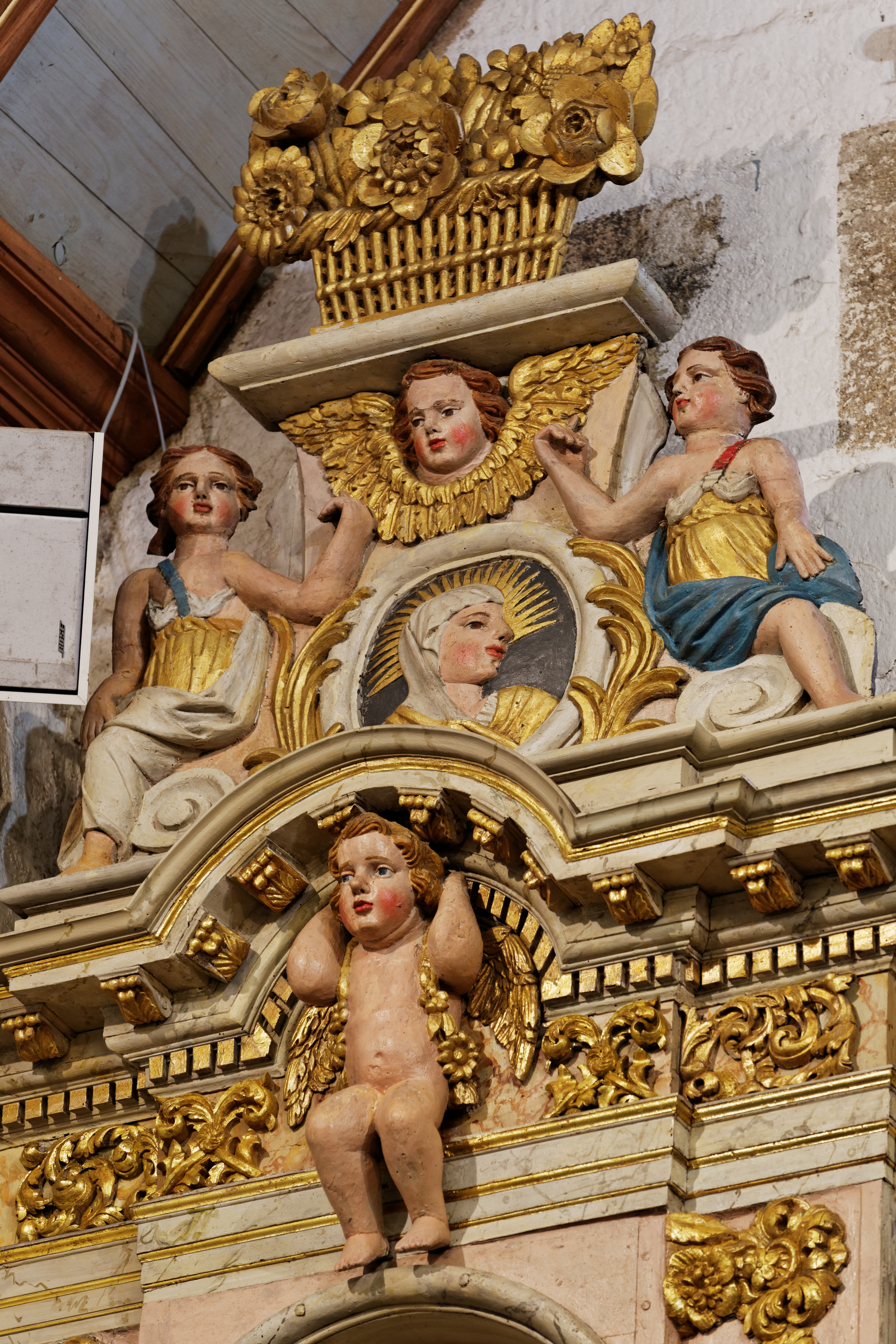
Detail from the altarpiece of the "Passion"

== Descent from the Cross ==
This is a remarkable work of art dating to 1520 and carved from a single block of oak.

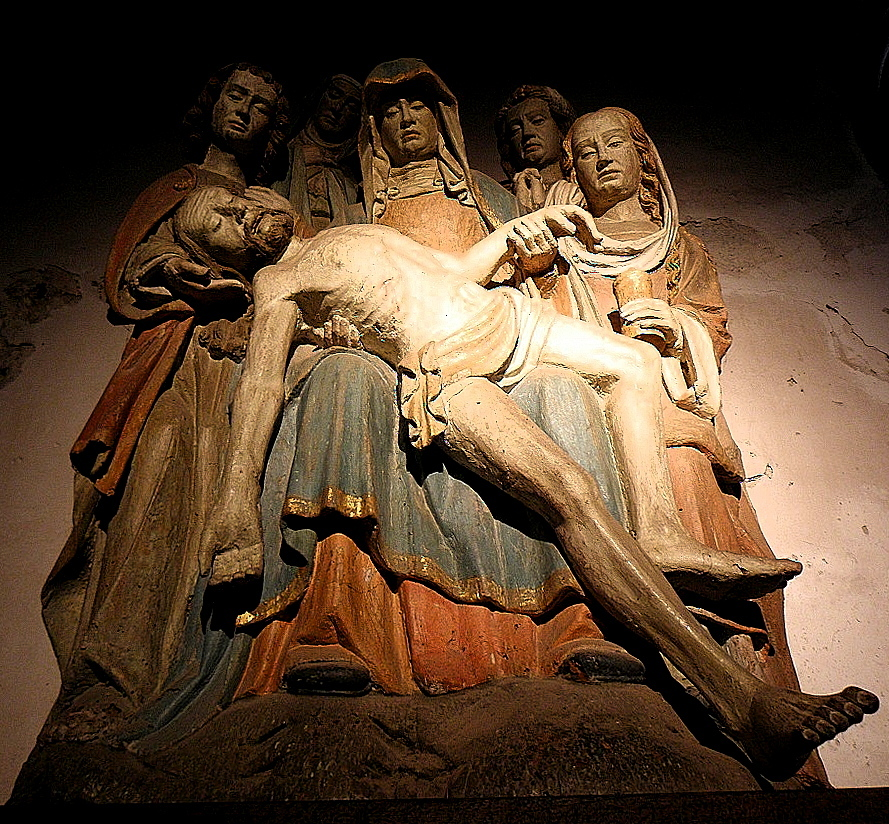
The descent from the cross. Église Notre-Dame. Lampaul-Guimilaiu

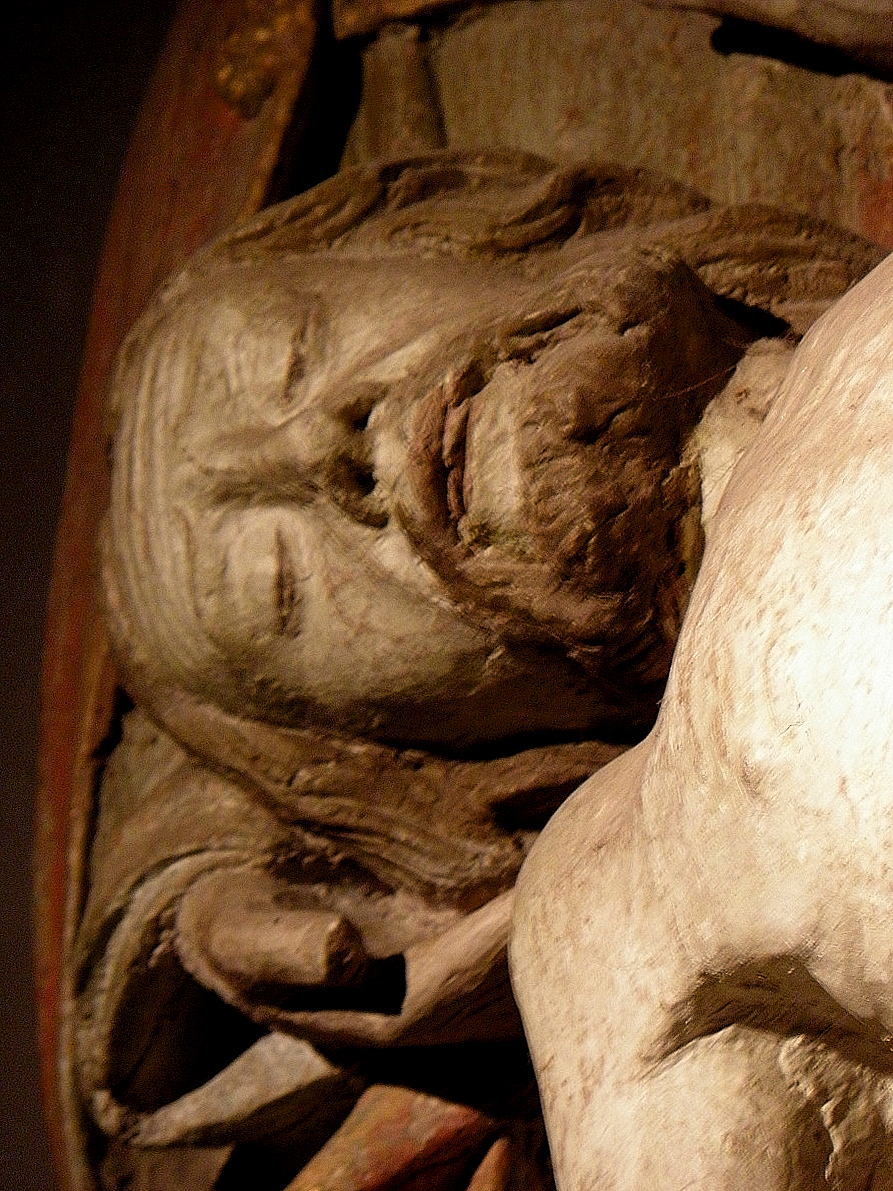
The descent from the cross. Église Notre-Dame. Lampaul-Guimilaiu

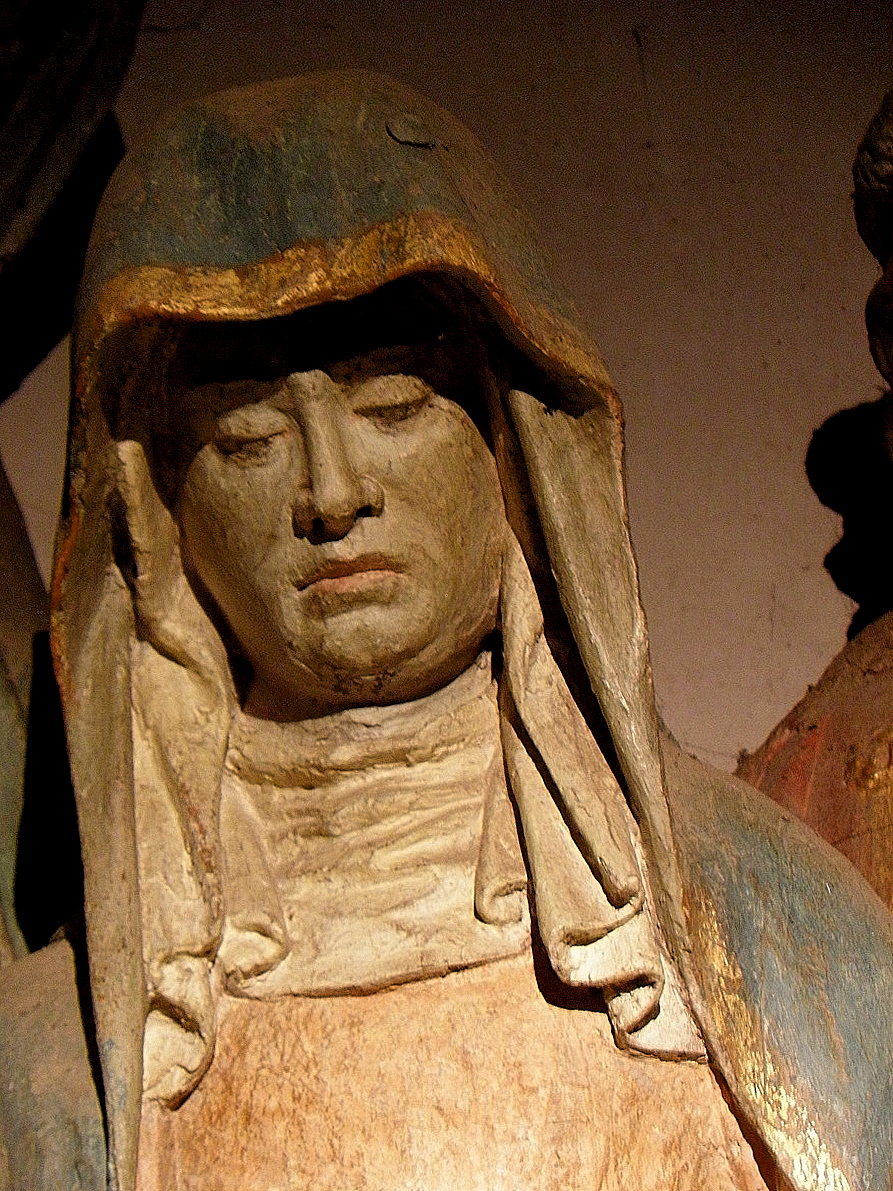
The descent from the cross. Église Notre-Dame. Lampaul-Guimilaiu

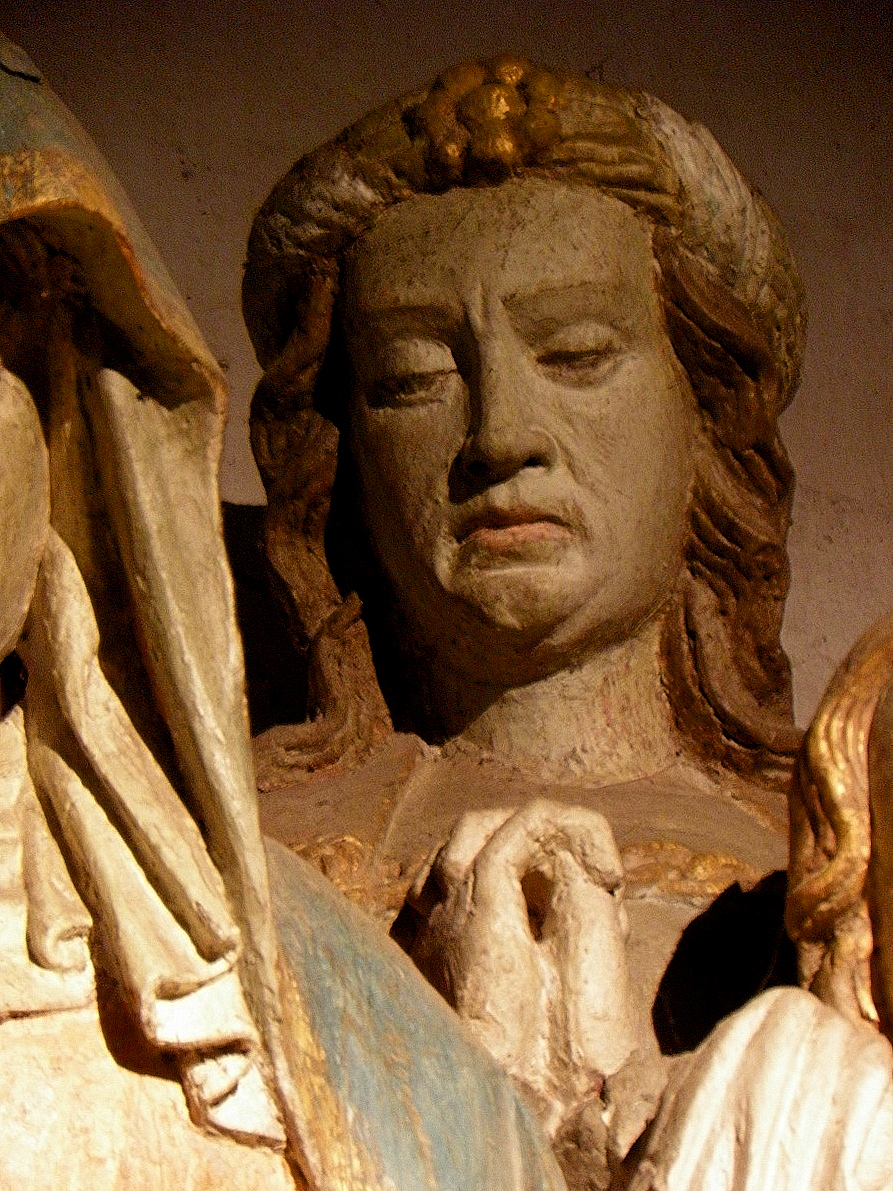
The descent from the cross. Église Notre-Dame. Lampaul-Guimilaiu

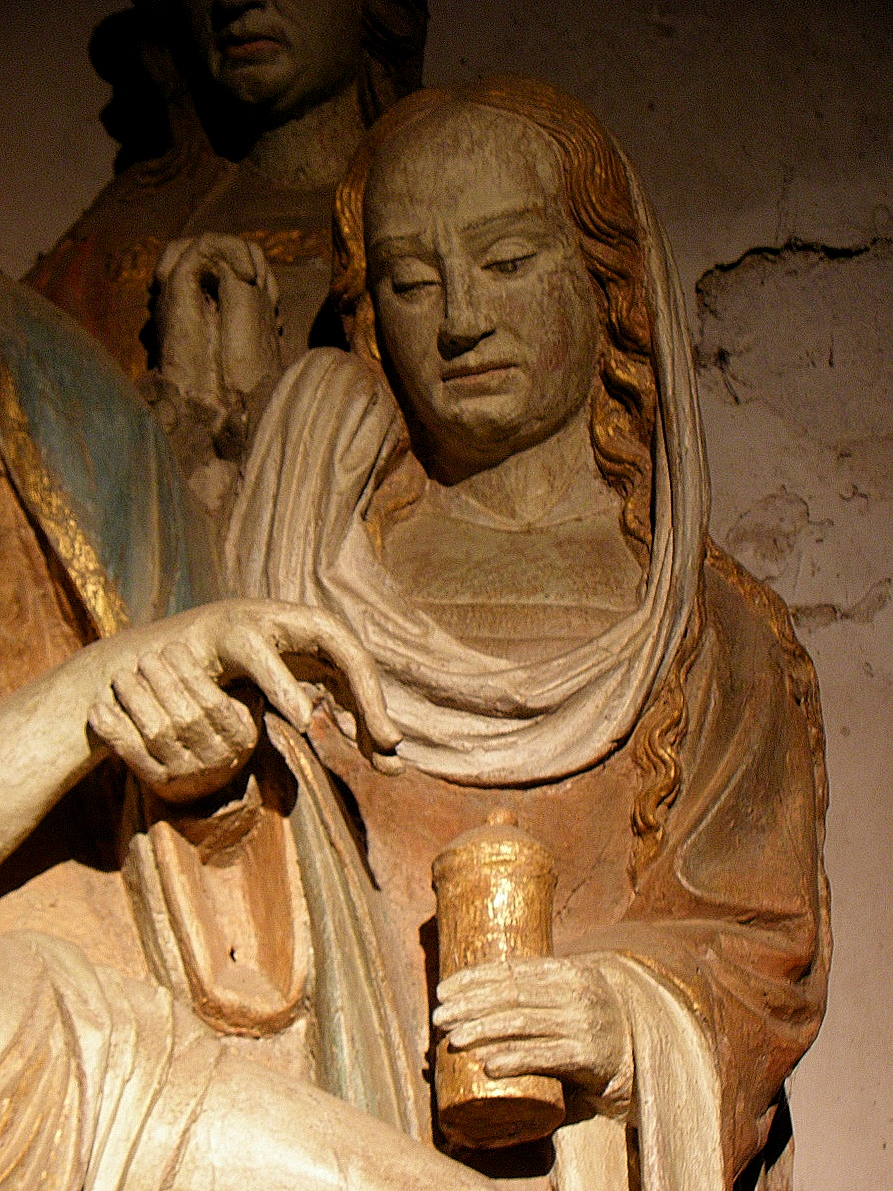
The descent from the cross. Église Notre-Dame. Lampaul-Guimilaiu

== Processional banners ==
The church has preserved and has on display, a processional banner depicting Saint Pol and dating to 1634 and another, dating to 1667, depicting the Virgin Mary.

== Burial of Jesus ==
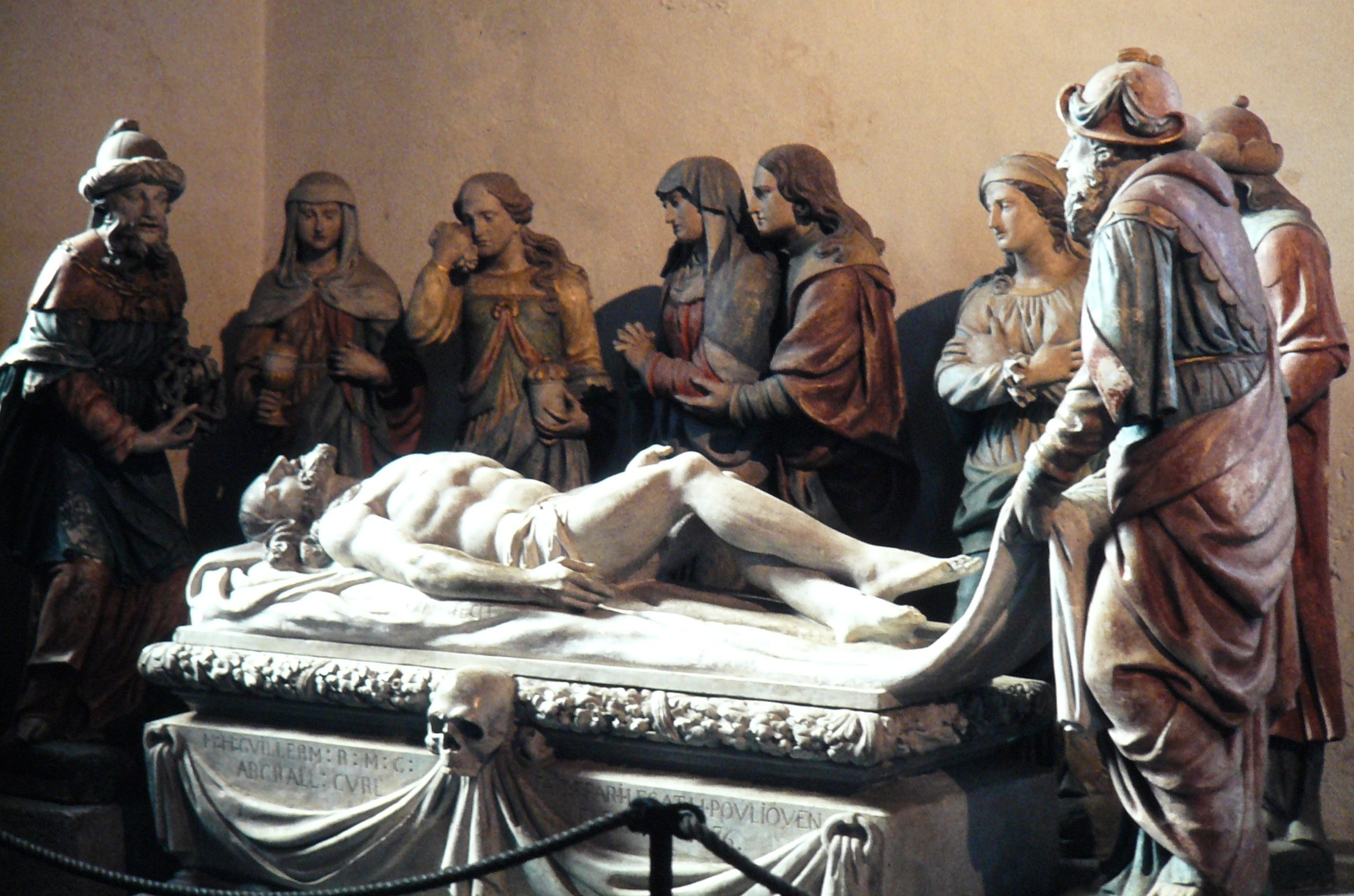
The "mise au Tombeau" at Lampaul-Guimiliau

This remarkable sculptural work dates to 1676 and recreates Jesus' followers preparing his body for burial after its removal from the cross. The followers include Joseph of Arimathea, Nicodemus, Gamaliel, the Virgin Mary, John the Evangelist, Mary Magdalene, Mary the mother of James and Mary Salome (disciple). The sculptor was Antoine Chavagnac. Chavagnac was a sculptor to the French Navy in Brest.

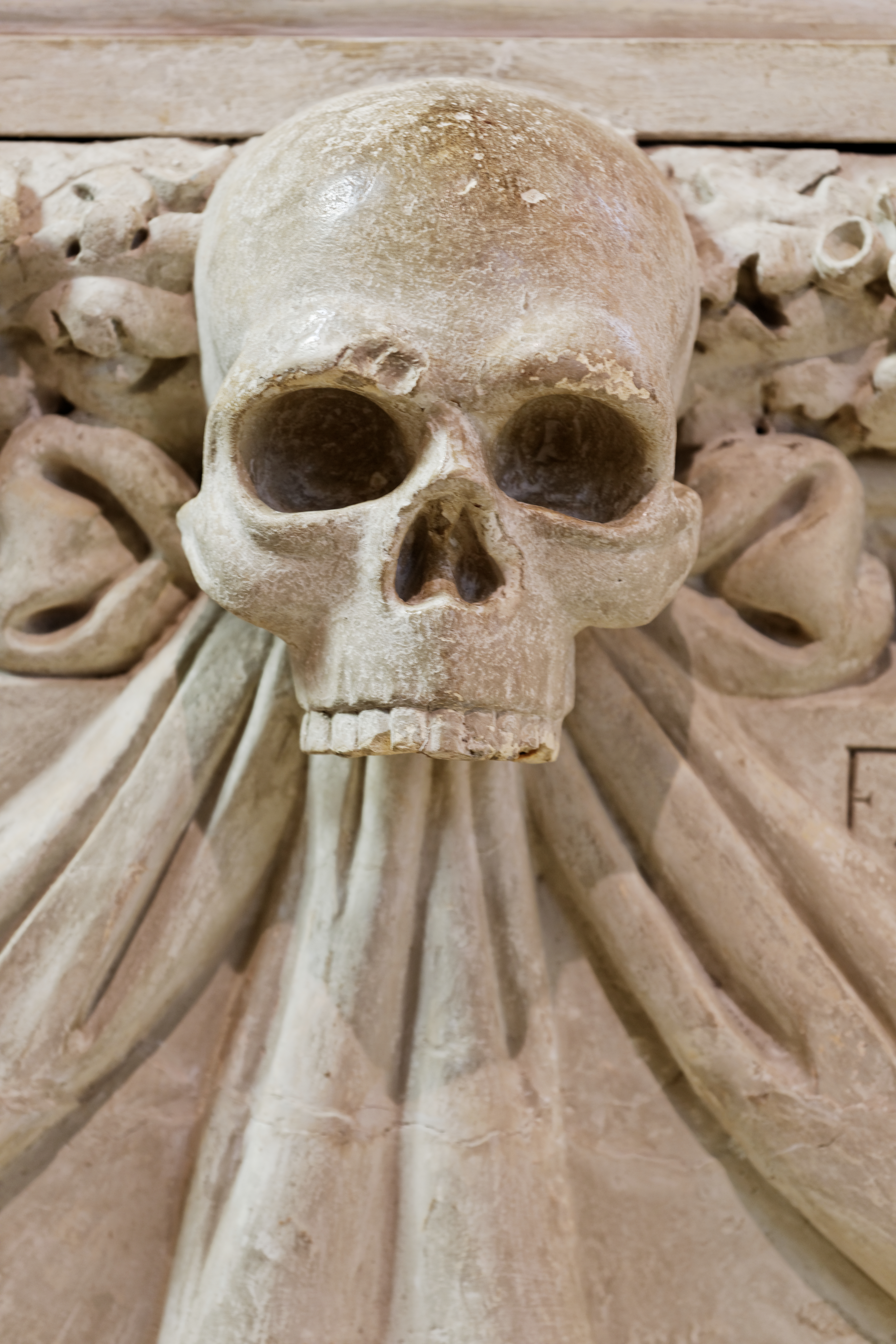
A skull decorating the tomb prepared for Jesus' burial

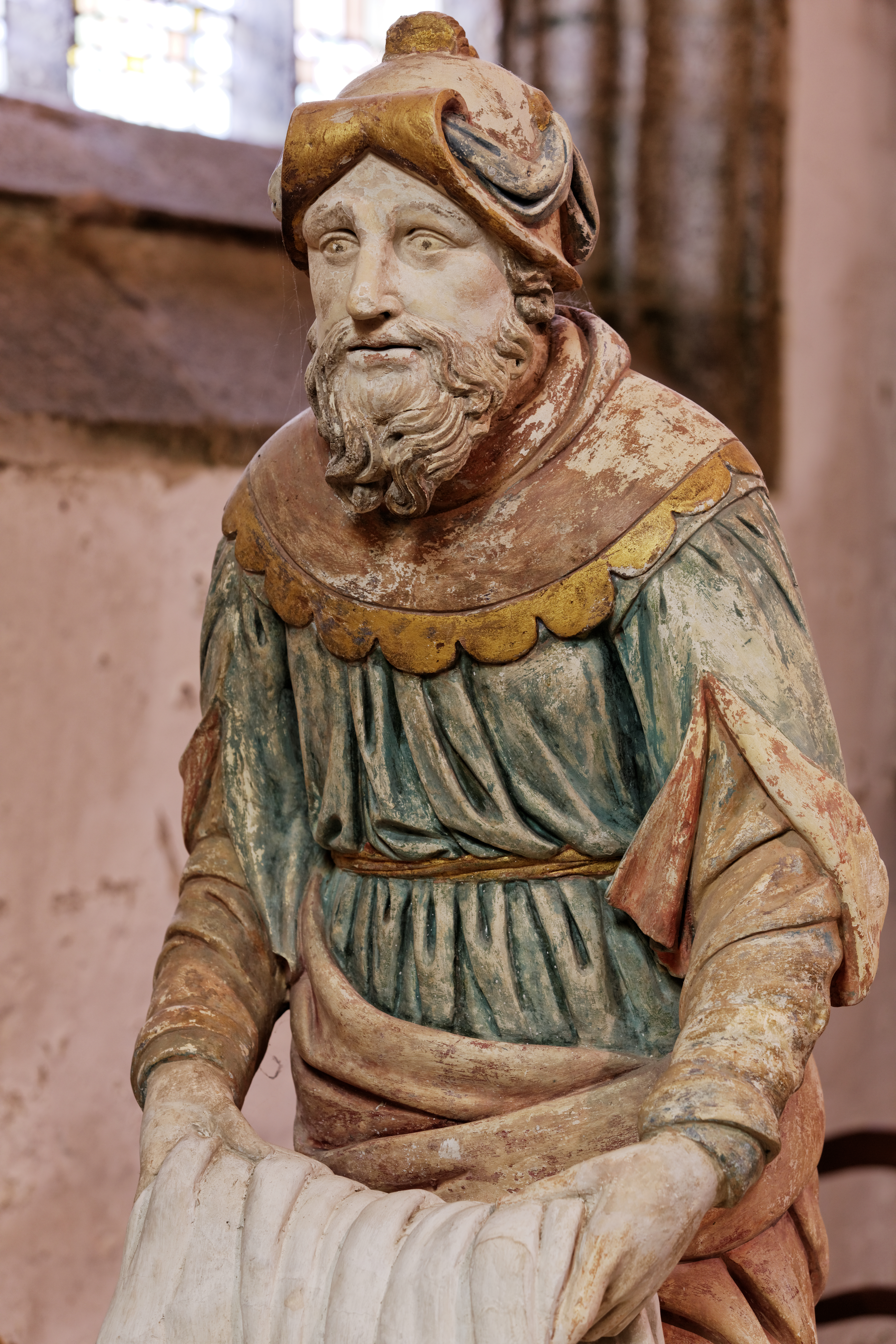
Nicodemus in the Église Notre-Dame "mise au Tombeau"

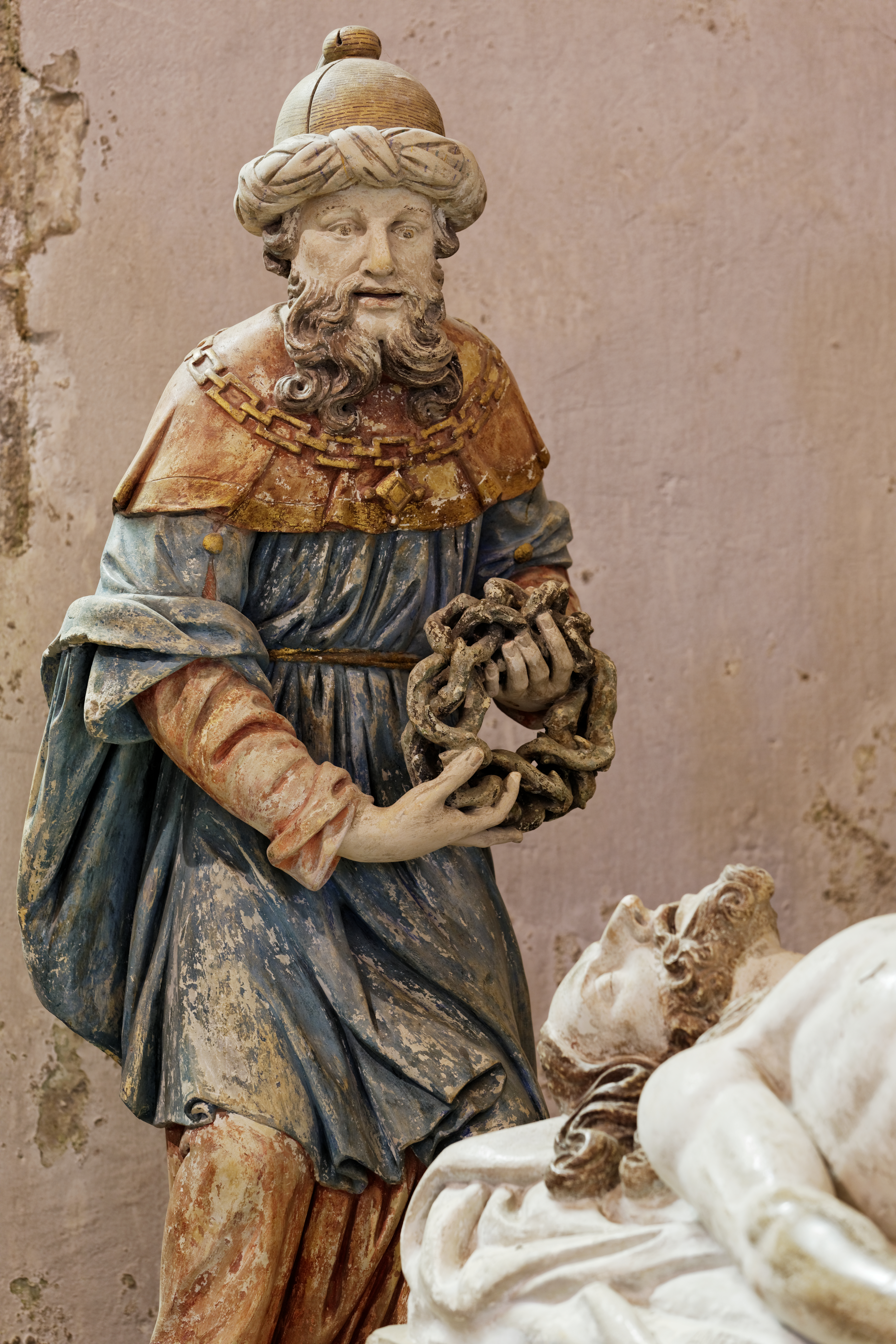
Joseph of Arimathea in the Église Notre-Dame "mise au Tombeau"

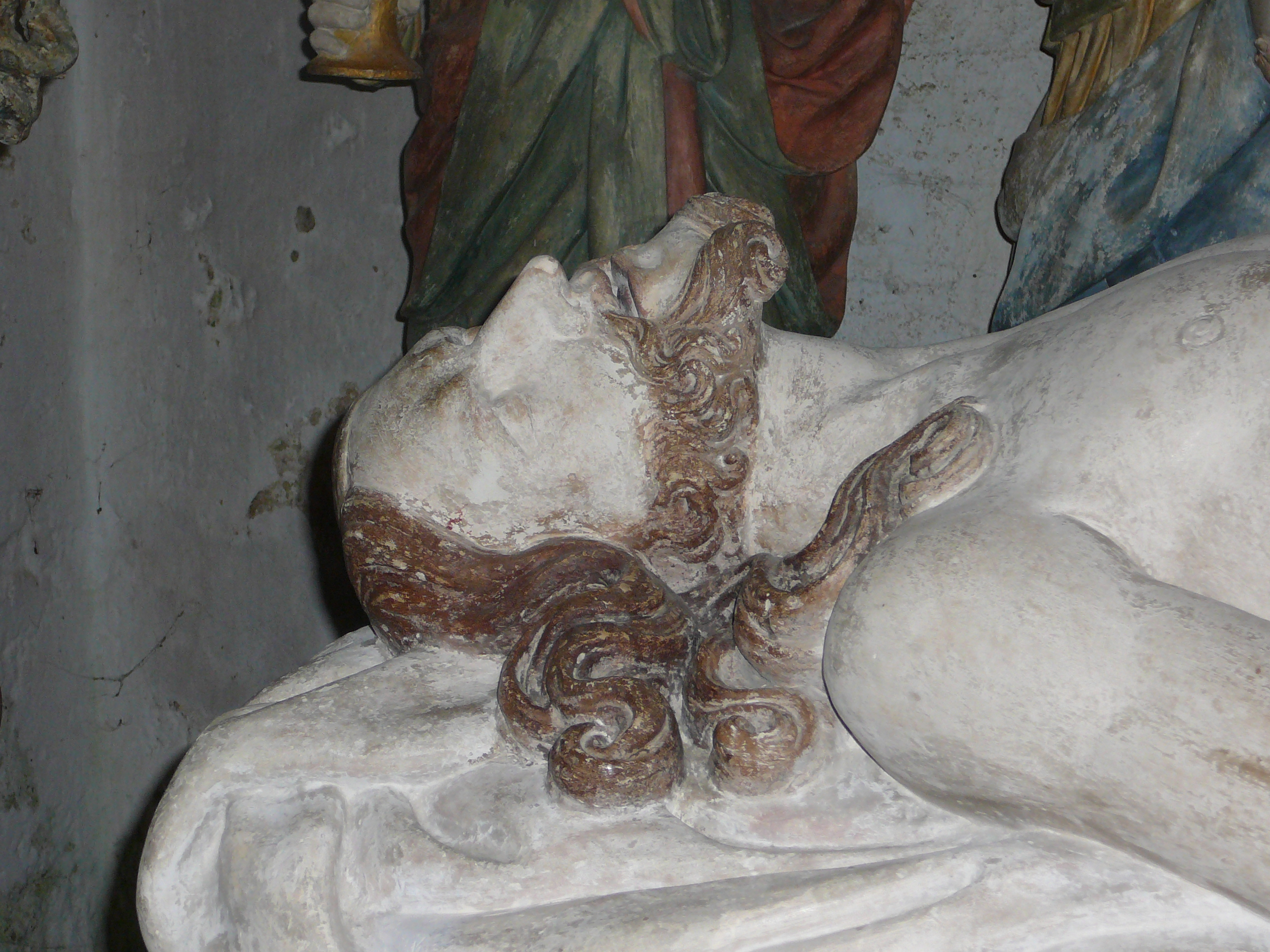
The head of Jesus in the Église Notre-Dame "mise au Tombeau"

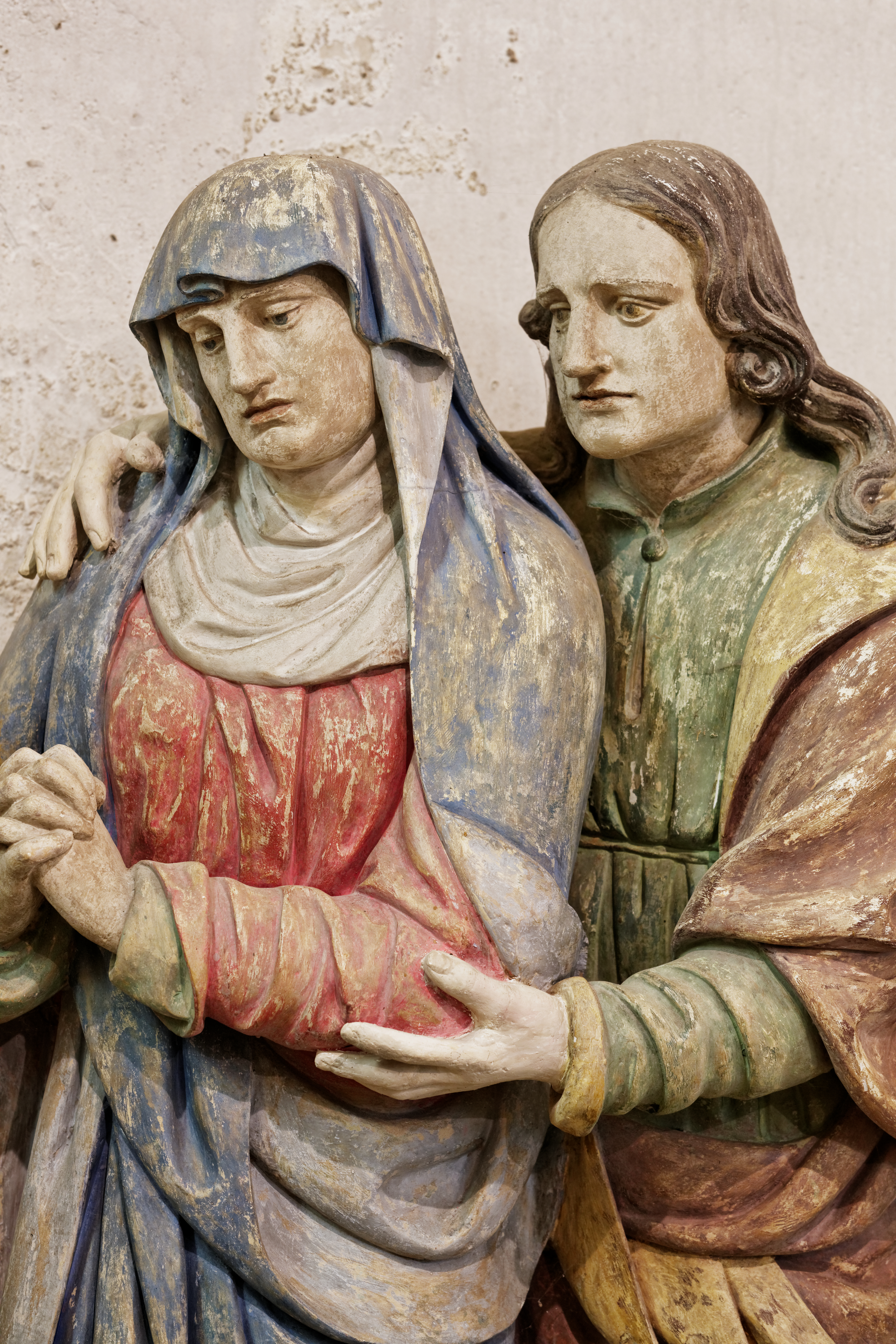
John the Evangelist comforts the Virgin Mary in the Église Notre-Dame "mise au Tombeau"

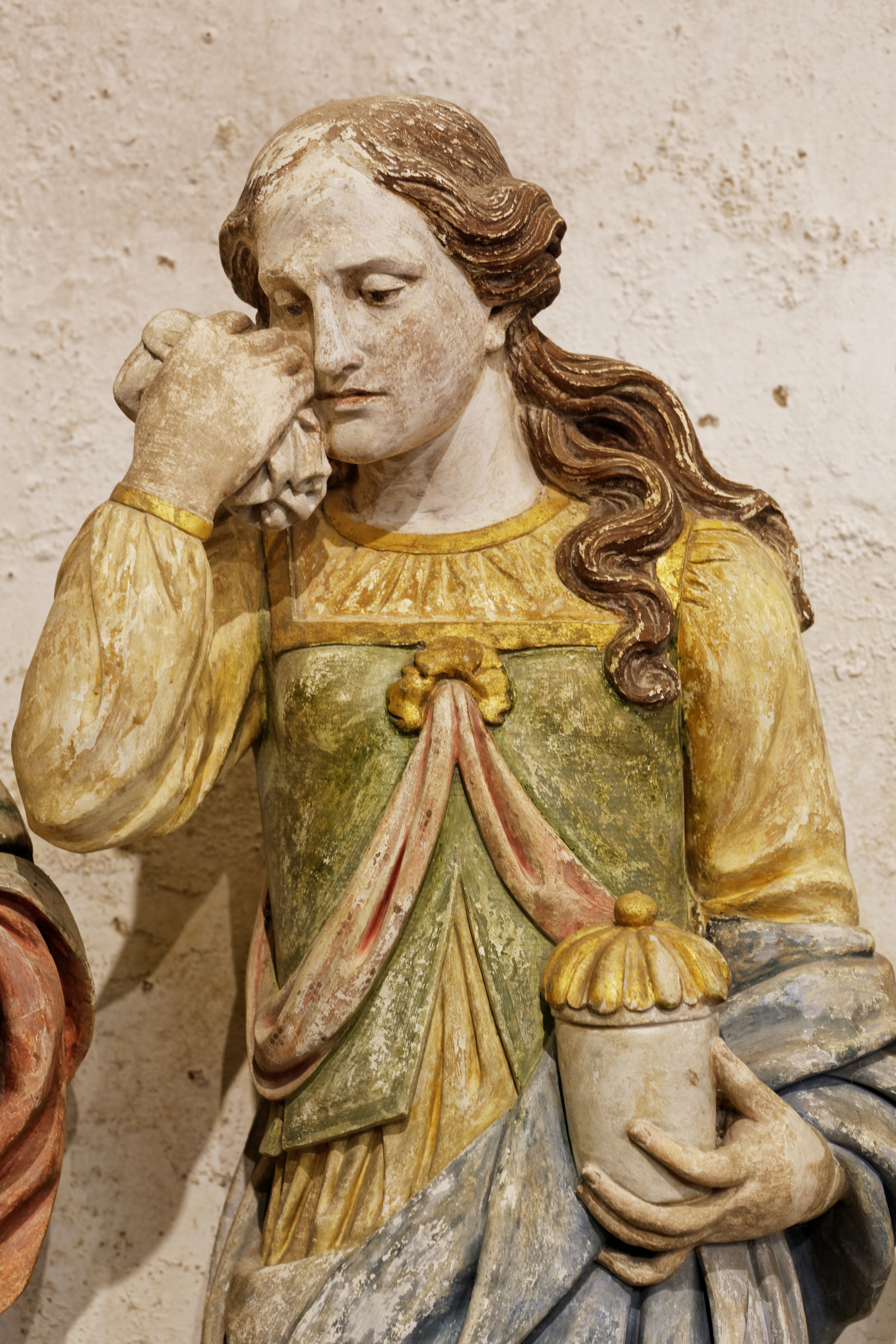
Mary Magdalene with her pot of ointment in the Église Notre-Dame "mise au Tombeau"

== Baptismal fonts ==
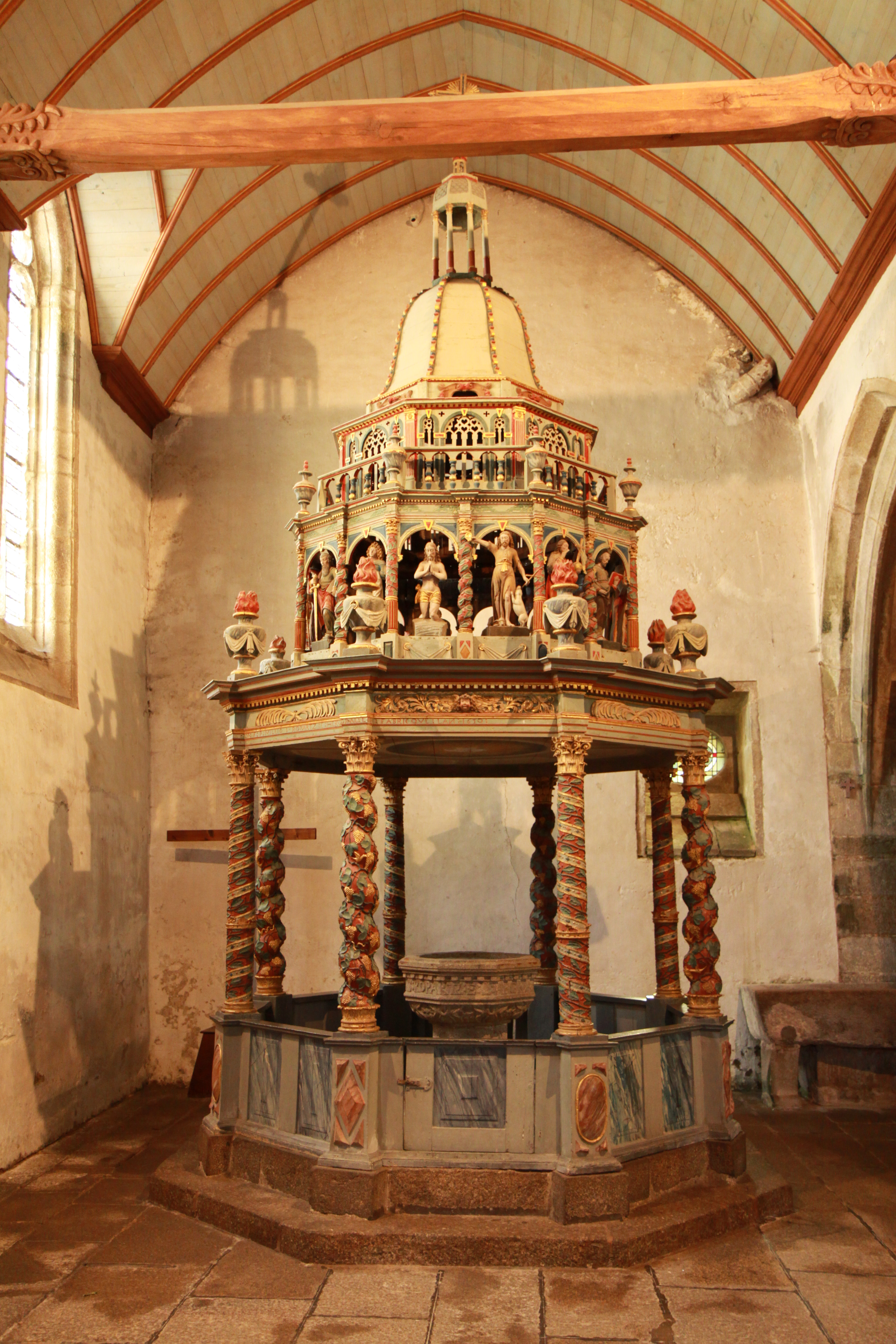
The baptismal font

These are of granite and date to 1651. The octagonal dais is the work of G. Carquain and has carvings of Christ's baptism, the angel who guarded the robe and the 12 apostles. The Baldachin involves some exquisite carving depicting Jesus' baptism by John the Baptist.

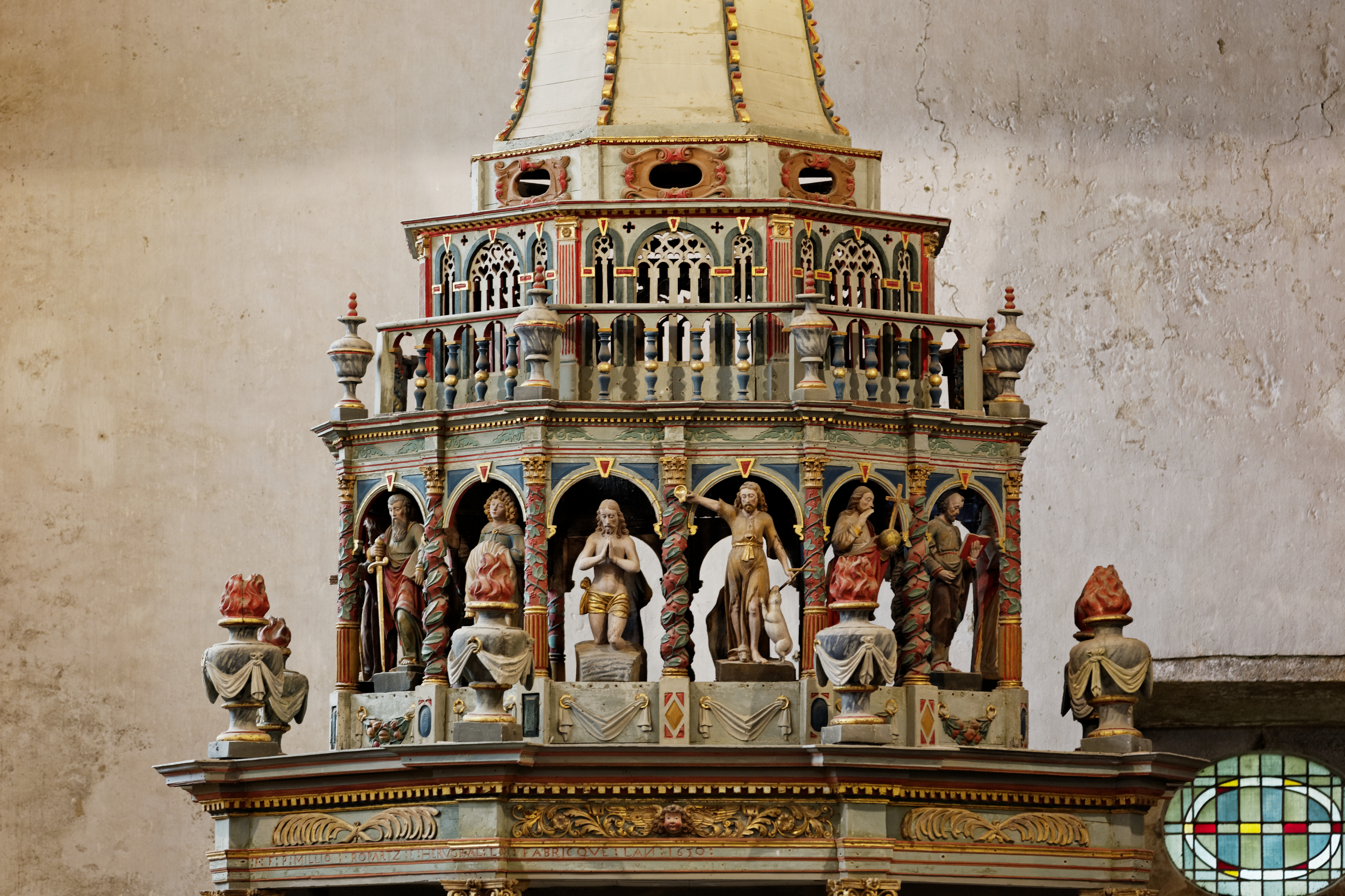
The Baldachin over the baptismal font

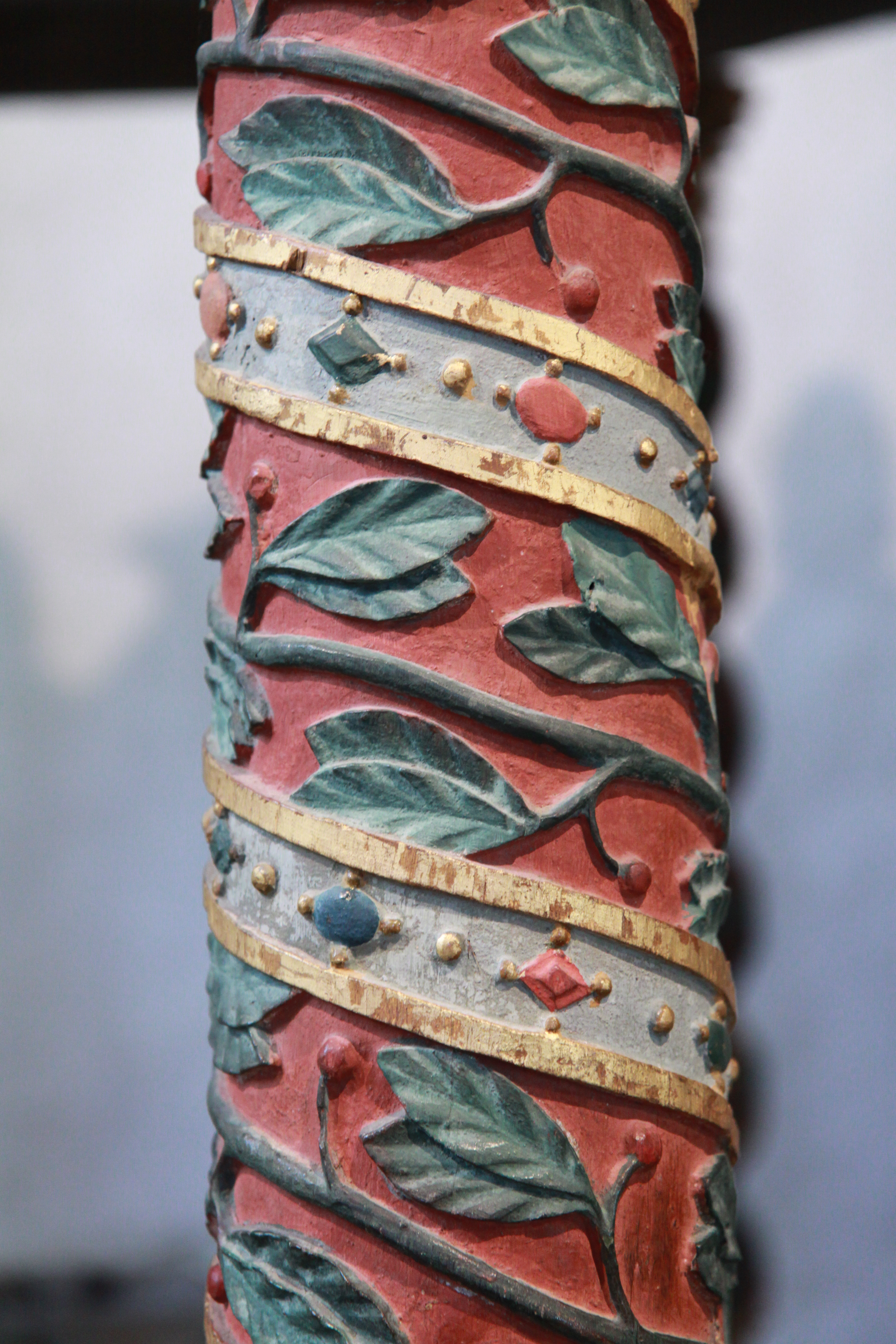
Detail of polychromed carving on Baldachin pillar

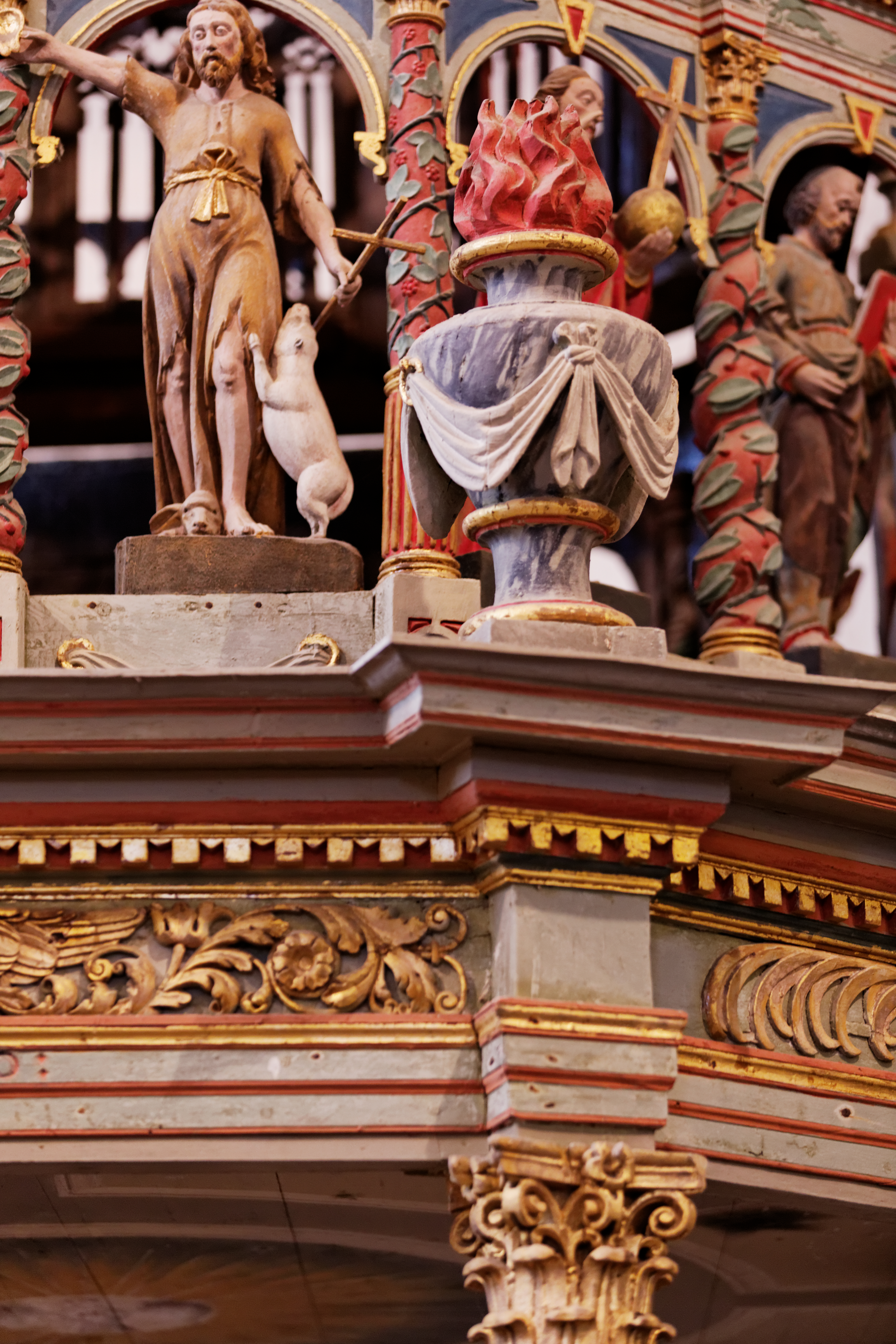
Detail on Baldachin

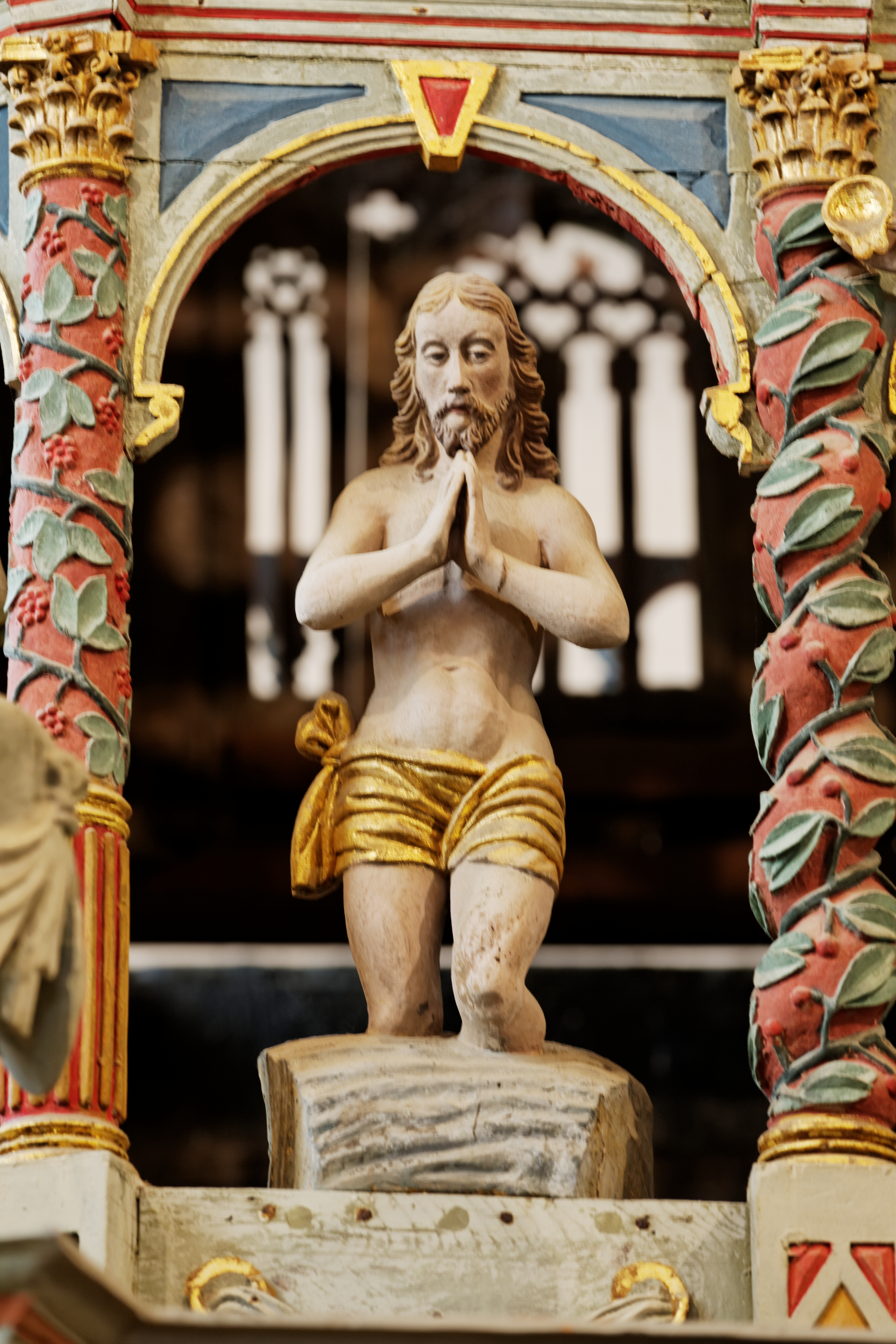
Detail on Baldachin

== See also ==
- List of the works of Bastien and Henry Prigent
